= Bettendorf =

Bettendorf may refer to:

- Bettendorf, Germany, a municipality in the district of Rhein-Lahn, Rhineland-Palatinate, Germany
- Bettendorf, Iowa, Scott County, Iowa, United States
- Bettendorf High School
- Bettendorf, Luxembourg, a commune and town in eastern Luxembourg
- Bettendorf, Haut-Rhin, a commune in the Haut-Rhin department in France
- Bettendorf (surname)
