= Robert Smallwood =

Robert Smallwood may refer to:

- Robert Smallwood (writer)
- Robert Smallwood (serial killer)
