= Regina Coeli Monastery =

- U.S. National Register of Historic Places
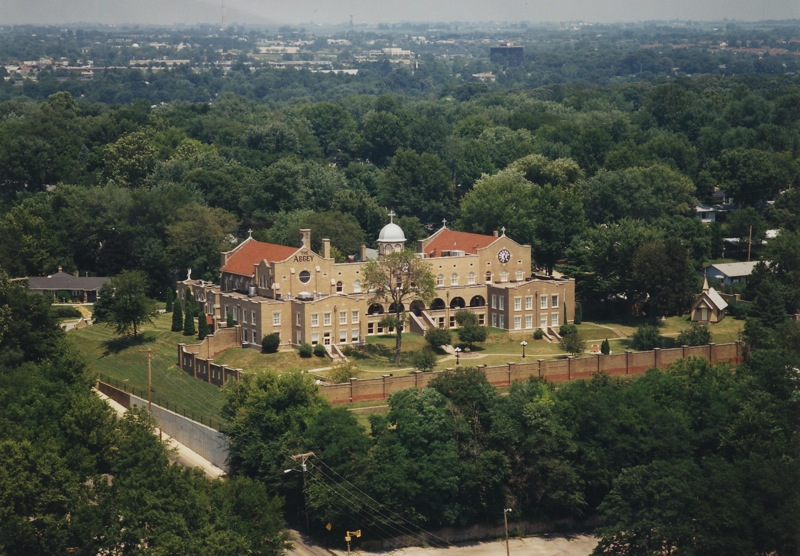

- Location within Iowa Location within the United States
- Location: 1401 Central Avenue; Bettendorf, Iowa
- Coordinates: 41°31′51″N 90°30′45″W
- Area: 2 acres (0.81 ha)
- Built: 1916
- Architect: Arthur Ebeling
- Architectural style: Mission/Spanish Revival; Late Gothic Revival; Romanesque
- NRHP reference No.: 93001590
- Added to NRHP: January 28, 1994

Regina Coeli Monastery is a historic building located in Bettendorf, Iowa, United States. It has been listed on the National Register of Historic Places since 1994. The building currently houses an addictions rehabilitation facility called The Abbey Center. The Discalced Carmelite nuns who built the building relocated to a new monastery in Eldridge, Iowa in 1975. The monastery was originally established in Davenport, Iowa by James Davis of the Catholic Diocese of Davenport.

== History ==
=== Davenport Carmel ===
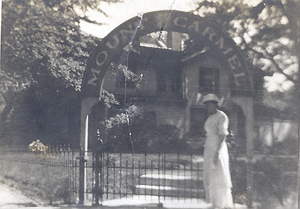
The Carmel in Davenport, Iowa

The first Discalced Carmelite nuns arrived in Davenport from the Carmel at Baltimore on November 23, 1911. The community included Mother Clare of the Blessed Sacrament, who was a native of Dubuque, Iowa and Mother Aloysius of Our Lady of Good Counsel, from Deerfield, Minnesota. Other members of the small community included Sister Gabriel of Divine Providence and Sister Gertrude of the Sacred Heart. Mother Clare's brother, Joseph Nagle, was instrumental in bringing the Carmelites to Davenport. The Archbishop of Dubuque had initially indicated that he would accept the order into his diocese, but withdrew the offer in 1905, and no other bishops in the upper Midwest were able to accept the nuns. Joseph Nagle was persistent and convinced Bishop Davis to bring the community to his diocese.

The Carmel was officially established on the feast of St. John of the Cross on November 24, 1911, with a Mass celebrated by another of Mother Clare's brothers, the Rev. Garrett Nagle, in the small cottage that was the nun's new home at 15th and Brady Streets. The Carmel was adjacent to the bishop's residence, and he would celebrate Mass for the nuns as often as possible. The Archbishop of Baltimore, James Cardinal Gibbons, appointed Mother Clare as the prioress of the new Carmel and Mother Aloysius sub-prioress before they had left Baltimore.

The cottage was a bit small and an addition was built on property donated by Bishop Davis. The addition included a chapel in the Late Gothic Revival style, nun's choir, sacristy, and six bedrooms. A covered walk was also built between the chapel and the bishop's residence. The first Mass in the new chapel was Midnight Mass on December 25, 1912. The dedication took place on February 11, 1913. The chapel was dedicated as Pater Noster Chapel, and the monastery was dedicated to the prophet Elijah.

=== Bettendorf Carmel ===
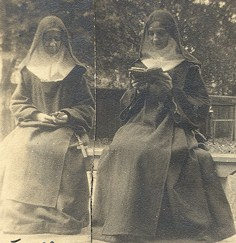
Mother Clare (left) and Mother Aloysius, who together founded the first Carmel in the Midwest.

When the new addition was completed plans were begun to expand the monastery itself so that 21 nuns could have their own room as was stipulated in the Carmelite Rule. However, the property on Brady Street was not a sufficient location to expand the building. Mother Clare indicated that Bettendorf could be a potential location. Pius Mohr located land on the bluffs above Bettendorf, and Bishop Davis purchased the land on April 3, 1915. The property was surrounded by woods and farmland, which was more appropriate for contemplative life than the city location.

Arthur Ebeling, who had designed the chapel addition, was chosen as the architect for the new Carmel. He had also designed homes and other buildings for the monastery's primary benefactors, the Walsh, Kahl, and Bettendorf families. In fact, Joseph Bettendorf's new house, also designed by Ebeling, was only a couple of blocks away on the same bluff. This was probably the largest and most complicated project that Ebeling had worked on up to this point in his career. Its then remote site did not access to improved city streets or electricity. The town provided a water hydrant for water, and a telephone was installed when priests requested it to ease the process of ordering altar breads. A professional landscaper designed the garden and grounds. The chapel was not a part of the building as yet, and the monastery itself was not fully completed when the nuns moved into their new home on June 29, 1916. The monastery's name was changed to Regina Coeli.

On Friday, November 24, 1916, the fifth anniversary of the arrival of the Carmelites in Davenport, Bishop Davis consecrated the monastery bells. The large bell was christened Vox Domini (the voice of the Lord), and the small bell, St. Joseph. The chapel of the Davenport Carmel was taken down and rebuilt at the new Carmel in Bettendorf. It was re-dedicated on Pentecost Sunday, 1919, and it kept its original name from when it was in Davenport, Pater Noster. The room that had been used for the chapel was divided in two and became the library and the chapter room. The rest of the monastery was finished in 1921, and the enclosure wall was finished in 1937.

While life in a Carmel is mostly quiet there are events that break into that silence. The Ku Klux Klan had chosen the Carmelites as the focus of their hostility toward the Catholic Church. They erected fiery crosses and created a commotion in a farmer's field opposite the monastery. Instead of driving the nuns out they provoked the townspeople who came to the nun's defense. The police restored quiet to the area and protection to the neighborhood.

Carmels are limited to 21 nuns, and when the community became too large it would establish a new Carmel. The Bettendorf Carmel established three new foundations. The Carmel at New Albany, Indiana, which later moved to Indianapolis, was established in 1922. The mission was led by Mother Teresa Seelbach and Sister Hilda Ammann. A Carmel was established in 1940 in Milwaukee, which later moved to Pewaukee, Wisconsin. It was led by Mother Paula Doersching, Mother Grace Meade, Sister Joan Meyer, Sister Elizabeth Kinsella, and Sister Ann Mezer. The Sioux City, Iowa Carmel was established in 1961, and was led by Mother Agnes Dwight, Sister Michael Skelley, Sister Magdalen Heun, Sister Raphael Baker, Sister Marie Schuman, and Sister Clare Lafferty.

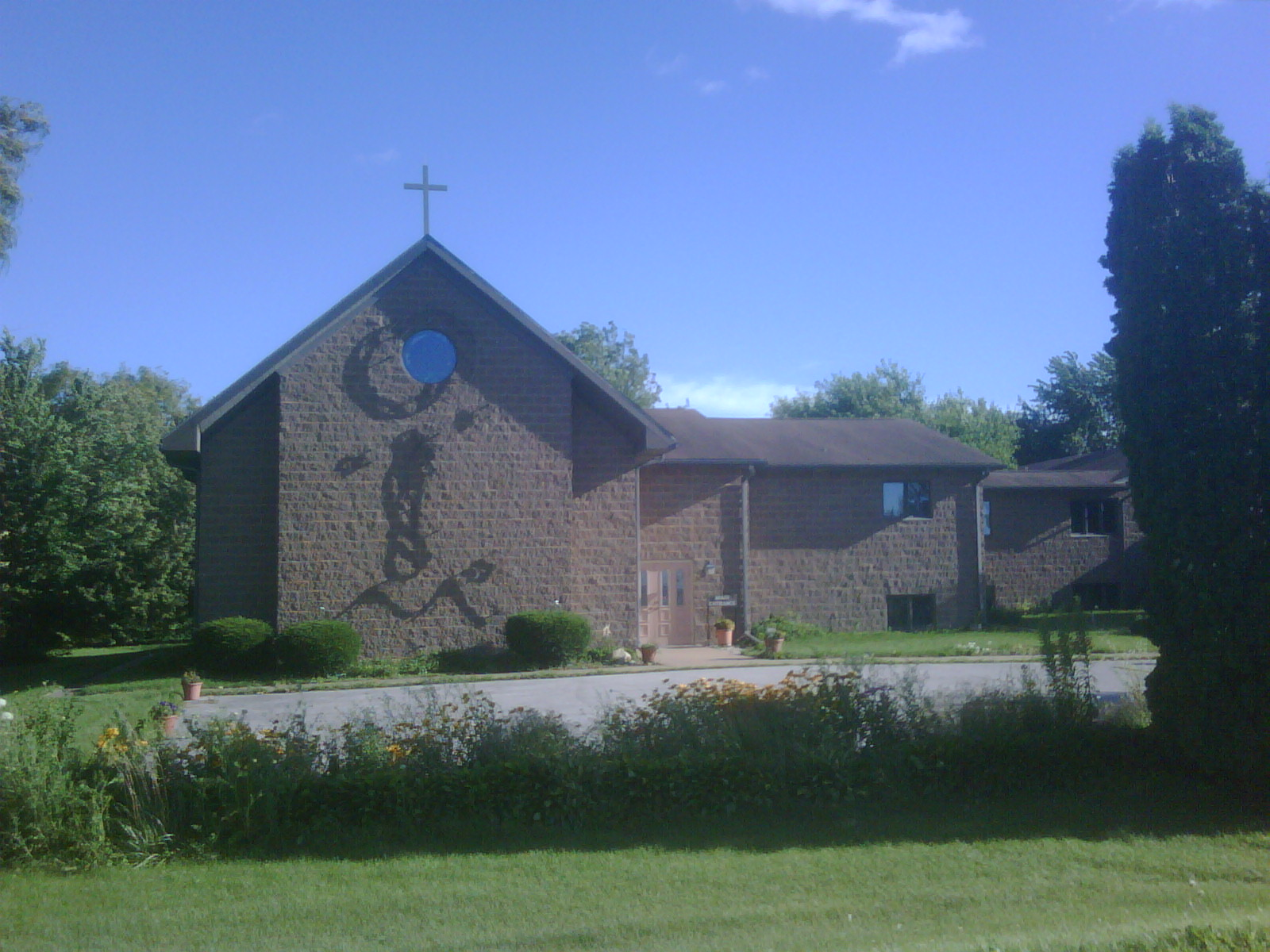
Eldridge Carmel

Social and Ecclesiastical changes ensued in the 1960s. The vacancies that were created by the establishment of the Sioux City Carmel were not filled. The nuns who remained were unable to care for the large Carmel in Bettendorf. It was decided that a more modest facility was needed and so 10 acres (40,000 m^{2}) of farmland were purchased north of Davenport near the town of Eldridge. The bodies of the deceased nuns were transferred from the crypt to Mt. Calvary Cemetery in Davenport. The Bettendorf Carmel was sold to an Evangelical Christian Church. In 1978 the Franciscan Brothers of Christ the King bought the building and renamed it St. Francis Monastery. They used it for a retreat house and hosted banquets. The brothers sold the building and the new owners remodeled it became a four-star Abbey Hotel in 1993. In 2009 the hotel was closed and it became an addictions rehabilitation center called The Abbey Center.

=== Eldridge Carmel ===
The new Carmel in Eldridge was readied for the nuns to move in on November 24, 1975, the 64th anniversary of the establishment of the Carmel in the Davenport Diocese. The large bell from the old monastery was placed in a new bell tower on the Carmel property. The new facility allowed for expansion and that has happened twice. A new chapel, named Holy Trinity, and more living and work space was added in the 1980s. In the 1990s an addition was made for more living space for the community.

Numbers in the community could not be sustained, however, and by 2015 the nuns knew they had to make a change. They began the process of looking for a new home in 2019, and determined they no longer wanted to be property owners. Through their relationship with the Sisters of St. Francis of Clinton the two communities determined that they could work out a sharing relationship with the Carmelites moving to the Franciscan motherhouse, the Canticle. On September 28, 2020, the Carmelites moved to Clinton, Iowa and put their property near Eldridge up for sale.

== Architecture ==
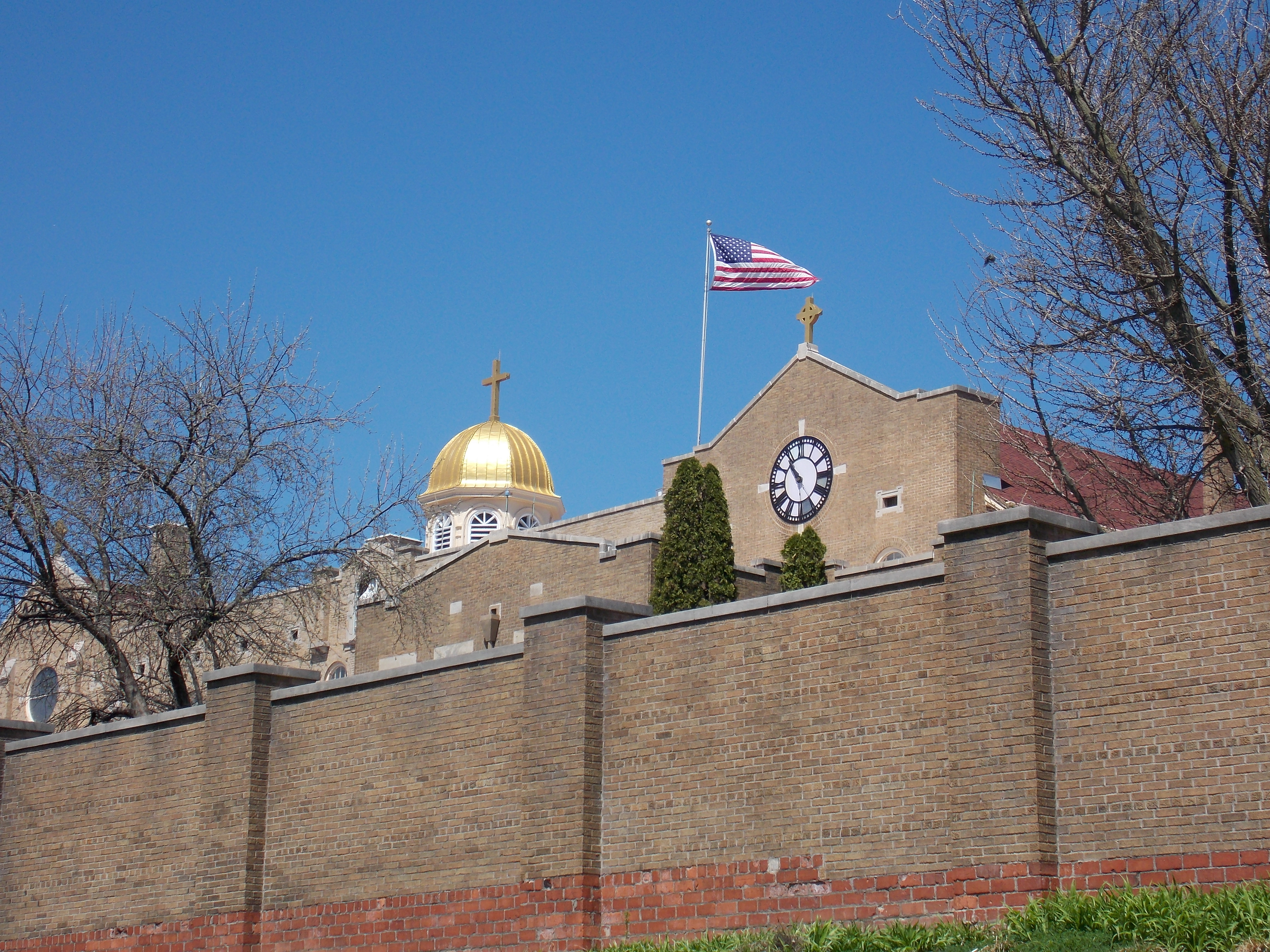
The south elevation of the building with the cloister wall in the foreground.

Arthur Ebeling used the Baltimore Carmel as his inspiration, and he used a blend of architectural styles in his design. The two-story arcade on the south elevation reflects the colonnades found in Italian Romanesque architecture. The cupola and dome are also influenced by the Romanesque, as well as Muslim designs. He utilized the Mission style in the stepped and slopping parapet. As mentioned earlier, the chapel is Gothic Revival. The architectural significance of the building is derived from Ebeling's ability to blend the various Mediterranean architectural motifs with modern and utilitarian American construction features.

The structure itself is a double cruciform building of gold mottled brick trimmed with Bedford limestone. The small dome topped with a cross is located in the middle of the center wing of the monastery. The chapel's size was used by Ebeling to determine the proportions of the building, which allowed it to be seamlessly included in the larger structure. Also, the rose window located above the altar is mirrored by the round clock face on the monastery's east wing. A 10-foot (3.0 m) cloister wall forms the southern boundary of the property. On it are the Stations of the Cross. The garden within the wall at one time had statuary and a fountain of St. Elias (non-extant).

Each of the succeeding owners of the building made numerous interior modifications that fit their need for the building. The Unity Church removed the grill work in the chapel. The Franciscans removed some walls and built others, and they added modern elements such as carpeting and a swimming pool. Some of these changes were reversed in the 1992 conversion of the building into a hotel, but most were not. During that renovation, walls were removed between some of the cells that were used by the nuns so larger hotel rooms could be created.
