= Bettendorf (surname) =

Bettendorf is a surname. Notable persons with the surname include:

- Joseph W. Bettendorf (1864–1933), American businessman, brother of William
- William P. Bettendorf (1854–1910) German-American inventor
- Jeff Bettendorf (1960 - ) Former Major League Baseball pitcher
- Victor Bettendorf (born 1990), Luxembourgish equestrian show jumper
