= AECC =

AECC may refer to:

- Aberdeen Exhibition and Conference Centre
- Aero Engine Corporation of China
- Alderley Edge Cricket Club
- Anglo-European College of Chiropractic
- American Evangelical Christian Churches
- Arkansas Electric Cooperative Corporation
- AECC University College
