= Joseph F. Bettendorf House =

Historic house in Iowa, United States

- Joseph W. Bettendorf House
- U.S. National Register of Historic Places
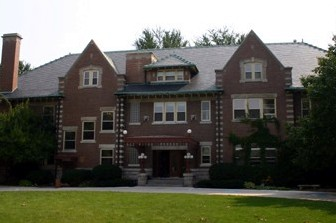

- Location within Iowa Location within the United States
- Location: 1821 Sunset Dr. Bettendorf, Iowa
- Coordinates: 41°31′44.7″N 90°30′23.5″W
- Area: 8 acres (3.2 ha)
- Built: 1914-1915
- Architect: Arthur H. Ebeling
- NRHP reference No.: 83004212
- Added to NRHP: January 27, 1983

The Joseph W. Bettendorf House is a historic building located in Bettendorf, Iowa, United States. It has been listed on the National Register of Historic Places since 1983. Built as a private home, the building now houses a private school named Rivermont Collegiate.

== History ==
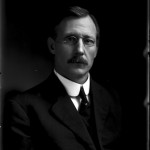
Joseph W. Bettendorf

Joseph and his brother William were industrialists in neighboring Davenport before their factory burned to the ground in 1902 and they moved their operation to the small town of Gilbert, which would rename itself Bettendorf the following year. Both men built large homes in the town of Bettendorf in the early 20th century. William, born in 1857, built his home first on a 22-acre (89,000 m^{2}) estate. It was completed for about $150,000 around the year 1910, but he died before it was finished. His wife and stepson lived in the residence until 1926 when it was sold to the Grand Lodge of Iowa, AF & AM, and became the Iowa Masonic Nursing Home.

Joseph Bettendorf, born in 1864, built this 28-room house from 1914 to 1915. It was designed by Davenport architect Arthur H. Ebeling, who referred to Bettendorf as the "fussy one." Craftsmen were brought from Europe to build the home. It is located on a high wooded bluff that overlooks the Mississippi River Valley, and the former location of the Bettendorf office and factory complex along the river. The estate was entered through a winding driveway off of Mississippi Boulevard. Its 17 acres (69,000 m^{2}) housed tennis courts, stables, a greenhouse, carriage house, servant's quarters (non-extant), and a yard to raise chickens. There were formal gardens on the north side of the property that surrounded a pond with a fountain. East of the main house was a swimming pool, which has since been filled in, and a bathhouse, which is now a private home. The Bettendorfs employed a staff of fifteen to care for the house and their needs.

The house was sold to a religious order of men in the Catholic Church called the Marists in 1959. They used the building for a seminary. In 1973 the house was sold to St. Katharine's-St. Mark's School, a college prep school operated by the Episcopal Diocese of Iowa. In 1980 the school amicably split with the church, and in 2001 it changed its name to Rivermont Collegiate. Over the years, buildings were added to the property for use by the school. The Bettendorf Home houses the upper school and offices. The house's significance is derived from its association with Joseph Bettendorf during the years he ran the Bettendorf Company alone, architect Arthur Ebeling who designed it, and school that occupies it.

== Architecture ==
The Bettendorf house is considered a well-preserved example of the English Manor Style, and it was once described as "the finest mansion ever built in the Quad-Cities." The north elevation is considered the public facade as that is where the main entrance is located, but the south elevation is more ornate. When it was built it contained marble fireplaces, marble and hardwood floors, ornate ceilings, paneling made from different woods, crystal chandeliers, and lead glass windows. There is a glass-covered marquee above the front entrance on the north side of the home. A grand staircase on the south side of the house leads through a terraced, landscaped garden, and is flanked by statues of guard dogs. The entire third floor was a ballroom. The basement held a card room, gymnasium, billiard room, and two bowling allies. The residence remained intact with its original furnishings into the 1940s. Renovations in 1966 and 1973 increased the number of bathrooms, the library was converted into a chapel, and the bowling alley and the pool were eliminated. Later, the ballroom was converted into a library. The two-story brick carriage house, which was built at the same time as the main house, remains in its original location.

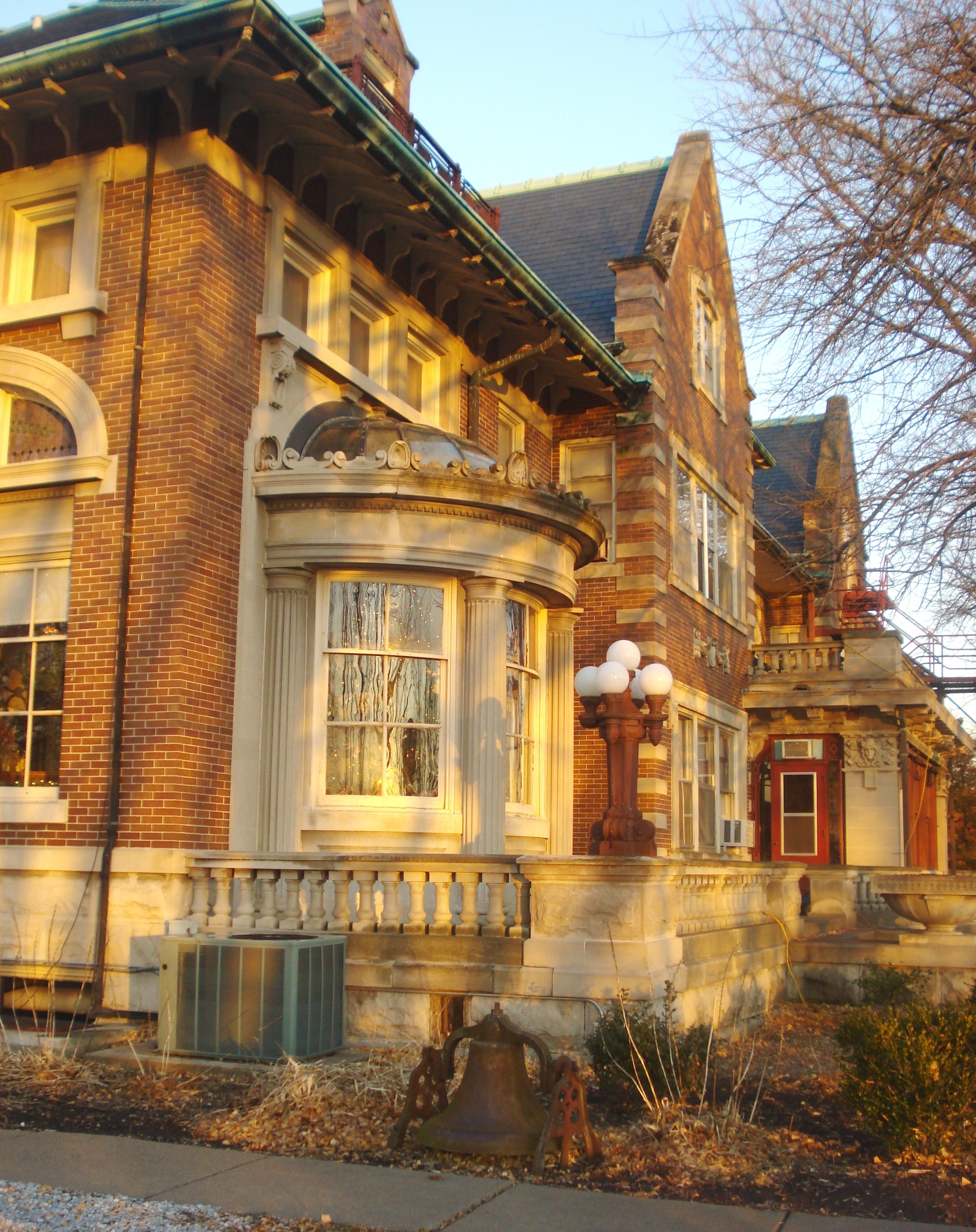
South facade detail

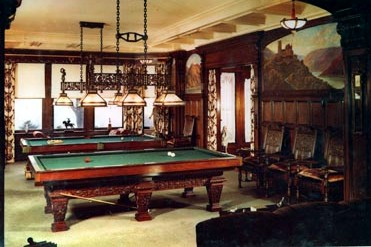
Billiard Room

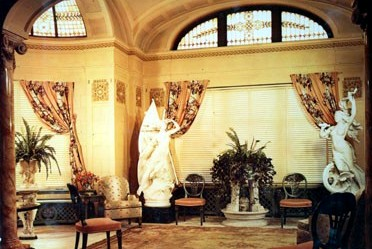
Solarium
