= Edgecombe County serial killer =

Unidentified American serial killer

- Other name: "The Seven Bridges Killer"
- Conviction: Murder x1 (Pittman)
- Penalty: Life imprisonment (Pittman)

Details
- Victims: 10–11
- Span of crimes: 2005–2009
- Country: United States
- State: North Carolina
- Date apprehended: Never apprehended

The Edgecombe County serial killer is an unidentified serial killer in the surroundings of Edgecombe and Halifax counties in North Carolina, United States. There are ten suspected victims, all African-American women, and the remains of eight have been recovered. Because some of the victims had been found near the Seven Bridges Road in Rocky Mount, the culprit has also been called The Seven Bridges Killer. All the victims were black, engaged in prostitution and had problems with drug addiction at various times.

== History ==
The first victim of the killer was a Rocky Mount woman: 29-year-old Melody Wiggins was reported missing on May 30, 2005, with her partially stripped body being found on June 2 in rural Edgecombe County. Following a forensic autopsy, it was established that the woman had received several knife wounds and blows from a blunt object to the head, which proved to be fatal.

On January 16, 2007, relatives of 43-year-old Christine Mary Boone contacted the police to report her as missing. The initial search proved unsuccessful, until her skeletonized remains were found on March 9, 2010.

On May 8, 2007, Jackie Nikelia Thorpe was reported missing. Her corpse, in a state of severe decomposition, was found on August 17 near the Seven Bridges Road. She was the first victim whose remains were found at this location.

On the afternoon of June 17, 46-year-old Joyce Renee Durham was seen for the last time in Rocky Mount. As of December 2023, she has not been located.

In February 2008, 50-year-old Ernestine Battle went missing, her skeletonized remains found on March 14 by a farmer near the Seven Bridges Road. Since the body was in a state of severe decomposition, the medical examiner was unable to establish the cause of death.

A year later, on February 5, 2009, 36-year-old Yolanda Rene Lancaster was also reported missing. In January 2011, her remains were found in a wooded area off the Seven Bridges Road by a group of hunters.

About a week later, the body of 33-year-old Elizabeth Jane Smallwood was found on a soccer field in Rocky Mount. During the investigation, it was established that she didn't maintain contact with her relatives, due to which her exact date of disappearance is unclear. Based on the state of her body, it was determined that she had been killed approximately six months before the body was found. Smallwood was the sister of serial killer Robert Smallwood.

On February 22, 28-year-old Taraha Shenice Nicholson was reported missing, with her body later found on March 7 near the Seven Bridges Road. After an autopsy, it was concluded that she had been strangled to death.

On April 25, relatives of 31-year-old Jarniece Latonya Hargrove contacted the police to report her disappearance. The initial search proved fruitless, until her remains were discovered on June 29 in a wooded area, a few yards away from the Seven Bridges Road.

On March 27, 2010, a man riding an ATV found the body of 40-year-old Roberta Williams by the side of the Seven Bridges Road. While investigating her killing, her relatives claimed that they had filed a statement to the authorities about Roberta's vanishing, which was subsequently denied by law enforcement.

== Investigation ==
While examining the murders, traces of sperm were found on Nicholson's body, which, according to the investigators, led to her killer. After a DNA examination, the biological traces were linked to Antwan Pittman, a convicted felon residing in Rocky Mount. At the beginning of September 2009, he was charged with Taraha Nicholson's murder.

=== Main suspect ===
Pittman was born on July 15, 1978, in Rocky Mount, where he was raised by his single mother. During his school years, he began to engage in criminal activities, and in 1994, he was arrested on charges of attempting to rape a two-year-old child. As part of a plea deal, he pleaded guilty to indecent behavior, and in that July was released on probation. During the probationary period, he was obliged to spend 90 days in rehabilitation institution for juvenile offenders, but was expelled after a month following a fight, after which he was placed under house arrest.

In January 1996, after committing several offences, Pittman was arrested for violating his parole, after which he was again sent to a juvenile correction center, where he remained until mid-1997. In subsequent years, he would be charged with theft, assault, resisting arrest and giving alcohol to minors. In 2003, he served 45 days in a county jail for hiding the fact that he was a registered sex offender in the state while applying for a job. During this time, a blood sample was taken from him. In 2004, he was convicted of drunk driving, for which he spent another few weeks in jail. In 2007, he was arrested for assaulting a prostitute, in the same area where the other victims had been killed.

In the spring of 2009, Pittman was arrested once again for driving under the influence, but was released after his bail was paid. After failing to appear in court for his trial, he was listed as a fugitive and thereafter arrested in Nash County in August. He was lodged in the county jail yet again, where he would soon be charged with Nicholson's murder. Due to circumstantial evidence, investigators began to suspect that Pittman might be responsible for the other killings. It turned out that he often visited the area near Seven Bridges Road since, as a teenager, he had lived for several years at his grandparents' home in Whitakers, which was located only a few miles away from where Nicholson, Williams, Thorpe, Battle and Hargrove's bodies were later found. Prior to his arrest, he had lived in Rocky Mount for six years, including in a one-story brick building on the outskirts of town, which was not far from Seven Bridges Road. In 2005, he briefly lived in a house located near the soccer field where Smallwood's body would later be found.

In 2006, Pittman lived for several weeks in a trailer in Scotland Neck, where in March 2010, Christine Boone's corpse would be found in a wooded area not far from the trailer. In addition, Antwan was detained by traffic police at Seven Bridges Road on the same day that another victim, Hargrove, mysteriously disappeared. He was found unconscious in his car with his pants lowered, after which he was awakened and interrogated, and later charged with drunk driving. Two months later, Hargrove's body was found in a field 180 yards away.

At his trial, Pittman was forced to admit that he knew Taraha. According to him, six days before her body was discovered, he put her in his car and paid for her sexual services. After they had sex, he dropped the girl off near the library in downtown Rocky Mount, and never saw her again. In September 2011, Pittman was found guilty of Taraha Nicholson's murder and sentenced to life imprisonment without parole.

Despite the fact that he was never charged with the other murders, the media and police have identified him as responsible for them, since, according to the official version provided by law enforcement, the killings ceased after his arrest.

== Public awareness ==
In July 2012, a charity motorcycle ride was held for the five women found murdered. The ride was organized to help raise awareness for the nine women found dead who are suspected to be victims of the Edgecombe killer.

== See also ==
- List of fugitives from justice who disappeared
- List of serial killers in the United States
- List of serial killers by number of victims
