= Joseph W. Bettendorf =

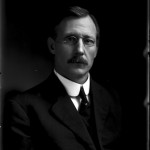
- Born: October 10, 1864; Leavenworth, Kansas, US
- Died: May 1933 (aged 68); Bettendorf, Iowa, US
- Resting place: Oakdale Memorial Gardens; Davenport, Iowa; 41.546°N 90.55°W
- Occupation: Co-owner of Bettendorf Axle Company
- Known for: Industrialist
- Spouse: Elizabeth Ohl
- Children: 2

Joseph W. Bettendorf (October 10, 1864 – May, 1933) was an American businessman with his brother William P. Bettendorf in Davenport and Bettendorf, Iowa. The city of Bettendorf is named after the two brothers.

== Biography ==
=== Early life and career ===
Joseph Bettendorf was born in Leavenworth, Kansas, the third child and second son of Michael Bettendorf and Catherine (Reck) Bettendorf. His father was born Michael Betteldorf in Nohn in the German Eifel region and changed his surname upon arrival in the United States. Joseph was nine years old when the family settled in Peru, Illinois, where he received most of his education. His first job was as a machinist and he worked his way up to foreman in the assembly department.

J.W. Bettendorf moved to Davenport, Iowa in 1886 to join his brother William where they organized Bettendorf Metal Wheel Company. He worked as a machinist before becoming a supervisor in the plant. In 1890 he moved to Springfield, Ohio where he managed a branch of the business. He returned to Davenport three years later where the brothers began manufacturing steel gear wagons.

=== The Bettendorf Company ===
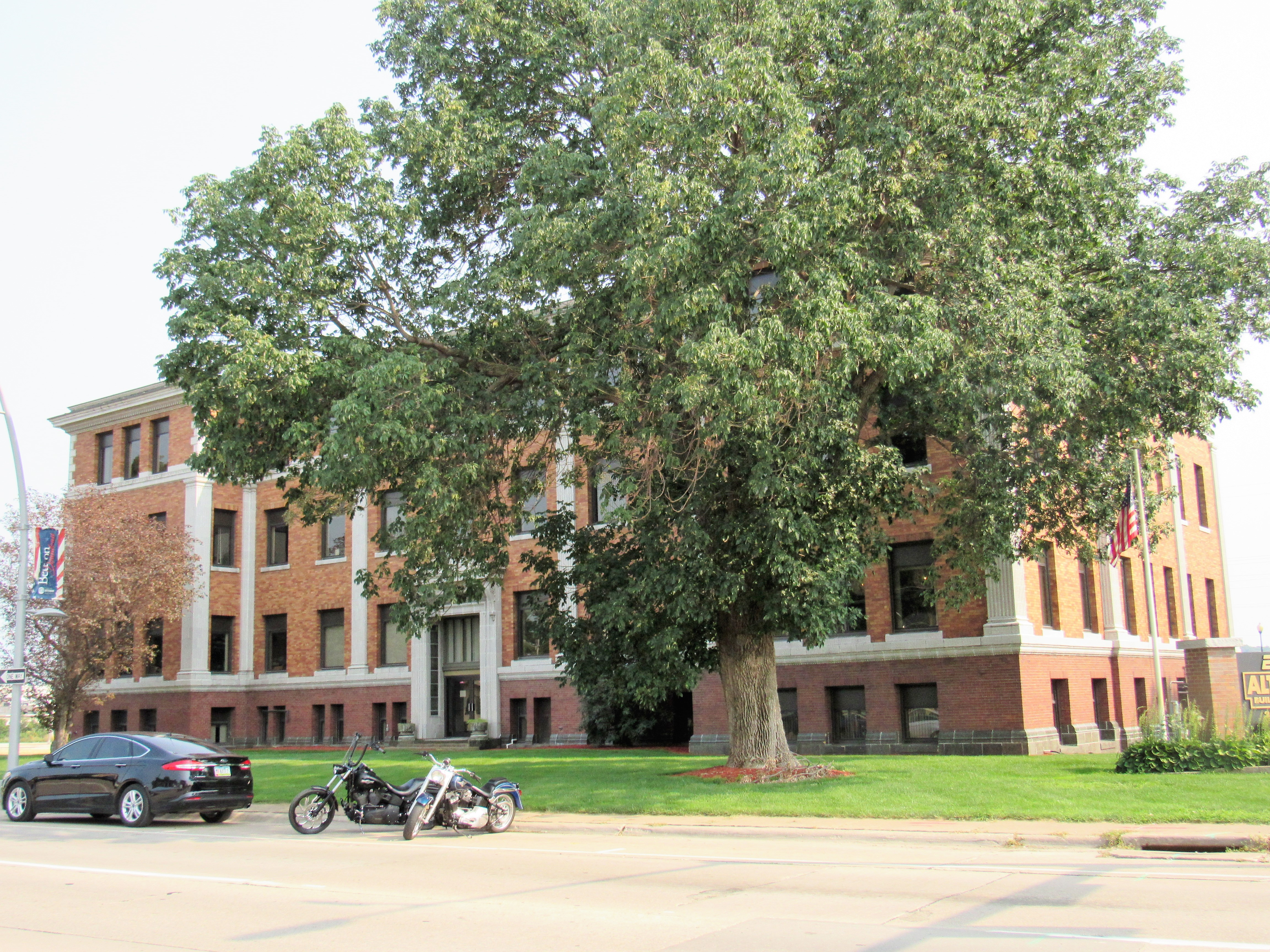
The Bettendorf Co. headquarters

In January 1895 the brothers incorporated their new venture under the name of the Bettendorf Axel Company. W. P. Bettendorf was the company's first president and J.W. Bettendorf initially served as secretary and manager of the company. Two fires in 1902, one on January 28 and the other in May, destroyed the plant. The residents of the town of Gilbert, which was about three miles east of Davenport at the time, raised $15,000 to buy the old Gilbert farm between the Mississippi River and the Davenport, Rock Island and North Western Railway tracks. The brothers decided to establish a new plant in Gilbert. A year later the citizens of the town elected to change its name to Bettendorf. In 1906 J.W. became treasurer of the company.

The factory was built on a 70-acre (0.28 km^{2}) plot of land. The company originally was a manufacturer of agricultural implements. Its rapid growth was spurred by William Bettendorf's design of a one-piece railroad truck frame that eliminated bolts, which would work loose as the train was moving and cause delays or derailments. The new frame was cast from a single piece of steel and revolutionized the railroad industry. By 1909 the plant had grown to three times its original size. It contained two regenerative open-hearth basic steel furnaces, with a capacity of 25 tons per heat. They were able to output about one hundred tons of finished steel castings daily that were used in the construction of the railroad boxcars. A complete railroad car was built from raw materials in the east end of the plant to the finished product on the west end. The company expanded in the early 20th century and its divisions made 29 different machines or tools. They acquired the Dooler Oil Company, which was later renamed the Bettendorf Oil Burner, Buddy L toys, Slice-Master bread and cake slicers and Chippewa Pumps, which made water pumps. They also had divisions that produced hand dollys to move rail cars, ice crushers, table-top cigar lighters, and a machine to compress and bundle wastepaper. The company also built the Meteor automobile between 1907 and 1912. Corporate holding companies named Micro and Westco were established to hold these acquisitions. They were later merged and named Micro-Westco. Between 1903 and 1910 the workforce grew from 300 to 800 employees.

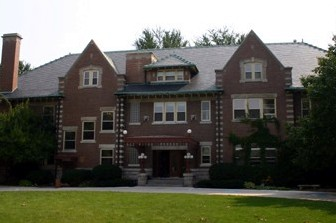
The Bettendorf House, now Rivermont Collegiate.

William Bettendorf died on June 3, 1910, and J.W. took over the leadership of the company. While William invented many of the products that the company manufactured, J.W. was known for his business sense that allowed the company to expand and grow financially. Workers worked six ten-hour days a week with an hour off for lunch. Piece workers and day laborers were paid $40 to $50 a week. While the company grew it was also known to have a "family atmosphere" about it. Parties, picnics and sporting competitions were held on a regular basis. A magazine called the Car Journal was published for employees and their families monthly. Employees who worked for the company ten years or more were enrolled in the Loyalty Club.

As World War I took hold the company experienced labor shortages. Armenian and Greek immigrants had provided most of the labor force. Company recruiters were sent to Ciudad Juárez, Mexico, to find workers. A village was constructed to house the 150 Mexican workers that came to Bettendorf and was called "Holy City." Its name was derived from the multiple number of workers whose name was recorded as "Jesus," whether that was his name or not. Many also gave their name as "George Washington" and the most common birth date was July 4. The company had built a series of one-room cottages to house the laborers. There were also two-story frame apartment buildings for the unmarried workers and some of the larger box cars were also used for housing. Holy City was demolished in the 1940s and is now the sight of storage tanks owned by oil companies.

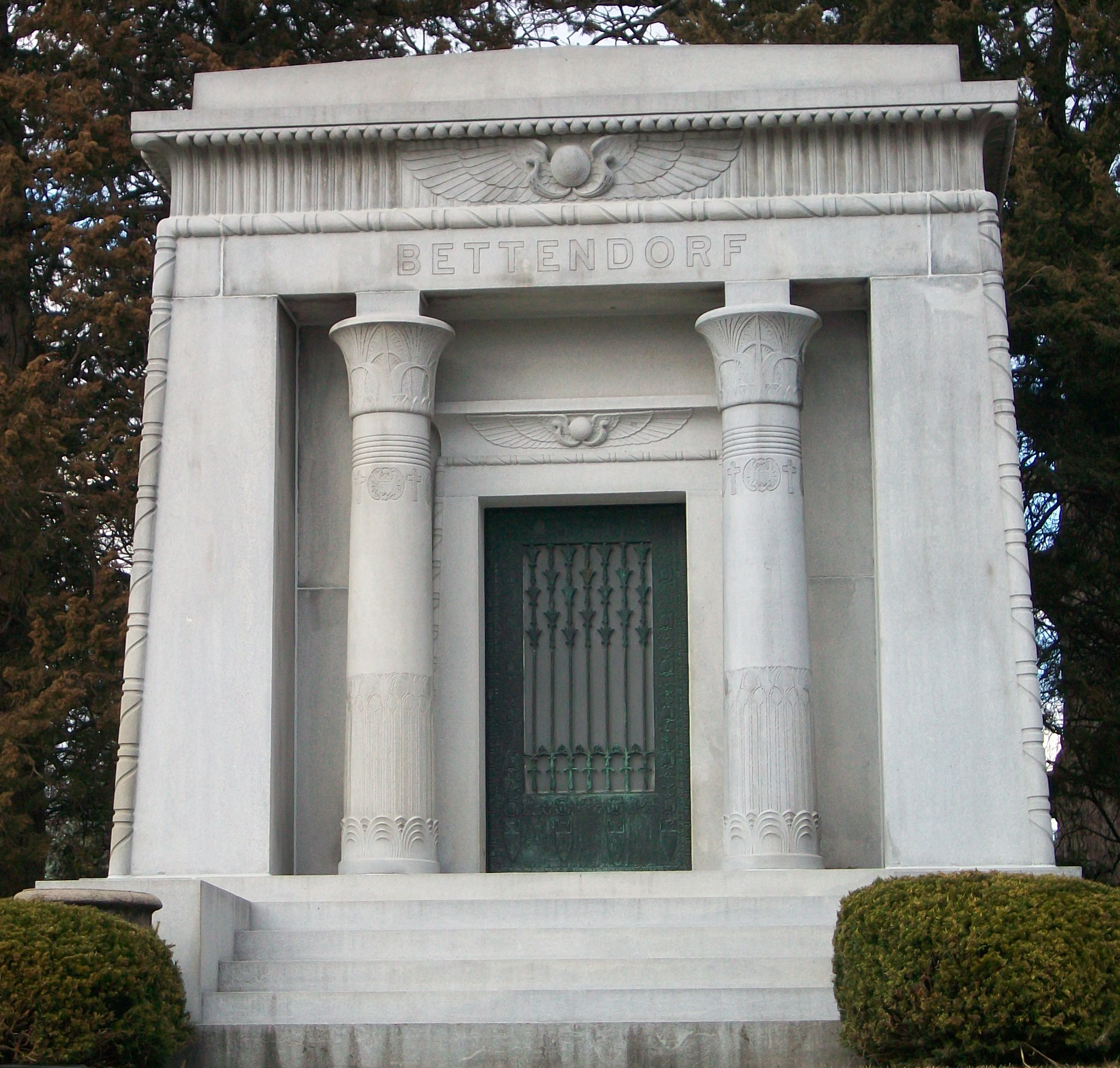
Grave in Oakdale Cemetery

By 1920 the Bettendorf plant was the largest railroad car manufacturing plant west of the Mississippi River and employed 3,000 people. The company was affected by the Great Depression. The plant was closed in 1932, the year before J.W. Bettendorf died. At the start of World War II the plant was used by the United States Navy to produce protective devices for ships. The truck plant was bought by the United States Army in 1942 to produce tanks. In 1946 the plant was sold to J.I. Case. Today it is the site of the Isle of Capri Casino.

=== Personal life ===
J.W. Bettendorf married Elizabeth Ohl in 1888. She was the daughter of George and Sibilla Ohl. They raised two sons, Edwin J. and William E. He built an estate on 17 acres (69,000 m^{2}) situated on a bluff overlooking the city of Bettendorf and the river valley below. It has been listed on the National Register of Historic Places. The property is now the campus of a private school, Rivermont Collegiate. Bettendorf died in May 1933 and was buried in Oakdale Cemetery in Davenport.
