= List of railroad truck parts =

Parts list of railroad trucks (bogies)

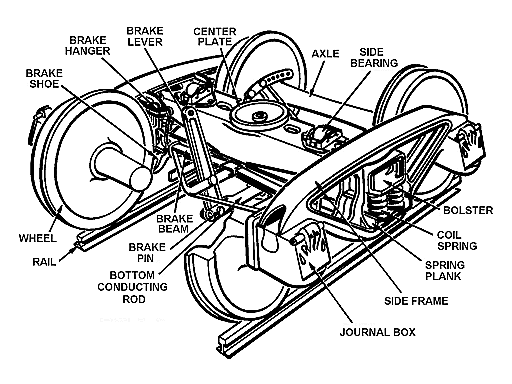
A Bettendorf-style truck (bogie) with the names of its parts. The journal boxes are integral parts of the side frame. Most types of modern freight trucks originate in this design.

A bogie or railroad truck holds the wheel sets of a rail vehicle.

== Axlebox ==
An axlebox, also known as a journal box in North America, is the mechanical subassembly on each end of the axles under a railway wagon, coach or locomotive; it contains bearings and thus transfers the wagon, coach or locomotive weight to the wheels and rails; the bearing design is typically oil-bathed plain bearings on older rolling stock, or roller bearings on newer rolling stock.

Plain bearings are now illegal for interchange service in North America. As early as 1908 axle boxes contained a set of long cylindrical rollers allowing the axle to rotate. It was also used on steam locomotives such as the Victorian Railways A2 class, the LMS Garratt, the LSWR 415 class, and the GCR Class 1.

== Center pin ==
A large steel pin—or rod—which passes through the center plates on the body bolster and truck bolster. The truck turns about the pin, and stress is taken by the center plates.

== Center plate ==
One of a pair of plates which fit one into the other and support the car body on the trucks allowing them to turn freely under the car. The one on the truck may also be called center bowl.

== Truck side frame ==
The frame at either side of the truck.

== Truck bolster ==
Each truck has a bolster—a transverse floating beam—between the side frames. It is the central part of every truck on which the underframe of the railcar or railroad car is pivoted through the center pivot pin.

== Side bearing ==
There is one side bearing located on each side of the centerplate on the truck bolster. In case of a shared bogie on an articulated car, there are two on each side.

== Brake rigging ==
The brake rigging includes the brake lever, the brake hanger, the brake pin, the brake beam and the brake shoes.

== Image gallery ==
Journal boxes and axle boxes

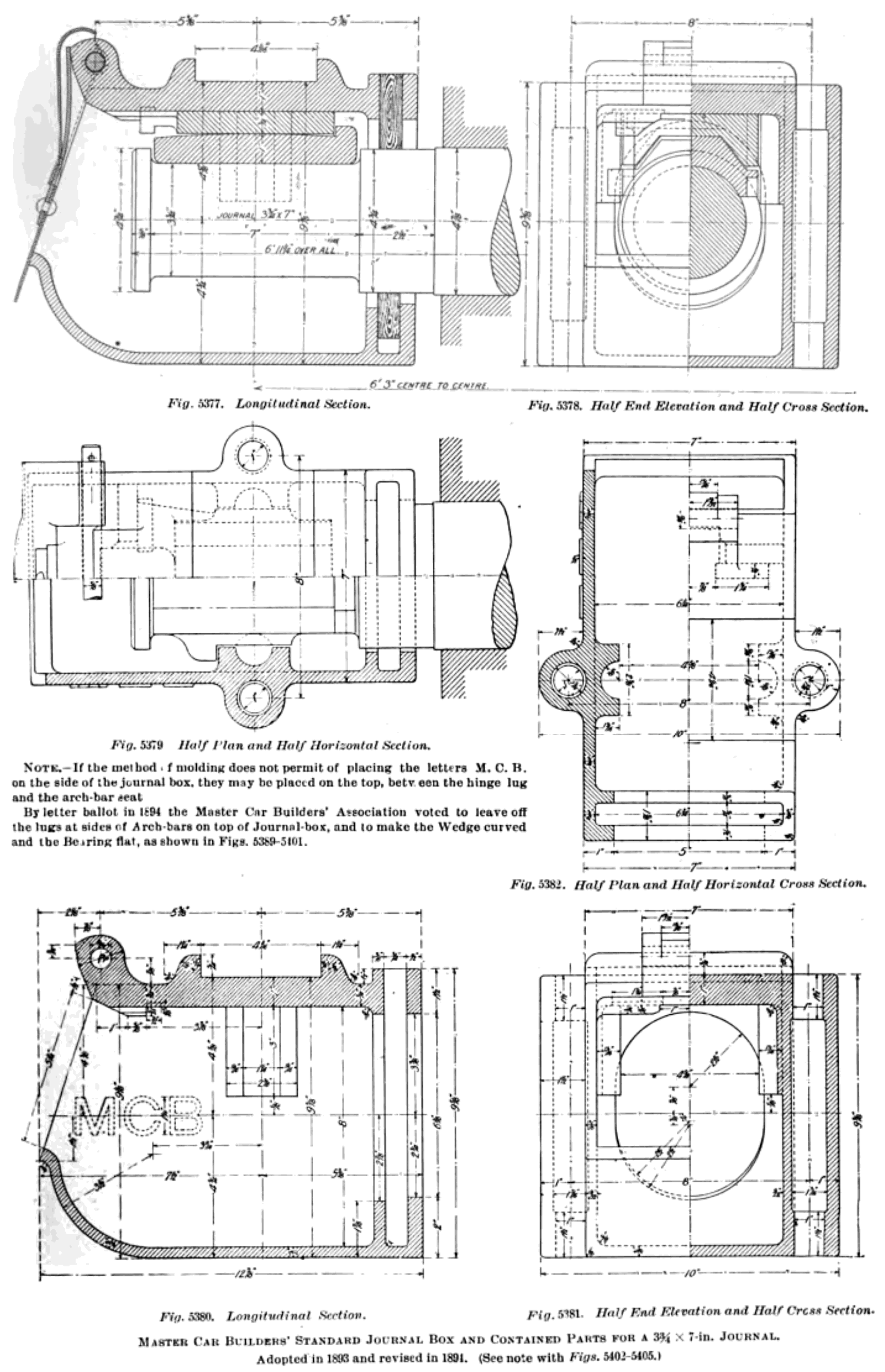
An American journal box showing a plain bearing

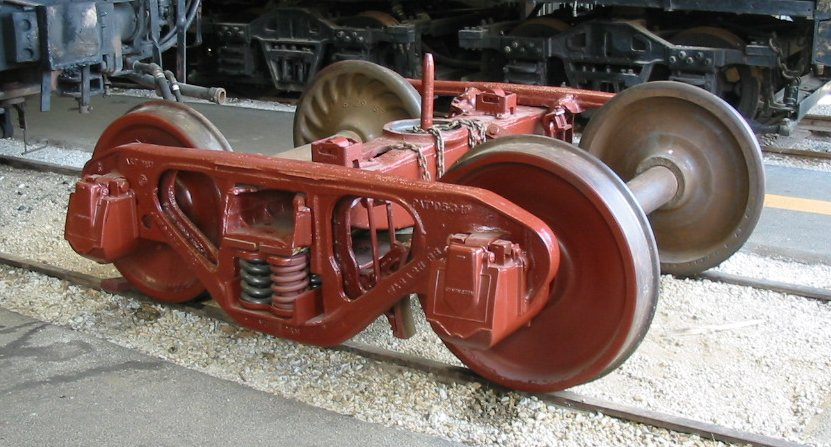
This Bettendorf-style freight car truck uses journal bearings in journal boxes that are integral parts of the side frames. The center pin can be seen pointing up from the bolster. It has coil springs.

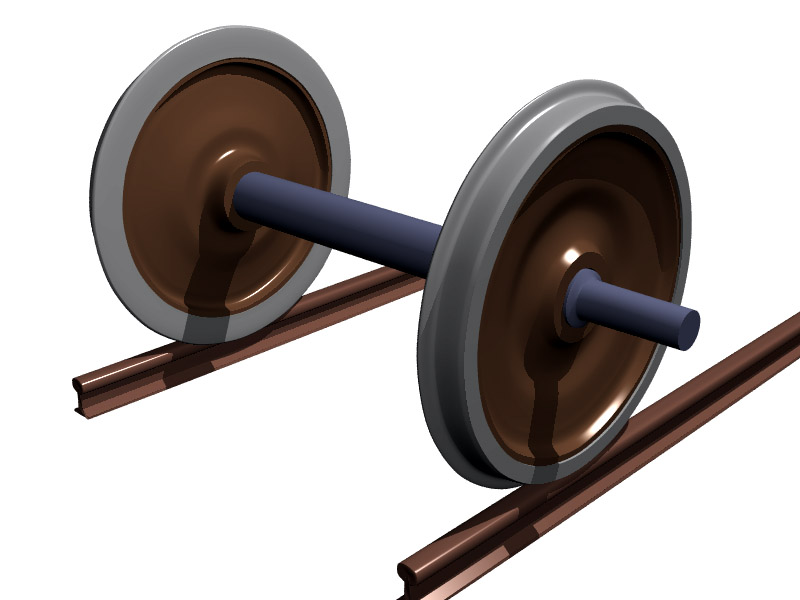
Railroad car wheels are joined to a straight axle, allowing both wheels to rotate together. This is called a wheelset.

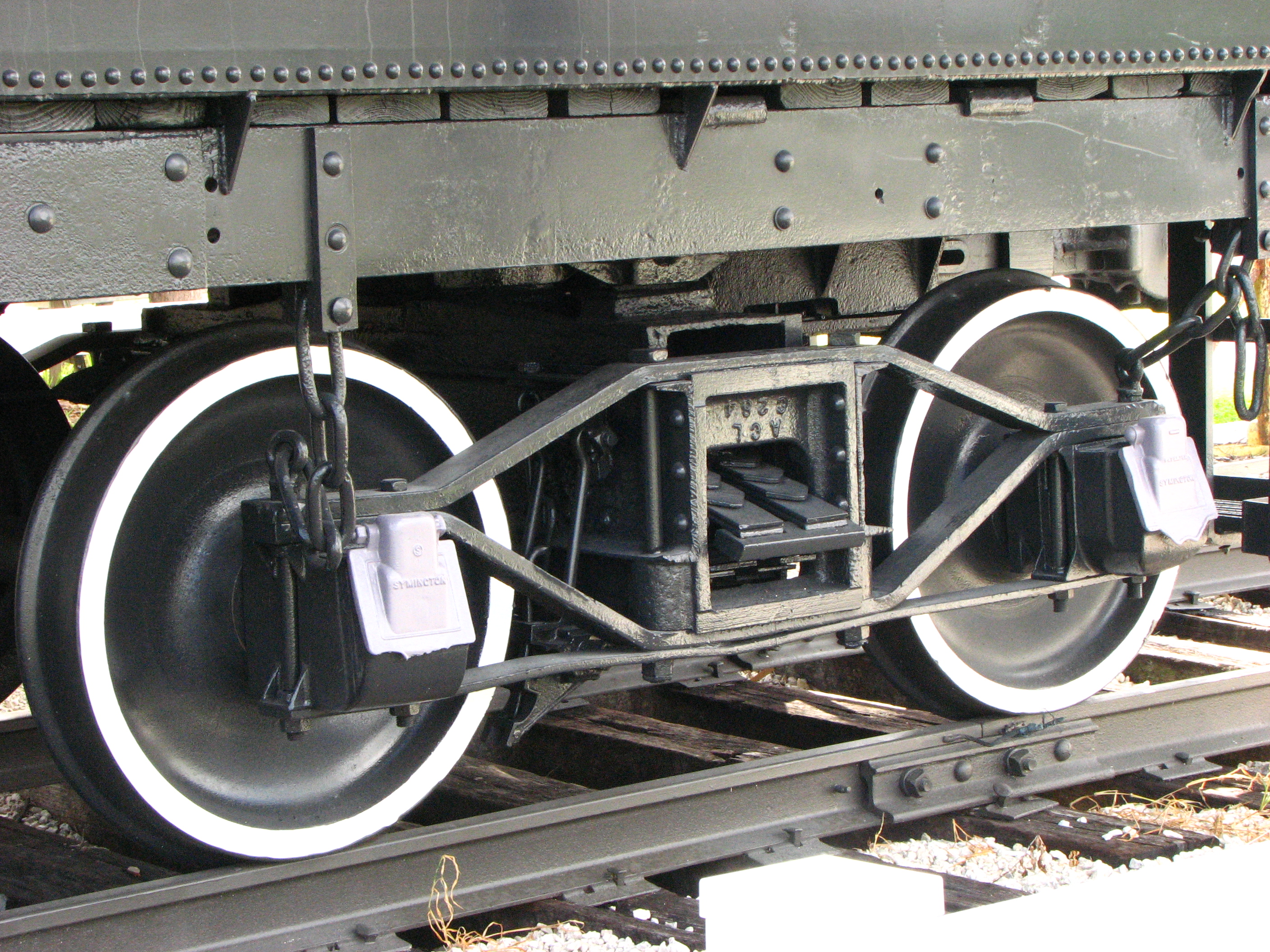
An archbar-type truck with American style journal boxes that are bolted to ends of the side frame

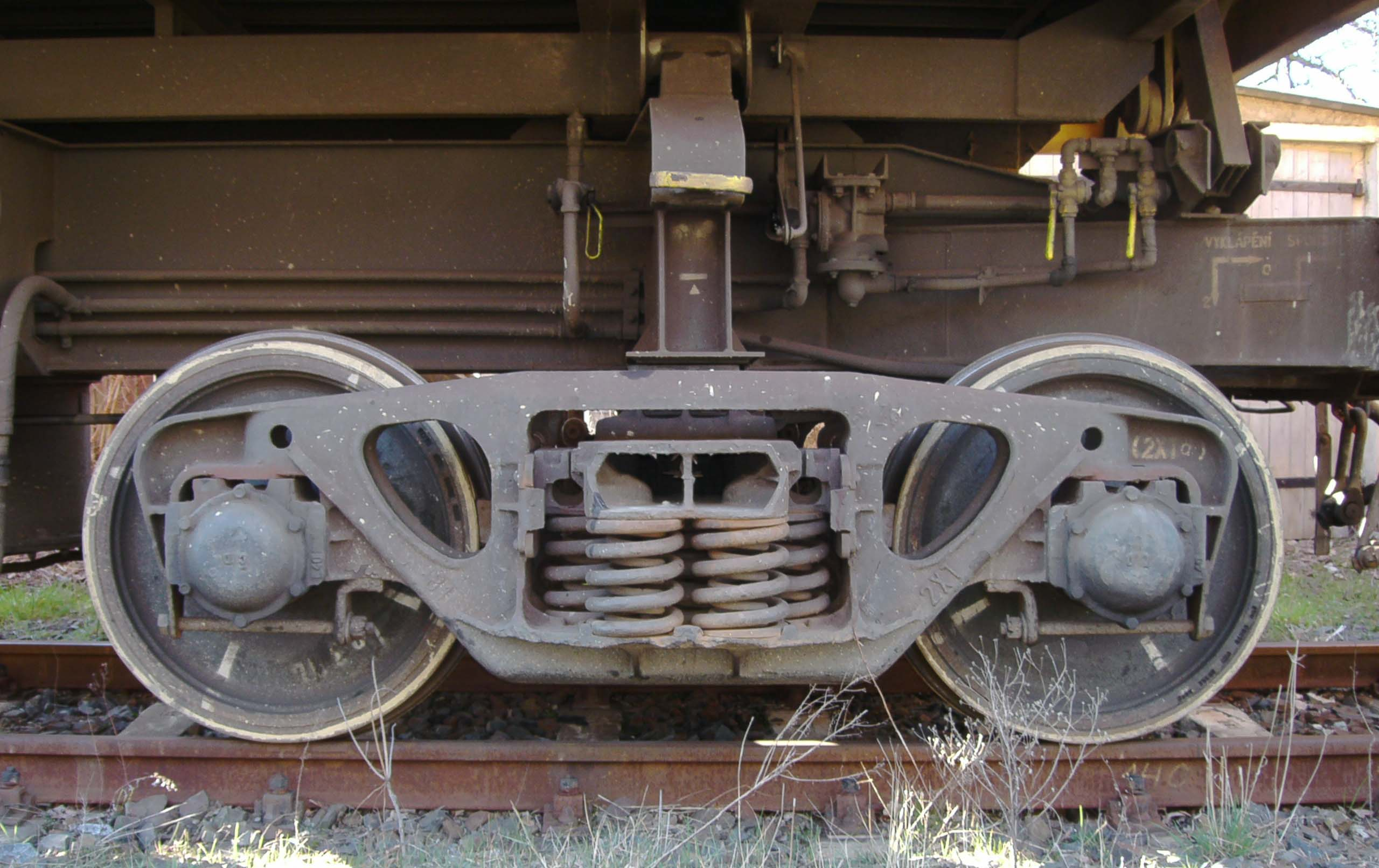
A Bettendorf-style truck with axle boxes, which are not part of the side frames, at the wheels

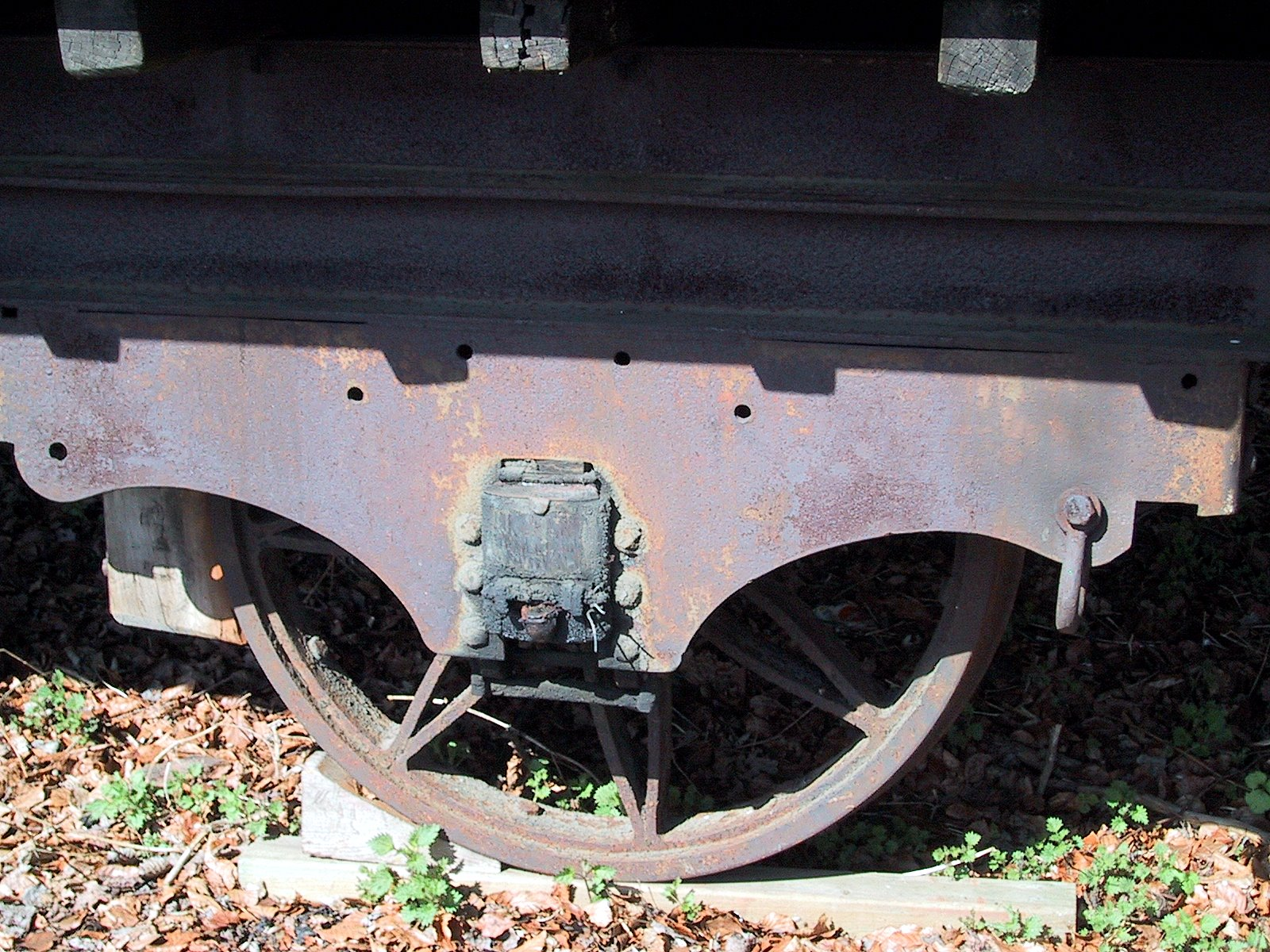
A Swiss axlebox

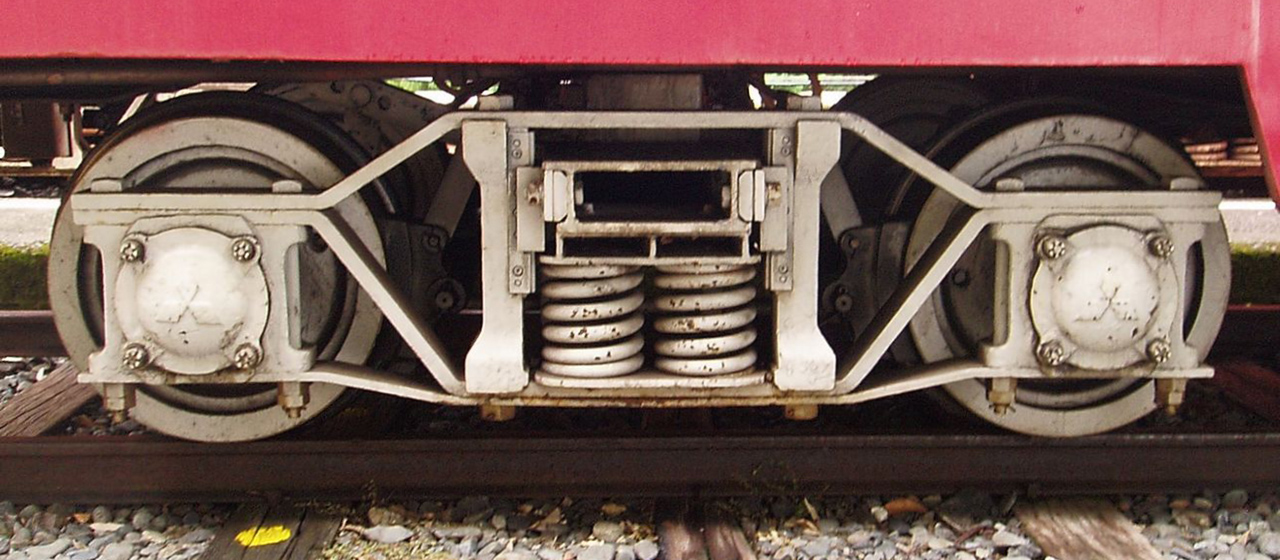
Japanese archbar truck with axleboxes at the wheels

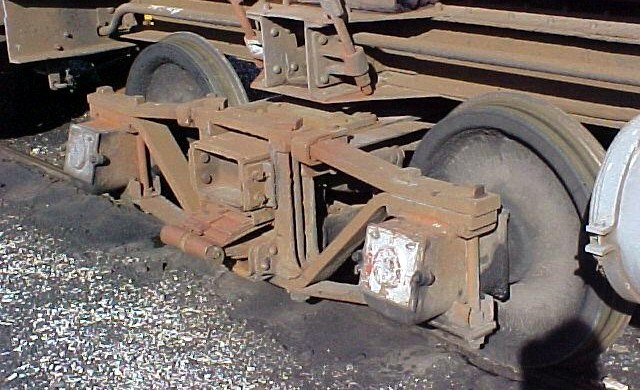
Diamond frame bogie, elliptical springs and American style journal boxes

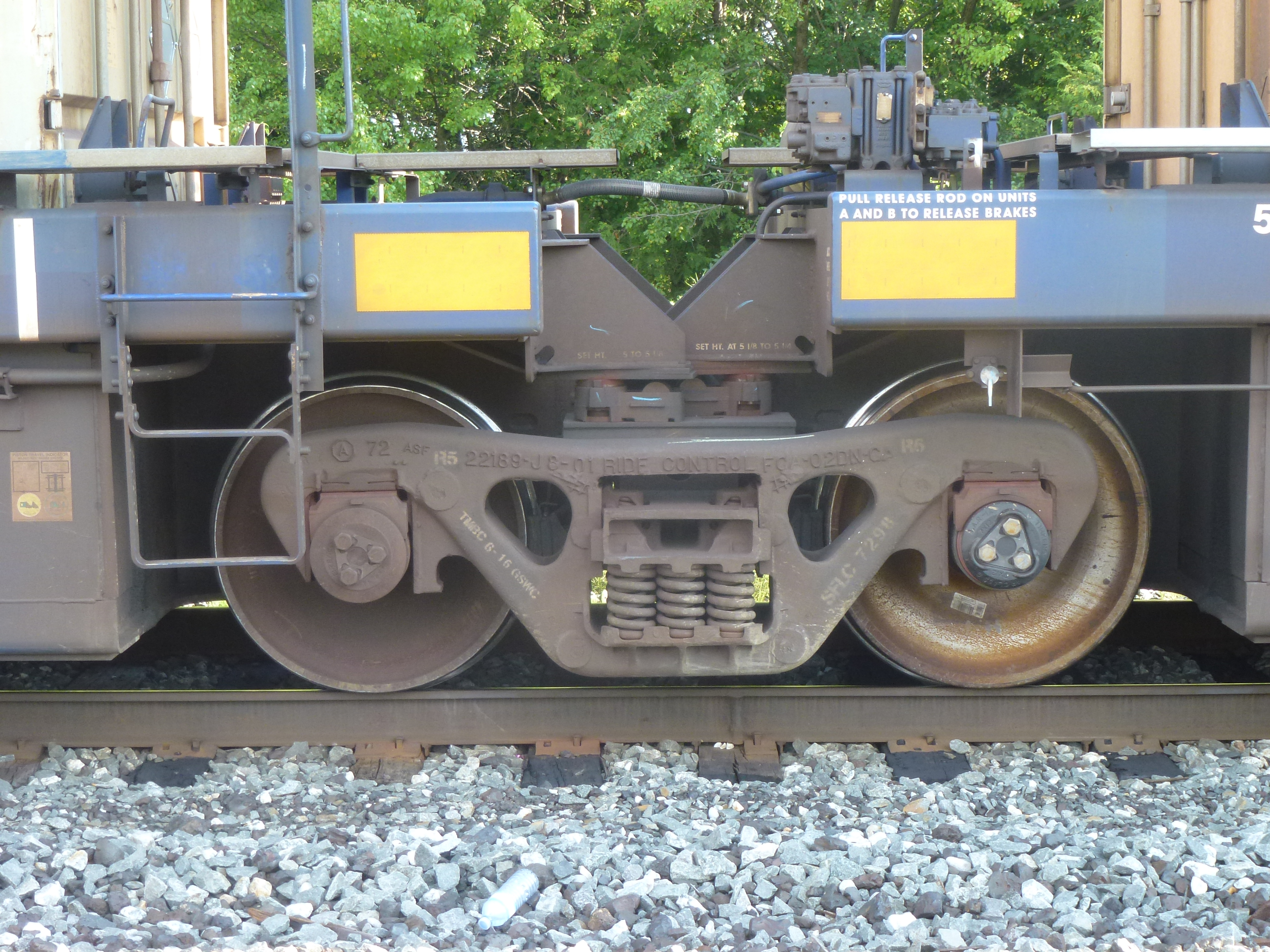
Closeup of a shared bogie with 4 specially adapted side bearings and an articulated connector between two sections of an articulated well car. The roller bearings are not enclosed by an axle box.

== See also ==
- Axle track
- Ball bearings, or roller bearings, which replaced journal bearings for interchange
- Glossary of North American railway terms
- Glossary of rail transport terms
- ICF Bogie
- Roller bearings, replaced journal bearings for interchange
- Rotation around a fixed axis
- Stuffing box
- Timmis system, an early form of coil spring used on railway axles
- Train wheel
- Wheelbase
- Wheelset
