= Louise Meiszner =

American pianist and music educator

Louise Meiszner (August 24, 1924 – June 30, 2008) was an American pianist and music educator. Her married name was Louise M. Nathanson.

The daughter of Lujza Eberhardt, a concert pianist, and John Meiszner, a flautist, both immigrants from Hungary, she was born in St. Louis, Missouri. A child prodigy, she began playing the piano at the age of three and gave her first public concert at the age of five. In 1930, the family moved back to Hungary, where she attended the Franz Liszt Academy of Music for eight years. At the age of thirteen, she was invited by Austrian composer Erich Kleiber to perform with his orchestra as a soloist. In 1938, she returned to the United States and appeared in concert with the Kansas City Philharmonic. She continued her education at the Juilliard School, graduating in May 1945. In the same year, she received the Leventritt Award.

Meiszner performed with most of major orchestras in the United States and Europe, including the New York Philharmonic Orchestra, the St. Louis Symphony Orchestra, the Chicago Symphony Orchestra and the Budapest Philharmonic Orchestra.

In 1959, she married Martin Jay Nathanson, an Illinois businessman; the couple had one child and Meiszner retired from performing. When her son Kevin began playing the flute during the early 1970s, she began playing again to accompany him. She also on occasion accompanied musicians performing in the Quad Cities area. During the 1980s, she began teaching part-time at Augustana College and Rivermont Collegiate.

Meiszner died at the Trinity Medical Center in Rock Island, Illinois at the age of 83.
