= Quad Cities Waterfront Convention Center =

Convention center

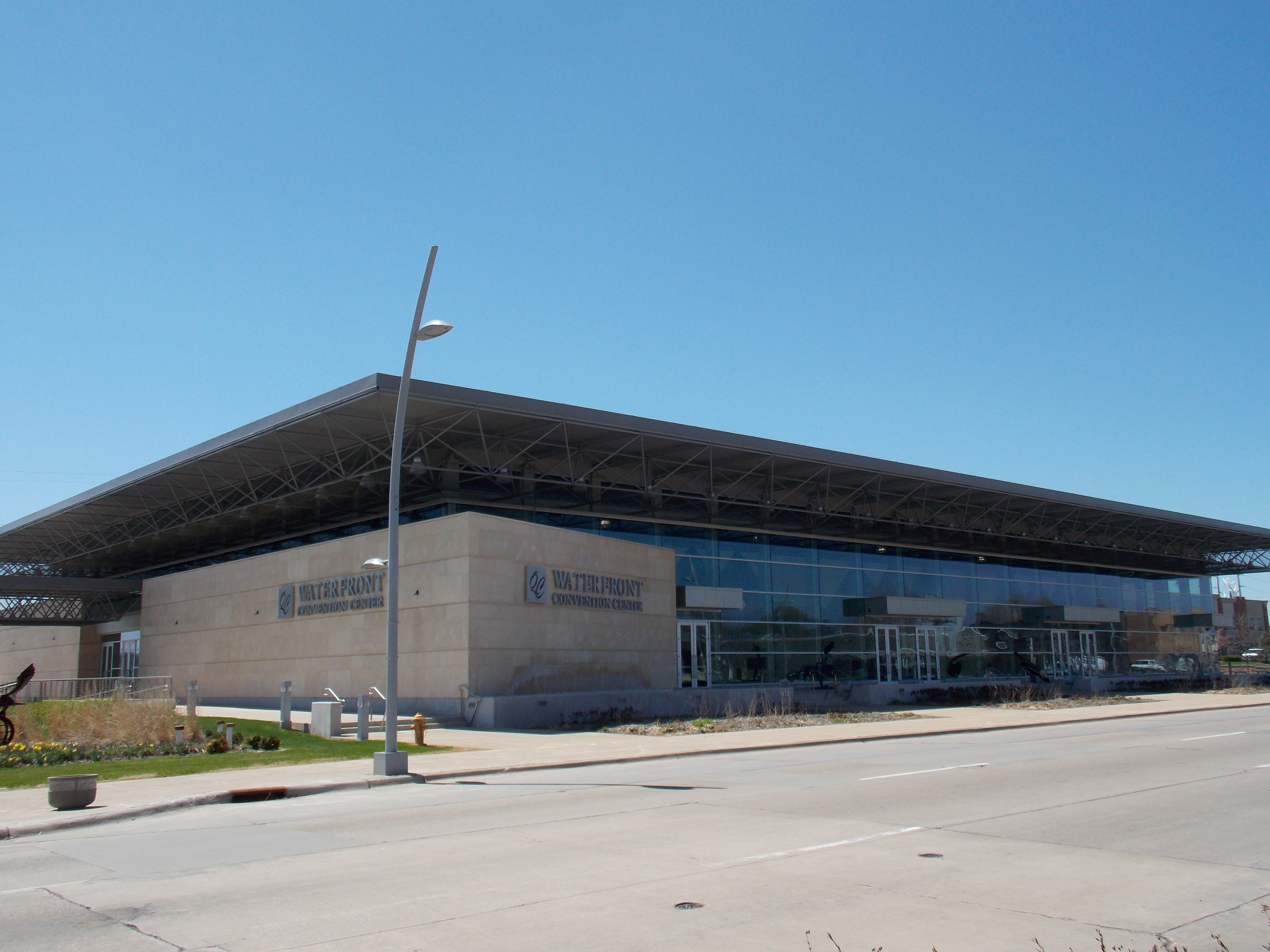

- Interactive map of
- Address: 2021 State Street
- Location: Bettendorf, Iowa
- Coordinates: 41.524861°N 90.504542°W
- Owner: City of Bettendorf

Construction
- Built: 2006-2008
- Opened: January 24, 2009
- Construction cost: $20 million

Website
- qcwcc.com

The Quad Cities Waterfront Convention Center is a convention center located in Bettendorf, Iowa, United States.

The name for the facility in the development stages was the Bettendorf Events Center. A ground breaking ceremony for the center was held on October 6, 2006. Construction was delayed in late 2006 because the project was $2 million over budget and the Isle of Capri, who was to operate the facility for the city, was completing a marketing study. Once construction got underway it was completed in early 2009.

The facility contains 24,000 sq ft (2,200 m^{2}) of space, which includes a 15,000 sq ft (1,400 m^{2}) ballroom and eight private meeting rooms. The convention center is owned by the city of Bettendorf and is operated by the Isle of Capri Casino & Hotel, which is connected by way of a skywalk.
