= Robert Smallwood (serial killer) =

American serial killer and rapist (born 1973)

- Smallwood at Little Sandy Correctional Complex in 2018
- Born: Robert Franklin Smallwood Jr. December 1973 (age 52); Lexington, Kentucky, U.S.
- Children: 3
- Convictions: Murder; First degree rape (2 counts); First degree sodomy; First degree robbery; First degree burglary
- Penalty: Life imprisonment without the possibility of parole

Details
- Victims: 3
- Span of crimes: 1999–2006
- Country: United States
- State: Kentucky
- Date apprehended: September 28, 2006

Robert Franklin Smallwood Jr. (born December 1973) is an American convicted serial killer who strangled three women to death in Lexington, Kentucky, from 1999 to 2006. The killings were thought to be unrelated until August 2006, when they were linked together through DNA testing. Smallwood was arrested the following month, pleaded guilty to each murder, and was sentenced to life imprisonment in 2007.

== Early life ==
Smallwood was born in December 1973 in Lexington. He had one sister, Elizabeth, who moved to North Carolina in her early adult years. There, she became the eighth murder victim of the Edgecombe County serial killer, who is currently still unidentified. In 1997, Robert married a woman named Neisha, and fathered five children. The couple later separated at an unknown date.

== Crimes ==
Smallwood committed his first serious crime in 1993, when he entered the home of 83-year-old retired schoolteacher Viola Green. Inside the house, he attacked Green, bound her wrists, and raped her, before leaving the house. Green survived with no injuries but later died from natural causes in 1998, never knowing the identity of her attacker. In 1998, Smallwood was arrested for a different sexual assault, that of a woman found tied to a tree, after his DNA was found on her purse. Smallwood was tried, but his defense argued that since the victim was a prostitute she must have consented to the sex, and he was acquitted a year later.

=== Murders ===
Following his acquittal, Smallwood continued committing assaults. In December 1999 he broke into the apartment of 48-year-old Dorris Ann Roberts. He gagged and strangled Roberts with her own clothing until her death. After a few days without seeing her, Roberts' neighbors broke into her apartment and found her body. Roberts had a history of alcohol abuse and domestic violence, and weeks before her murder, her roommate, Raymond Bean, had suffered a heart attack and died.

Three years later, Smallwood murdered his second victim, 29-year-old Sonora Allen. Allen was a Lexington native and mother of four daughters and two sons. She had also struggled with drug abuse. In August 2002, Allen met with her family on Fourth Street. Days later, on August 15, her body was found in the Fortune Pizza parking lot. It was ruled that she had been killed hours before; during that time, Smallwood had either strangled or smothered her to death due to her body showing no obvious wounds. Allen's shorts were pulled down to her thighs and her tank top was slightly pulled over her breast, signs she may have been sexually assaulted.

In May 2005, Smallwood was arrested for obtaining illegal substances, and in September of that year pleaded guilty to possession of drug paraphernalia and first-degree possession of a controlled substance. Afterwards, he was given a year of probation. While on probation, on April 6, 2006, Smallwood broke into 33-year-old Erica Butler's home, bound her wrists and strangled her to death. In June 2006, Smallwood was arrested violating his probation for an unrelated incident and sentenced to one year in prison.

== Investigation, arrest, and imprisonment ==
In August 2006, the Kentucky State Police Forensic Lab were able to confirm through DNA testing that the same man committed all three murder cases. Following the breakthrough police alerted the public of the at-large serial killer and urged anyone with further information to come forward. The police department formed a task force with about 20 people to investigate.

At the same time, the FBI joined the department in their search. Witnesses who were present during Butler's murder helped develop a sketch of the suspect, which was then handed out to residents who were interested in the search. In an attempt to locate the killer, DNA from him was submitted in national databases, but no matches were found. Lexington Police Chief Anthony Beatty said that a series of murders linked to a serial killer was unprecedented in the city.

While the investigation was going on, Smallwood was still in prison serving his one-year sentence. While in prison, his DNA was compared to the cases, and it matched, so he was charged with the murders along with the 1993 rape of Viola Green. When his arrest went public, Kentucky police called him Lexington's first serial killer. Smallwood pleaded not guilty, which meant he could have gone to trial for these crimes the following year. He eventually pleaded guilty, and, in 2007, received a life sentence without the possibility of parole.

== See also ==
- List of serial killers in the United States
