= Robert Smallwood (writer) =

American writer and technologist

Robert F. Smallwood is an American writer, technologist, magazine publisher, and podcast host. A prolific writer and speaker on information technology topics, he has published 10 books, and over 100 articles in trade journals and given more than 60 conference presentations. He was a chapter founder and president for AIIM International and was elected to its international Board of Directors in 1997, and the Board's executive committee in 1998. In 2014 he founded the Institute for Information Governance; in 2018 he co-founded "Information Governance World" magazine, and in 2020 he founded the Certified Information Governance Officers Association.

== Personal ==
Smallwood was born in 1959 in Davenport, Iowa. He grew up in nearby Bettendorf, where he was an academic, athletic, and musical standout, earning All-State Honors in Band (as a drummer), and Cross Country. He broke the freshman, sophomore, and varsity track records in the 2-mile run, indoors and outdoors, running 9:32.5, and in the 3000 meters, 8:48.8. He was also part of record-breaking 2-mile and 4 mile relay teams. In 1977 he earned his varsity letter in cross country as a freshman at University of Northern Iowa.

After attending the University of Massachusetts Boston on a scholarly exchange program he graduated from the University of Northern Iowa in 1982 with honors and degrees in Business Management and Psychology. In 2000, Smallwood completed work on his Master of Business Administration degree at Loyola University New Orleans.

Smallwood moved to New Orleans where he worked for Burroughs Corporation (later Unisys after a merger with Sperry) implementing mainframe computer and document management systems for commercial banks and the Federal Reserve Bank branch in New Orleans. Later he worked for Wang Laboratories where he implemented some of the first commercially available document imaging systems, and law firm software.

In 1988 he published a paper, "Implementing Document Imaging in Financial Services Applications" internally for Wang. In 1991 he became an independent IT consultant and in 1995 he merged with and co-founded IMERGE Consulting. In 2014, he founded the Institute for Information Governance, and published the world's first textbook on Information Governance through Wiley & Sons. The second edition was released in 2020.

== The Five People You Meet in Hell: Surviving Katrina ==
Smallwood's first book, The Five People You Meet in Hell: Surviving Katrina, was published in 2005. The book is Smallwood's account of his experience during the storm and in its aftermath. It was the first personal account of the disaster to be published. "One of the "five people" was Smallwood's friend and neighbor Harry Anderson, the comic actor who starred in Night Court, a popular 1980's sitcom.

In 2006, Smallwood embarked on a 21-city book tour and interviews on C-SPAN (BookTV), BBC Radio, The Washington Post, The Wall Street Journal, ABCNews.com and other major media outlets. The book was optioned for film in November, 2013, by Safier Entertainment under the working title, A Season in Hell The title was borrowed from the extended poem of the same name by French writer Arthur Rimbaud.

== Other publications ==
2005 "Brando, Tennessee & Me." - his first play
2007 "Prisoners of Katrina"
2009 "Jackson Squared" - his first novel

== Information governance publications ==
In 2008, Smallwood published his first nonfiction technology book, "Taming the Email Tiger".

In 2012, Wiley & Sons published Smallwood's 'WikiLeaks prevention guide' entitled, "Safeguarding Critical E-Documents: Implementing a Program for Securing Confidential Information Assets" and in 2013, in collaboration with nine subject matter experts (SME), "Managing Electronic Records: Methods, Best Practices, and Technologies." A third book in the Wiley CIO series "Information Governance: Concepts, Strategies, and Best Practices" was released in April 2014, and the second edition in January, 2020. That book is being used to guide corporate IG programs, and to teach information governance to graduate students at University of Oxford, Haaga-Helia University of Applied Sciences in Helsinki, Finland, San Jose State and other major universities. In April 2016 Smallwood published, "Information Governance for Executives: Fundamentals and Strategies, and in 2018, "Information Governance for Healthcare Professionals," was published by HIMSS and Taylor & Francis (under CRC imprint). Also in 2018, Smallwood founded "Information Governance World" magazine, the first magazine dedicated to coverage of Information Governance. In 2020, "Information Governance" 2nd Edition was published by Wiley.

== Black & White Ball - Hurricane Katrina fundraiser ==
As the executive director of the Louisiana Writers' Foundation, Smallwood was responsible for organizing a "Black & White Ball" at the Hotel Monteleone on the 40th anniversary of Truman Capote's famous New York event. The event was held to raise donations for writers struggling to return to post-Katrina New Orleans, in conjunction with Habitat for Humanity. Honorees included noted Romanian writer and New Orleans resident Andrei Codrescu, Louisiana Poet Laureate Brenda Marie Osbey, and poet Dave Brinks. News anchor Angela Hill emceed the festivities.
