= Rivermont Collegiate =

Private school in Bettendorf, Iowa, United States

Location
- 1821 Sunset Drive; Bettendorf, Iowa 52722; United States; 41.529294°N 90.508066°W

Information
- Former name: St. Katherine's/St. Mark's
- Type: Private College Preparatory
- Religious affiliation: Nonsectarian
- Established: September 24, 1884
- Founder: Bishop William Stevens Perry
- Headmaster: Collin Lawrence (interim)
- Faculty: 30
- Grades: PreK - 12th
- Gender: Coed
- Age range: 2-18
- Enrollment: 170 (2023-24)
- Student to teacher ratio: 6.1
- Colors: Red, black, and white
- Accreditation: National Association of Independent Schools (NAIS)
- Yearbook: The Wheel
- Website: rivermontcollegiate.org

Rivermont Collegiate, formerly St. Katharine's/St. Mark's School, is a nonsectarian, independent, multicultural, college preparatory school for students two years old through twelfth grade, located in the Quad Cities in Bettendorf, Iowa, in the United States. Rivermont Collegiate is a member of the National Association of Independent Schools (NAIS), specifically the Independent Schools Association of the Central States (ISACS), the College Entrance Examination Board (CEEB), Council for Advance and Support of Education (CASE), and the National Honor Society (NHS). The school currently resides on the former property of Joseph Bettendorf, namesake of the city.

== History ==
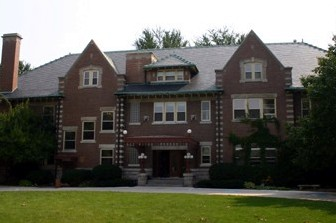
The Joseph Bettendorf Mansion which now houses the upper school. Under the mansion is a tunnel which serves as a tornado and fallout shelter.

In 1846, a group of transplanted New England Congregationalists with a strong social-reformer orientation formed the Trustees of Iowa College. Although founded in Davenport, Iowa, Iowa College moved from its Davenport location to the town of Grinnell after being invited by Josiah Bushnell Grinnell to move to his newly founded town, located at the intersection of two major railroads. The Davenport location was later renamed to Griswold College, after Bishop Alexander Viets Griswold of the Eastern Diocese of the Episcopal Church. Griswold College began growing slowly, adding a theological department, and Kemper Hall (which served as a boys' school).

In 1883, the trustees of Griswold College received a legacy from the estate of Miss Sarah Burr (an eastern churchwoman), for the establishment of a Church School for Christian girls in the Episcopal Diocese of Iowa. These funds were invested in Cambria Place, a magnificent residence designed by a famous architect (who designed the Illinois State Capitol and the Chicago Board of Trade Building), with five acres of land, high on a bluff overlooking the Mississippi River in Davenport, Iowa. On September 24, 1884, Bishop William Stevens Perry founded St. Katharine's School, which was placed high among college preparatory schools in the country. Meanwhile, Griswold college, theological department and boys' school were forced to close in the 1890s.

The school was originally organized as St. Katharine's School, an Episcopal boarding and day school for girls. Located at 10th and Tremont Streets in Davenport, for over eighty years the school educated local girls as well as those from afar. However, St. Katharine's later dropped its boarding program, became co-educational, in 1968 adding St. Mark's to its name to reflect the change.

In 1973, St. Katharine's St. Mark's moved to its current location, the former home of Joseph Bettendorf, and by 1980, the school amicably broke ties with the Episcopal Church. In 2001, the board of trustees voted to change the name of the school to Rivermont Collegiate, in order to reduce confusion about its religious affiliation.

=== The early days ===
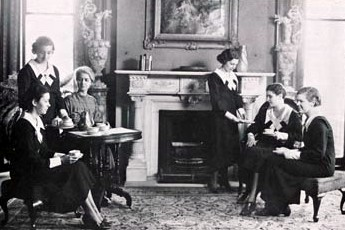
St. Katharine's in the very beginning

The girls who attended St. Katharine's were subject to strict rules. Students were not allowed to have books, magazines, or newspapers delivered without the principal's permission. Students could not keep any food except for fruit. Students couldn't go to town without a parent or teacher, and no student could spend the night out of the building. The only time students could go home was on Thursdays, but only until 8:00 p.m. The girls were not allowed to wear jewelry, big dresses, or silk dresses. One hour of exercise was required every day.

In 1910, the taxpayers of Davenport gave an observatory and telescope to the school but it burned to the ground in a fire.

Meanwhile, local industrialist Joseph Bettendorf was building his dream house, which later became the signature building of Rivermont Collegiate. Mr. Bettendorf, whose Bettendorf Company manufactured truck frames for railroad cars, helped draw the plans for an English Manor style mansion on a bluff overlooking the Mississippi River. In 1915, he supervised construction of the mansion, complete with a sweeping terraced lawn overlooking the Mississippi.

Designed for entertaining railroad executives and community members, the house included a stained glass domed conservatory, formal dining room, parlor, music room, and billiard room. The second floor contained several bedrooms, a large sitting room, and servant quarters. A ballroom was located on the third floor, and at one time two bowling alleys were located in the basement. Craftsmen added Italian marble, carved stone, molded plaster and hand-carved woodwork, doors, paneling and staircases throughout the home.

== The campus ==
Rivermont Collegiate campus consists of five buildings on the former Joseph Bettendorf property:

The Mansion, which is the former home of Joseph Bettendorf, now houses upper school and middle school classes, as well as administrative offices.

The Carriage House, formerly Joseph Bettendorf's garage, is now rebuilt as a boarding house for boarding students. The ribbon cutting for the opening of the rebuilt Carriage House was on July 31, 2017.

Becherer Hall was completed in 1999 and houses the lower school and early childhood program, as well as the auditorium and cafeteria.

The Gym serves as a basketball and volleyball court. It was added to the mansion in 1974.

The STEAM Center was completed in 2019 on the old site of the Wallace House, which was demolished on December 19, 2017. This building includes science, technology, engineering, art, and math classrooms on the first 2 levels, as well as 2 floors capable of holding 32 dorm students, in a 22,000 square foot space. It was estimated to cost $6 million.

== Notable people ==
- Jim Dietz, coach and author
- Alejandra Lillo, designer
- Louise Meiszner, pianist

== See also ==
- List of high schools in Iowa
