= Bettendorf, Iowa =

- City
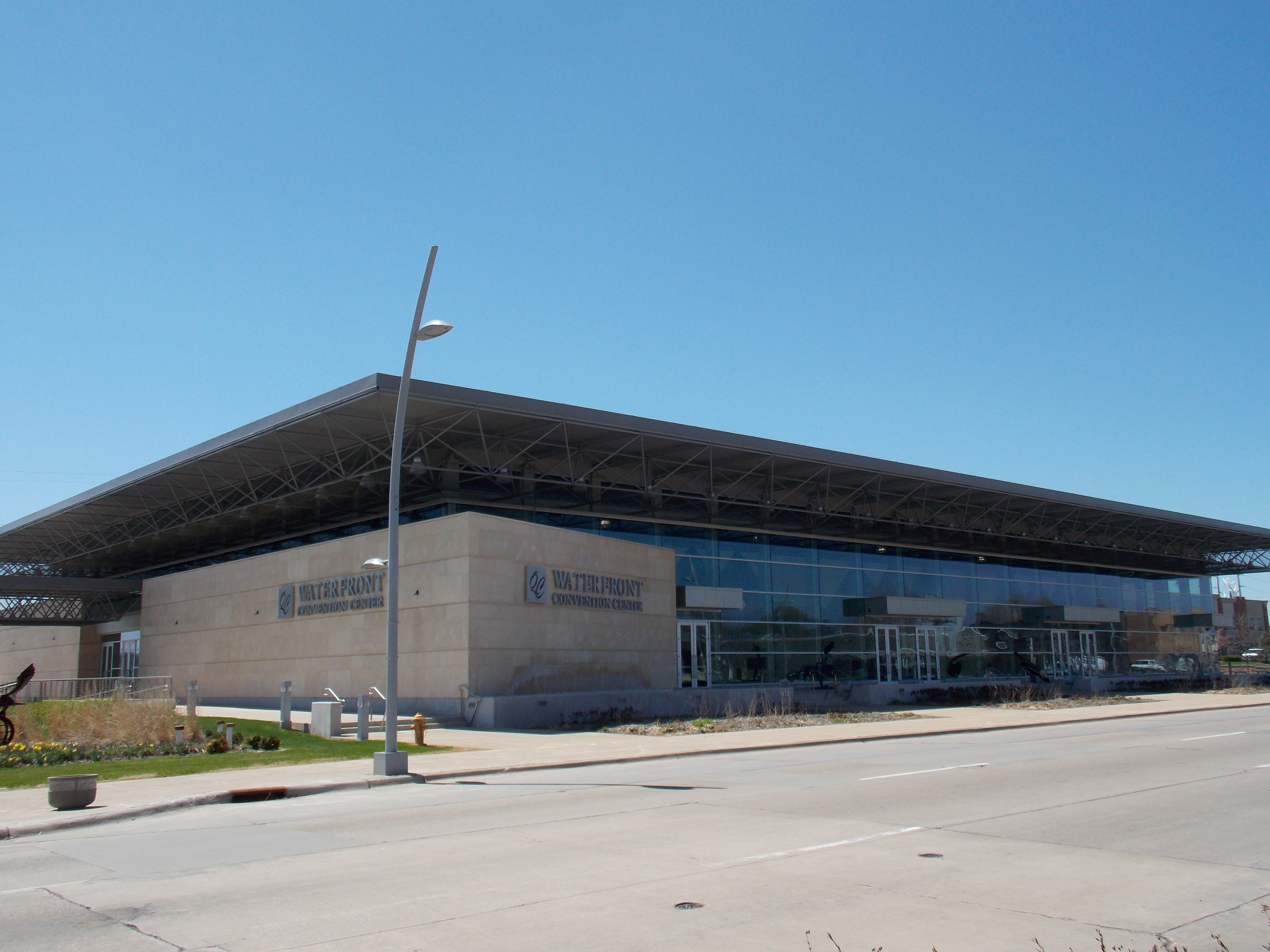
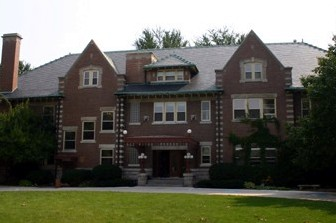
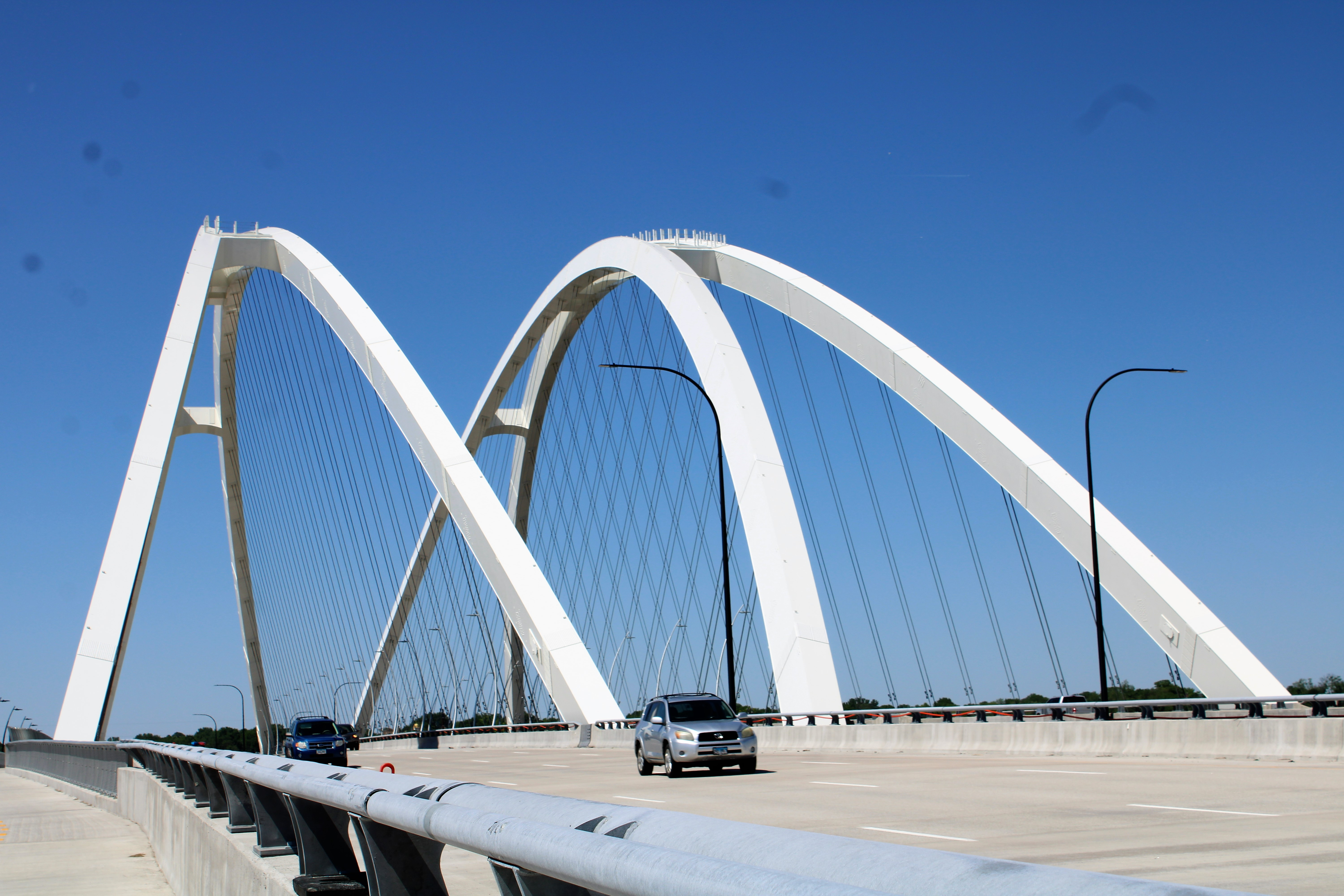
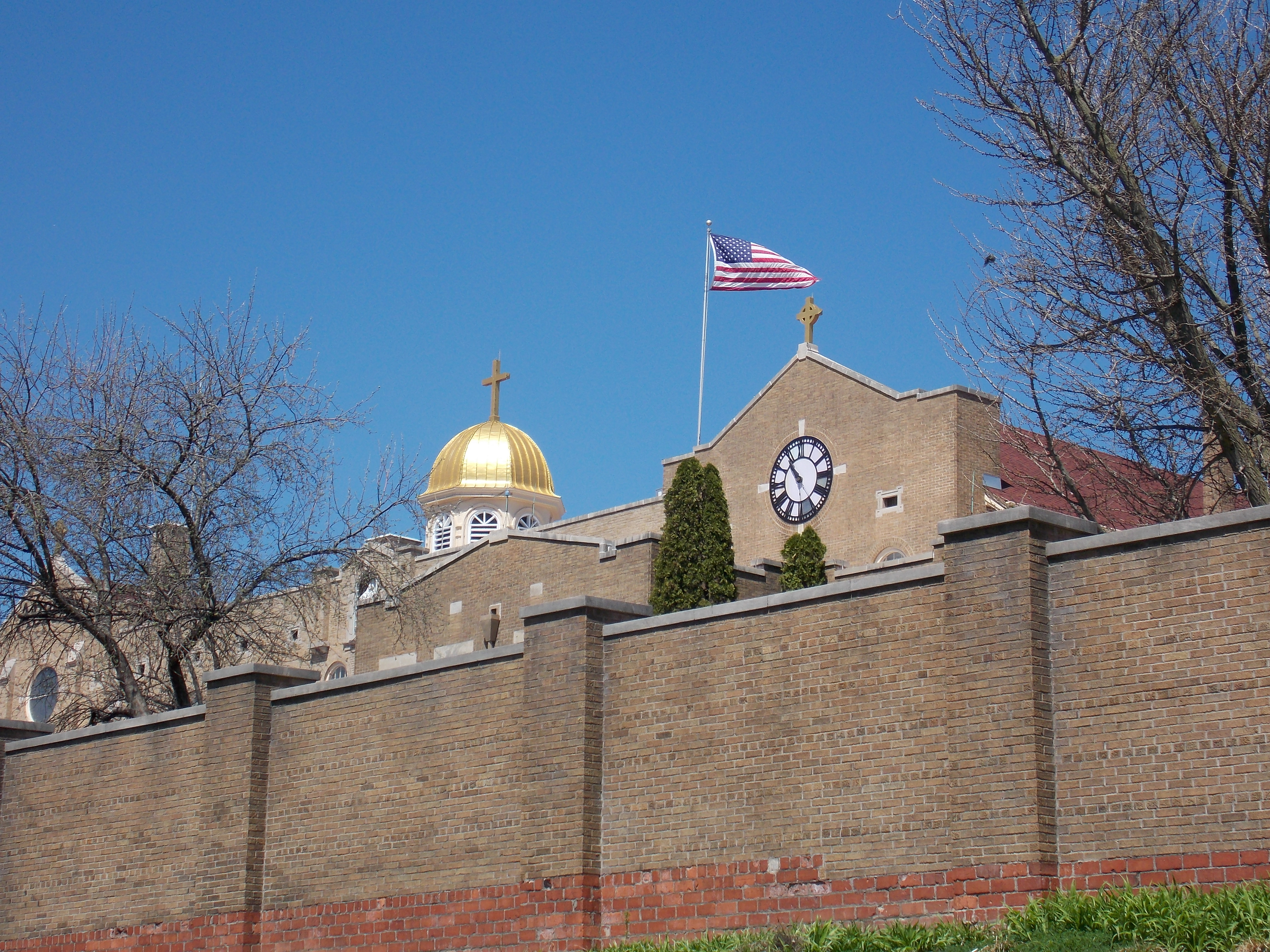
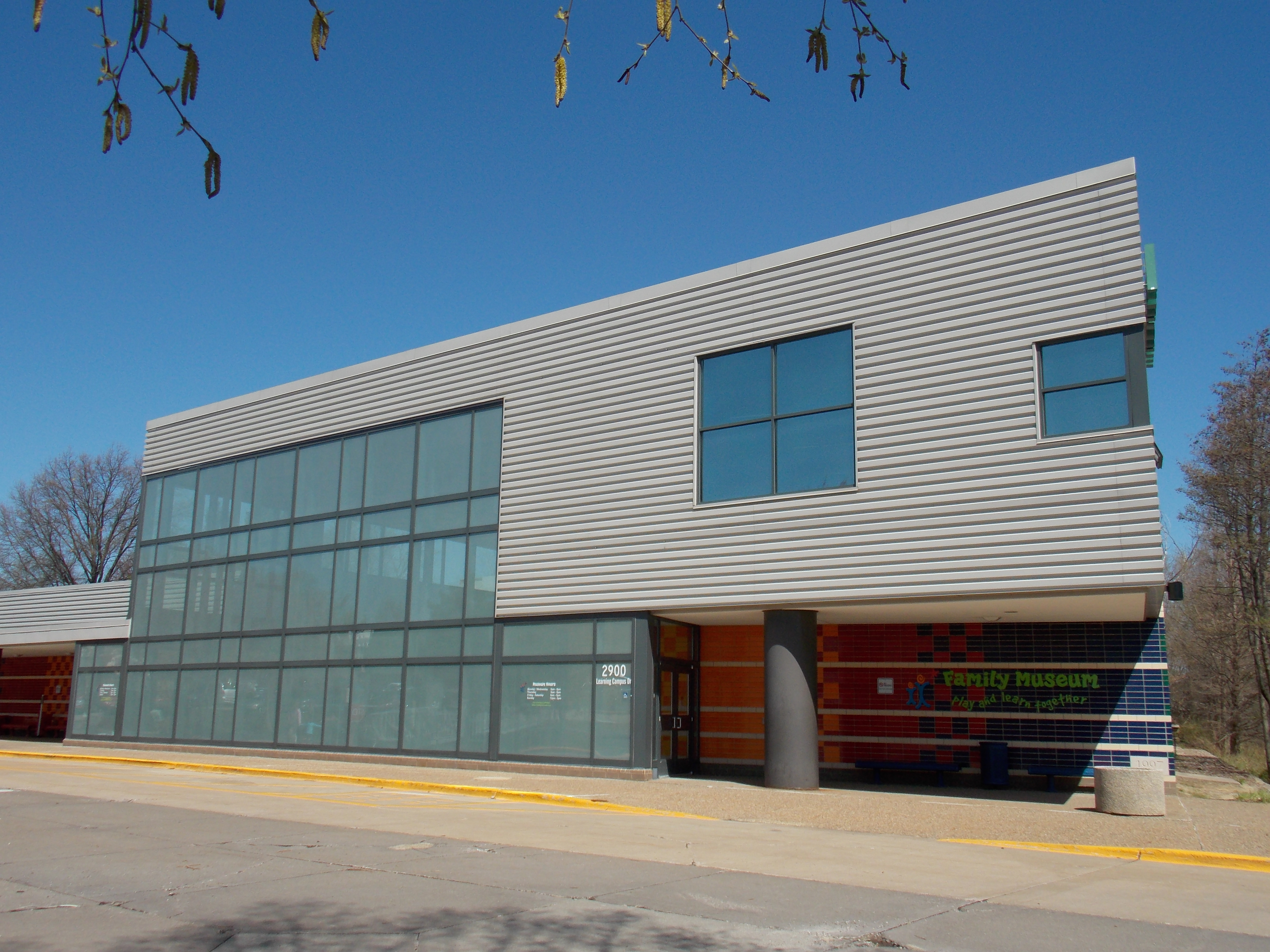
- Quad Cities Waterfront Convention Center Joseph W. Bettendorf House Interstate 74 Bridge The former Regina Coeli Monastery Family Museum

- Flag
- Motto: A Premier City
- Location in Scott County, Iowa

- Location in Iowa Location in the United States
- Coordinates: 41°33′20″N 90°29′37″W
- Country: United States
- State: Iowa
- County: Scott
- Incorporated: 1903

Government
  - Type: Mayor-council government
  - Mayor: Robert Gallagher

Area
  - Total: 22.43 sq mi (58.09 km^{2})
  - Land: 21.30 sq mi (55.17 km^{2})
  - Water: 1.13 sq mi (2.92 km^{2})
- Elevation: 666 ft (203 m)

Population (2020)
  - Total: 39,102
  - Estimate (2025): 40,710
  - Rank: 15th in Iowa
  - Density: 1,835.7/sq mi (708.75/km^{2})
- Time zone: UTC-6 (Central)
  - Summer (DST): UTC-5 (CDT)
- ZIP code: 52722
- Area code: 563
- FIPS code: 19-06355
- GNIS feature ID: 2394157
- Website: bettendorf.org

Bettendorf is a city in Scott County, Iowa, United States. The population was 39,102 at the 2020 census. Bettendorf is one of the five cities that comprise the Quad Cities region along the Mississippi River. It is located adjacent to Davenport, Iowa, and across the river from Moline, East Moline, and Rock Island in Illinois. The Quad Cities metropolitan area had a population of 384,324 as of the 2020 census.

== History ==
Bettendorf lies in the original Wisconsin Territory, which the United States bought from the Sac and Fox Indians after defeating them in the Black Hawk War. The territory was ceded in the Black Hawk Purchase of 1832. The first European-American settlers established a village they called Lilienthal, after an early tavern and dance hall. The village of Gilbert developed alongside Lilienthal in 1858, honoring Elias Gilbert, who platted the original site. At that time, the residents were predominantly German immigrants and worked as farmers, skilled laborers, and small business owners. The two villages eventually combined to become the town of Gilbert.

Circa 1900, the town gave William and Joseph Bettendorf 70 acres (280,000 m^{2}) of riverfront land on the condition that they move their iron wagon business from Davenport to Gilbert. In 1903, the town of 440 citizens petitioned for incorporation, requesting to change the town's name in honor of the brothers whose factory was a major economic influence in the early development of the city.

In the late 1940s, Aluminum Company of America (A.L.C.O.A.) chose Riverdale, an enclave of Bettendorf, for construction of the world's largest aluminum mill. The huge mill, and the attendant developments from it, created thousands of jobs and greatly increased growth in Bettendorf's population, which has continued to the present day.

The first modern-day riverboat casinos in the United States were launched in Bettendorf on April 1, 1991 by local businessman Bernard Goldstein. He went on to found the Isle of Capri Casinos. Goldstein and his family members also operate Alter Companies, which is a scrap metal, barge and towboat company operating on the river waterfront. The Quad Cities Waterfront Convention Center opened by the casino and hotel in 2009. It is owned by the city and operated by the Isle of Capri.

== Geography ==
According to the United States Census Bureau, the city has a total area of 22.43 square miles (58.09 km^{2}), of which 21.3 square miles (55.17 km^{2}) is land and 1.13 square miles (2.93 km^{2}) is water.

The city of Bettendorf is located along the banks of the Mississippi River. Because of this, the city of Bettendorf goes through a great deal of flooding and deals annually with stormwater runoff. In 2000, Missman, Stanley & Associates prepared a Comprehensive Storm Water study on all 14 of the city's drainage ways. This study included future Capital Improvement Projects. The City of Bettendorf's Stormwater Section will be the organization to implement this comprehensive plan. There are 169 inlets that have found to be insufficient and not working to proper code for handling rainfall over 1.25 inches and in handling of rainfall into all city creeks. Due to this, several creeks such as Crow Creek, Pigeon Creek, Spencer Creek, and others are continuing to flow and destroy personal property because of not handling the water being put into the creek properly and having the creek banks secured. The City of Bettendorf has been collecting storm water fees on water bills to maintain and resolve these issues.

Efforts are focused on improving surface water quality which will in turn improve the quality of drinking water, increase viability for fish and decrease flooding. The plan includes the repair and cleaning of roadside pipes and ditches, replacing small culverts with larger ones and maintaining the system on a regular basis. Routine inspections are performed during dry weather to detect and address illicit discharges.

=== Climate ===
Climate data for Bettendorf
Month	Jan	Feb	Mar	Apr	May	Jun	Jul	Aug	Sep	Oct	Nov	Dec	Year
Record high °F (°C)	63 (17)	68 (20)	83 (28)	88 (31)	93 (34)	100 (38)	102 (39)	103 (39)	97 (36)	90 (32)	78 (26)	69 (21)	103 (39)
Mean daily maximum °F (°C)	29 (−2)	35 (2)	47 (8)	60 (16)	72 (22)	82 (28)	85 (29)	83 (28)	76 (24)	64 (18)	47 (8)	34 (1)	60 (15)
Mean daily minimum °F (°C)	13 (−11)	19 (−7)	30 (−1)	41 (5)	53 (12)	62 (17)	65 (18)	66 (19)	57 (14)	45 (7)	32 (0)	20 (−7)	42 (6)
Record low °F (°C)	−23 (−31)	−28 (−33)	−14 (−26)	11 (−12)	28 (−2)	42 (6)	48 (9)	43 (6)	32 (0)	18 (−8)	−4 (−20)	−21 (−29)	−28 (−33)
Average precipitation inches (mm)	1.13 (29)	1.28 (33)	2.37 (60)	3.21 (82)	3.76 (96)	4.71 (120)	3.51 (89)	4.31 (109)	2.96 (75)	2.46 (62)	2.39 (61)	2.02 (51)	34.11 (866)

== Demographics ==
Historical population

Year	Pop.	±%
1910	909	—
1920	2,178	+139.6%
1930	2,768	+27.1%
1940	3,143	+13.5%
1950	5,132	+63.3%

Year	Pop.	±%
1960	11,534	+124.7%
1970	22,126	+91.8%
1980	27,381	+23.8%
1990	28,139	+2.8%
2000	31,275	+11.1%

Year	Pop.	±%
2010	33,217	+6.2%
2020	39,102	+17.7%
2025 (est.)	40,710	+4.1%

Source: Data from U.S. Census Bureau
U.S. Decennial Census
2020 Census
2022 estimate

=== 2020 census ===
As of the 2020 census, Bettendorf had a population of 39,102 and a population density of 1,835.6 inhabitants per square mile (708.7/km^{2}). The median age was 39.9 years. 25.6% of residents were under the age of 18 and 17.6% of residents were 65 years of age or older. For every 100 females there were 95.3 males, and for every 100 females age 18 and over there were 92.6 males age 18 and over.

There were 15,708 households in Bettendorf, of which 33.6% had children under the age of 18 living in them. Of all households, 53.8% were married-couple households, 16.1% were households with a male householder and no spouse or partner present, and 24.6% were households with a female householder and no spouse or partner present. About 28.2% of all households were made up of individuals and 13.2% had someone living alone who was 65 years of age or older.

There were 16,697 housing units at an average density of 783.8 per square mile (302.6/km^{2}), of which 5.9% were vacant. The homeowner vacancy rate was 1.5% and the rental vacancy rate was 8.9%.

99.5% of residents lived in urban areas, while 0.5% lived in rural areas.

Racial composition as of the 2020 census
Race	Number	Percent
White	32,204	82.4%
Black or African American	1,455	3.7%
American Indian and Alaska Native	92	0.2%
Asian	2,413	6.2%
Native Hawaiian and Other Pacific Islander	14	0.0%
Some other race	506	1.3%
Two or more races	2,418	6.2%
Hispanic or Latino (of any race)	2,056	5.3%

=== 2010 census ===
As of the census of 2010, there were 33,217 people, 13,681 households, and 9,225 families residing in the city. The population density was 1,565.4 inhabitants per square mile (604.4/km^{2}). There were 14,437 housing units at an average density of 680.3 per square mile (262.7/km^{2}). The racial makeup of the city was 91.9% White, 2.2% African American, 0.2% Native American, 3.1% Asian, 0.1% Pacific Islander, 0.7% from other races, and 1.8% from two or more races. Hispanic or Latino of any race were 3.6% of the population.

There were 13,681 households, of which 33.0% had children under the age of 18 living with them, 55.7% were married couples living together, 8.4% had a female householder with no husband present, 3.3% had a male householder with no wife present, and 32.6% were non-families. 28.2% of all households were made up of individuals, and 11.5% had someone living alone who was 65 years of age or older. The average household size was 2.42 and the average family size was 2.97.

The median age in the city was 40.7 years. 25.5% of residents were under the age of 18; 5.9% were between the ages of 18 and 24; 24.6% were from 25 to 44; 29.2% were from 45 to 64; and 14.8% were 65 years of age or older. The gender makeup of the city was 48.6% male and 51.4% female.

== Government ==
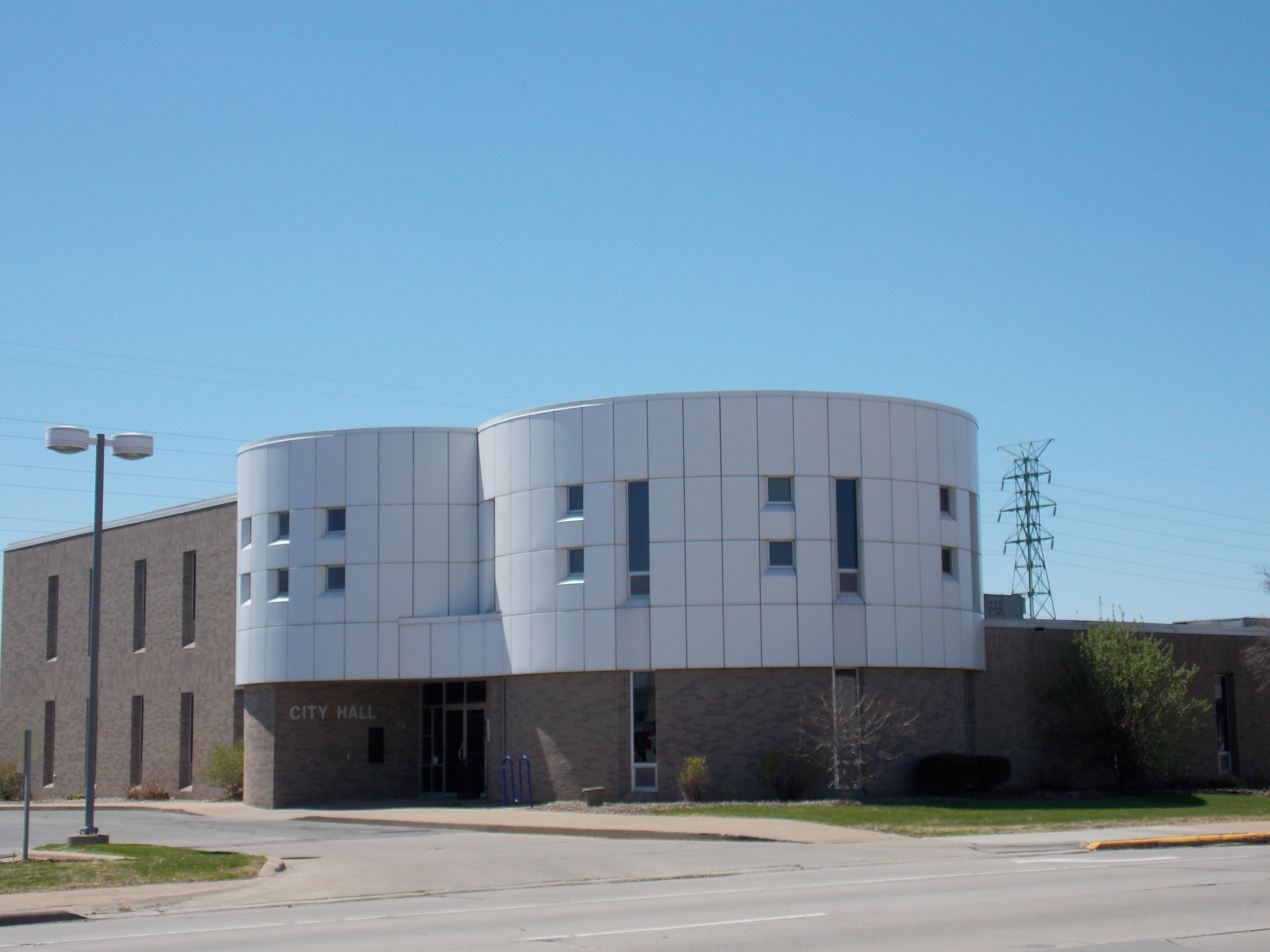
City Hall

Bettendorf has a mayor and city council form of government with seven city council members. Two council members are elected at-large, while the other five are elected by each of the city's five wards. Bettendorf's current mayor is Robert Gallagher. Council members are Frank Baden (at-large), Lisa Brown (at-large), Jerry Sechser (1st ward), Scott Naumann (2nd Ward), Gregory Jager (3rd Ward), Greg Adamson (4th ward), Nick Palczynski (5th ward).

== Education ==
Bettendorf is home to two school districts, the Bettendorf Community School District and Pleasant Valley Community School District. The Bettendorf Community School District covers most areas of central, northern and western Bettendorf. Elementary students are assigned to one of five elementary schools; the district also operates a middle and Bettendorf High School. A seven-member board of education represents district residents. The Pleasant Valley Community School District encompasses areas of eastern Bettendorf, as well as the outlying communities of Pleasant Valley, Riverdale and LeClaire. Located inside the city limits are four of the district's six elementary schools. Both high schools are part of the Mississippi Athletic Conference for sports.

The Bettendorf, Pleasant Valley, and North Scott school districts operate a consortium alternative high school, Edison Academy, in downtown Bettendorf. The Mississippi Bend Area Education Agency, one of nine such agencies in the state of Iowa, operates a Learning Center in the former Bettendorf High School building in central Bettendorf, offering professional development and continuing education services for educators, as well as driver education and home school testing services for students.

Also located within the city limits are Rivermont Collegiate, a nonsectarian, independent, multicultural, college-preparatory school for preschool through 12th-grade students; Lourdes Catholic School, a Roman Catholic school for preschool through 8th-grade students; and Morning Star Academy, a Christian school for preschool through 12th-grade students. Rivermont Collegiate operates in the former mansion of J.W. Bettendorf, namesake of the city.

Scott Community College, part of the Eastern Iowa Community College District, is located in Riverdale with a Bettendorf address. Upper Iowa University operates its Quad Cities Center in Bettendorf.

== Transportation ==
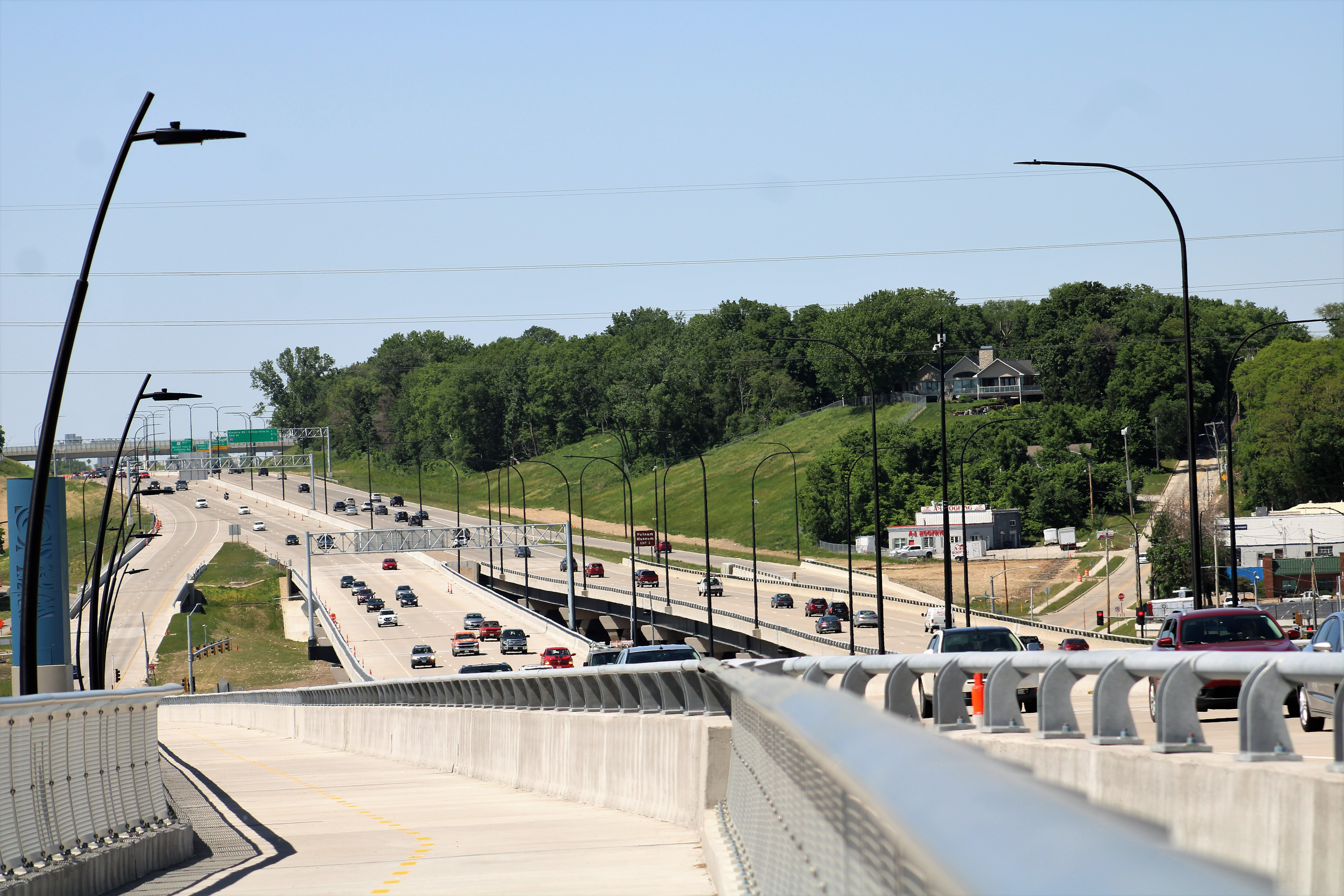
Interstate 74 Bridge approach in Bettendorf

Beginning in 2012, a portion of downtown Bettendorf's buildings were torn down to make way for the new I-74 Bridge project and as part of a corresponding downtown Bettendorf redevelopment. The original I-74 twin bridge span was built in 1935 and the second in 1959. The I-74 Bridge project will demolish the original twin spans and construct a new I-74 bridge over the Mississippi River. The 1.2 billion dollar bridge project began construction in July 2017 and was completed in 2021. The project converted Grant Street, in the vicinity of I-74, to a two-way street with three lanes in each direction. New commercial and residential construction in downtown Bettendorf has occurred in the redesigned corridor. The I-74 bridge connects Bettendorf and Moline, Illinois.

== Notable people ==
- Pat Angerer, linebacker, drafted in the 2010 NFL draft by the Indianapolis Colts
- Chris Anthony, arena football player
- Tavian Banks, (born 1974) NFL player, Big Ten Conference player of the year, first-team All-American
- Darien Porter, cornerback, drafted in the 2025 NFL Draft by the Las Vegas Raiders
- Scott Beck, filmmaker, writer/producer of A Quiet Place
- Joseph W. Bettendorf, (1864 – 1933) businessman. Co-founded Bettendorf Axle Company. With his brother William, namesake of Bettendorf, Iowa. Built Joseph Bettendorf House.
- William P. Bettendorf, (1857 – 1910) industrialist and inventor. Co-founded Bettendorf Axle Company. With his brother Joseph, namesake of Bettendorf, Iowa.
- Louie Conn, NFL Cheerleader for the Minnesota Vikings
- Jack Fleck, (1921–2014) golfer who won the 1955 U.S. Open.
- Bernard Goldstein, (1929–2009), Attorney and businessman. Founder of Isle of Capri Casinos.
- Michael Grumley, (1942–1988) writer
- Butch Harmon, (born 1945) PGA Tour golfer, golf coach.
- Eduvie Ikoba, (born 1997) professional soccer player
- Tega Ikoba, (born 2003) professional soccer player
- Hazel Keener, actress
- Mark Kerr, (born 1968) Mixed Martial Arts (MMA) fighter and subject of the HBO documentary entitled The Smashing Machine,
- Robbie Lawler, (born 1982) former Ultimate Fighting Championship Welterweight champion
- Johnny Lujack, (1925–2023) 1947 Heisman Trophy.
- Rory Markham, mixed martial artist
- Drew McFedries, mixed martial artist
- Pat Miletich, mixed martial artist and trainer, first Ultimate Fighting Championship (UFC) Welterweight Champion in 1998
- Eric Christian Olsen, (born 1977) actor, NCIS: Los Angeles, Dumb and Dumberer 2
- Linnea Quigley (born 1958), Actress
- Yung Skeeter, American DJ, producer, director, manager, and recording artist
- Robert Smallwood, writer
- Tim Sylvia, (born 1976) former Ultimate Fighting Championship Heavyweight champion
- Bryan Woods, filmmaker, writer/producer of A Quiet Place
