= American Evangelical Christian Churches =

Religious denomination

The American Evangelical Christian Churches is a denomination, with the aim of 'Security with Liberty', enabling orthodox Christian evangelical ministers the opportunity to minister without particular decrees about non-essential Christian doctrines. The AECC is headquartered in Indianapolis, Indiana.

== History ==
It was founded in Chicago in 1944. Any member of the church is required to accept the following seven articles of faith:

In 2006, there were 17,400 members in 192 congregations. The organization was formerly headquartered in Pineland, Florida since the 1970s. The same city is the site of the group's retreat center and the American Bible College, an associated institution which offers distance education courses.

== Seven Articles of Faith ==
- the Bible is the written Word of God
- the Holy Trinity
- the Virgin Birth
- the deity of Jesus Christ
- salvation through atonement of Jesus, the Christ.
- that prayer is essential to the life of the Christian
- the Second Coming.

All other beliefs are optional. This specifically includes the dispute regarding free will and predestination.

== Ordination and Licensure ==
Like other mainline Christian denominations, the AECC has a process of theological testing, by where applicants respond to a lengthy investigation of their beliefs. The denomination wants to see how well-formed the applicant's theology is, and by what means do the applicant's beliefs find their grounding. After review, if the applicant is deemed to be orthodox and rooted in their Christian faith, the AECC chooses to offer Licensed Minister status to the new member. The member is then freed to minister in all ways shy of performing marriages. After a year of good-standing as a Licensed Minister, the AECC member may apply for Ordination status. The member must then come before the governing board of the denomination at its headquarters in Indianapolis and go through a formal face-to-face interview process at its annual conference. If the member conveys maturity and a practical theological stance for ministry in the world in the name of Jesus Christ, the member is approved for ordination. Ordination takes place in the context of worship through the laying on of hands.

The denomination is unique in that it recognizes dual ordination status with most other mainline Christian denominations. The denomination is attracting members of 'Generation X' and 'Generation Y' Christians who seek professional ministerial status after having grown up in an 'nondenominational' or 'interdenominational' church culture. The AECC ordains both female and male ministers called by God for service in the world.

== American Evangelical Christian University ==
Affiliated with the denomination is a Christian university, titled American Evangelical Christian University. The American Evangelical Christian University offers coursework intended to inform individuals' faith in Christ and upon graduation, hopes that they might "emerge as a disciple of Jesus Christ with a deeper understanding and appreciation of the Christian faith."
