= William P. Bettendorf =

Inventor, industrialist

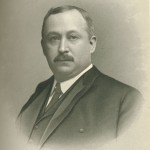
- Born: July 1, 1857; Mendota, Illinois, US
- Died: June 3, 1910 (aged 52); Bettendorf, Iowa, US
- Resting place: Oakdale Memorial Gardens; Davenport, Iowa; 41.546°N 90.55°W
- Occupation(s): Inventor, Industrialist
- Known for: Invented power lift sulky plow, the Bettendorf metal wheel and the one-piece railroad truck frame
- Spouses: Mary Wortman (1879–1901); Elizabeth Staby (1908–1910)
- Children: Etta, Henry

William P. Bettendorf (July 1, 1857 – June 3, 1910) was an American inventor. He is credited with the invention of the power lift sulky plow, the Bettendorf metal wheel and the one-piece railroad truck frame. By the age of 53 he held 94 patents. With his younger brother, Joseph W. Bettendorf, he founded the Bettendorf Axle Company. His first wife and children preceded him in death. He died as the company was rapidly expanding and before he moved into a palatial home he was building. The city of Bettendorf, Iowa is named after the two brothers.

== Biography ==
=== Early life and education ===
Born in Mendota, Illinois, William Bettendorf was the oldest of four children born to Michael and Catherine (Reck) Bettendorf. His father was born Michael Betteldorf in Nohn in the German Eifel region. He changed his surname to Bettendorf when he immigrated to the United States at age eighteen and became a school teacher. The family moved to Sedalia, Missouri where the elder Bettendorf opened a grocery store, and then to Fort Leavenworth in Kansas where he became a government clerk. William Bettendorf was educated in the public schools and St. Mary's Mission School in Kansas, which primarily educated Native American children.

=== Early career ===
He started working as a messenger boy in Humboldt, Kansas in 1870. Two years later he moved to Peru, Illinois where he became a clerk in the hardware store owned by A. L. Shepard. In 1874 he started work as a machinist's apprentice at the Peru Plow Company. It was during this time that he invented the first power lift sulky plow in 1878. The device allowed the farmer to remain seated on his horse-drawn plow and press a lever to raise the plow from the earth. Prior to his invention the farmer had to manually lift the plow blade at the end of each furrow. Most farm implement manufacturers adopted the plow. Bettendorf went on to work at the Moline Plow Company in Moline, Illinois for ten months before becoming the foreman in the fitting department of the Parlin & Orendorff Company in Canton, Illinois, which manufactured plows and other agricultural implements. In 1882 he left Canton and returned to Peru as a supervisor at the Peru Plow Company, where he had been an apprentice. It was here that he invented the Bettendorf metal wheel.

=== Later career ===
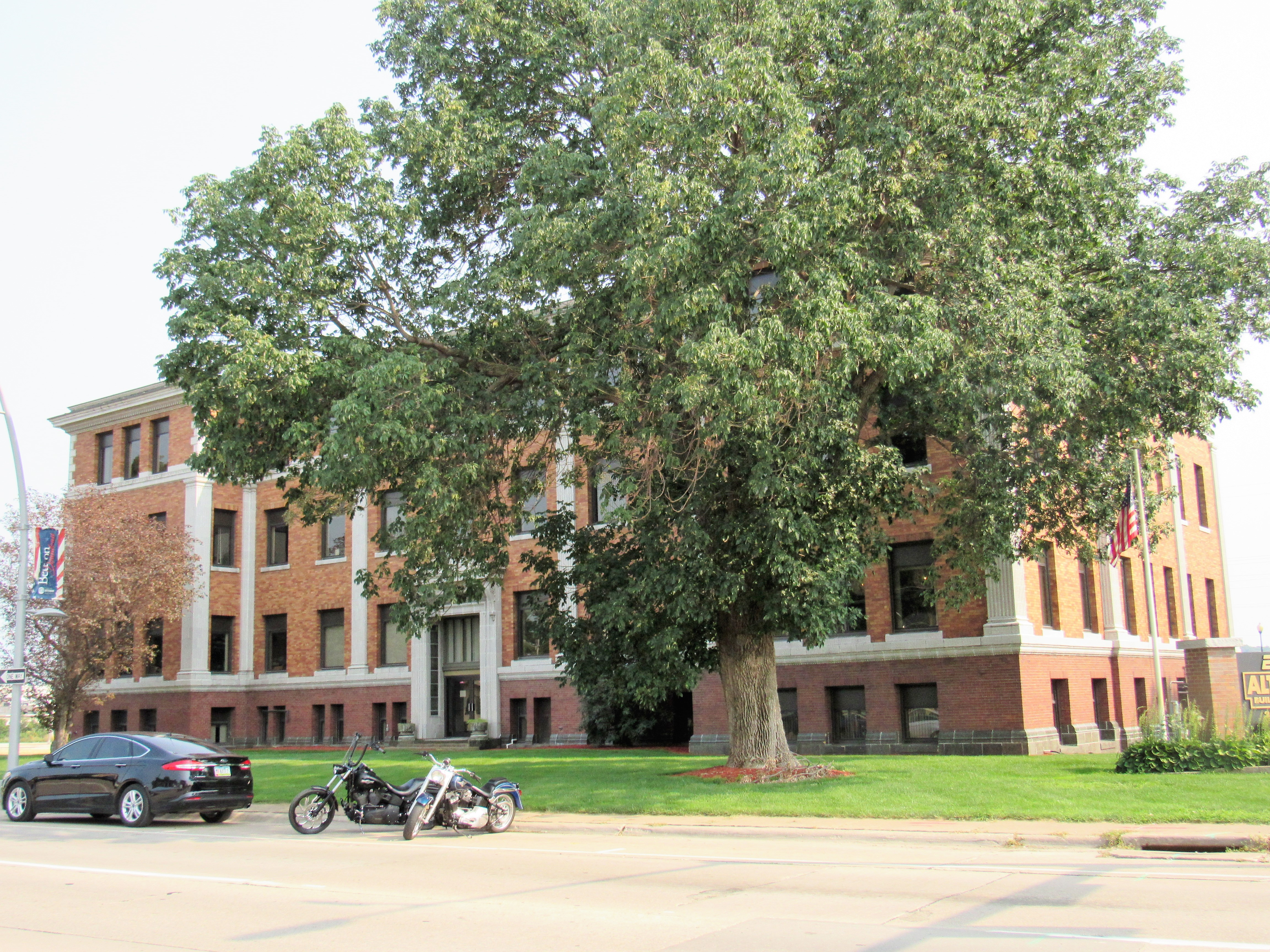
Bettendorf Company headquarters

Bettendorf established a shop to manufacture the wheel at Peru Plow and as the metal wheel branch of the business increased the name of the company was changed to Peru Plow & Wheel Company. Because the company was slow to increase capacity he moved his business to the Eagle Manufacturing Company of Davenport, Iowa after meeting with its president E. P. Lynch. With his brother, J.W. Bettendorf, he manufactured metal wheels at Eagle Manufacturing until 1889 when the brothers started the Bettendorf Metal Wheel Company in Davenport. In 1892 he developed a steel gear for farm wagons and the company manufactured those as well. He severed his ties with Bettendorf Metal Wheel and designed the machinery to manufacture the steel gears, which he eventually sold to International Harvester in 1905.

He organized the Bettendorf Axle Company with his brother J.W. The company was incorporated on January 1, 1895. W. P. Bettendorf was the company's first president and J. W. Bettendorf was the secretary. Two fires in 1902, one on January 28 and the other in May, destroyed the plant. The residents of the town of Gilbert, which was about three miles (4.8 km) east of Davenport at the time, raised $15,000 to buy the old Gilbert farm between the Mississippi River and the Davenport, Rock Island and North Western Railway tracks. The brothers decided to establish a new plant in Gilbert. A year later the citizens of the town elected to change its name to Bettendorf.

The factory was built on a 70-acre (28 ha) plot of land. The company originally was a manufacturer of agricultural implements. Its rapid growth was spurred by Bettendorf's design of a one-piece railroad truck frame that eliminated bolts. Bolts could loosen as the train moved and cause delays or derailments. The new frame was cast as a single piece of steel and revolutionized the railroad industry.

By 1909 the building had grown to three times its original size. It contained two regenerative open-hearth basic steel furnaces, with the capacity to heat 25 short tons (22 long tons; 23 t). They were able to produce about one hundred tons of finished steel castings daily. These were used to construct railroad boxcars. A complete railroad car was built from raw materials in the east end of the plant to the finished product on the west end. The company expanded in the early 20th century to manufacture oil burners, toys, water pumps, ice crushers and other products. The company also built the Meteor automobile. Between 1903 and 1910 the workforce grew from 300 to 800 employees.

=== Personal life ===
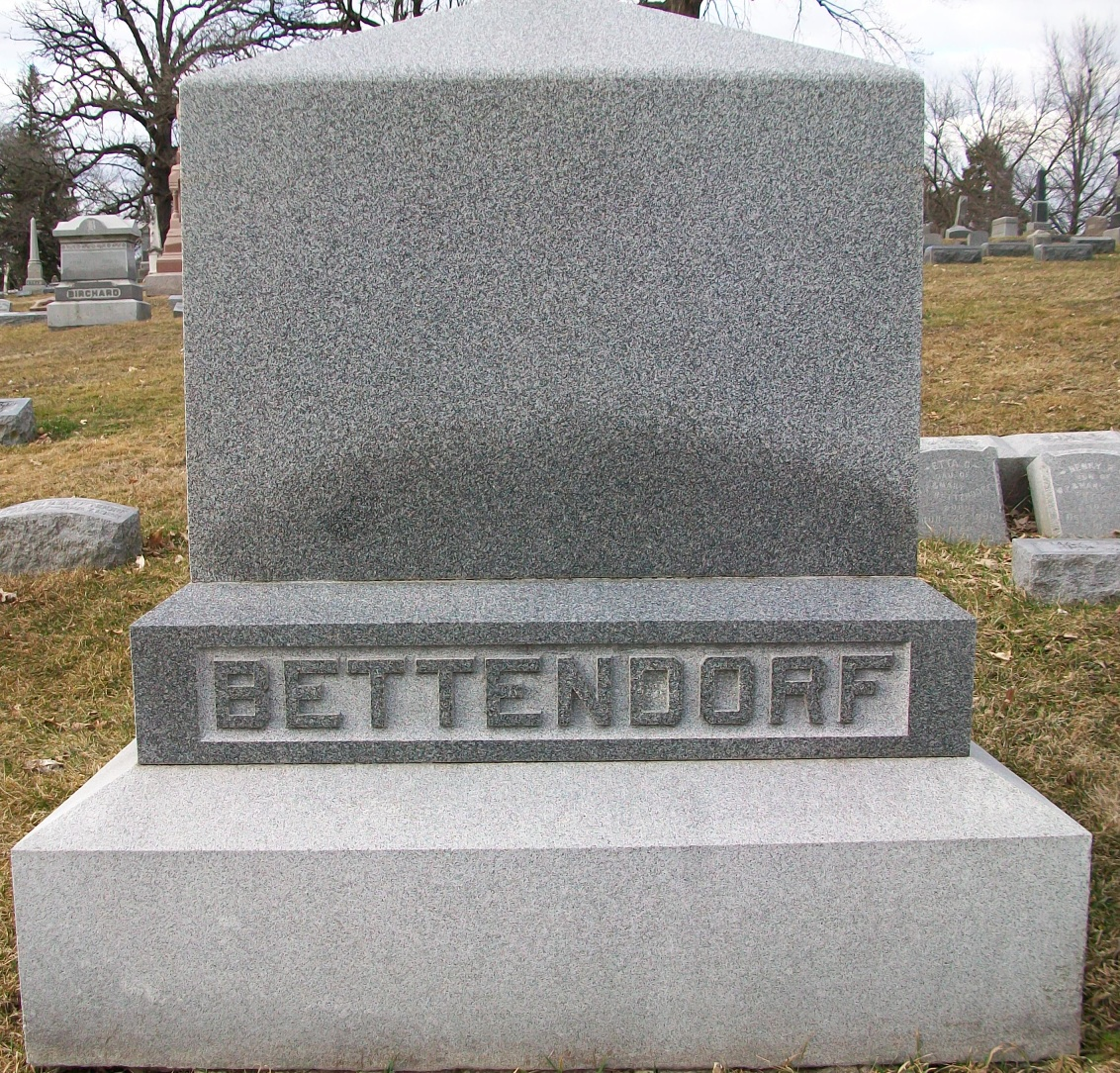
Grave in Oakdale Cemetery

William Bettendorf married Mary Wortman in 1879. Together they raised two children, Etta and Henry. She died in August 1901. In 1908 he married Elizabeth Staby, who was a widow.

He began building a 22-acre (8.9 ha) estate on a bluff overlooking Bettendorf and the river valley below. It was located in a grove of oak and maple trees. The house was built in the Spanish Revival style. The exterior featured large porches, a grand fountain and a carriage house that could hold six cars. The interior featured linen tapestries, oak stairways and hand carved oak woodwork, ceiling murals, and a fireplace in every room. Artisans were brought from Europe to complete the detail work. Entire trees were brought on site to be sawn for the paneling, so a room would have matched paneling. The estate was built for more than $150,000.

The family lived in a bungalow adjacent to their new residence during the construction. William Bettendorf had emergency surgery a week before they were scheduled to move into the house. He died on June 3, 1910, and was buried in Oakdale Cemetery in Davenport. His wife and stepson lived on the estate until 1926 when they sold it to the Grand Lodge of Iowa AF & AM. They added a 50-room wing which became the Iowa Masonic Nursing Home.
