= National Register of Historic Places listings in Scott County, Iowa =

This is intended to be a complete list of the properties and districts on the National Register of Historic Places in Scott County, Iowa, United States. Latitude and longitude coordinates are provided for many National Register properties and districts; these locations may be seen together in a map.

There are 288 properties and districts listed on the National Register in the county, including 1 National Historic Landmark. The city of Davenport is the location of 257 of these properties and districts; they are listed separately, while the remaining 32 properties and districts, including the National Historic Landmark, are listed here.

This National Park Service list is complete through NPS recent listings posted December 12, 2025.

== Current listings ==
=== Outside Davenport ===
	Name on the Register	Image	Date listed	Location	City or town	Description
1	Joseph F. Bettendorf House	Joseph F. Bettendorf House	January 27, 1983 (#83004212)	1821 Sunset Dr. 41°31′44″N 90°30′23″W	Bettendorf	Twenty-eight room house built by industrialist Joseph W. Bettendorf, one of two brothers for whom the city of Bettendorf is named. It now houses a private school.
2	Bettendorf–Washington School	Bettendorf–Washington School	July 12, 1984 (#84001317)	533 16th St. 41°31′41″N 90°30′35″W	Bettendorf	Former elementary school building that later housed a museum. It is now the site of private homes
3	James Brown House	James Brown House	March 5, 1982 (#82002643)	424 State St. 41°32′12″N 90°28′12″W	Riverdale	An 1842 Greek Revival style residence
4	Alexander Brownlie House	Alexander Brownlie House	December 22, 1976 (#76000809)	206 Pine St. 41°42′03″N 90°35′05″W	Long Grove	Farm house built in 1846.
5	Buffalo High School	Buffalo High School	August 22, 2005 (#05000901)	326 E. 4th St. 41°27′31″N 90°43′16″W	Buffalo	Former school building and community center.
6	Cody Homestead	Cody Homestead	January 24, 1974 (#74000812)	South of McCausland; 41°42′53″N 90°27′17″W	McCausland	Boyhood home of Buffalo Bill Cody, a government scout and Wild West show performer.
7	Cody Road Historic District	Cody Road Historic District	May 7, 1979 (#79000943)	Irregular pattern along Cody Rd. 41°36′10″N 90°20′38″W	Le Claire	Cody Road is the main street through Le Claire. It includes the Central Business District.
8	Community Building	Community Building	April 25, 2008 (#08000331)	428 S. River Dr. 41°40′26″N 90°20′26″W	Princeton	A former commercial building that now houses the Boll's Community Center.
9	Dawley House	Dawley House	April 13, 1979 (#79003699)	127 S. 2nd St. 41°35′48″N 90°20′41″W	Le Claire	An 1851 vernacular Italianate style house that is part of the Houses of Mississippi River Men Thematic Resource.
10	East Hill House and Carriage House	East Hill House and Carriage House	November 22, 1999 (#99001384)	5004 State St. 41°32′35″N 90°27′42″W	Riverdale	A 1926 Colonial Revival style residence.
11	Forest Grove School No. 5	Forest Grove School No. 5	October 16, 2013 (#13000831)	24040 195th St. 41°35′22″N 90°26′03″W	Bettendorf vicinity	Former one-room school house near Bettendorf, which was built in 1873.
12	James Gamble House	James Gamble House	March 30, 1979 (#79003692)	527 Wisconsin Ave. 41°35′52″N 90°20′57″W	Le Claire	An 1855 Italianate style residence.
13	Horton–Suiter House	Horton–Suiter House	April 13, 1979 (#79003700)	102 N. 2nd St. 41°35′52″N 90°20′43″W	Le Claire	A house from 1860 that is part of the Houses of Mississippi River Men Thematic Resource.
14	Kattenbracher House	Kattenbracher House	April 13, 1979 (#79003701)	1125 N. 2nd St. 41°36′36″N 90°20′43″W	Le Claire	A house from 1860 that is part of the Houses of Mississippi River Men Thematic Resource.
15	Lock and Dam No. 14 Historic District	Lock and Dam No. 14 Historic District	March 10, 2004 (#04000174)	25549 182nd St. 41°34′28″N 90°24′05″W	Pleasant Valley Township	Historic District that includes one building, six structures, and two objects.
16	LONESTAR	LONESTAR	December 20, 1989 (#89002461)	Buffalo Bill Museum; 41°35′54″N 90°20′33″W	Le Claire	An 1868 wooden, paddlewheel, steam-powered, towboat that is a part of the Buffalo Bill Museum.
17	McCaffrey House	McCaffrey House	April 13, 1979 (#79003702)	208 N. Cody Rd. 41°35′56″N 90°20′38″W	Le Claire	An 1870 vernacular Italianate style house that is part of the Houses of Mississippi River Men Thematic Resource.
18	Nebergall "Knoll Crest" Round Barn	Nebergall "Knoll Crest" Round Barn	June 30, 1986 (#86001473)	Telegraph Rd. 41°30′59″N 90°42′54″W	Blue Grass	A round barn that was built by Benton Steele in 1914.
19	Old Mill House	Old Mill House	April 13, 1979 (#79003703)	419 N. Cody Rd. 41°36′06″N 90°20′36″W	Le Claire	An 1851 Greek Revival style residence that is part of the Houses of Mississippi River Men Thematic Resource.
20	Rambo House	Rambo House	April 13, 1979 (#79003704)	430 N. Cody Rd. 41°36′06″N 90°20′38″W	Le Claire	An 1855 Italianate style house that is part of the Houses of Mississippi River Men Thematic Resource.
21	Regina Coeli Monastery	Regina Coeli Monastery	January 28, 1994 (#93001590)	1401 Central Ave. 41°31′51″N 90°30′45″W	Bettendorf	A former monastery that was built for Discalced Carmelite nuns. The Romanesque Revival style building became a hotel and now houses an addictions rehabilitation facility.
22	John Smith House	John Smith House	April 13, 1979 (#79003705)	426 Dodge St. 41°35′47″N 90°20′55″W	Le Claire	A house built in 1852 that is part of the Houses of Mississippi River Men Thematic Resource.
23	Roswell Spencer House	Roswell Spencer House	April 22, 1982 (#82002642)	Off U.S. Route 67; 41°34′11″N 90°25′24″W	Pleasant Valley Township	House built in 1850.
24	Stone House	Stone House	July 7, 1983 (#83002528)	817 N. 2nd St. 41°36′23″N 90°20′43″W	Le Claire	
25	Stone School	Stone School	December 27, 1977 (#77000558)	West of Le Claire; 41°36′43″N 90°23′56″W	Le Claire	A one-room school house built of stone along the Territorial Road in rural Scott County. It has subsequently been dismantled.
26	Jacob Suiter House	Jacob Suiter House	April 13, 1979 (#79003707)	214 S. 2nd St. 41°35′46″N 90°20′43″W	Le Claire	A vernacular Italianate style house built in 1860 that is part of the Houses of Mississippi River Men Thematic Resource.
27	John H. Suiter House	John H. Suiter House	April 13, 1979 (#79003706)	1220 N. 2nd St. 41°36′39″N 90°20′45″W	Le Claire	A house built in 1855 that is part of the Houses of Mississippi River Men Thematic Resource.
28	William Suiter House	William Suiter House	April 13, 1979 (#79003708)	227 Wisconsin; 41°35′52″N 90°20′46″W	Le Claire	A house built in 1855 that is part of the Houses of Mississippi River Men Thematic Resource.
29	George Tromley Jr. House	George Tromley Jr. House	April 13, 1979 (#79003710)	127 Jones St. 41°35′56″N 90°20′41″W	Le Claire	A house built in 1865 that is part of the Houses of Mississippi River Men Thematic Resource.
30	George Tromley Sr. House	George Tromley Sr. House	April 13, 1979 (#79003709)	806 N. Cody Rd. 41°36′22″N 90°20′40″W	Le Claire	A house built in 1850 that is part of the Houses of Mississippi River Men Thematic Resource.
31	Samuel Van Sant House	Samuel Van Sant House	April 13, 1979 (#79003711)	322 N. Cody Rd. 41°36′01″N 90°20′38″W	Le Claire	A house built in 1860 that is part of the Houses of Mississippi River Men Thematic Resource.

== Former listings ==
	Name on the Register	Image	Date listed	Date removed	Location	Description
1	Eldridge Turn-Halle	Eldridge Turn-Halle	February 5, 1987 (#87000032)	March 7, 2019	102 W. LeClaire St. 41°39′18″N 90°35′00″W	A former Turnverein, it became a commercial building and was destroyed in a fire in 2013.

== See also ==
- List of National Historic Landmarks in Iowa
- National Register of Historic Places listings in Iowa
- Listings in neighboring counties: Cedar, Clinton, Muscatine, Rock Island (IL)
