= Tromley =

Tromley may refer to:

- George Tromley Jr. House, Le Claire, Iowa, United States
- George Tromley Sr. House, Le Claire, Iowa, United States
