= Stone School =

Stone School may refer to:

- Stone School (LeClaire, Iowa), listed on the National Register of Historic Places in Scott County, Iowa
- Stone School (Ann Arbor, Michigan), listed on the National Register of Historic Places in Washtenaw County, Michigan
- Stone School (Newmarket, New Hampshire), listed on the National Register of Historic Places in Rockingham County, New Hampshire
