= Barrows House =

Barrows House may refer to:

- Edward S. Barrows House, Davenport, Iowa, listed on the National Register of Historic Places in Scott County, Iowa
- Barrows-Steadman Homestead, Fryeburg, Maine, listed on the National Register of Historic Places in Oxford, Maine

== See also ==
- Barrow House (disambiguation)
