= Houses of Mississippi River Men Thematic Resource =

- Houses of Mississippi River Men TR
- U.S. National Register of Historic Places
- Location within Iowa Location within the United States
- Location: LeClaire, Iowa
- Coordinates: 41°35′46″N 90°21′23″W
- Built: 1850–1870
- Architectural style: Italianate; Greek Revival
- MPS: Houses of Mississippi River Men TR
- NRHP reference No.: 64000151
- Added to NRHP: April 13, 1979

The Houses of Mississippi River Men Thematic Resource (TR) is a multiple property submission to the National Register of Historic Places which was approved on April 13, 1979. The structures are all located in the town of LeClaire in Scott County, Iowa, United States.

== Structures ==
The submission includes thirteen architecturally and historically significant structures. The houses included, in order from their NRHP reference number, are:

Resource Name	Image	Address	Built	City	Note
Dawley House		127 S. 2nd St.	1851	LeClaire	Italianate style home
Horton–Suiter House		102 S. 2nd St.	1860	LeClaire	Italianate style home
Kattenbracher House		1125 S. 2nd St.	1860	LeClare	
McCaffrey House		208 N. Cody Rd	1870	LeClaire	Italianate style home
Old Mill House		419 N. Cody Rd.	1851	LeClaire	Greek Revival style home
Rambo House		430 N. Cody Rd.	1855	LeClaire	Italianate style home
John Smith House		426 Dodge	1852	LeClaire	
John H. Suiter House		1220 N. 2nd St.	1855	LeClaire	
Jacob Suiter House		2214 S. 2nd St.	1860	LeClaire	Italianate style home
William Suiter House		227 Wisconsin	1855	LeClaire	
George Tromley Sr. House		806 N. Cody Rd.	1850	LeClaire	
George Tromley Jr. House		127 Jones St.	1865	LeClaire	
Samuel Van Sant House		322 N. Cody Rd.	1860	LeClaire	
