= Jacob Suiter House =

Historic house in Iowa, United States

- U.S. National Register of Historic Places
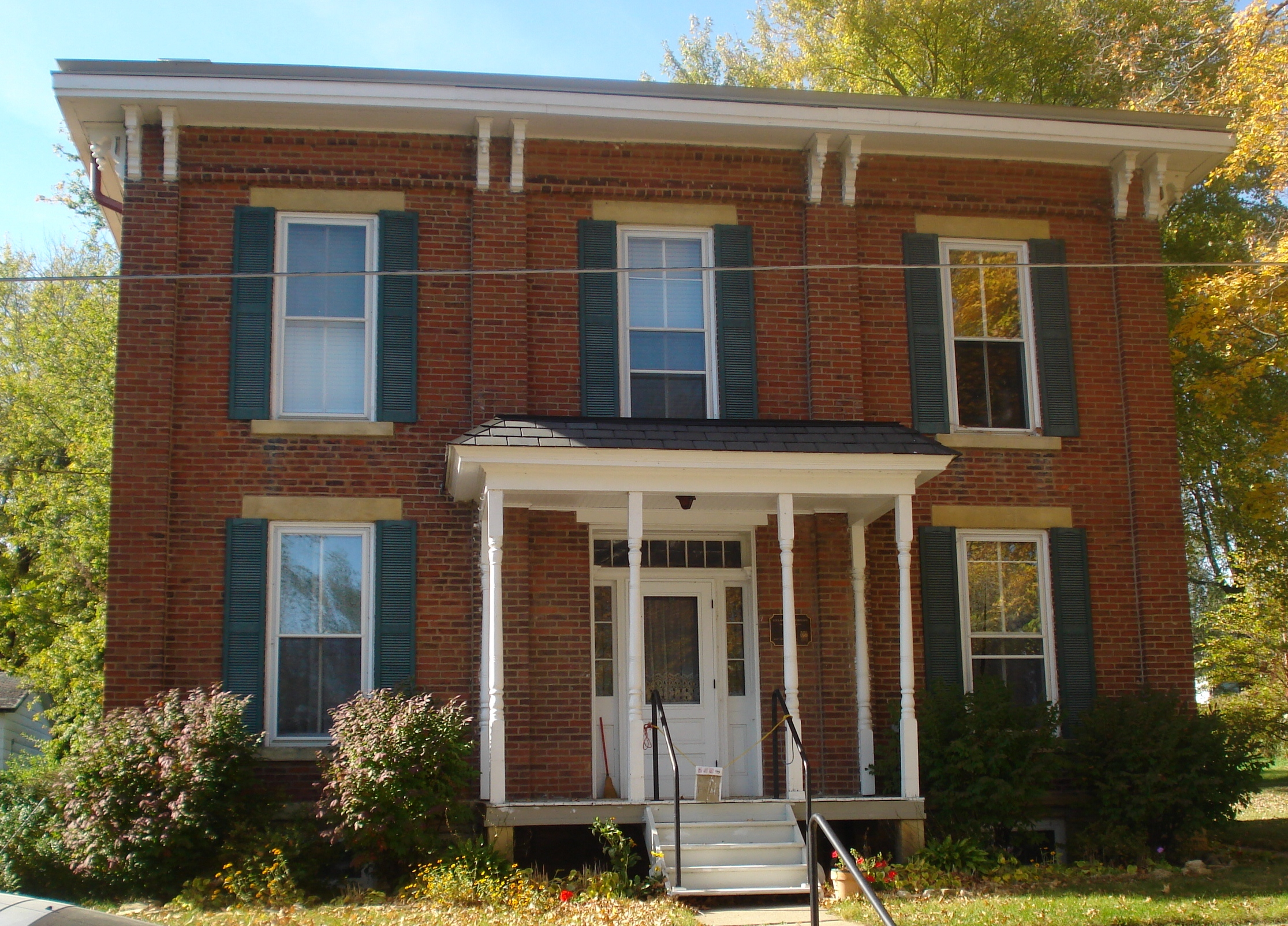

- Location within Iowa Location within the United States
- Location: 214 S. 2nd St. Le Claire, Iowa
- Coordinates: 41°35′45.87″N 90°20′42.69″W
- Area: less than one acre
- Built: 1860
- Architectural style: Italianate
- MPS: Houses of Mississippi River Men TR
- NRHP reference No.: 79003707
- Added to NRHP: April 13, 1979

The Jacob Suiter House is a historic building located in Le Claire, Iowa, United States, and has been listed on the National Register of Historic Places since 1979. The property is part of the Houses of Mississippi River Men Thematic Resource, which covers the homes of men from LeClaire who worked on the Mississippi River as riverboat captains, pilots, builders and owners. Jacob Suiter was one of three generations of his family to make his living on the river.

== Jacob Suiter ==
Jacob Suiter (1828–1904) was of the second generation of Suiters to work the Upper Rapids as a river pilot. During the 1870s he would have charged $10 a trip.

== Architecture ==
The Jacob Suiter House is a two-story, three bay structure built on a limestone foundation. It is constructed of bricks that were manufactured locally, and the structure features clean proportions and simple lines. The residence is a variation on the vernacular Italianate style. The main entrance is located in the central bay and it is covered by a small wooden porch that is supported by slender turned posts. It features a bracketed cornice and corner pilasters. The house is capped with a low hipped roof. Built onto the back of the house is a single story addition with a gable roof that served as a kitchen. Beyond that is a smaller frame addition. It is essentially a smaller and simpler version of the Dawley House in Le Claire.
