= William Suiter House =

Historic house in Iowa, United States

- U.S. National Register of Historic Places
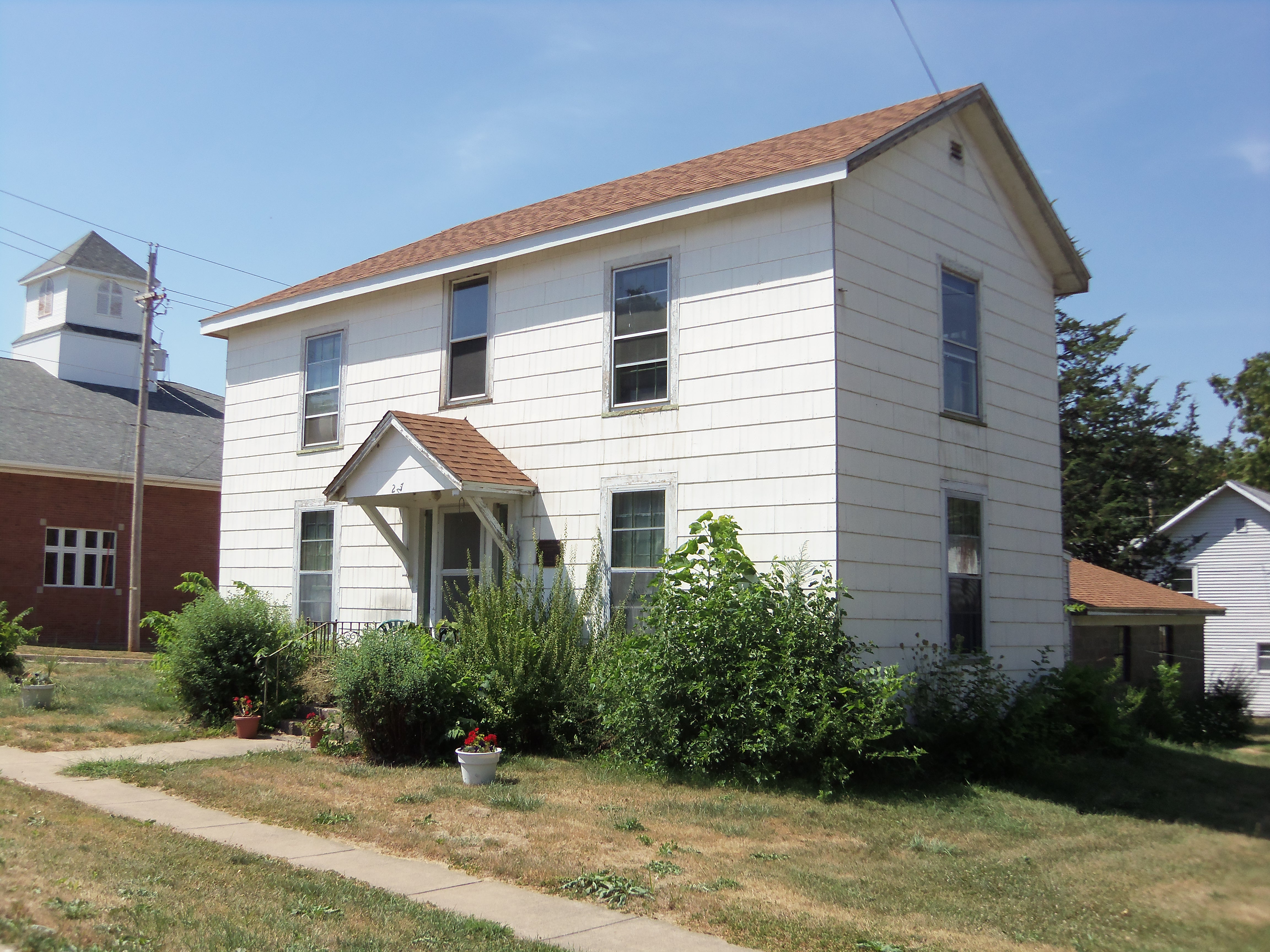

- Location within Iowa Location within the United States
- Location: 227 Wisconsin; Le Claire, Iowa
- Coordinates: 41°35′52.2738″N 90°20′45.8082″W
- Area: less than one acre
- Built: 1855
- MPS: Houses of Mississippi River Men TR
- NRHP reference No.: 79003708
- Added to NRHP: April 13, 1979

The William Suiter House is an historic building located in Le Claire, Iowa, United States. The house was built in 1855 and it has been listed on the National Register of Historic Places since 1979. The property is part of the Houses of Mississippi River Men Thematic Resource, which covers the homes of men from LeClaire who worked on the Mississippi River as riverboat captains, pilots, builders and owners.

== William Suiter ==
William Suiter was one of three generations of his family to make his living on the river. Born in 1826, he was one of the sons of Phillip Suiter, who was one of Le Claire's original settlers and river pilots. William began his river career as a raft hand. He became a river pilot by the time he was 21 and worked in the profession for close to 40 years. His three sons, Mordecai, William and Charles, all went to work for the railroad, which replaced the steamboat as a primary form of transportation in the region.

== Architecture ==
The William Suiter House is a simple two-story, three-bay, frame structure with a shallow gable roof. It follows a traditional center-hall plan and single pile arrangement. The main entrance is located in the center bay and is flanked by sidelights and sheltered by a small gable roof. The windows are 6 over 6 sash in flat, plain surrounds. The frame and concrete-block additions built onto the rear of the house are more recent.
