= Barrow House =

Barrow House may refer to:

- Dr. William Barrow Mansion, Jersey City, New Jersey, listed on the NRHP in New Jersey
- Brand-Barrow House, Lexington, Kentucky, listed on the National Register of Historic Places in Fayette County, Kentucky
- Barrow House, Cumbria, England, A late 18th century mansion in Cumbria, also known as Derwentwater Youth Hostel.

== See also ==
- Barrows House (disambiguation)
