= Buffalo Bill Museum =

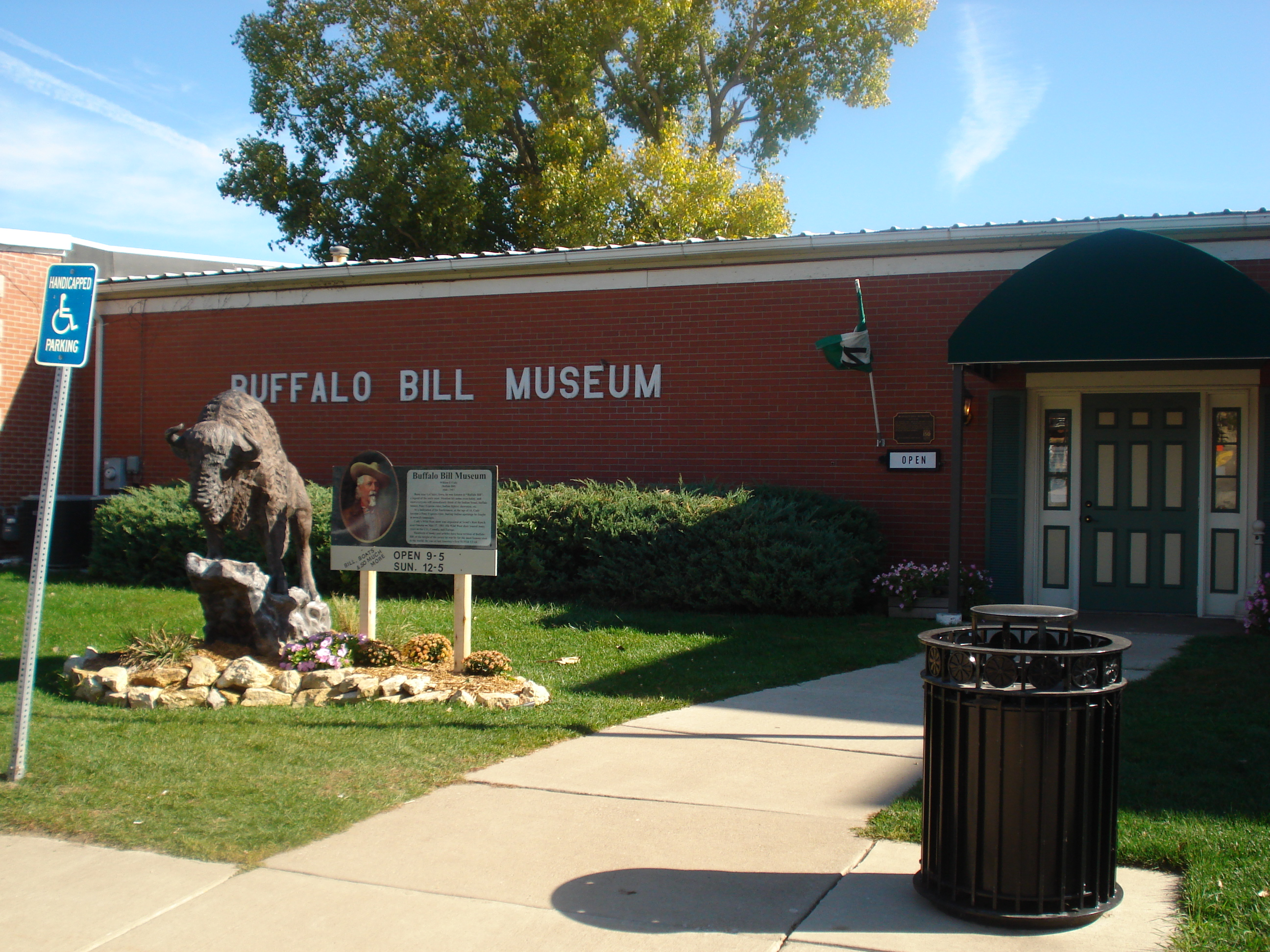
- Established: 1957
- Location: Le Claire, Iowa
- Director: Robert Schiffke
- President: Debbie Smith
- Website: buffalobillmuseumleclaire.com

The Buffalo Bill Museum, located in LeClaire, Iowa, is focused on life along the Mississippi River and local history.

One exhibit is the Lone Star, a wooden, paddlewheel steam-powered towboat that is housed in a special pier. Local history exhibits include the story of famous people from LeClaire, including American West showman Buffalo Bill Cody, engineer James Buchanan Eads and inventor James Ryan.

Professor James J. “Crash” Ryan (1903-1973), a professor of mechanical engineering at the University of Minnesota was the inventor of the “Flight Recorder” invented in 1953; see U.S. Patent 2,959,459. The aviation recorder was initially named the “General Mills Flight Recorder” and later the "Ryan Flight Data Recorder". In December 1959, Professor Ryan filed a second patent application for a “Coding Apparatus for Flight Recorders and the Like” approved as U.S. Patent 3,075,192 on January 22, 1963. An early prototype of the Ryan Flight Data Recorder is on display at the museum as described in the January 2013 Aviation History Magazine article "Father of the Black Box" by Scott M. Fisher.

Other exhibits include the Sauk and Fox Tribe, riverboat pilots, area pioneers, as well as area history and culture.
