= Horton–Suiter House =

Historic house in Iowa, United States

- U.S. National Register of Historic Places
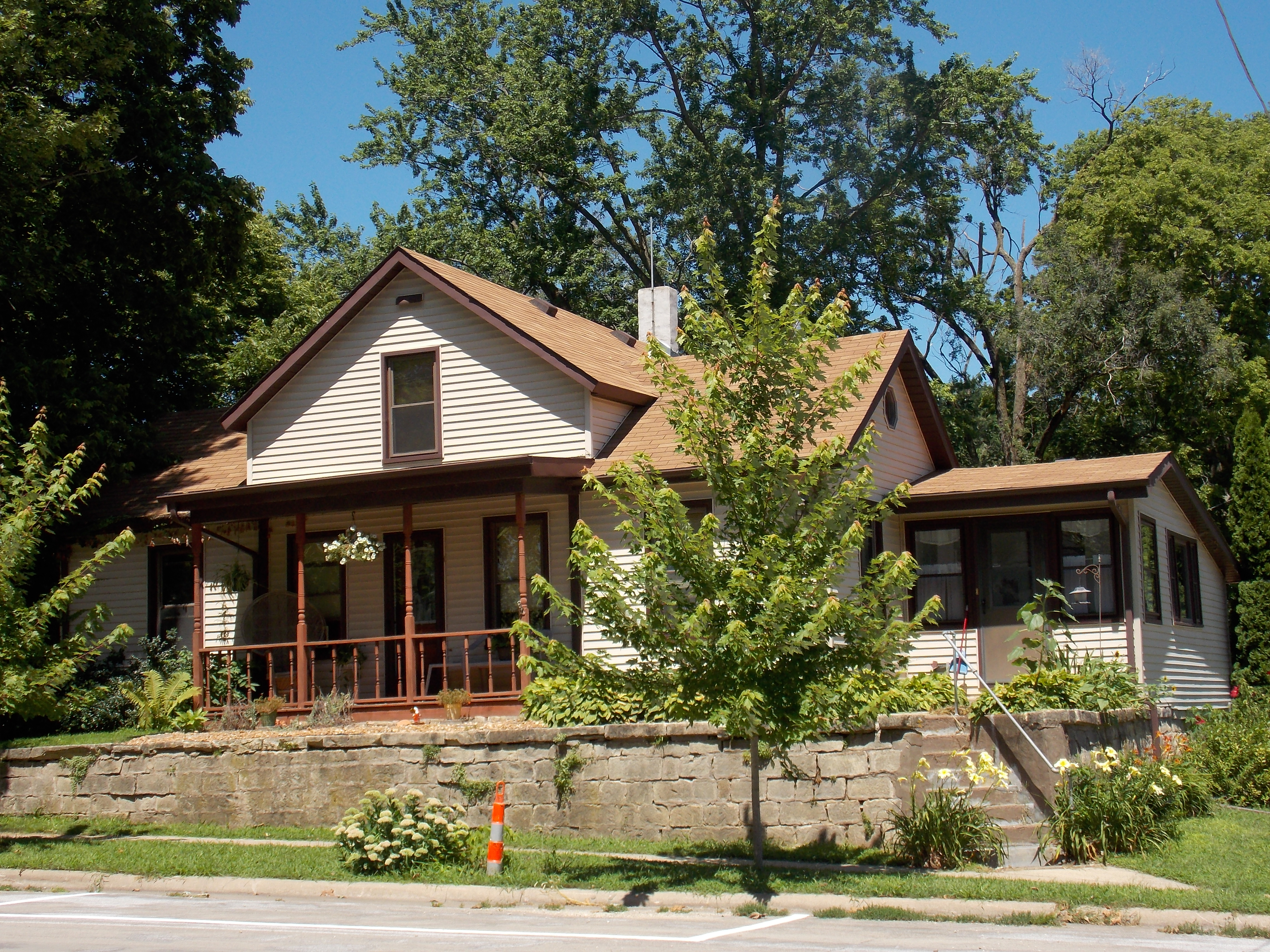

- Location within Iowa Location within the United States
- Location: 102 N. 2nd St. Le Claire, Iowa
- Coordinates: 41°35′51.89″N 90°20′42.62″W
- Area: less than one acre
- Built: 1860
- Architectural style: Italianate
- MPS: Houses of Mississippi River Men TR
- NRHP reference No.: 79003700
- Added to NRHP: April 13, 1979

The Horton–Suiter House is a historic building located in Le Claire, Iowa, United States. The residence has been listed on the National Register of Historic Places since 1979. The property is part of the Houses of Mississippi River Men Thematic Resource, which covers the homes of men from LeClaire who worked on the Mississippi River as riverboat captains, pilots, builders and owners.

== History ==
The house was possibly built in 1860 for Henry Horton, who was an engineer on raft steamers. James Suiter lived here after Horton. He was one of the last river pilots who worked the Le Claire Rapids. He worked as a mortician to supplement his income during the winter months when the river was frozen.

== Architecture ==
The Horton–Suiter House is a 1½-story frame "cottage". It is five bays across the front, with the main entrance in the center. The house is capped by a low-pitched gable roof with a ridge that parallels the front facade. The entrance is covered by a small porch, which is supported by slender turned posts. A large, triangular, roof dormer is centered above the entrance. A single-story section with a slanted roof was added to the northeast corner of the structure. The house is set on a raised lot that is surrounded by a stone retaining wall.
