= Old Mill House =

Historic house in Iowa, United States

- U.S. National Register of Historic Places
- U.S. Historic district – Contributing property
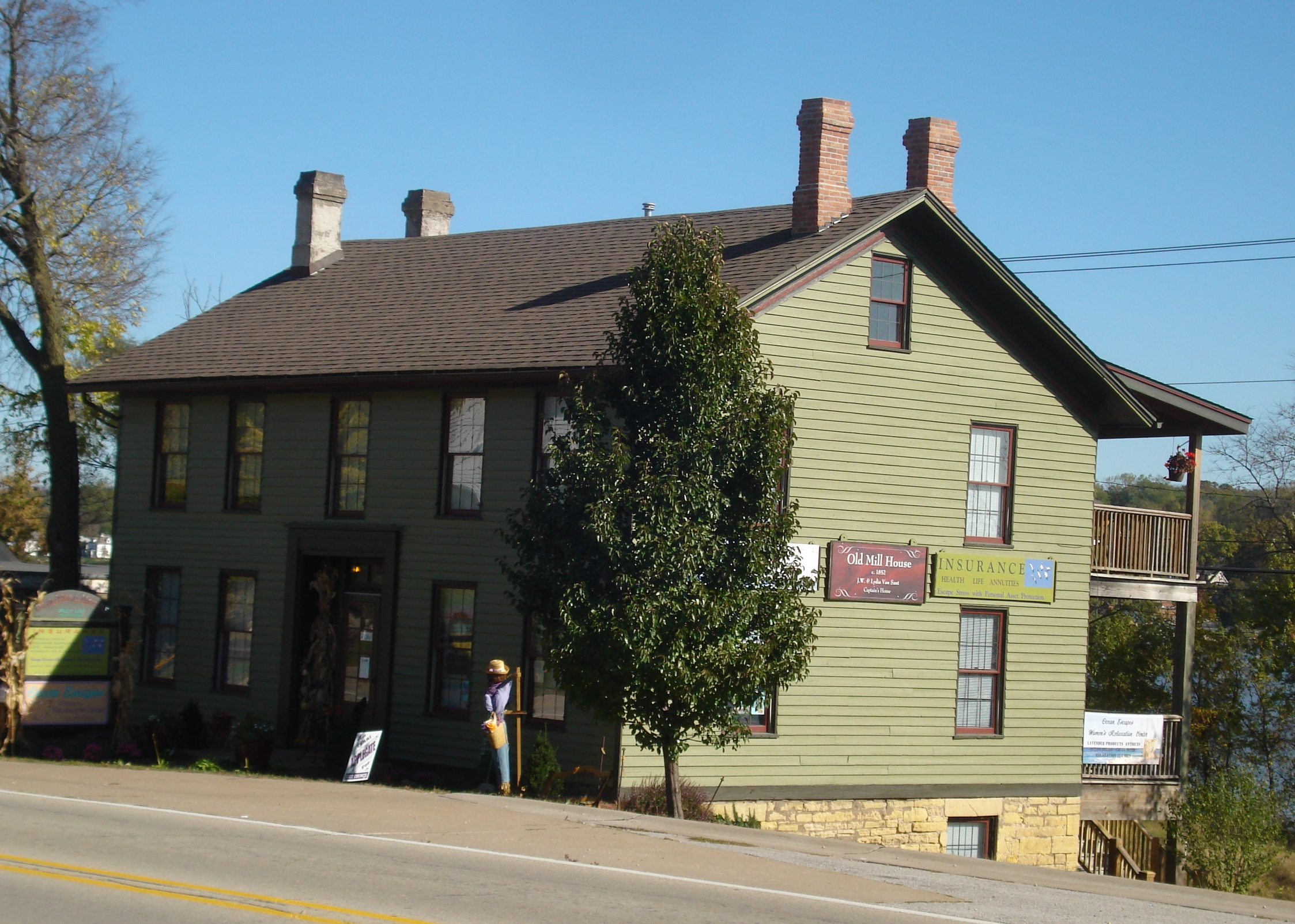

- Location within Iowa Location within the United States
- Location: 419 N. Cody Rd. Le Claire, Iowa
- Coordinates: 41°35′6″N 90°20′36″W
- Area: less than one acre
- Built: 1851
- Architectural style: Greek Revival
- Part of: Cody Road Historic District (ID79000943)
- MPS: Houses of Mississippi River Men TR
- NRHP reference No.: 79003703
- Added to NRHP: April 13, 1979

The Old Mill House is an historic property located in Le Claire, Iowa, United States. The Greek Revival style residence has been listed on the National Register of Historic Places since 1979. The property is part of the Houses of Mississippi River Men Thematic Resource, which covers the homes of men from LeClaire who worked on the Mississippi River as riverboat captains, pilots, builders and owners. It is also a contributing property in the Cody Road Historic District.

== History ==
Alfred Jansen built this house in 1851. It, and the adjoining boatyards, were acquired by J.W. Van Sant about 1865. Van Sant began his river career as a ship carpenter and boat builder in Rock Island, Illinois in the 1840s. He moved to Le Claire in 1862 to take over the boatyards established by the Davenport and Rogers Co. The yards took up about two blocks along the river and employed about 100 men who built and repaired boats. Van Sant's son Sam found success with his raftboat, the J.W. Van Sant, so the yards produced a number of them, including the D.A. McDonald, the Le Claire Belle and the Silver Wave. Several of the boats were owned and operated by the Van Sant's through the Van Sant-Musser Navigation Co.

== Architecture ==
The Old Mill House is a two-story, five-bay clapboard structure built on a stone foundation. It is a fine example of the Greek Revival style. It features a symmetrical facade, a handsome door frame on the main entrance, and a gable roof with a pair of chimneys near the ridge of the roof. The main entrance is located in the center bay. It has a wide door enframement flanked by sidelights and a transom. Because the house is built on a sloping lot the basement on the river side of the house is exposed.
