= Samuel Van Sant House =

Historic house in Iowa, United States

- U.S. National Register of Historic Places
- U.S. Historic district – Contributing property
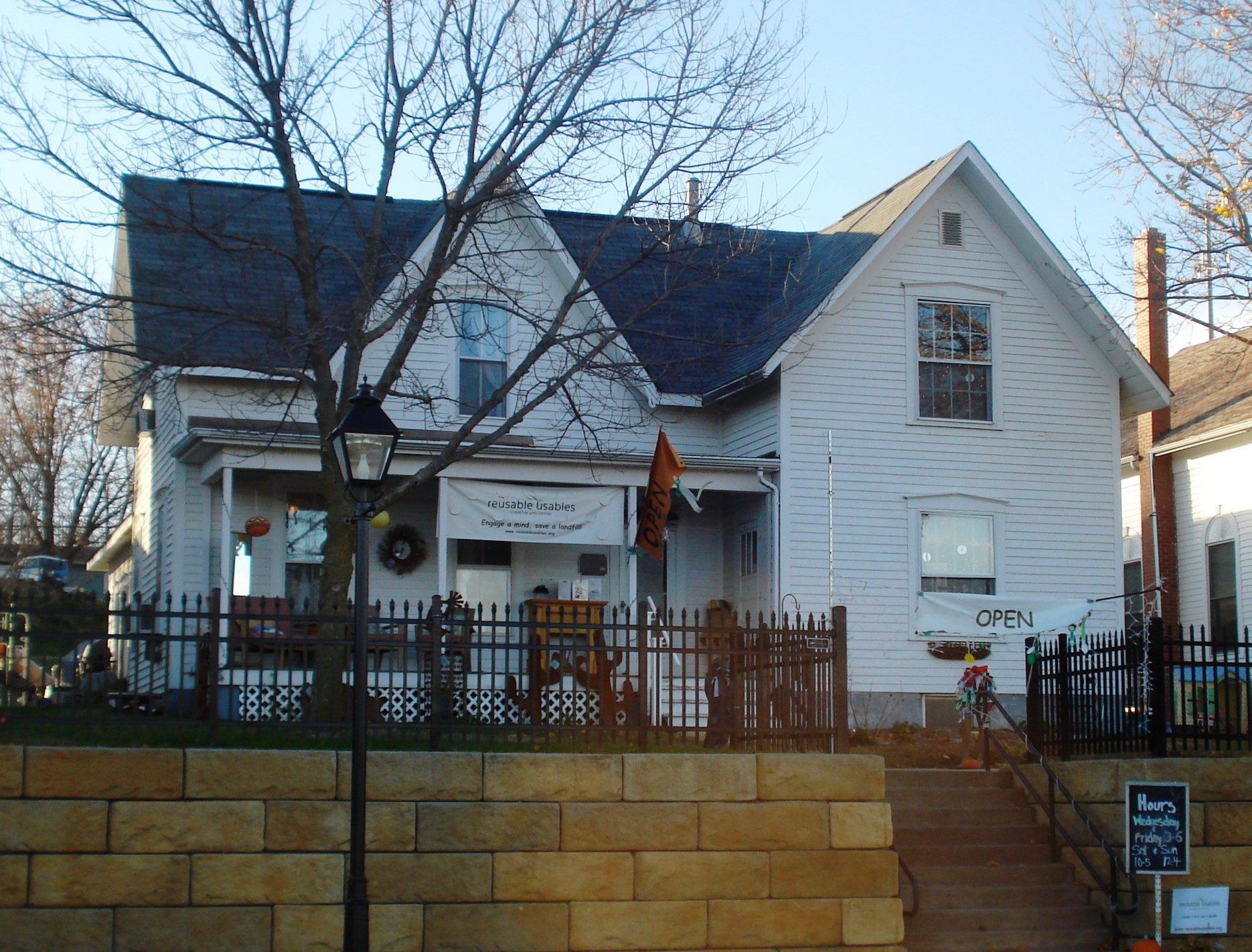

- Location within Iowa Location within the United States
- Location: 322 N. Cody Rd. Le Claire, Iowa
- Coordinates: 41°36′0″N 90°20′37″W
- Built: 1860
- Part of: Cody Road Historic District (ID79000943)
- MPS: Houses of Mississippi River Men TR
- NRHP reference No.: 79003711
- Added to NRHP: April 13, 1979

The Samuel Van Sant House is an historic building located in Le Claire, Iowa, United States. The house was built in 1860 and it has been listed on the National Register of Historic Places since 1979. The property is part of the Houses of Mississippi River Men Thematic Resource, which covers the homes of men from LeClaire who worked on the Mississippi River as riverboat captains, pilots, builders and owners. It is also a contributing property in the Cody Road Historic District.

== Samuel Van Sant ==
Samuel was the son of J.W. Van Sant who was the head of the Le Claire Marine Railway boatyards. Along with John Smith, also of Le Claire, he developed the raftboat named the J.W. Van Sant after his father. It pushed the lumber rafts down the river from the forests in the north to the mills further south. Their invention revolutionized the transportation of logs and lumber down the Mississippi River. They also developed the bowboat, which was a small sternwheeler set crosswise at the front of the raft to provide additional control over direction of movement. Van Sant moved to Minnesota in the 1880s where he was elected to the Minnesota House of Representatives and served as Speaker of the House. He later became the state's governor.

== Architecture ==
The Samuel Van Sant House is a 1½-story frame house whose exterior is composed of narrow clapboards. It follows an L-shape plan. The house features a wide front gable and the main roofline that parallel the street. There is also a large triangular wall dormer that is centered on the front of the long arm of the "L". The house's windows have flat enframements with shallow triangular pediments. A plain, wooden porch is located in the angle of the "L" and is a later addition.
