= John H. Suiter House =

Historic house in Iowa, United States

- U.S. National Register of Historic Places
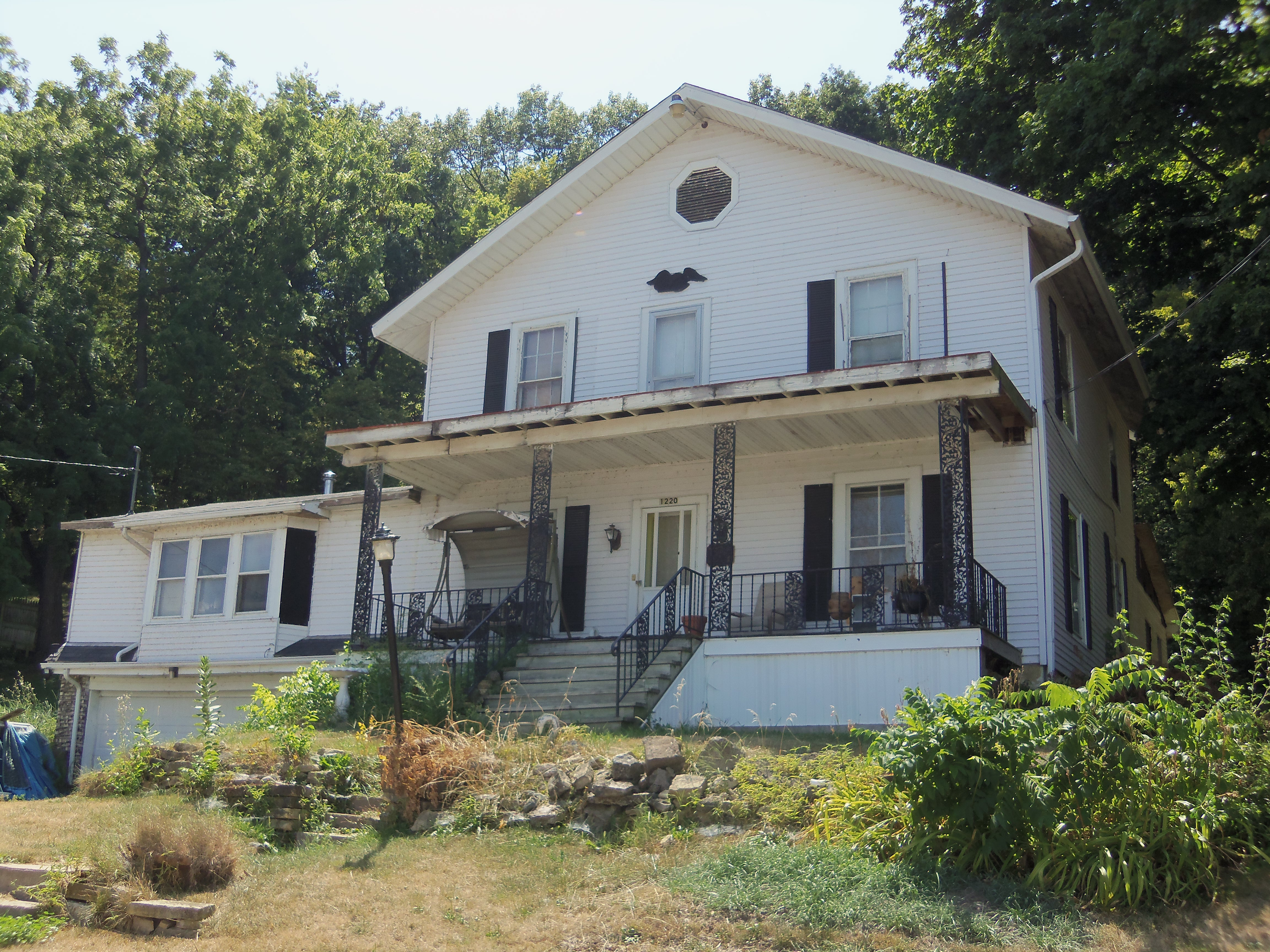

- Location within Iowa Location within the United States
- Location: 1220 N. 2nd St. Le Claire, Iowa
- Coordinates: 41°36′39.0018″N 90°20′44.7684″W
- Area: approximately 1 acre (0.40 ha)
- Built: 1855
- MPS: Houses of Mississippi River Men TR
- NRHP reference No.: 79003706
- Added to NRHP: April 13, 1979

The John H. Suiter House is a historic building located in Le Claire, Iowa, United States. The house was built in 1855 and it has been listed on the National Register of Historic Places since 1979. The property is part of the Houses of Mississippi River Men Thematic Resource, which covers the homes of men from LeClaire who worked on the Mississippi River as riverboat captains, pilots, builders and owners.

== John H. Suiter ==
John H. Suiter was part of the second of three generations of his family to make his living on the river. Born in 1822, he was the son of Phillip Suiter. John moved with his parents to Le Claire in 1835. He worked as a river pilot from 1843 until 1875, and then managed his extensive agricultural and real estate holdings. He became locally famous in 1864 when he was the only Le Claire pilot willing to take a raft through the rapids during a period of extremely low water on the Mississippi.

== Architecture ==
The John H. Suiter House is a two-story, three-bay, frame structure built on a stone foundation. The house sits high on its foundation because the lot slopes downward from the back of the house on the west to the front of the house on the east. The main entrance is located in the center bay and the original wooden porch structure has been replaced with wrought iron. The windows are set in flat surrounds that feature narrow cornices. The house is capped with a shallow gable roof.
