= Cody Road Historic District =

Historic district in Iowa, United States

- U.S. National Register of Historic Places
- U.S. Historic district
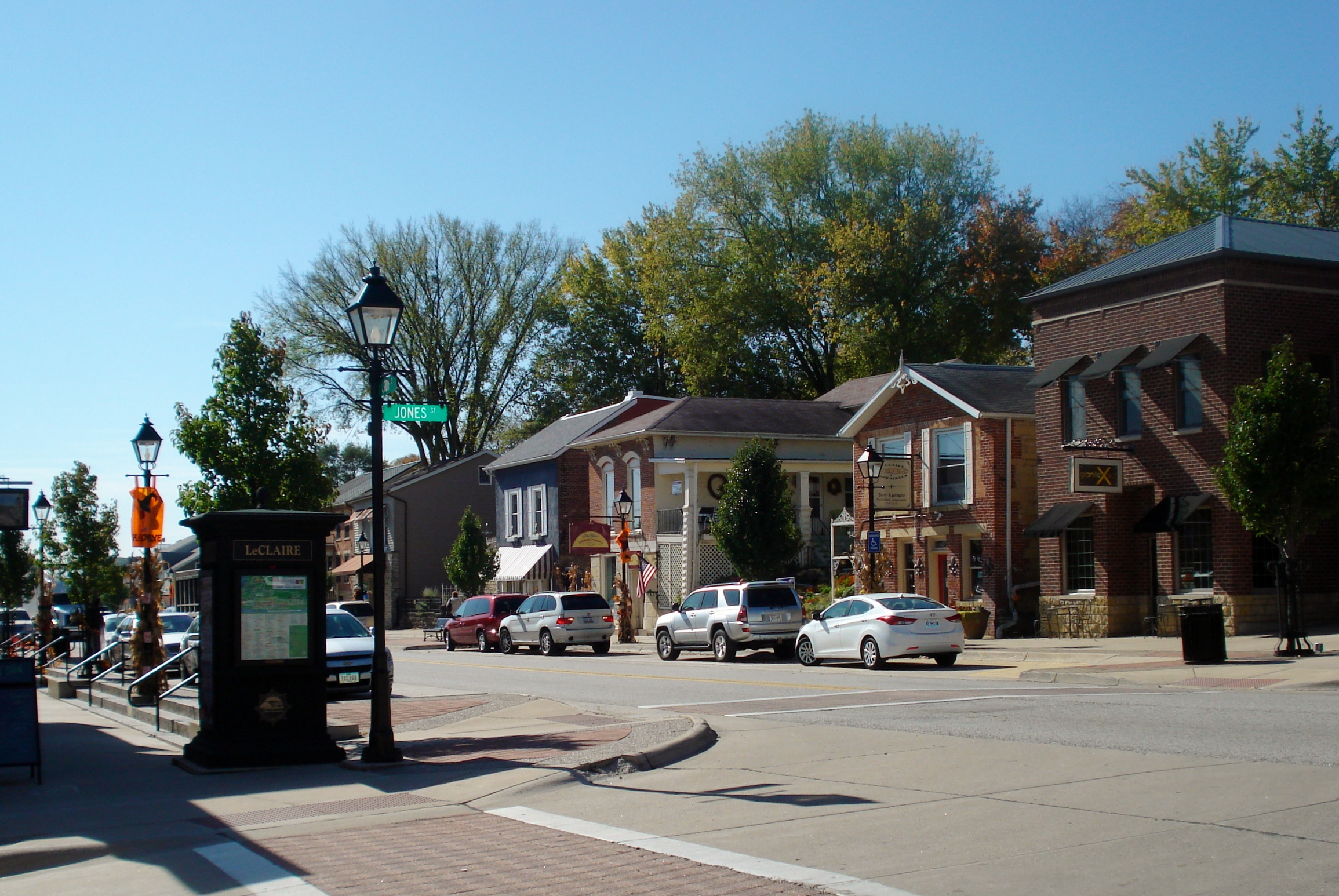

- Location within Iowa Location within the United States
- Location: Irregular pattern along Cody Road, Le Claire, Iowa
- Coordinates: 41°36′10″N 90°20′38″W
- Area: 20 acres (8.1 ha)
- Built: 1850-1900
- Architectural style: Italianate
- NRHP reference No.: 79000943
- Added to NRHP: May 7, 1979

Cody Road Historic District is a nationally recognized historic district located in Le Claire, Iowa, United States. It includes 60 buildings along a nine-block stretch of U.S. Route 67, Cody Road, the primary street through the town. The district contains Le Claire's main commercial district on the south side of the district and residential area on the north. The district has been listed on the National Register of Historic Places since 1979.

== History ==
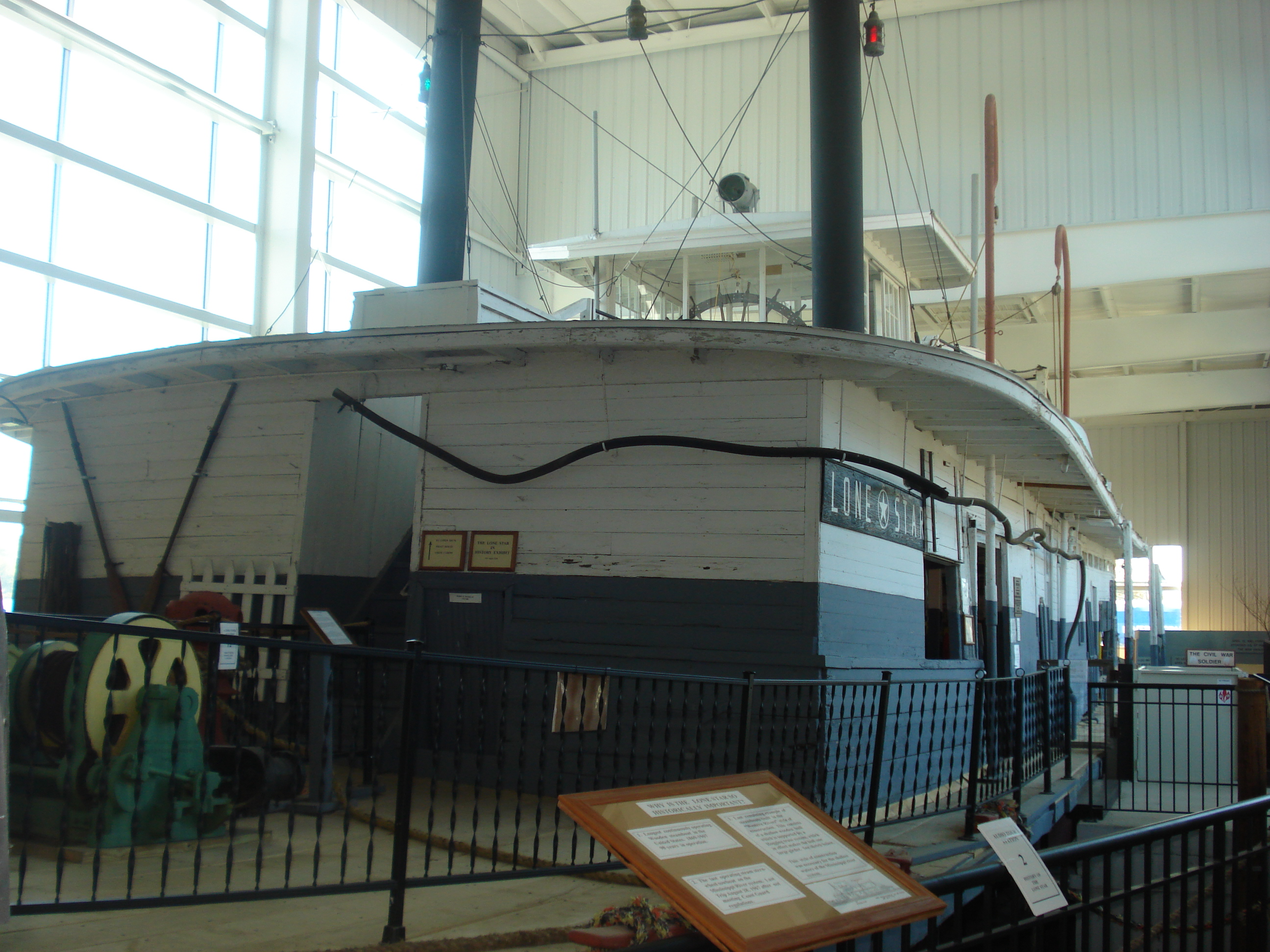
The towboat Lone Star

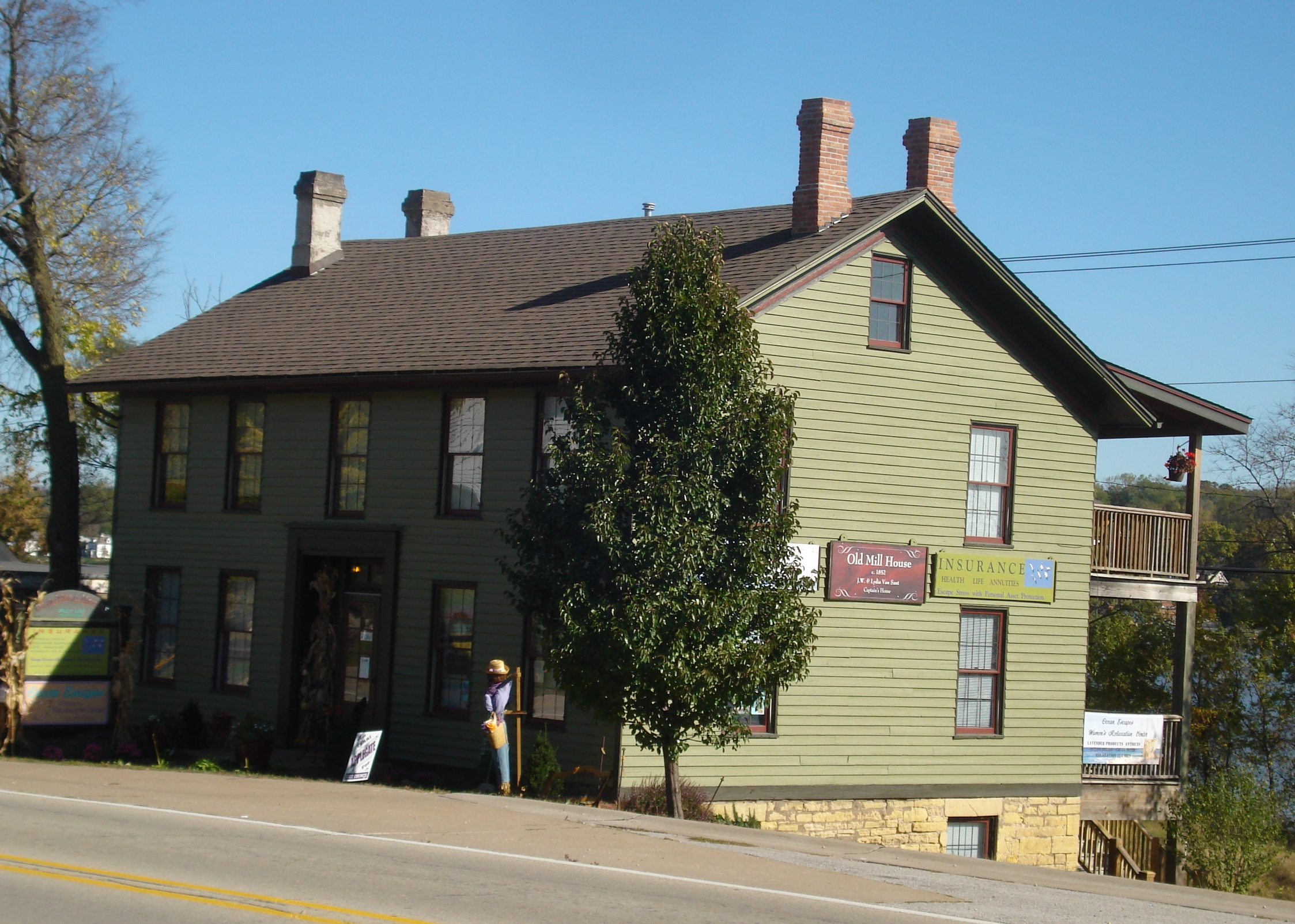
Old Mill House

The first settlers who came to the area that is now Le Claire arrived in the mid-1830s. Two towns were platted on the Mississippi River by the end of that decade, Parkhurst to the north and Le Claire to the south. The narrow strip of land between the two towns was called Middletown. Parkhurst and Middletown were incorporated into Le Claire in the 1850s. The economic life of the area was dependent on the Mississippi. Le Claire sits at the head of a 15-mile (24 km) stretch of river down to Davenport that is strewn with rocks and was known as the Upper Rapids. Knowledgeable river pilots were required to guide steamboats through the rapids and many of them lived in Le Claire. The home of William Rambo (430 N. Cody Rd.), who was engaged in this endeavor, is located in the district. Other industries included stone quarries and brickyards that were able to utilize the areas wealth of limestone and clay. Grist and lumber mills were also an important element of the economy. The homes of John McCaffrey (208 N. Cody Rd.) and George Tromley Sr. (806 N. Cody Rd.), who made their living in the lumber industry, are located here. The Le Claire Marine Railway boatyards were established by Thomas Lancaster and Levi Chamberlin in the early 1850s. The boatyards and the accompanying Old Mill House (419 N. Cody Rd.) were bought by J.W. Van Sant in 1862. It grew to become the town's second largest employer after the river. J.W.'s son Samuel made his living off the river at Le Claire before moving to Minnesota where he eventually became the state's governor. Samuel's house was located at 322 N. Cody Road.

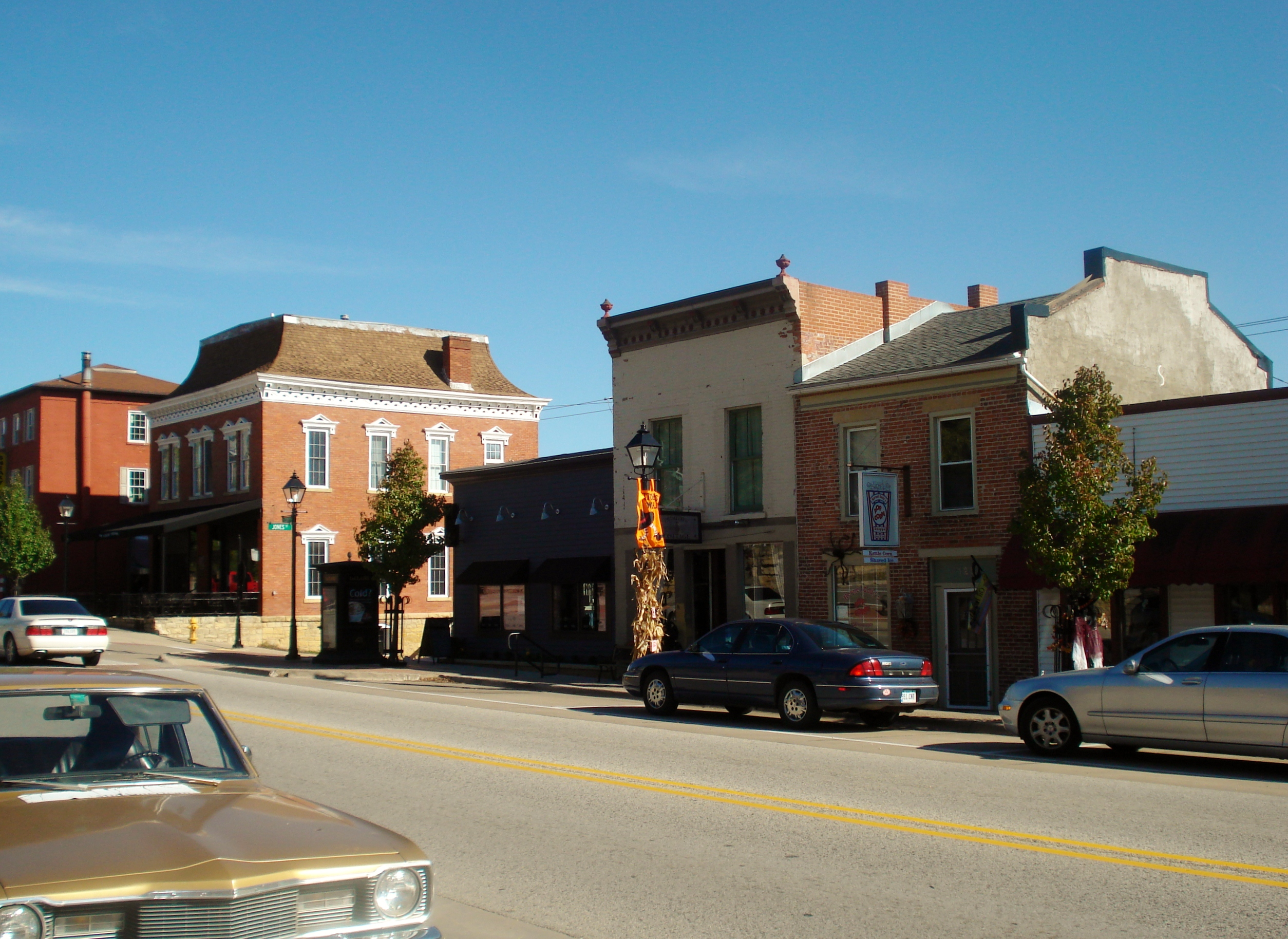
East side of Cody Road

The decades at the end of the 19th century saw a decline in Le Claire's economic fortunes. The mills closed and the railroads replaced the steamboat as the primary form of passenger and commercial transportation. The forests of northern Minnesota and Wisconsin became depleted so the lumber industry declined along the Mississippi. Small-scale commercial ventures continued in Le Claire and the brick commercial blocks along Cody Road were built. The town itself declined in population from 1,121 in 1875 to about 700 by 1910. The town stagnated until the 1950s when the continued growth of the Quad Cities down river turned Le Claire into a bedroom community of the larger metro area. By the late 20th century the houses remained occupied and in good condition, but the commercial buildings were largely empty and rundown. It was at this time that the town started to be transformed by new shops and cafes opening in the commercial area. The commercial district received a $6 million makeover by the city beginning in 2007. Forty-four new businesses opened between 2004 and 2014, and the population grew from 2,868 in 2000 to almost 4,000.

== Architecture ==
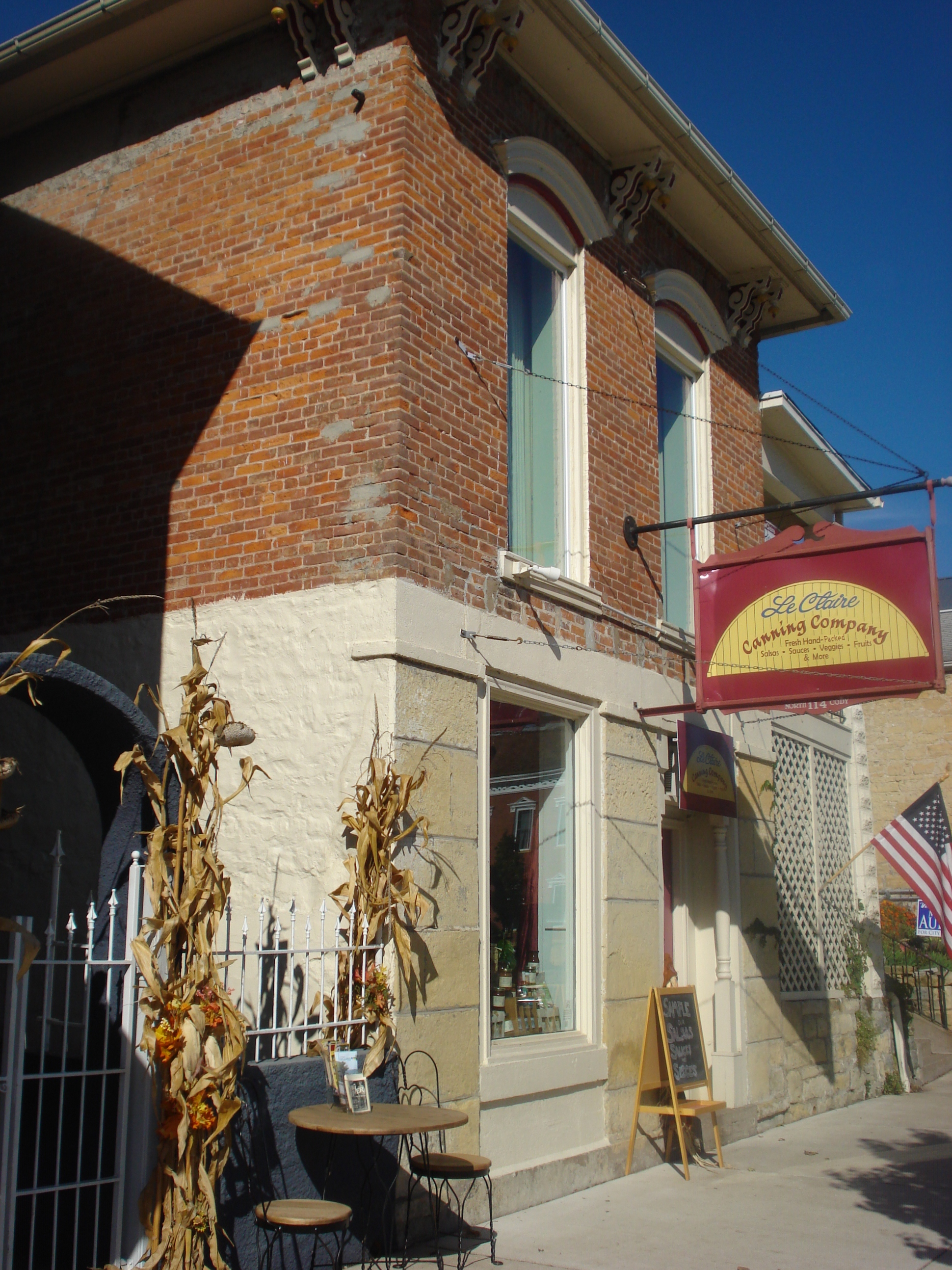
Commercial building on Cody Road

None of the facilities that were associated with Le Claire's 19th century industries are extant. What remains are commercial and residential structures built between 1850 and 1900 and new construction. The commercial buildings from the 1850s and 1860s were built mostly of locally produced soft brick. The structures are narrow, two stories in height at street level, with either two or three bays on the main facade. They are capped by either broad, low-pitched gable or half-hip roof or a front-gable. For the most part, building foundations are from locally quarried limestone. The buildings on the east side of the street have exposed basements because the land drops steeply to the river at that point. The houses were built in either the Greek Revival style with symmetrical fronts and a gable roof, or in a vernacular form of the Italianate style with low hipped roofs and bracketed cornices. The houses were constructed mainly in wood or brick, and rarely in limestone.

Most of the commercial buildings from the later decades of the 19th century are brick Italianate structures that feature flat roofs and parapetted fronts. Some of them have metal cornices, which were popular in many Iowa commercial districts of that era. Houses from this period featured styles that were popular in the late Victorian era: Queen Anne, Eastiake, Shingle, as well as the Italianate. There are also a couple of small bungalows and plain, L-shaped front-gable houses. The tallest structure is the three-story Bard Hotel (207 N. Cody Road). The old Le Claire city hall at 201-203 N. Cody has a concave hipped roof, pedimented window hoods, and a decorative cornice. The former Presbyterian Church, located at 322 N. Cody Road, is the only historic church building in the district. It is a small frame structure that is four bays long with a central entrance tower on the front.
