= Le Claire Township, Scott County, Iowa =

Le Claire Township
- Township
- Location in Scott County
- Coordinates: 41°37′06″N 090°23′11″W
- Country: United States
- State: Iowa
- County: Scott

Area
  - Total: 26.30 sq mi (68.12 km^{2})
  - Land: 24.31 sq mi (62.95 km^{2})
  - Water: 2.00 sq mi (5.17 km^{2}) 7.59%
- Elevation: 745 ft (227 m)

Population (2000)
  - Total: 4,263
  - Density: 175/sq mi (67.7/km^{2})
- GNIS feature ID: 0468195

Le Claire Township is a township in Scott County, Iowa, USA. As of the 2000 census, its population was 4,263.

== Geography ==
Le Claire Township covers an area of 26.3 square miles (68 km^{2}) and contains one incorporated settlement, Le Claire. According to the USGS, it contains four cemeteries: Fairview, Glendale, Jacks and LeClaire Prairie.

The streams of McCarty Creek, Olathea Creek, Silver Creek and Sycamore Creek run through this township.

== Transportation ==
Le Claire Township contains two airports or landing strips: Schurr Airport and Schurr Landing Strip.
