= Kattenbracher House =

Historic house in Iowa, United States

- Kattenbracker House
- U.S. National Register of Historic Places
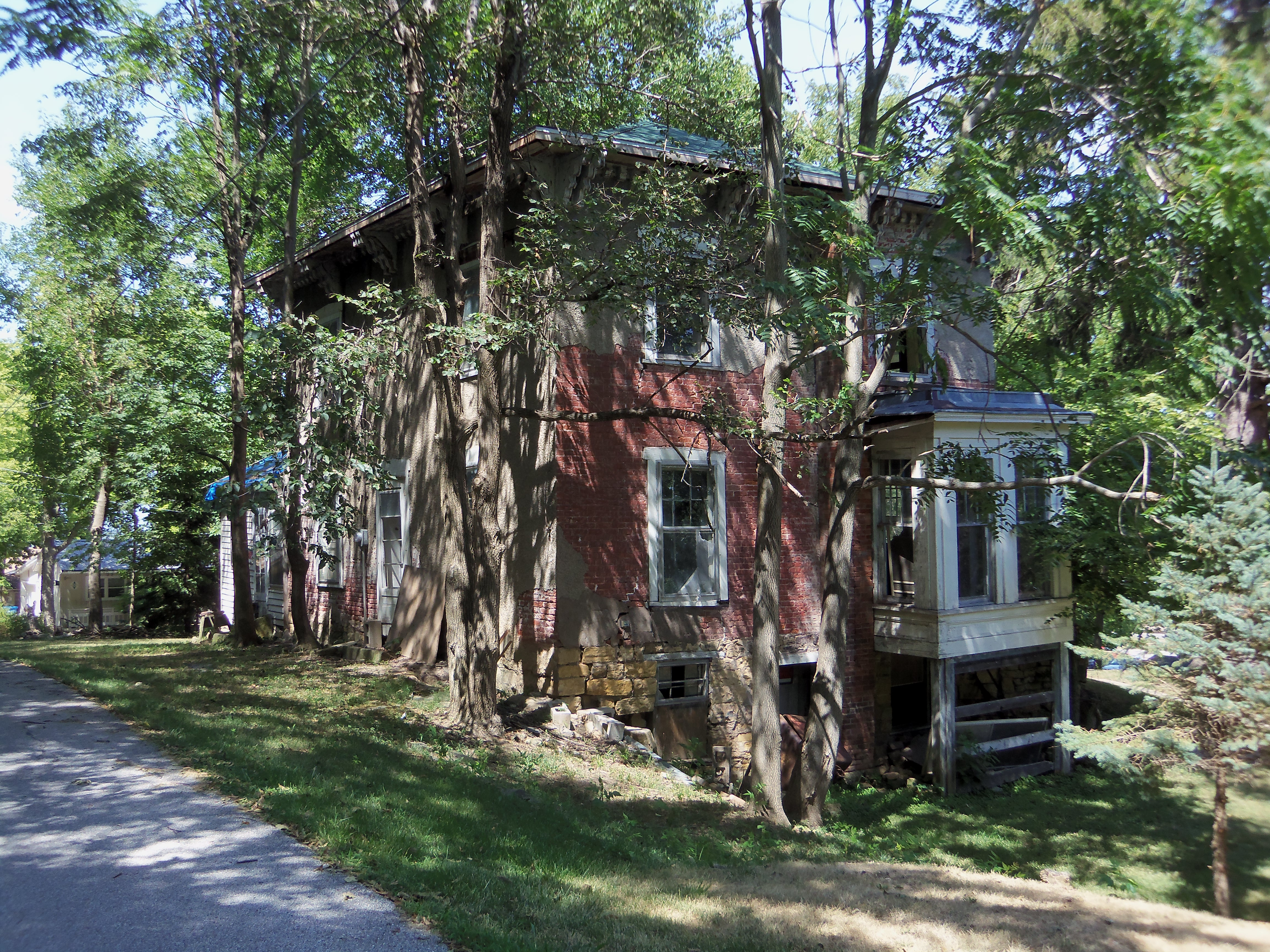

- Location within Iowa Location within the United States
- Location: 1125 S. 2nd St. Le Claire, Iowa
- Coordinates: 41°36′35.8086″N 90°20′42.1152″W
- Area: less than one acre
- Built: 1860
- MPS: Houses of Mississippi River Men TR
- NRHP reference No.: 79003701
- Added to NRHP: April 13, 1979

The Kattenbracker House is an historic building located in Le Claire, Iowa, United States. The house has been listed on the National Register of Historic Places since 1979. The property is part of the Houses of Mississippi River Men Thematic Resource, which covers the homes of men from LeClaire who worked on the Mississippi River as riverboat captains, pilots, builders and owners.

== History ==
The Kattenbracher family were German immigrants who established the C. Kattenbracher & Son foundry located in the original town of Parkhurst along the river. The town was later incorporated into Le Claire. The foundry supplied metalwork and made repairs for the Le Claire Marine Railway boatyards that were run by J.W. Van Sant. The family built this house in 1860.

== Architecture ==
The Kattenbracher House is a two-story, rectangular, brick house built on a stone foundation. At one time the house was covered with stucco, but it has subsequently peeled off. The main facade is three bays wide, and the main entrance is located in the center. The windows feature flat enframements and shallow, triangular pediments. The house is capped by a low hipped roof with wide bracketed eaves and modillions. There is a protruding, rectangular bay window on the southeast corner of the house. A single-story frame addition was built on the north side. It features a gable roof and now contains the main entrance into the house.
