= McCaffrey House =

Historic house in Iowa, United States

- U.S. National Register of Historic Places
- U.S. Historic district – Contributing property
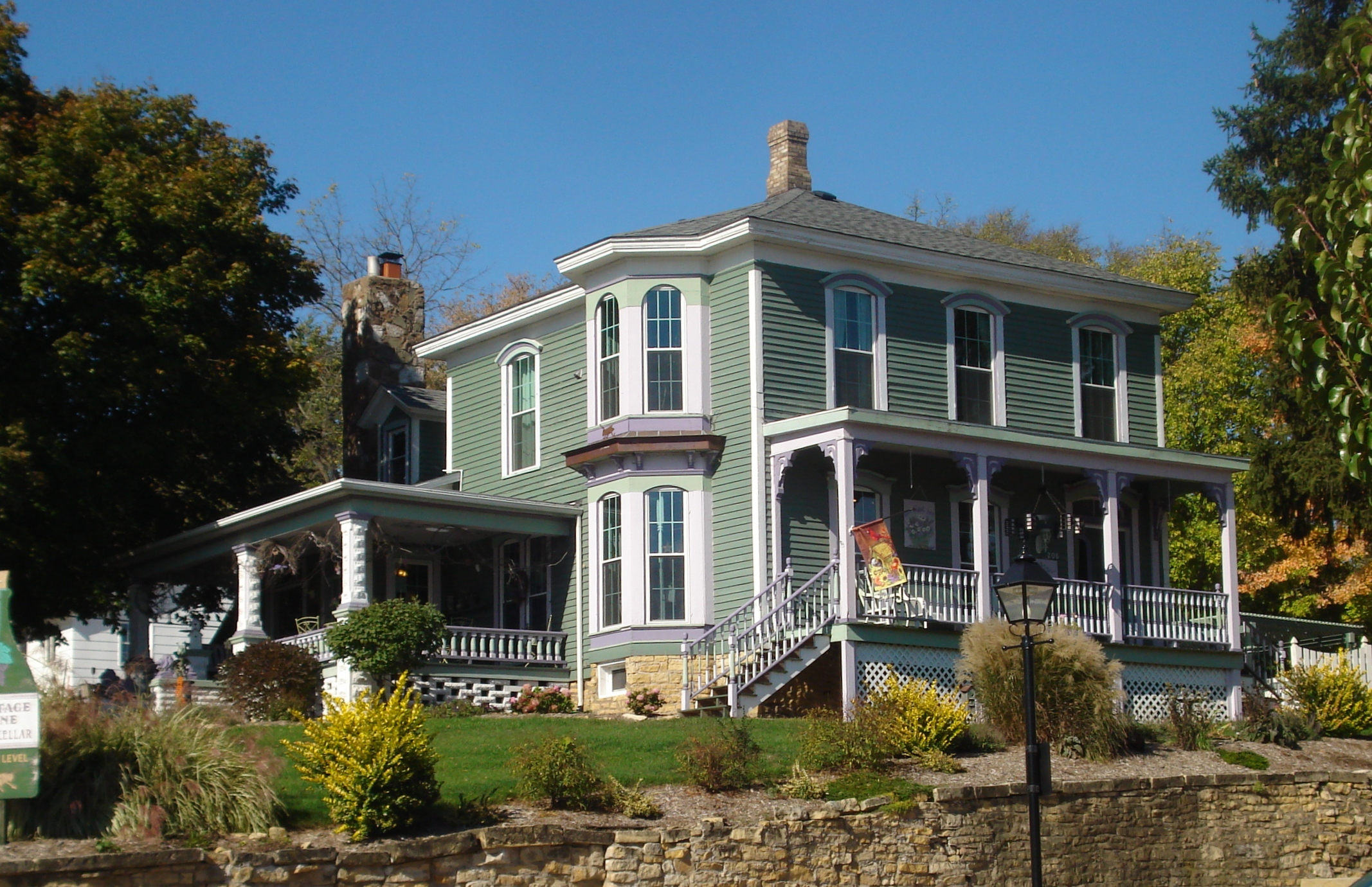

- Location within Iowa Location within the United States
- Location: 208 N. Cody Rd. Le Claire, Iowa
- Coordinates: 41°35′56″N 90°20′37″W
- Area: approximately 1 acre (0.40 ha)
- Built: 1870
- Architectural style: Vernacular Italianate
- Part of: Cody Road Historic District (ID79000943)
- MPS: Houses of Mississippi River Men TR
- NRHP reference No.: 79003702
- Added to NRHP: April 13, 1979

The McCaffrey House is an historic building located in Le Claire, Iowa, United States, and has been listed on the National Register of Historic Places since 1979. The property is part of the Houses of Mississippi River Men Thematic Resource, which covers the homes of men from LeClaire who worked on the Mississippi River as riverboat captains, pilots, builders and owners. It is also a contributing property in the Cody Road Historic District.

== History ==
John McCaffrey was Irish and born in the United Kingdom of Great Britain and Ireland in 1842. He immigrated with his family to St. Louis when he was a child. McCaffrey began working on the river when he was 13 as a hand on a floating raft. He went on to work in a variety of jobs during his long career on the river. He was a boat clerk, pilot, captain, and a raft boat owner. By 1864 he was working as river pilot on a regular basis on the Upper Rapids. His first boat was the Alvira and he bought interests in the James Means and the Le Claire Belle. He also had interests in lumber and mining ventures. McCaffrey left Le Claire toward the end of his life and became a planter in Louisiana. He built this house in Le Claire in 1870.

== Architecture ==
The McCaffrey House is a two-story, frame, vernacular Italianate house built on a stone foundation. The frame construction of this house is somewhat unusual in Iowa as most Italianate houses are executed in brick. The exterior is covered in narrow clapboards with cornerboard that extend to the cornice. The main facade is three bays wide with the main entrance located to the right of center. The windows and the doors feature curved wooden lintels and flat enframements. The house is capped by a low hipped roof with a plain, unbracketed, wooden cornice. The south side of the house features a two-story polygonal bay that has a bracketed cornice above the main floor bay. The single-story screened porch on the south side and the chimney of rock on the rear are later additions. The house is located on a corner lot that is raised above the street, and it has a stone retaining wall on east and south sides.
