= Stone House (Le Claire, Iowa) =

Historic house in Iowa, United States

- U.S. National Register of Historic Places
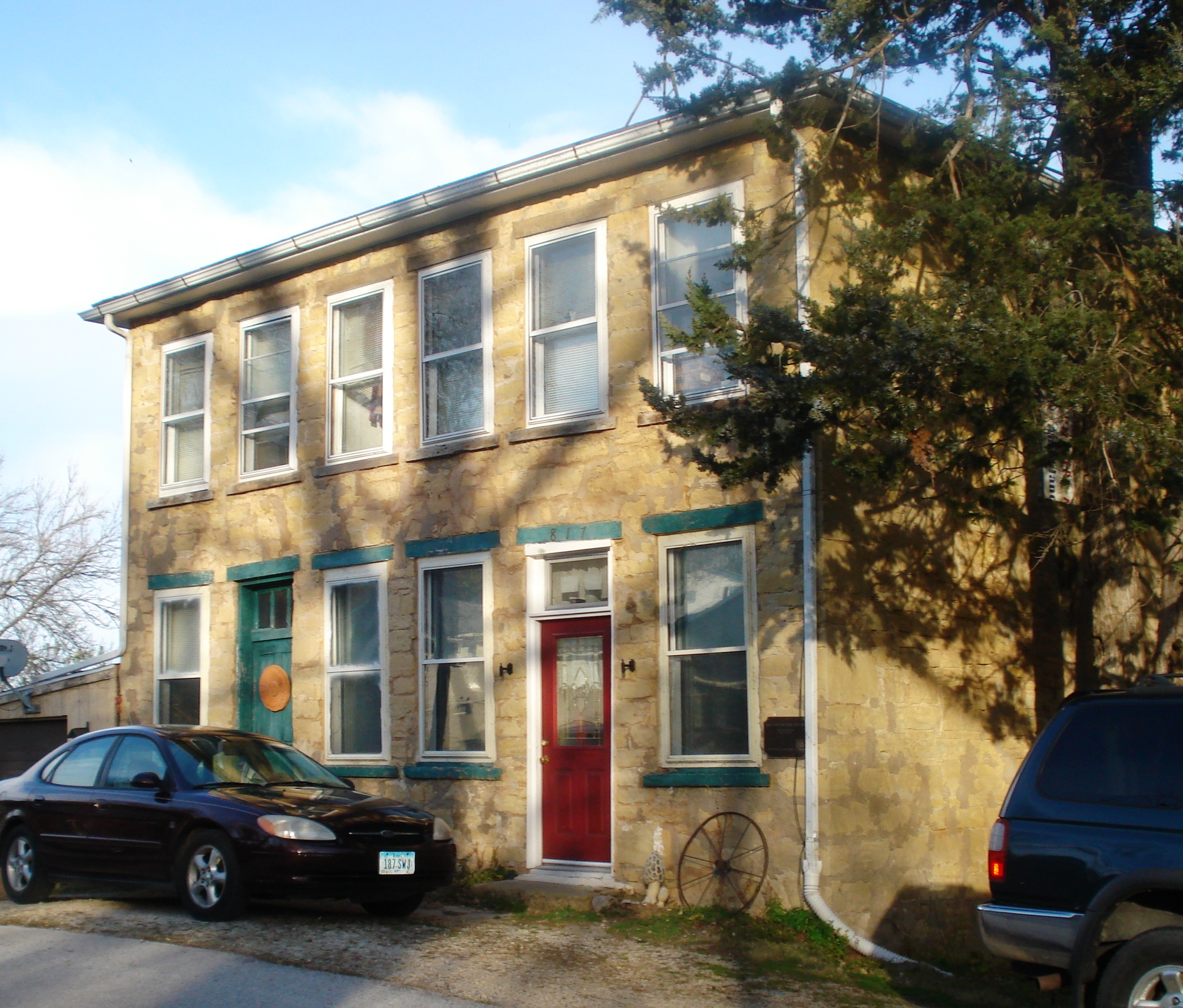

- Location within Iowa Location within the United States
- Location: 817 N. 2nd St. Le Claire, Iowa
- Coordinates: 41°36′22.88″N 90°20′42.91″W
- Area: less than one acre
- Architectural style: Vernacular
- NRHP reference No.: 83002528
- Added to NRHP: July 7, 1983

The Stone House is a historic building located in Le Claire, Iowa, United States. The house has been listed on the National Register of Historic Places since 1983.

== History ==
The Stone House was built in Parkhurst, which was a speculative suburb next to Le Claire, sometime in the 1850s. It is the only stone house in the area. Early owners of the house were area speculators that included Laurel Summers, who platted the town of Parkhurst, which is now a part of Le Claire, James Eads and Lyman Smith. Other owners include farmer Henry Stone, who settled in Scott County in 1844 and owned the house from 1866 to 1877. He was followed by L.G. and Phoebe Condit, also farmers, who lived in the house with a hired farm worker from 1877 to 1881. Henry and Emma Parmelee, who was the Condits' daughter, lived in the house with Phoebe Condit from about 1885. They sold the house to the Hurd family in 1892 and they owned it as late as 1920.

== Architecture ==
The structure is a vernacular early settlement-era structure. The exterior walls are composed of random ashlar blocks of limestone. The building follows a rectangular plan. It is capped with a hipped roof with a ridge. All of the windows have stone sills and lintels, and the doors are capped with transoms. The house is situated on a sloping lot so the basement on the east elevation is exposed. At one time the east elevation was covered by a double porch.
