= John Smith House (Le Claire, Iowa) =

Historic house in Iowa, United States

- U.S. National Register of Historic Places
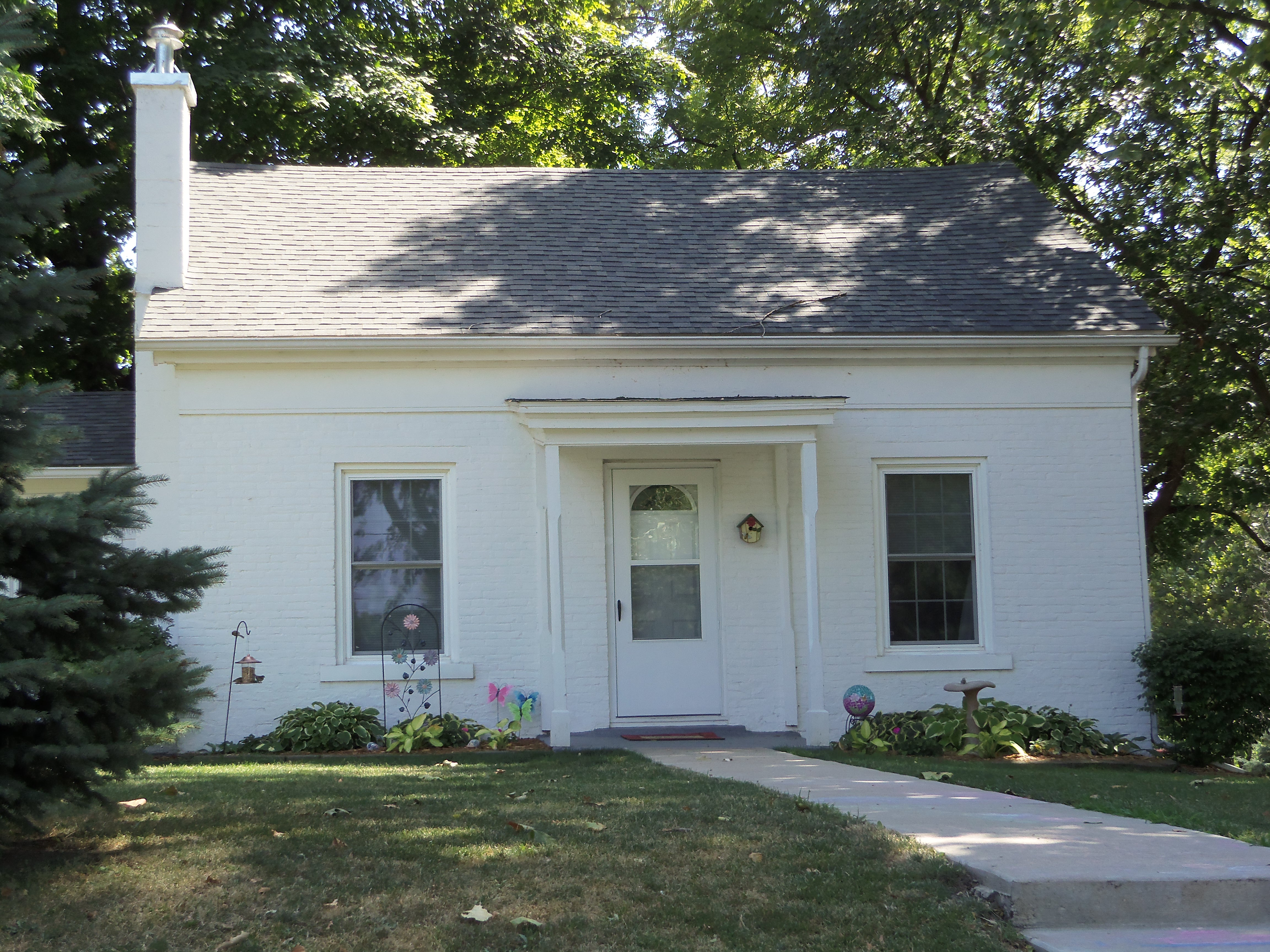

- Location within Iowa Location within the United States
- Location: 426 Dodge; Le Claire, Iowa
- Coordinates: 41°35′46.6722″N 90°20′55.233″W
- Area: less than one acre
- Built: 1852
- MPS: Houses of Mississippi River Men TR
- NRHP reference No.: 79003705
- Added to NRHP: April 13, 1979

The John Smith House is an historic building located in Le Claire, Iowa, United States. The house has been listed on the National Register of Historic Places since 1979. The property is part of the Houses Houses of Mississippi River Men Thematic Resource, which covers the homes of men from LeClaire who worked on the Mississippi River as riverboat captains, pilots, builders and owners.

== John Smith ==
John Smith was a son of Ira Smith, who was one of the founders of Le Claire. After the Effie Afton struck the pier of the new railroad bridge between Davenport, Iowa and Rock Island, Illinois in 1856, Smith was hired by the railroad to prove that a steamboat could safely pass under the bridge if it is properly handled. Because the railroad was a competitor of the steamboat industry, river captains would not hire Smith as a river pilot until the 1860s. Along with the Van Sants, also of Le Claire, he developed the raftboat. It pushed the lumber rafts down to the river from the forests in the north to the mills further south. They also developed the bowboat, which was a small sternwheeler set crosswise at the front of the raft to provide additional control over the direction of movement.

== Architecture ==
The John Smith House is a small one story, brick structure built on a stone foundation. It follows a center hall plan. The facade is three bays wide and the side elevation is two bays. The main entrance is sheltered by a small porch with a flat-roof that is supported by slender wooden posts. The windows have flat stone lintels and sills. There is a wide wooden frieze that runs across the entire front facade and is beaded at the bottom. It is topped by a gable roof whose ridge parallels the front facade. A small, single-story frame addition was added to the east side.
