= Rambo House =

Historic house in Iowa, United States

- U.S. National Register of Historic Places
- U.S. Historic district – Contributing property
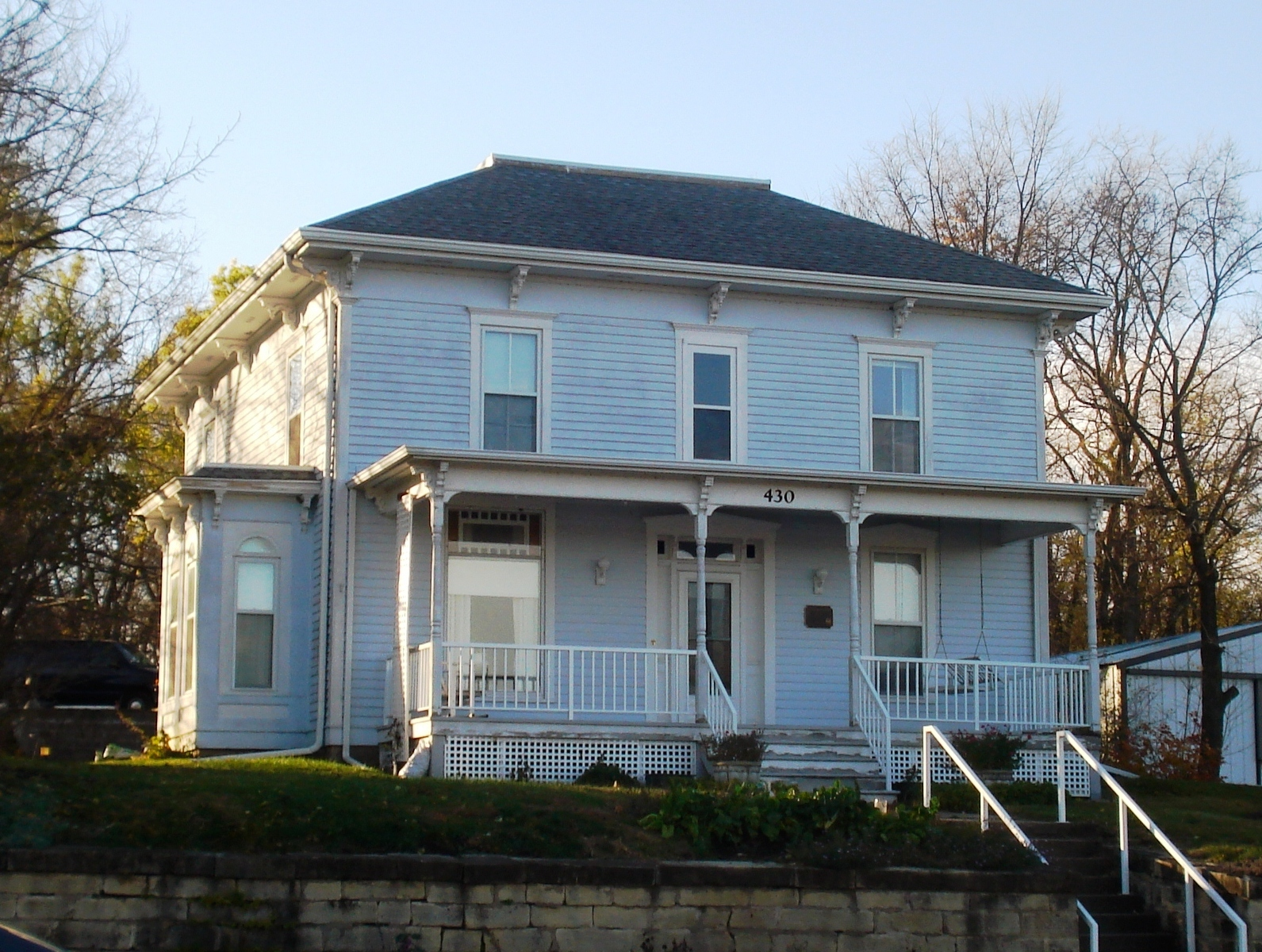

- Location within Iowa Location within the United States
- Location: 430 N. Cody Rd. Le Claire, Iowa
- Coordinates: 41°36′5.27″N 90°20′38.28″W
- Built: 1855
- Architectural style: Italianate
- Part of: Cody Road Historic District (ID79000943)
- MPS: Houses of Mississippi River Men TR
- NRHP reference No.: 79003704
- Added to NRHP: April 13, 1979

The Rambo House is an historic building located in Le Claire, Iowa, United States. The residence was individually listed on the National Register of Historic Places since 1979. The property is part of the Houses of Mississippi River Men Thematic Resource, which covers the homes of men from LeClaire who worked on the Mississippi River as riverboat captains, pilots, builders and owners. It is also a contributing property in the Cody Road Historic District.

== History ==
When William Rambo came to Le Claire in 1844 he established the Scott and Rambo sawmill south of the town. From 1853 to 1871 he worked as a river pilot on the Upper Rapids. He built this house in 1855. While he worked on the river he also invested in real estate in Nebraska. His son James began his river career as a raft hand in 1862 and the following year he received his pilot's license.

== Architecture ==
The Rambo House is a two-story, three-bay, transitional Greek Revival/Italianate frame house. It is also two bays deep and has cornerboards that terminate in molding under the broad eaves and large brackets of the hipped roof. The main entrance is located in the center bay and it features a triangular pedimented lintel. The windows on both floors are tall with straight, molded lintels and flat enframements. The front porch extends across the facade and has a pent roof that is supported by slender turned posts. A polygonal bay on the first floor protrudes from the south side. The house is located on a lot that sits above street level and is surrounded by a stone retaining wall.
