= Stone School (Le Claire, Iowa) =

- U.S. National Register of Historic Places
- Stone School in February, 1974

- Location within Iowa Location within the United States
- Location: West of Le Claire, Iowa
- Coordinates: 41°36′43.5″N 90°23′55.8″W
- Area: less than one acre
- Built: 1866
- NRHP reference No.: 77000558
- Added to NRHP: December 27, 1977

Stone School was a historic one-room school located west of Le Claire, Iowa, United States in rural Scott County. It was built in 1866 and listed on the National Register of Historic Places in 1977.

== History ==
Horatio Stone moved to Scott County in 1839 and his brother Henry followed in 1844. The brothers established farms on Sections 5, 31, and 32 in Le Claire Township. They each had a large family and together they built a log structure for use as a private school. The families built the present school in 1866, by which time six of Horatio's children and all six of Henry's children would have been able to have attended the school. The schoolhouse was eventually incorporated into the local public school system as Independent School District #1. The building ceased being a school in 1955 and it was used as a pig sty. It had fallen into disrepair before it was dismantled.

== Architecture ==
The Stone School was a rectangular-shaped structure built of limestone that was quarried locally. It was a 46.5-by-26-foot (14.2 by 7.9 m) structure. The building had a gable roof that was composed of wood shingles. The distinctive feature of the structure was a belfry with louvred, round arch openings. It featured decorative millwork and was capped by an unusual flared roof. The windows and doors were evenly spaced and each one was topped with decorative stone lintels. An ocular window with stone molding was located on the gable end. The corners of the structure were quoined. On the east elevation of the building were two entryways. They were separate entrances for the boys, on the south side, and for the girls on the north side.
