= George Tromley Sr. House =

Historic house in Iowa, United States

- U.S. National Register of Historic Places
- U.S. Historic district – Contributing property
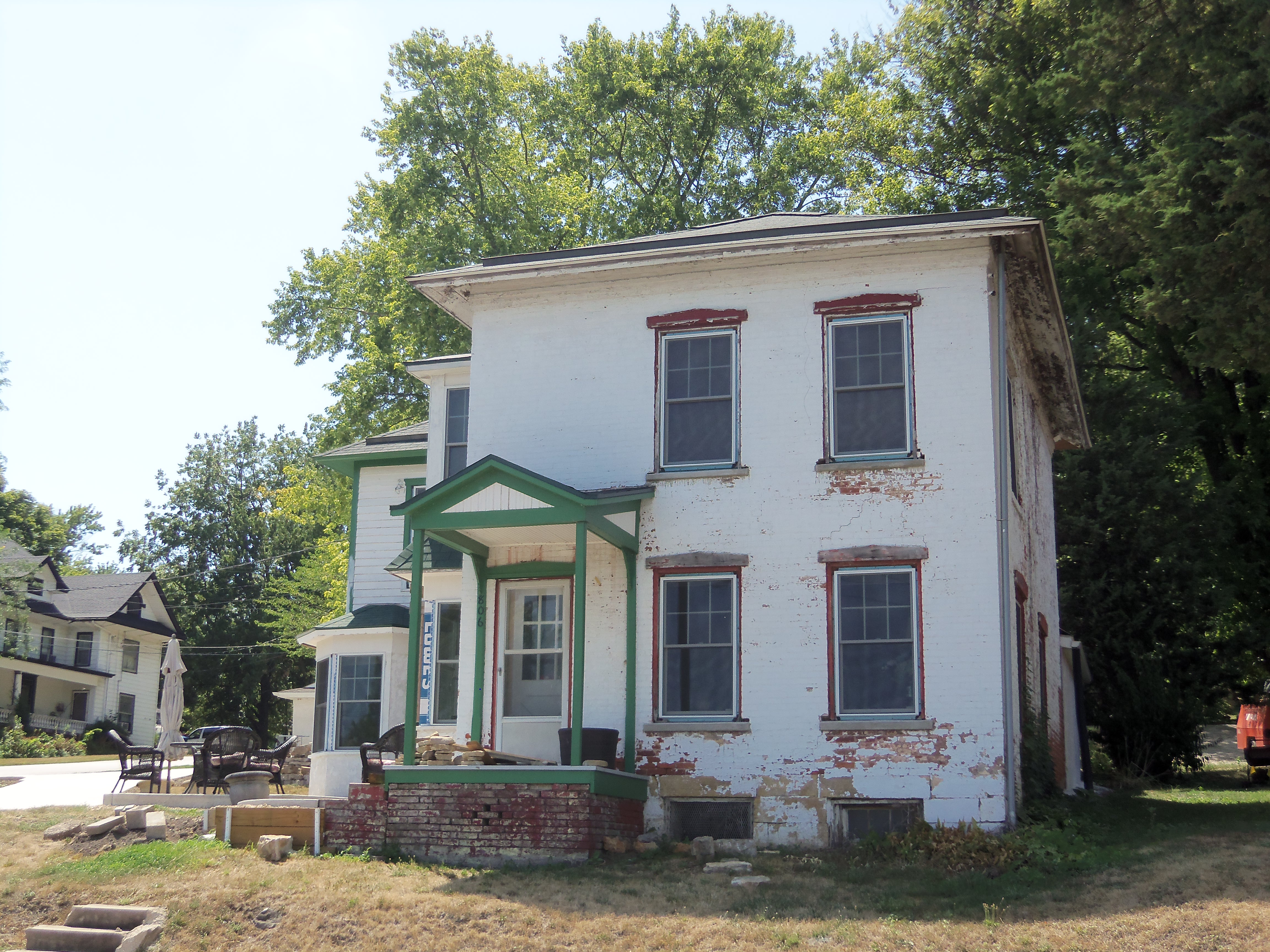

- Location within Iowa Location within the United States
- Location: 806 N. Cody Rd. Le Claire, Iowa
- Coordinates: 41°36′22″N 90°20′40″W
- Built: 1850
- Part of: Cody Road Historic District (ID79000943)
- MPS: Houses of Mississippi River Men TR
- NRHP reference No.: 79003709
- Added to NRHP: April 13, 1979

The George Tromley Sr. House is a historic building located in Le Claire, Iowa, United States. It has been listed on the National Register of Historic Places since 1979. The property is part of the Houses of Mississippi River Men Thematic Resource, which covers the homes of men from LeClaire who worked on the Mississippi River as riverboat captains, pilots, builders, and owners. It is also a contributing property in the Cody Road Historic District.

== George Tromley Sr. ==
Tromley sailed the Mississippi River before the advent of the steamboat. He began his career on the river floating log rafts, which were common before the Civil War, and he built the first raft boat on the river at Le Claire. Eventually he sailed the river as a captain. Tromley and Thomas Doughty, a local engineer, took the small steamer the Le Claire upriver where they conducted an experiment to use a steamboat to push a log raft. The Le Claire was not powerful enough to control the raft, but the experiment led to a major development in being able to transport logs from the northern forests to the mills further south. Samuel Van Sant of Le Claire was able to use its results to build a boat that was large enough and had enough power to tow a log raft in 1870. George Tromley Sr. married Katherine McCaffrey and they raised three children. The house of their eldest son, George Tromley Jr., is also listed on the National Register of Historic Places.

== Architecture ==
The George Tromley Sr. House is a two-story structure that was built in two sections. The older section of the house is in the front and is constructed of brick, that is now painted white, and is capped with a low pitched hipped roof. It features a three-bay front with the main entrance to the left that is sheltered by a small gable roofed porch. It is probably a later addition. The windows have lintels with nearly flat pediments. The newer section was built of frame construction on the back of the older section, and it is also capped with a hipped roof. Its windows are set in flat enframements and are topped with narrow cornices. A single-story porch with pent roof is located in the angle formed by the two sections. It is supported by slender turned posts. A two-story rectangular bay, with a small pent roof separating the two stories, protrudes from the south side of the older section. A single-story polygonal bay is located on the southeast corner of the newer section.
