= George Tromley Jr. House =

Historic house in Iowa, United States

- U.S. National Register of Historic Places
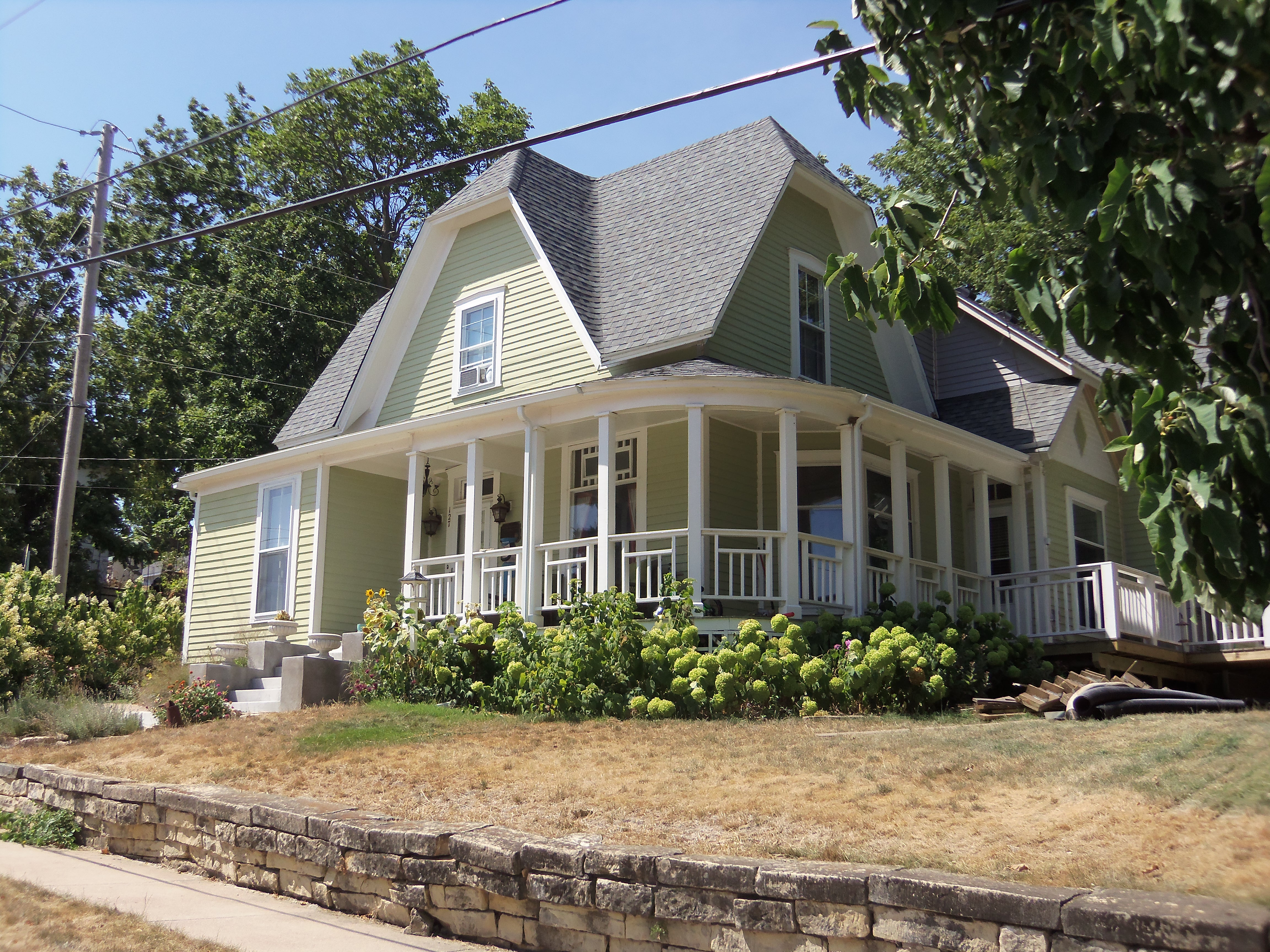

- Location within Iowa Location within the United States
- Location: 127 Jones St. Le Claire, Iowa
- Coordinates: 41°35′56.0796″N 90°20′41.0742″W
- Area: less than one acre
- Built: 1865
- MPS: Houses of Mississippi River Men TR
- NRHP reference No.: 79003710
- Added to NRHP: April 13, 1979

The George Tromley Jr. House is a historic building located in Le Claire, Iowa, United States. It has been listed on the National Register of Historic Places since 1979. The property is part of the Houses of Mississippi River Men Thematic Resource, which covers the homes of men from LeClaire who worked on the Mississippi River as riverboat captains, pilots, builders and owners.

== George Tromley Jr. ==
Tromley was born in 1857 at LeClaire to George and Katherine (McCaffrey) Tromely. Like his father, he worked as a river pilot on the Mississippi River. He married Alice LaCock and they had an adopted daughter. His parents' home, the George Tromley Sr. House, is also listed on the National Register of Historic Places.

== Architecture ==
The George Tromley Jr. House is a 1½-story frame structure that was built in 1865. The house is noteworthy because of its use of the jerkinhead gable roof with a large jerkinhead dormer centered on the main facade. This makes it among the more picturesque houses found in Le Claire. The exterior is faced with narrow clapboards. There is a one-story porch that curves around the southeast corner of the house and it connects with a one-story, gable-roofed section on the northeast corner. This section may have been used as a summer kitchen. The house is located on a raised lot that is surrounded by a stone retaining wall.
