= Edward S. Barrows House =

Historic house in Iowa, United States

- U.S. National Register of Historic Places
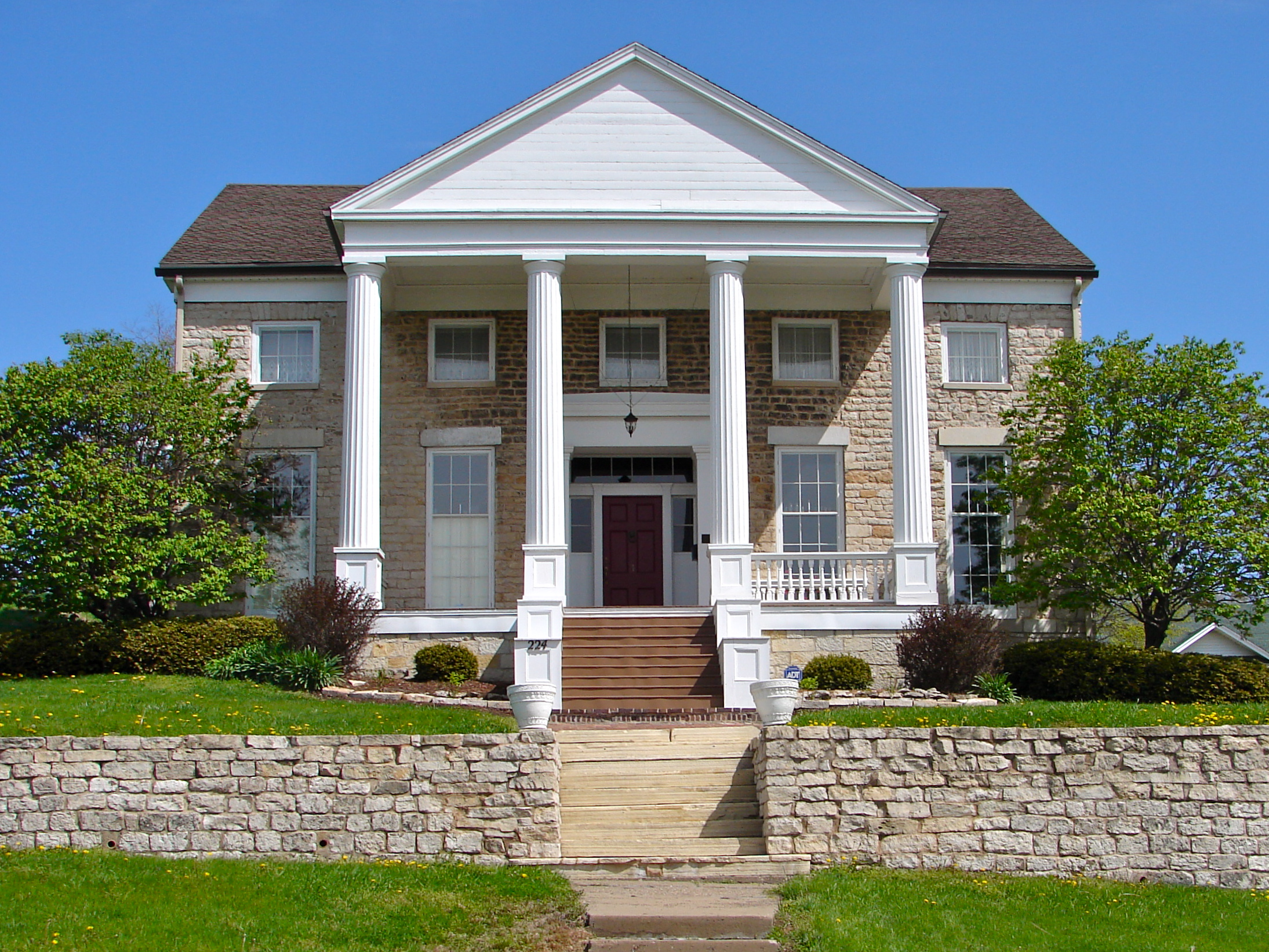

- Location within Iowa Location within the United States
- Location: 224 E. 6th St. Davenport, Iowa
- Coordinates: 41°31′33″N 90°34′17″W
- Area: less than one acre
- Built: c. 1850
- Architectural style: Greek Revival
- NRHP reference No.: 76000807
- Added to NRHP: November 21, 1976

The Edward S. Barrows House, also known as the Capital Apartments, is a historic building located just north of downtown Davenport, Iowa, United States. It has been listed on the National Register of Historic Places since 1976. The nomination form and the National Register erroneously attribute the house to Edward S. Barrows, as all other sources give his first name as Egbert.

== Dr. Egbert Storr Barrows ==
Barrows was a native of Middlebury, Vermont and he studied medicine in Frankfort, Kentucky. He was a surgeon in the United States Army during the Seminole Wars. When he first came to Iowa he settled in Rockingham before settling in the nascent community of Davenport in 1836. Barrows was the first person to practice medicine in Scott County and the second person in all of the Wisconsin Territory. He had a seemingly odd medical philosophy as he advised his friends and patients to leave doctors "severely alone and take as little medicine as possible." In 1856 he helped to establish the Scott County Medical Society.

Barrows had this house built around 1850. He was one of the few people in the city's early years who was able to afford the style on a large scale. Barrows died in 1892 and at some point the house was divided into apartments, and stucco covered the fieldstone exterior. It had become a derelict property by the early 1970s. The interior was filled with garbage, and the interior was vandalized. Lolita Bower spent 30 years restoring the house.

== Architecture ==
Greek Revival was the first style of architecture to have an impact in Davenport. The side gabled house features a large porch across the front. It is capped by a triangular pediment that is held up by Doric columns. The long rectangular windows on the first floor are decorated with simple, molded cornices. A simple cornice is also found at the roofline. One source says that Barrow's could not find a local craftsman to create the columns for the porch so he did it himself. Another source says they were created in the south and they were shipped to Davenport via steamboat and brought to this location by teams of horses. The native stone was taken from a nearby riverbank.
