= James Gamble House =

Historic house in Iowa, United States

- U.S. National Register of Historic Places
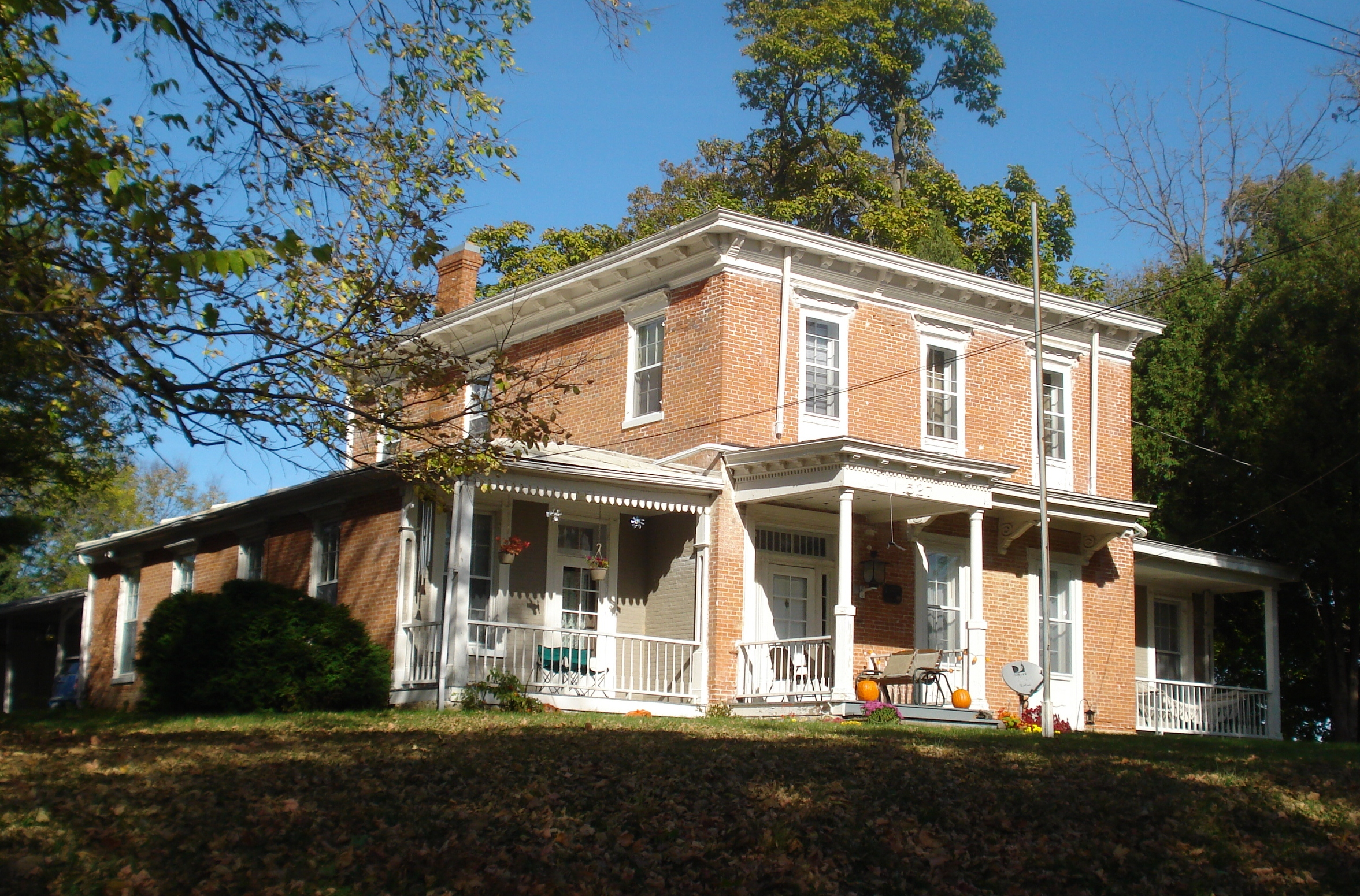

- Location within Iowa Location within the United States
- Location: 527 Wisconsin Ave. Le Claire, Iowa
- Coordinates: 41°35′52″N 90°20′57″W
- Area: 1 acre (0.40 ha)
- Built: 1855
- Architectural style: Italianate
- NRHP reference No.: 79003692
- Added to NRHP: March 30, 1979

The James Gamble House is a historic building located in Le Claire, Iowa, United States. It has been listed on the National Register of Historic Places since 1979.

== History ==
James Gamble was a native of the United Kingdom of Great Britain and Ireland and was born on Ireland in 1821. He immigrated with his parents to the United States in 1823. They first settled in Delaware and then moved to Pittsburgh in 1836. Gamble's entered the printing and publishing business and co-published the Warsaw Signal in Warsaw, Illinois from 1840 to about 1842. He studied medicine in New Orleans and St. Louis before he received his medical degree from the University of Missouri in 1847. Gamble moved to Le Claire that same year and practiced medicine there for close to 50 years. He was active in local medical associations and served on the Le Claire school board for over 20 years.

== Architecture ==
The Gamble House is a two-story brick structure built on a limestone foundation. It reflects the Italianate palazzo style. The bricks are laid in a 6-course common bond. The central block of the house is three bays wide and it is flanked by single-story wings that are two bays wide. The house is capped by a low hipped roof with broad eaves. The wings also feature low hips with plain, narrow cornices. The main entrance is located off-center to the left and it is framed with sidelights and a transom. The porch is possibly a later construction. Its flat roof is supported by two wooden columns on high pedestals. To the right of the entrance is a narrow, flat roof that is supported on large brackets that overhangs two tall windows. The porches on the side wings are simple structures with square, freestanding and engaged posts. The balustrades are very slender, turned spindles that are similar to those of the entrance porch. Behind the rear of the house is a single-story wing that was probably used as a summer kitchen. It is attached to the main house block by a long roof that is supported by slender posts with fringed edges that are similar to those on the front porch.
