= Dawley House =

Historic house in Iowa, United States

- U.S. National Register of Historic Places
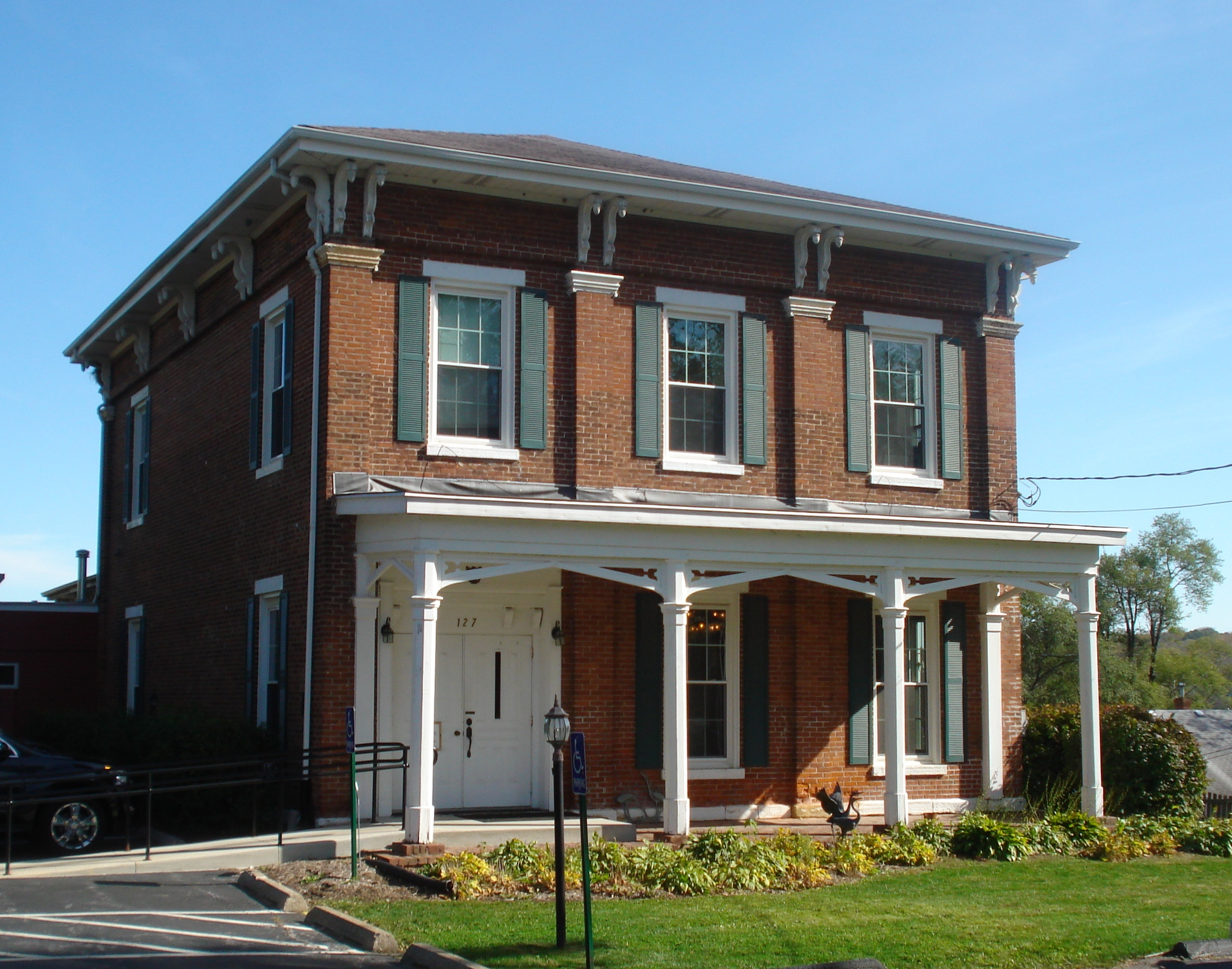

- Location within Iowa Location within the United States
- Location: 127 S. 2nd St. Le Claire, Iowa
- Coordinates: 41°35′48″N 90°20′41″W
- Built: 1851
- Architectural style: Vernacular Italianate
- MPS: Houses of Mississippi River Men TR
- NRHP reference No.: 79003699
- Added to NRHP: April 13, 1979

The Dawley House is an historic property located in Le Claire, Iowa, United States, and has been listed on the National Register of Historic Places since 1979. It is the former home of Daniel V. Dawley. The property is part of the Houses of Mississippi River Men Thematic Resource, which covers the homes of men from Le Claire who worked on the Mississippi River as riverboat captains, pilots, builders and owners.

== Daniel V. Dawley ==
Born in Vermont in 1811, Daniel V. Dawley worked in Troy, New York and New York City before moving to Iowa in 1834. He started his first river job as a clerk on the steamer Hero two years later. Dawley spent the next 38 years working on the river as either a clerk or captain, often for the Minnesota Packet Company. He worked on boats such as the Galena, the Henry Clay, and he was a part owner of the Golden Era. In 1881 Dawley was appointed the Le Claire postmaster. He died in 1893. His single-family house was converted into the Crane & Pelican Cafe.

== Architecture ==
The Dawley House is a two-story brick structure built on a stone foundation. It is a variation on the vernacular Italianate style. The bricks used in the construction were manufactured locally. The main facade of the house is three bays wide and four along the side elevations. The bays are separated by Flat brick pilasters that have narrow caps just below the cornice level. The house is capped by a shallow hipped roof with narrow eaves with paired brackets. The main entrance is located off-center to the left. The porch, which extends across the front of the facade, and is probably of a later construction. It is influenced by the Gothic Revival style and features thick chamfered posts. The windows are six over six sashes with flat lintels and sills. Built onto the rear of the house is a single-story kitchen wing. Like the main house block, it is capped with a bracketed hip roof and a wooden cornice. The small porch on the south side of the kitchen wing is supported by attenuated columns. The lot on which the house is built slopes steeply to the east. It features a stone retaining wall extends across its south side.
