= Arthur Ebeling House =

Historic house in Iowa, United States

- U.S. National Register of Historic Places
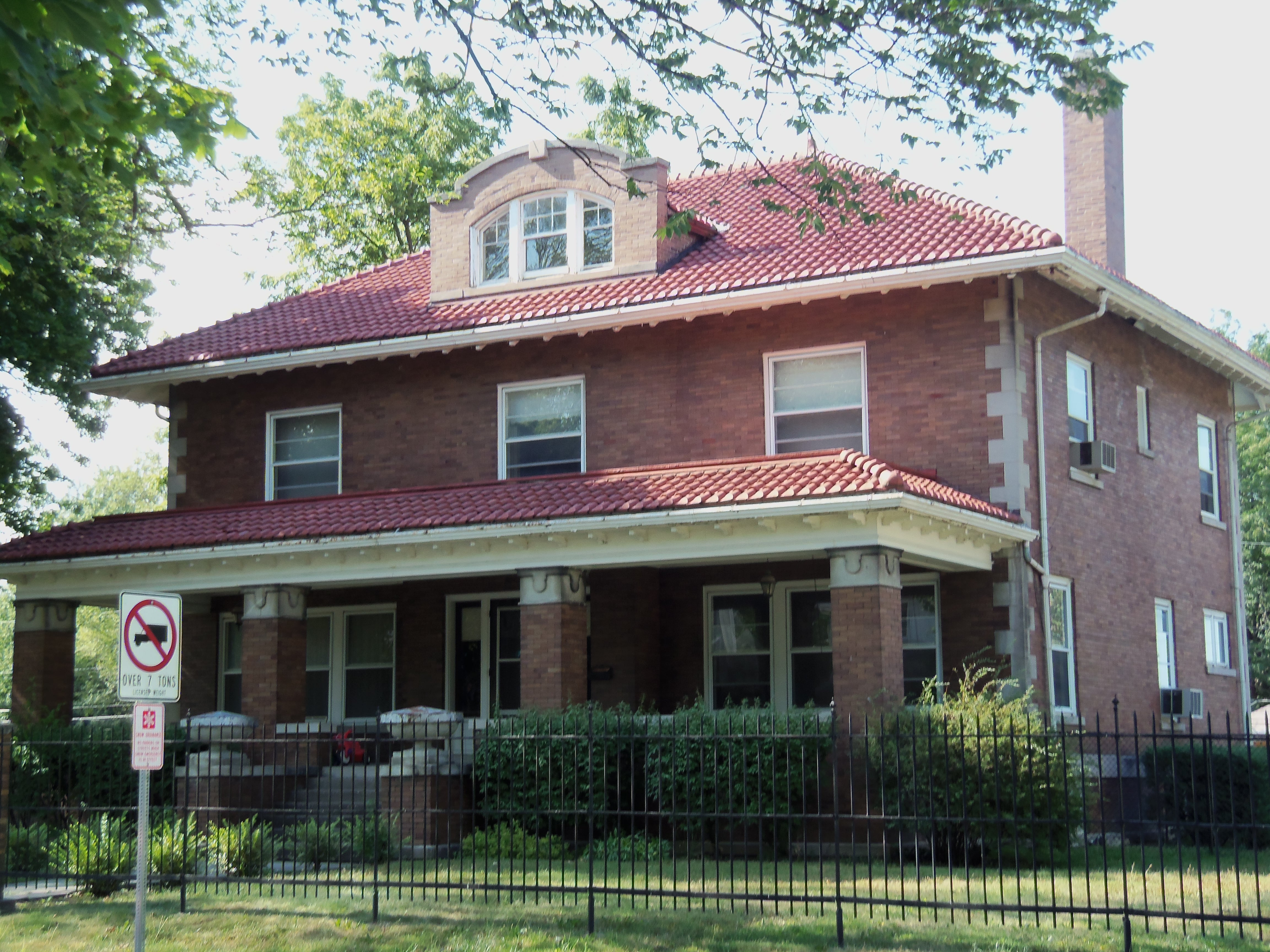

- Location within Iowa Location within the United States
- Location: 1106 W. 15th St. Davenport, Iowa
- Coordinates: 41°32′6″N 90°35′21″W
- Area: less than one acre
- Built: 1912-1913
- Architect: Arthur H. Ebeling
- Architectural style: Colonial Revival
- MPS: Davenport MRA
- NRHP reference No.: 84001397
- Added to NRHP: July 27, 1984

The Arthur Ebeling House is a historic building located on the west side of Davenport, Iowa, United States. The Colonial Revival house was designed by its original owner, Arthur Ebeling. It was built from 1912 to 1913 and it was listed on the National Register of Historic Places in 1984.

== Arthur Ebeling ==
Arthur H. Ebeling (1882–1965) was a prominent Davenport architect in the first half of the 20th century. He was born in neighboring Rock Island, Illinois. The family moved to Davenport when he was a boy and he was educated in the local public schools where he graduated with honors. He learned the architectural craft from his seven-year apprenticeship with Gustav Hanssen and Dietrich Harfst in Davenport. He then left for Chicago where he studied architecture and engineering. Ebeling returned to Davenport in 1908 and began his own architectural practice. He married Bridget "Belle" McCarthy (1878–1968) and together they had four children Arthur, Paul, Mary Alice, and Patricia.

== Architecture ==
The Arthur Ebeling House is a two-story residence utilizing a rectilinear plan. It features a hipped roof covered in red clay tiles, a full-length front porch, and an entrance vestibule in the back of the house. The exterior is covered in pink-tan face-brick laid in a stretcher bond pattern. The window sills, water table, and quoins are concrete slabs. The façade is symmetrical with three bays. The porch roof is supported by brick piers with concrete caps. The balustrade is solid brick and features panels with a lions' head reliefs on both sides. The main entrance is framed by sidelights.

== Projects ==
Besides his own home Arthur Ebeling designed, or was involved with, the following notable buildings:

- Walsh Flats/Langworth Building in Davenport (1910)
- August F. Martzahn House in Davenport (1911)
- Northwest Davenport Savings Bank in Davenport (1912)
- St. Mary's High School, in Riverside, Iowa (1912)
- St. Alphonsus Catholic Church in Davenport (1913; Supervising architect)
- St. Joseph's School, in Davenport
- Sickles, Preston and Nutting Company Building in the Crescent Warehouse Historic District in Davenport (1911)
- Dempsey Hotel (1913) and Annex (1914) in the Davenport Downtown Commercial Historic District
- Sieg Iron Company Building in the Crescent Warehouse Historic District in Davenport (1915)
- Blackhawk Hotel in Davenport (1915; Supervising architect)
- Sacred Heart School in Davenport (1915)
- Joseph F. Bettendorf House in Bettendorf (1915)
- Regina Coeli Monastery in Bettendorf (1916)
- Our Lady of Lourdes Church in Keswick, Iowa (1916)
- Kahl Building in downtown Davenport (1920)
- Henry Kahl House in Davenport (1920)
- Buildings at the Mississippi Valley Fairgrounds in Davenport (1920)
- Washington School in Bettendorf, Iowa (1923; addition to original structure)
- East Hill House and Carriage House in Riverdale, Iowa (1926; Supervising architect)
- St. Joseph's School in Fort Madison, Iowa (1926)
- Davis Hall, St. Ambrose University in Davenport (1927)
- Holy Cross Lutheran Church in Davenport (1927)
- Buffalo High School in Buffalo, Iowa (1928; addition to original structure)
- Lewis Hall, St. Ambrose University in Davenport (1929)
- Madison Elementary School in Davenport (1940)
- Scott County Courthouse in Davenport (1956)
