= Donahue (disambiguation) =

Donahue is a surname. It may also refer to:

- The Phil Donahue Show, also known as Donahue, an American television talk show aired from 1970 to 1996
- Donahue (2002 talk show), a short-lived talk show also hosted by Phil Donahue
- Donahue, Iowa, a small city in the United States
- Donahue Building, Davenport, Iowa, on the National Register of Historic Places
- R. Donahue Peebles (born 1960), African-American real estate entrepreneur, author, commentator and political activist

== See also ==
- Bishop Donahue Memorial High School, a private Catholic high school in McMechen, West Virginia, United States
