= Joseph Chabanceau de La Barre =

French composer

Joseph Chabanceau de La Barre (21 May 1633, in Paris – 6 May 1678, in Paris) was a French composer, notably of the air de cour.

He was son of Pierre Chabanceau de La Barre (1592–1656), organist of the chapelle royale at Notre-Dame, sieur of La Barre, and younger brother of Charles-Henry Chabanceau de La Barre (1625-?), player of the spinet to the queen, and Anne Chabanceau de La Barre (1628–1688), a noted soprano.

He received the pension as an abbé in 1674 only four years prior to his death.

== Works, editions and recordings ==
- Airs à deux parties avec les seconds couplets en diminution, Robert Ballard, and son Christophe Ballard, Paris 1669
- four pieces in the Bauyn Manuscript (Paris, Bibliothèque Nationale. Catalogue number Rés. Vm7 674–675)
- various airs published in journals such as the Mercure galant and collections.

Recording

- Airs à deux parties Stephan Van Dyck, Stephen Stubbs, Ricercar Belgium, 1998.
