= Anne Chabanceau de La Barre =

French opera singer

- Born: July 3, 1628
- Origin: France
- Died: March 7, 1688 (aged 59)
- Occupation: Soprano

Anne Chabanceau de La Barre, sometimes given as Anne de La Barre, (July 3, 1628 – March 7, 1688) was a French soprano of the Baroque era.

== Life and career ==
Anne Chabanceau de La Barre was born in Paris, France on July 3, 1628. She was the daughter of Pierre Chabanceau de La Barre (1592-1656), organist of the chapelle royale at Notre-Dame, sieur of La Barre, and sister of Joseph Chabanceau de La Barre (1633-1678), composers of airs.

Anne made her debut in opera in 1647 in Orfeo by Luigi Rossi. Between 1652 and 1654, she travelled widely in Northern Europe, and sang at the court of Queen Christina of Sweden in Stockholm for some time. She was made kammarsångerska, singer of the royal court in 1653-1654, alongside her brother Joseph (1633–78) who was court singer in 1650-1654. She later appeared at the court of Denmark.

Back in France, she sang in several "comédie-ballets" by Jean-Baptiste Lully such as Galanterie du Temps, Alcidiane, La Raillerie, and La Princesse d'Élide. She took part in the creation of Ercole amante by Francesco Cavalli in 1662, during the composer's stay in France.

In 1661, she was named "fille ordinaire de la musique de la Chambre du Roi", meaning roughly a member of the king's private music ensemble (or court soprano), a very prestigious post that she kept until her death. In 1667, she married Antoine Coquerel, and ended her stage career.

== Painting rediscovered ==
In 2024, a painting (a fine lady holding a music score by Adriaen Hanneman 165(7)) was identified to portray Anne de La Barre, marking the first known portrait of her. The identification was made possible through several clues within the painting itself.
