= East Hill House and Carriage House =

Historic house in Iowa, United States

- U.S. National Register of Historic Places
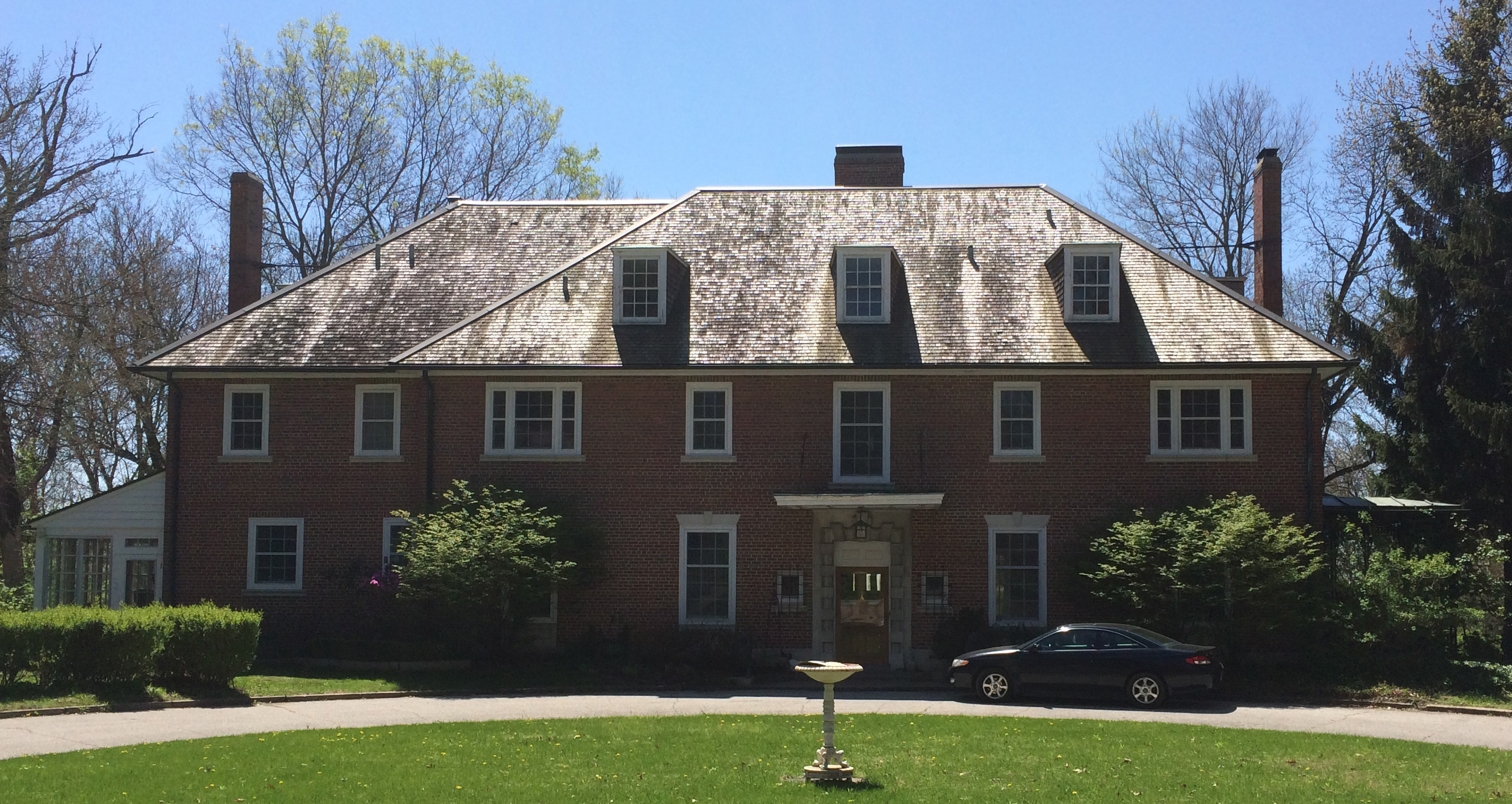

- Location within Iowa Location within the United States
- Location: 5004 State St. Riverdale, Iowa
- Coordinates: 41°32′36″N 90°28′1″W
- Area: 3 acres (1.2 ha)
- Built: 1926
- Architect: Howard Van Doren Shaw; Arthur H. Ebeling
- Architectural style: Georgian Revival
- NRHP reference No.: 99001384
- Added to NRHP: November 22, 1999

The East Hill House and Carriage House, also known as the Decker French Mansion, is a historic property located in Riverdale, Iowa, United States. The Georgian Revival style residence and its carriage house have been listed on the National Register of Historic Places since 1999. The historic listing includes two contributing buildings, one structure and one site.

== History ==
The estate was built for the George W. "Decker" French family, who were part of the Iowana dairy farms that raised prize Holstein cattle. The family named the house "East Hill House" to differentiate it from the larger home built for them on a hill to the west of this property in 1909 that became known as "West Hill House". The family also used these names on their stationery. East Hill House was designed by noted Chicago architect Howard Van Doren Shaw. About the same time, the family donated French Hall for nurses at St. Lukes Hospital in Davenport, no longer extant, and hired Shaw to design that building as well. Davenport architect Arthur Ebeling was the supervising architect during the construction phase of the project. He is noted locally as the architect for the Joseph Bettendorf House (1915), Regina Coeli Monastery (1916), and the Henry Kahl House (1920).

== Architecture ==
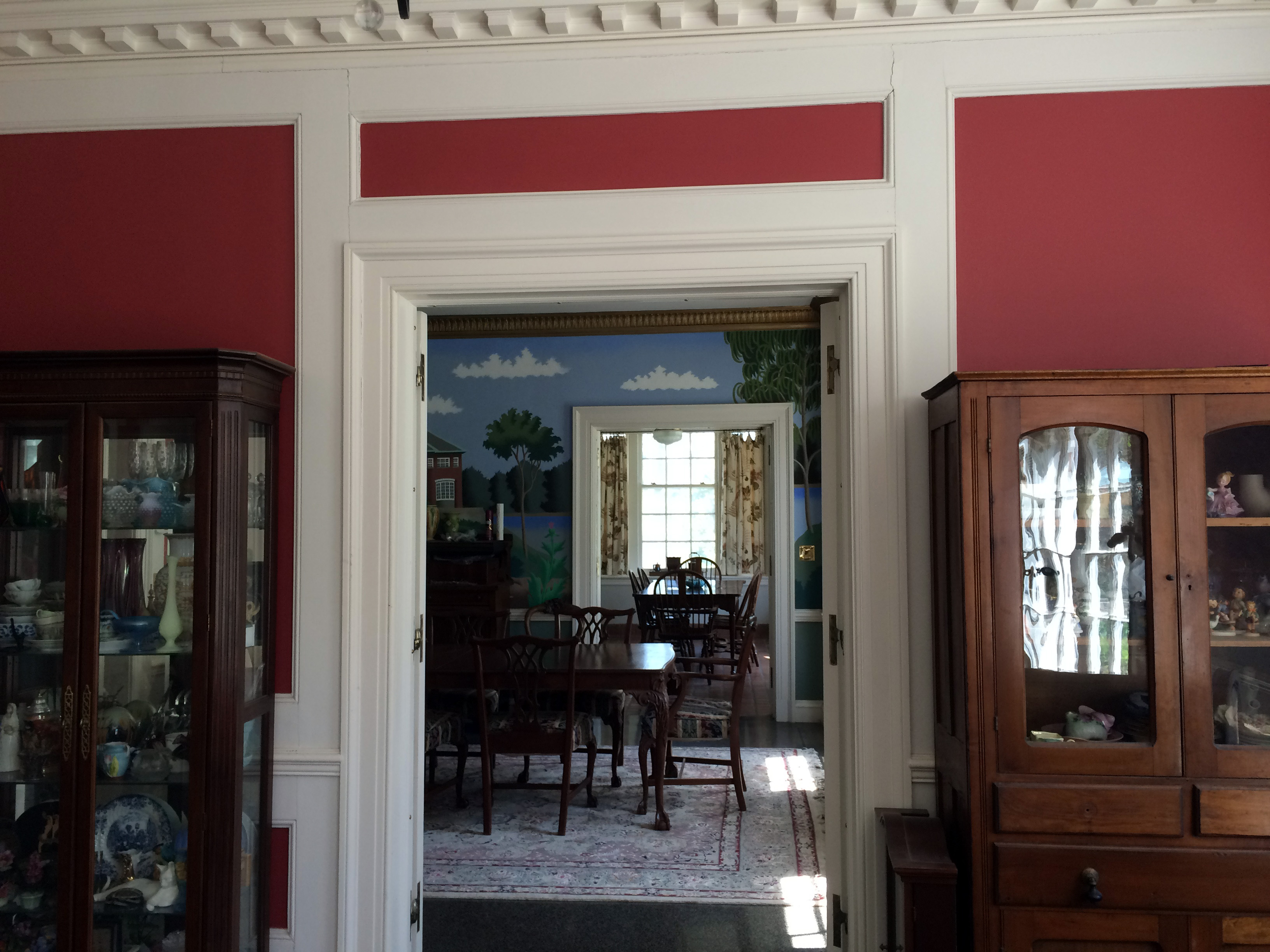
East Hill House inside view from Living Room through dining room to breakfast room.

East Hill House is a three-story, brick Georgian Revival mansion. It was built just beyond Riverdale, which is essentially a middle-class subdivision. The house features a vertically symmetrical main block with a small wing on the east side and a large porch on the west side. It is capped with a steep hipped roof that has four dormers on the south side and three dormers on the north. On its front facade the main block is five bays wide and the east wing is two bays wide.

The house is surrounded by approximately 20 acres (8.1 ha) of woodlands. Immediately surrounding the house is 3 acres (1.2 ha) of lawn that is planted with large oaks, maples, and pines. A formal garden, which is considered the contributing site, is located behind the house and it includes a fishpond and stone walkways that are enclosed by a stone wall. All of the landscaping was a part of the original design for the estate.

The carriage house, built at the same time as the main house, is the second contributing building. It reflects the main house in both design and material. The two-story structure has three garage bays. The center bay has large barn-style sliding doors and is flanked by two bays with hinged doors. The second level of the carriage house is a two-bedroom apartment with a bathroom, kitchen, hall and living room. The French family's chauffeur and his family lived in the apartment. An enclosed porch is located on the south side of the carriage house. The structure has two separate basements, one under the house and the other is located under the porch and housed the old boiler.

A concrete tennis court is located north of the carriage house and is a contributing structure. It is surrounded by a fence and trees. The French family would flood the court in the winter and use it as an ice skating rink.
