= Blue Top Ridge Golf Course =

Coordinates: 41°29′50.32″N 91°32′3.67″W

Blue Top Ridge Golf Course is a golf course in Riverside, Iowa. It is partnered with Iowa PGA and hosts the Iowa Open. The course was damaged in floods in 2009. It reopened in 2011. The course is around 7,400 yards (6,800 m) long and has a par of 72. Golfweek ranked it as the second best golf course in Iowa.
