= Riverside, Iowa =

- City
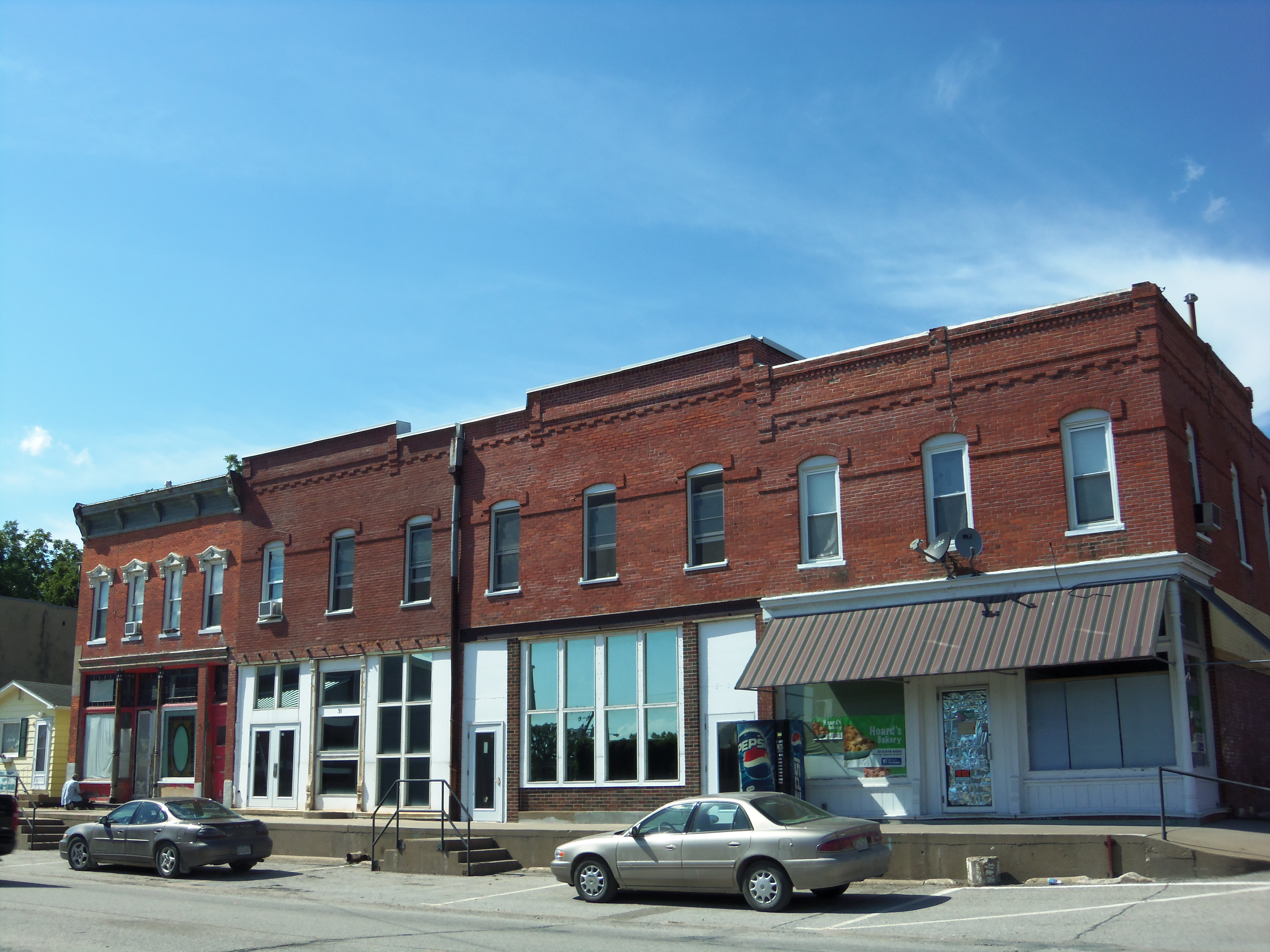
- Riverside's Downtown District
- Motto: Where the Trek Begins
- Location of Riverside, Iowa
- Coordinates: 41°29′53″N 91°32′12″W
- Country: United States
- State: Iowa
- County: Washington

Government
  - Mayor: Allen Schneider

Area
  - Total: 1.85 sq mi (4.78 km^{2})
  - Land: 1.85 sq mi (4.78 km^{2})
  - Water: 0 sq mi (0.00 km^{2})
- Elevation: 689 ft (210 m)

Population (2020)
  - Total: 1,060
  - Density: 574.1/sq mi (221.67/km^{2})
- Time zone: UTC-6 (Central (CST))
  - Summer (DST): UTC-5 (CDT)
- ZIP code: 52327
- Area code: 319
- FIPS code: 19-67440
- GNIS feature ID: 2396384
- Website: riversideiowa.gov

Riverside is a city in rural Washington County, Iowa, United States, along the English River on Iowa Highway 22. It is part of the Iowa City metropolitan area. The population was 1,060 at the time of the 2020 census. It is part of the Highland Community School District.

Riverside proclaimed itself the future birthplace of Captain James T. Kirk, a fictional character from the science fiction series Star Trek, with the agreement of series creator Gene Roddenberry. Canonically, Kirk will have been born on March 22, 2228.

== History ==
The settlement of Riverside was established in 1872 and incorporated in 1882. The name, suggested by a Dr. Ott, is probably a reference to the townsite's location on the English River.

The Burlington, Cedar Rapids and Northern Railway built a 66 miles (106 km) branch from Iowa City to What Cheer via Riverside in 1879. Riverside was just west of Iowa Junction, where the lines east to Muscatine and north to Iowa City diverged.

== Geography ==
According to the United States Census Bureau, the city has a total area of 1.72 square miles (4.45 km^{2}), all of it land. Riverside is approximately 15 miles (24 km) south of Iowa City along U.S. Route 218 and 30 miles (48 km) west of Muscatine on Iowa Highway 22. Riverside is on the north bank of the English River.

== Demographics ==
Historical populations
Year	Pop.	±%
1880	412	—
1890	608	+47.6%
1900	698	+14.8%
1910	652	−6.6%
1920	667	+2.3%
1930	638	−4.3%
1940	633	−0.8%
1950	631	−0.3%
1960	656	+4.0%
1970	758	+15.5%
1980	826	+9.0%
1990	824	−0.2%
2000	928	+12.6%
2010	993	+7.0%
2020	1,060	+6.7%
Source:"U.S. Census website". United States Census Bureau. and Iowa Data Center; Source: U.S. Decennial Census

=== 2020 census ===
As of the 2020 census, Riverside had a population of 1,060, with 478 households and 276 families residing in the city. The population density was 574.1 inhabitants per square mile (221.7/km^{2}). There were 522 housing units at an average density of 282.7 per square mile (109.2/km^{2}).

0.0% of residents lived in urban areas, while 100.0% lived in rural areas.

Racial composition as of the 2020 census
Race	Number	Percent
White	1,016	95.8%
Black or African American	10	0.9%
American Indian and Alaska Native	0	0.0%
Asian	1	0.1%
Native Hawaiian and Other Pacific Islander	0	0.0%
Some other race	3	0.3%
Two or more races	30	2.8%
Hispanic or Latino (of any race)	19	1.8%

There were 478 households, of which 24.9% had children under the age of 18 living in them. Of all households, 46.4% were married-couple households, 7.7% were cohabiting-couple households, 22.6% were households with a male householder and no spouse or partner present, and 23.2% were households with a female householder and no spouse or partner present. About 42.3% of households were non-families, 34.5% were made up of individuals, and 14.4% had someone living alone who was 65 years of age or older.

There were 522 housing units, of which 8.4% were vacant. The homeowner vacancy rate was 0.9% and the rental vacancy rate was 6.3%.

The median age was 39.4 years. 20.5% of residents were under the age of 18, 5.7% were between the ages of 20 and 24, 28.1% were from 25 to 44, 25.2% were from 45 to 64, and 18.2% were 65 years of age or older. The gender makeup of the city was 49.6% male and 50.4% female. For every 100 females there were 98.5 males, and for every 100 females age 18 and over there were 96.5 males age 18 and over.

=== 2010 census ===
As of the census of 2010, there were 993 people, 435 households, and 267 families residing in the city. The population density was 577.3 inhabitants per square mile (222.9/km^{2}). There were 503 housing units at an average density of 292.4 per square mile (112.9/km^{2}). The racial makeup of the city was 97.8% European American, 0.8% African American, 0.3% Native American, and 1.1% from two or more races. Hispanic or Latino of any race were 1.2% of the population.

There were 435 households, of which 31.7% had children under the age of 18 living with them, 49.4% were married couples living together, 8.0% had a female householder with no husband present, 3.9% had a male householder with no wife present, and 38.6% were non-families. 31.0% of all households were made up of individuals, and 9.7% had someone living alone who was 65 years of age or older. The average household size was 2.28 and the average family size was 2.90.

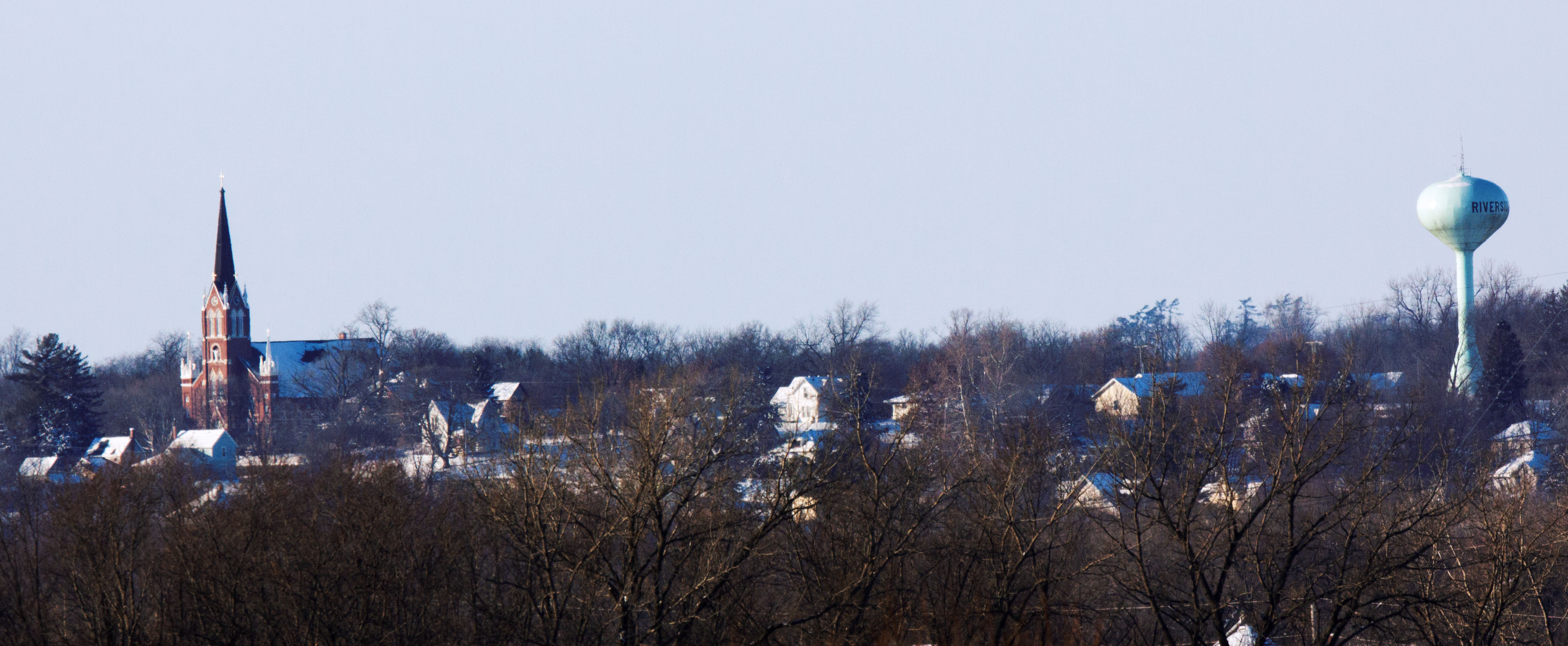
Riverside from the southeast showing the water tower and St. Mary's Catholic Church

The median age in the city was 37.5 years. 24.5% of residents were under the age of 18; 6.3% were between the ages of 18 and 24; 28.6% were from 25 to 44; 27.1% were from 45 to 64; and 13.3% were 65 years of age or older. The gender makeup of the city was 48.5% male and 51.5% female.

=== 2000 census ===
As of the census of 2000, there were 928 people, 378 households, and 249 families residing in the city. The population density was 921.6 inhabitants per square mile (355.8/km^{2}). There were 396 housing units at an average density of 393.3 per square mile (151.9/km^{2}). The racial makeup of the city was 99.00% European American, 0.54% African American, 0.11% Native American, 0.22% Asian, 0.43% from other races, and 0.65% from two or more races. Hispanic or Latino of any race were 0.32% of the population.

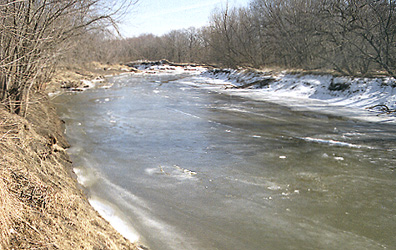
The English River at Riverside

There were 378 households, out of which 34.1% had children under the age of 18 living with them, 55.3% were married couples living together, 7.7% had a female householder with no husband present, and 34.1% were non-families. 30.7% of all households were made up of individuals, and 10.8% had someone living alone who was 65 years of age or older. The average household size was 2.46 and the average family size was 3.08.

27.5% were under the age of 18, 8.0% from 18 to 24, 33.7% from 25 to 44, 19.5% from 45 to 64, and 11.3% were 65 years of age or older. The median age was 35 years. For every 100 females, there were 89.4 males. For every 100 females age 18 and over, there were 91.2 males.

The median income for a household in the city was $41,080, and the median income for a family was $52,344. Males had a median income of $30,526 versus $26,645 for females. The per capita income for the city was $17,744. About 1.2% of families and 2.6% of the population were below the poverty line, including 1.8% of those under age 18 and 8.9% of those age 65 or over.

== Education ==
The Highland Community School District serves Riverside. The elementary school, Highland Elementary, is in Riverside, while the middle and high school are nearby in an unincorporated area.

== Star Trek ==
The USS Riverside

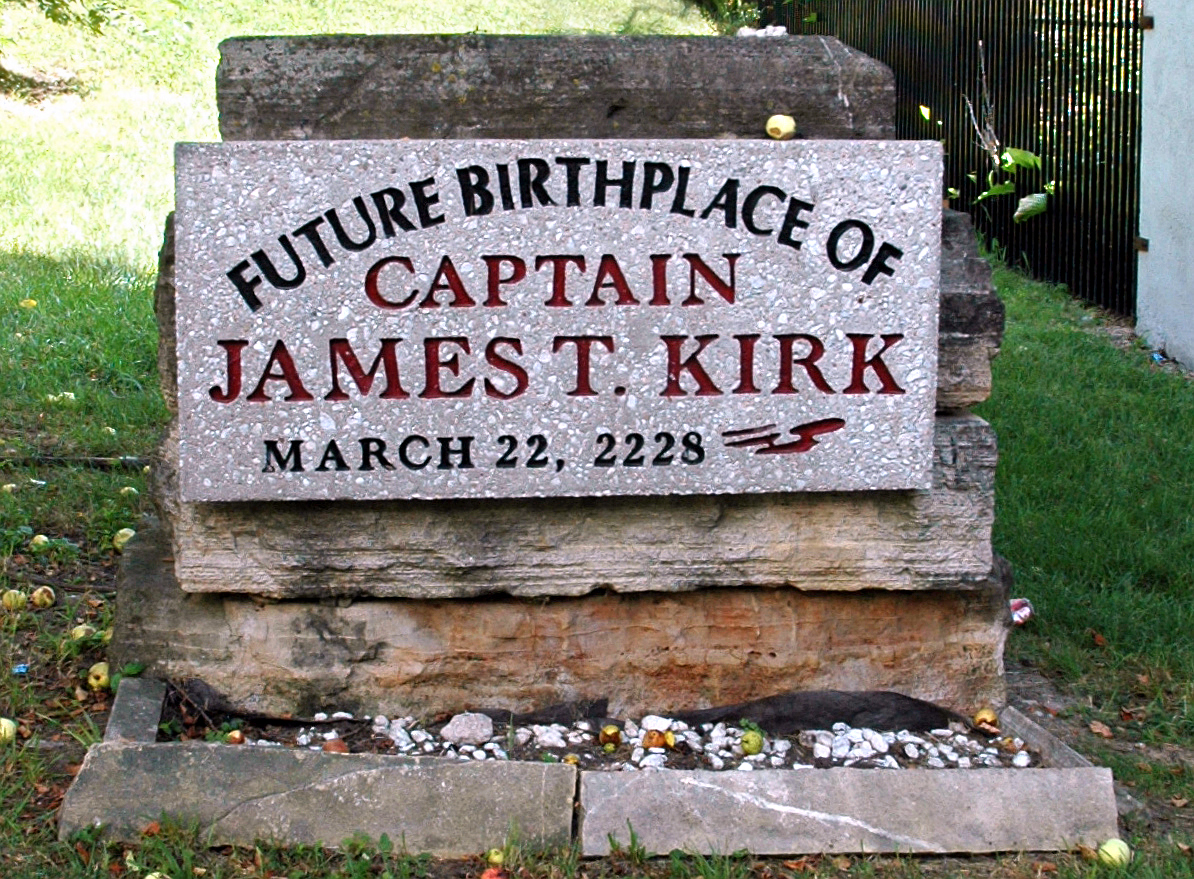
Plaque at Captain Kirk's future birthplace

Gene Roddenberry, the creator of Star Trek, asserts in his book The Making of Star Trek that the character of James Tiberius Kirk was born in the state of Iowa. In Star Trek IV: The Voyage Home, Kirk himself tells Dr. Taylor he is from Iowa.

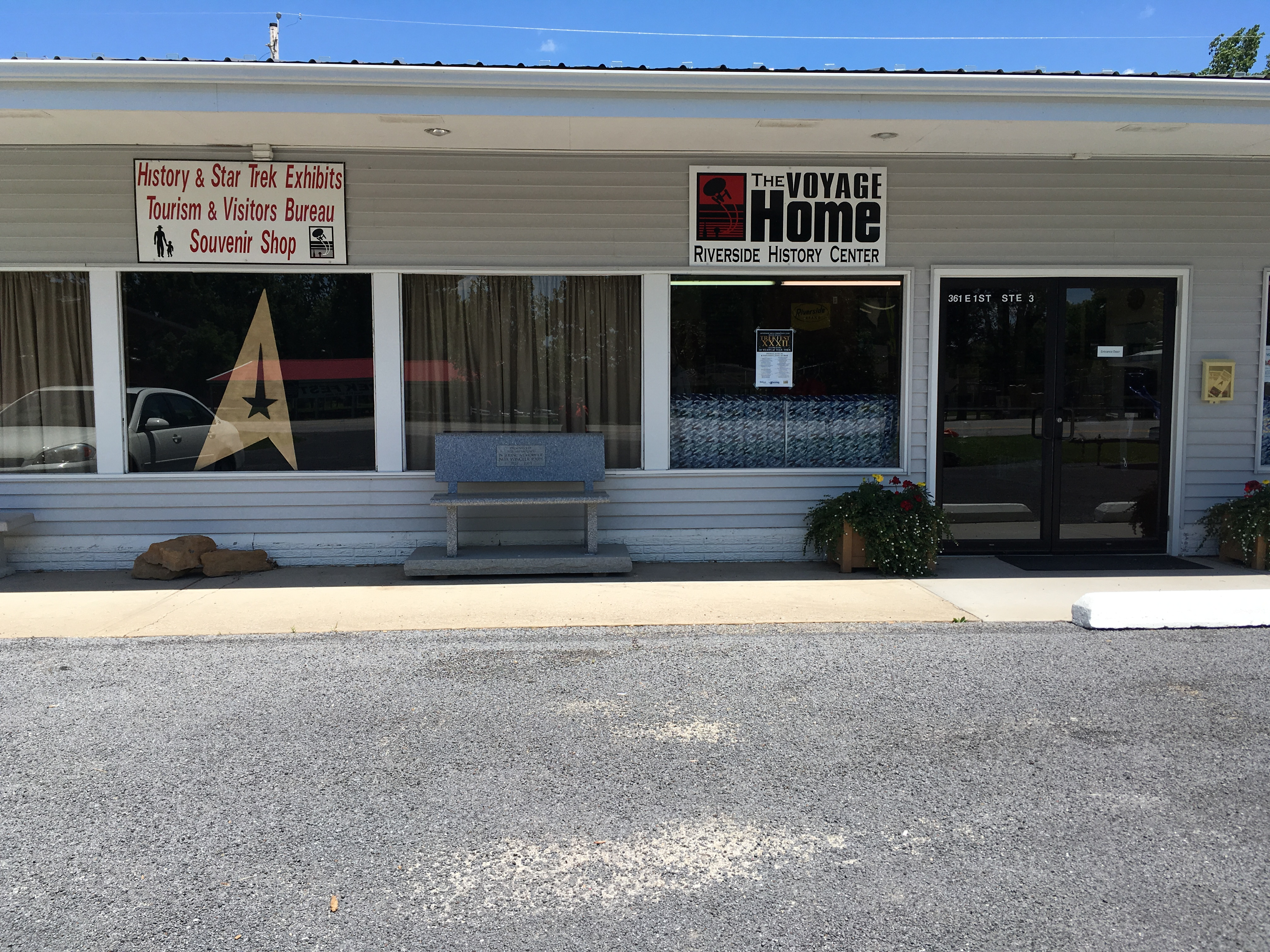
This building in Riverside, Iowa houses The Voyage Home Riverside History Center

In March 1985, when the city was looking for a theme for its annual town festival, Steve Miller, a member of the Riverside City Council who had read Roddenberry's book, suggested to the council that Riverside should proclaim itself to be the future birthplace of Kirk. Miller's motion passed unanimously.

This birthplace was confirmed as canonical in season 2, episode 3 of Star Trek: Strange New Worlds as when asked, Kirk states he was born in Riverside, IA. Additionally, at least two Star Trek novels had material based in the real city of Riverside. Best Destiny, an immediate sequel to the events shown in Star Trek VI: The Undiscovered Country, depicted Kirk's childhood in Riverside. The novel's opening chapter depicts a pre-teen Kirk, playing with friends in fields, in rushes and river wetland along the English River. Another novel, Final Frontier by Diane Carey, not to be confused with Star Trek V: The Final Frontier, was written as a prequel novel to the original series. Depicting the space adventures of James T. Kirk's father, Commander George Samuel Kirk Sr., the opening and closing passages of the novel depict Captain Kirk, now an adult, mulling over his Starfleet career options shortly after his first five-year mission. The younger Kirk was also depicted, walking around the farmhouse owned by his family in Riverside. Its wrap-around veranda had views of both the English River and the Iowa River to the east, which mirror the site of the real "Kirk's Birthstone" marker.

The 2009 film Star Trek, set in an alternate reality from the main Star Trek universe, shows that Kirk was born aboard a shuttlecraft in space and raised in Iowa. Nearby are the (fictional) Riverside Quarry, where young Jim Kirk destroys a 20th-century Chevy Corvette in an act of vandalism, and the Riverside Shipyards, identified by name by Captain Christopher Pike as the construction site of the USS Enterprise (NCC-1701), and an embarkation point for Starfleet Academy recruits, including an older Jim Kirk.

During a September 28, 2004, town meeting, the city learned that its residents had become the unwitting stars of a Spike TV reality show called Invasion Iowa inspired by the Kirk connection. Over a week earlier, actor William Shatner had arrived in the city under the guise of filming a science fiction movie called Invasion Iowa.

=== Voyage Home Riverside History Center ===
The Voyage Home Riverside History Center is also colloquially referred to as the "Star Trek Museum". It houses Star Trek themed exhibits and memorabilia, including a time capsule; a Star Trek-themed bathroom; and an exhibit about the women of Star Trek. The museum features a veterans display and a room dedicated to the history of Riverside. The museum also has displays featuring Leonard Nimoy, the various Star Trek franchise television shows, NASA, William Shatner's visit to Riverside, and others. Walter Koenig, who played Pavel Chekov in the original series, visited the Museum when it first opened on June 27, 2008, where he participated in the ribbon cutting ceremony.

== See also ==
- St. Mary's Catholic Church
- Ticonderoga, New York
- Beam me up, Scotty
- Blue Top Ridge Golf Course
- La Barre, Haute-Saone, the "future" French birthplace of Star Trek's Captain Jean-Luc Picard
- Vulcan, Alberta, which shares a name with Star Trek's Vulcans
- Bloomington, Indiana, the "future" birthplace of Star Trek's Captain Kathryn Janeway and home to a statue.
