= August F. Martzahn House =

Historic house in Iowa, United States

- U.S. National Register of Historic Places
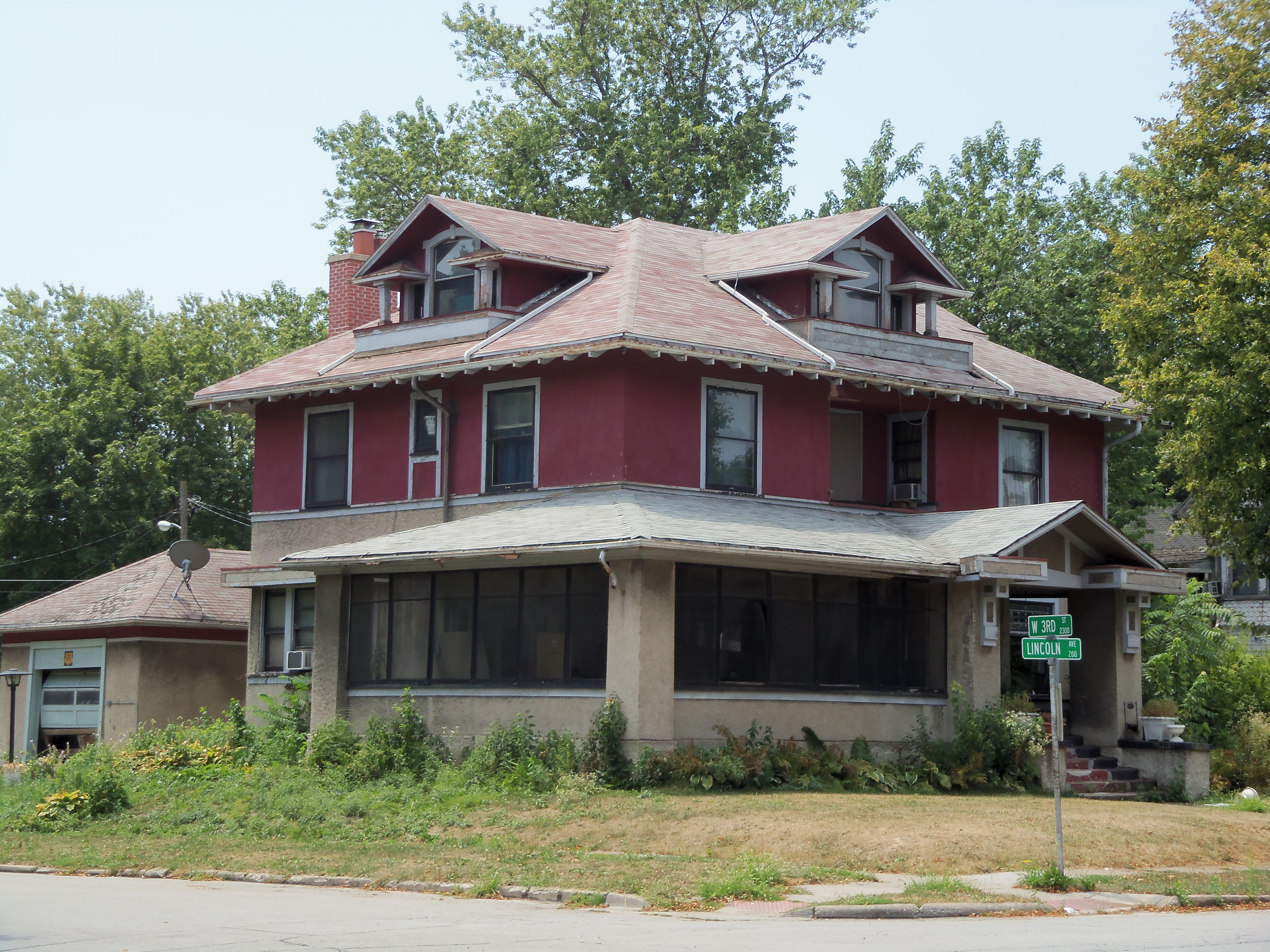

- Location within Iowa Location within the United States
- Location: 2303 W. 3rd St. Davenport, Iowa
- Coordinates: 41°31′20″N 90°36′47″W
- Built: 1911
- Architect: Arthur Ebeling
- Architectural style: Prairie/American Craftsman
- MPS: Davenport MRA
- NRHP reference No.: 83002466
- Added to NRHP: July 7, 1983

The August F. Martzahn House is a historic building located in the West End of Davenport, Iowa, United States. It has been listed on the National Register of Historic Places since 1983.

== August F. Martzahn ==
August F. Martzahn was born in Davenport on January 26, 1861, the son of Fred Martzhan, an immigrant from Mecklenburg and Elizabeth (Beyer) Martzhan. He was educated in the city's public schools and learned the butchers trade. He opened his first shop at 1701 West Third Street when he was still 18 years old. Martzahn organized the Davenport Slaughter & Rendering Company, which was the only such business in the city and became one of the largest in Eastern Iowa. The company's specialty was rendering and dealing in hides. Martzahn married Minnie Schmidt in 1884 and they raised a son. He built this house along West Third Street in 1911.

== Architecture ==
The Martzahn House continued the popular 19th-century tradition of combining several architectural styles into one house. This house combines Georgian Revival mass with decorative elements of the American Craftsman and the Prairie School. Those elements include the two-tone stucco façade, the geometrically patterned leaded glass, the large rectilinear brackets at the main entrance, and the wide eaves with projecting rafter ends. The short posts that support the deep cornice returns on the dormers are also of interest. The house was designed by Davenport architect Arthur Ebeling.
