= La Barre, Jura =

Commune in Bourgogne-Franche-Comté, France

La Barre
- Commune
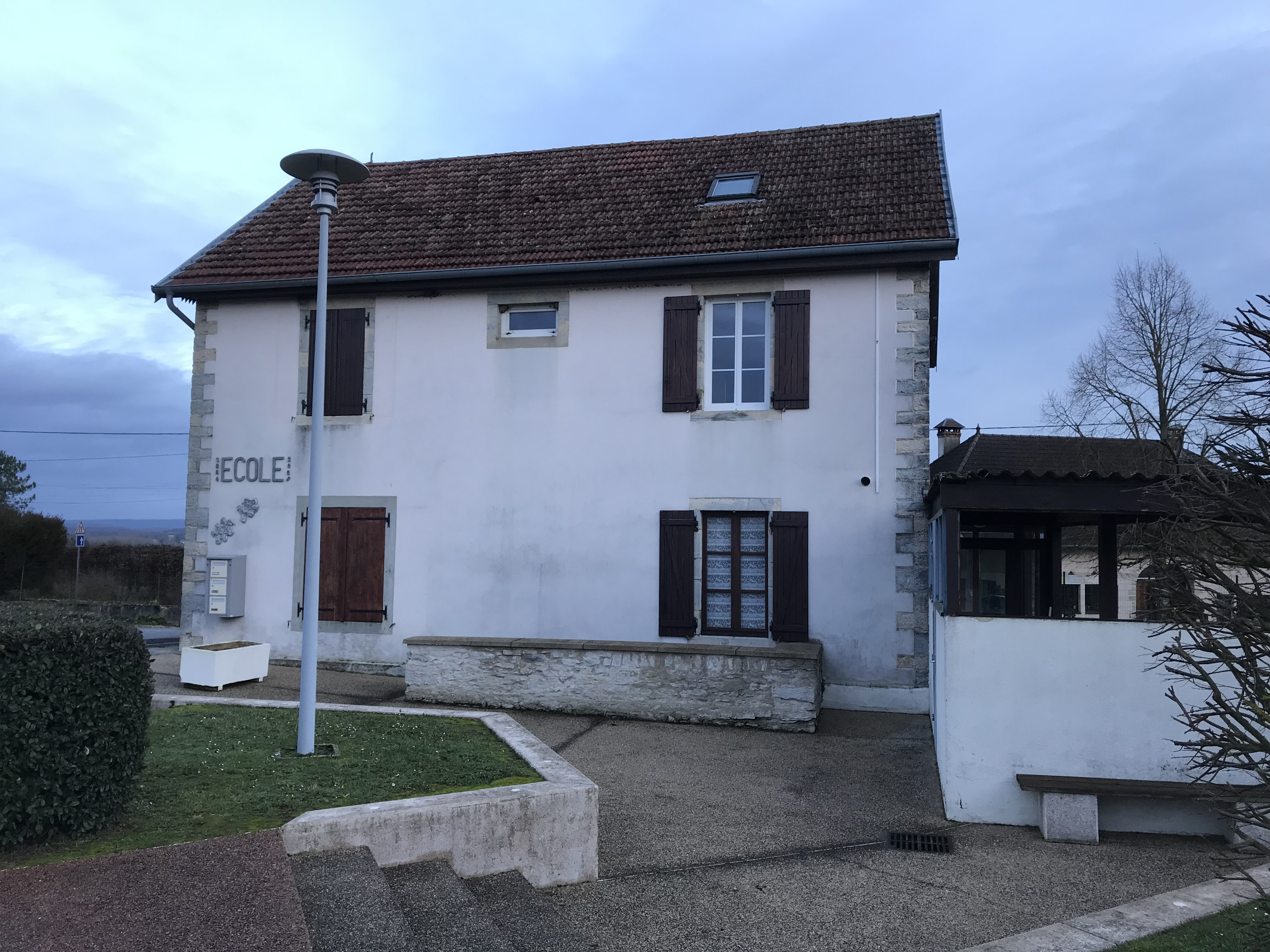
- The town hall in La Barre
- Location of La Barre
- Location within France Location within Bourgogne-Franche-Comté
- Coordinates: 47°08′52″N 5°41′02″E
- Country: France
- Region: Bourgogne-Franche-Comté
- Department: Jura
- Arrondissement: Dole
- Canton: Mont-sous-Vaudrey
- Intercommunality: Jura Nord

Government
  - Mayor (2020–2026): Philippe Gimbert
- Area^{1}: 3.31 km^{2} (1.28 sq mi)
- Highest elevation: 262 m (860 ft)
- Lowest elevation: 209 m (686 ft)
- Population (2023): 236
  - Density: 71.3/km^{2} (185/sq mi)
- Time zone: UTC+01:00 (CET)
  - Summer (DST): UTC+02:00 (CEST)
- INSEE/Postal code: 39039 /39700
- ^{1} French Land Register data, which excludes lakes, ponds, glaciers > 1 km^{2} (0.386 sq mi or 247 acres) and river estuaries.

La Barre (French pronunciation: [la baʁ]) is a commune in the Jura department and Bourgogne-Franche-Comté region of eastern France.

== Population ==
Historical population
Year	Pop.	±% p.a.
1968	184	—
1975	153	−2.60%
1982	158	+0.46%
1990	176	+1.36%
1999	230	+3.02%
2007	233	+0.16%
2012	226	−0.61%
2017	232	+0.53%
2023	236	+0.29%
Source: INSEE

== In fiction ==
The fictional character Jean-Luc Picard – who features in the American TV series Star Trek: The Next Generation (and subsequent films based upon it) as captain of the 24th-century starships USS Enterprise-D and USS Enterprise-E – is described as having been born in "La Barre" on 13 July 2305. The location of Picard's family village was indicated as being in the Bourgogne-Franche-Comté region of France on wine bottle labels seen in the trailer for Star Trek: Picard, released on 23 May 2019. However, as there are two La Barres in this region of France, it is not firmly established that this La Barre is Picard's home village – it could be La Barre, Haute-Saône.

In the tenth episode of the second season of Star Trek: Picard, Picard explains that his ancestors hid weapons in the tunnels of Château Picard during World War II. The La Barre in Jura was closer to the demarcation line between the zone libre of Vichy France and its occupied territory. La Barre, Haute-Saône is further south and well past the demarcation line. The Jura town is also closer to the center of the view in the opening scene of the second episode of the same season, a descent from space towards western France that eventually cuts to the château.

== See also ==
- Communes of the Jura department
