= St. Mary's Catholic Church (Riverside, Iowa) =

- St. Mary’s Parish Church Buildings
- U.S. National Register of Historic Places
- U.S. Historic district
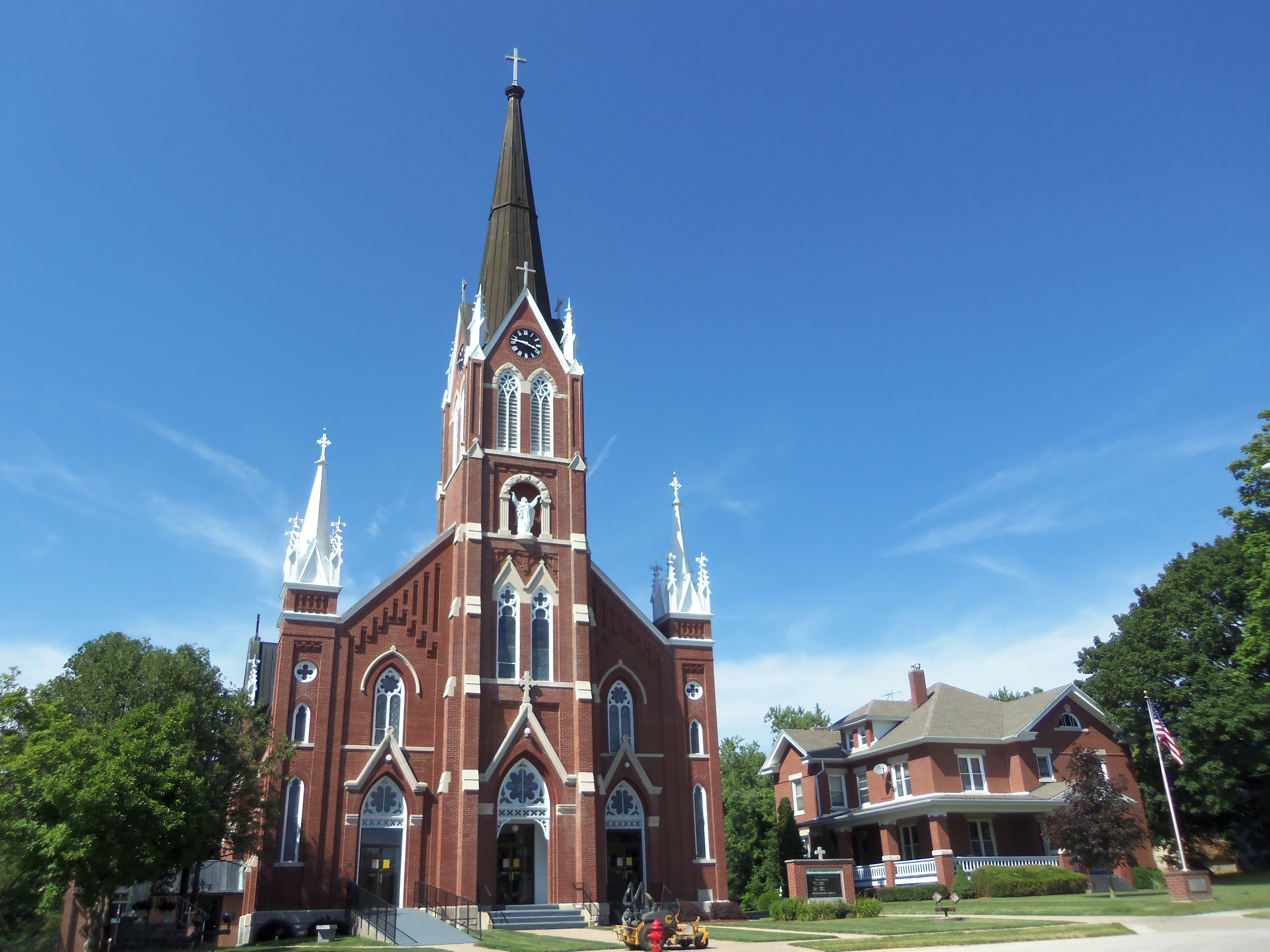
- Saint Mary's Church and Rectory

- Location within Iowa Location within the United States
- Location: St. Mary’s and Washburn Streets Riverside, Iowa
- Coordinates: 41°28′59.94″N 91°34′53.06″W
- Area: 8 acres (3.2 ha)
- Built: 1877 (original church); 1889 (convent); 1907 (church); 1908 (rectory); 1912 (school)
- Architect: Martin Herr
- Architectural style: Gothic Revival
- NRHP reference No.: 79000946
- Added to NRHP: July 9, 1979

St. Mary's Catholic Church is a parish church of the Diocese of Davenport. The church is located at the corner of St. Mary's and Washburn Streets in the town of Riverside, Iowa, United States. The entire parish complex forms an historic district listed on the National Register of Historic Places as St. Mary's Parish Church Buildings. The designation includes the church building, rectory, the former church (now a parish hall), and former school building. The former convent, which was included in the historical designation, is no longer in existence.

== History ==
Catholicism came to the area that would become Riverside in 1846 when the Rev. John Alleman organized a parish named St. Vincent two miles west of the present town of Riverside, near the English River. With the help of the Schnoebelen and Edelstein families, he built a log church and laid out a townsite which was named Strassburg. Riverside was established after the Muscatine Western Railroad built a line in 1872 from Muscatine that passed along the north side of the English River. A small town named Yatton had been laid out south of the river in 1856. The townspeople moved across the river to be near the railroad and joined others in the establishing Riverside. As the number of German and Irish Catholics increased in Riverside it was decided to build a church in town.

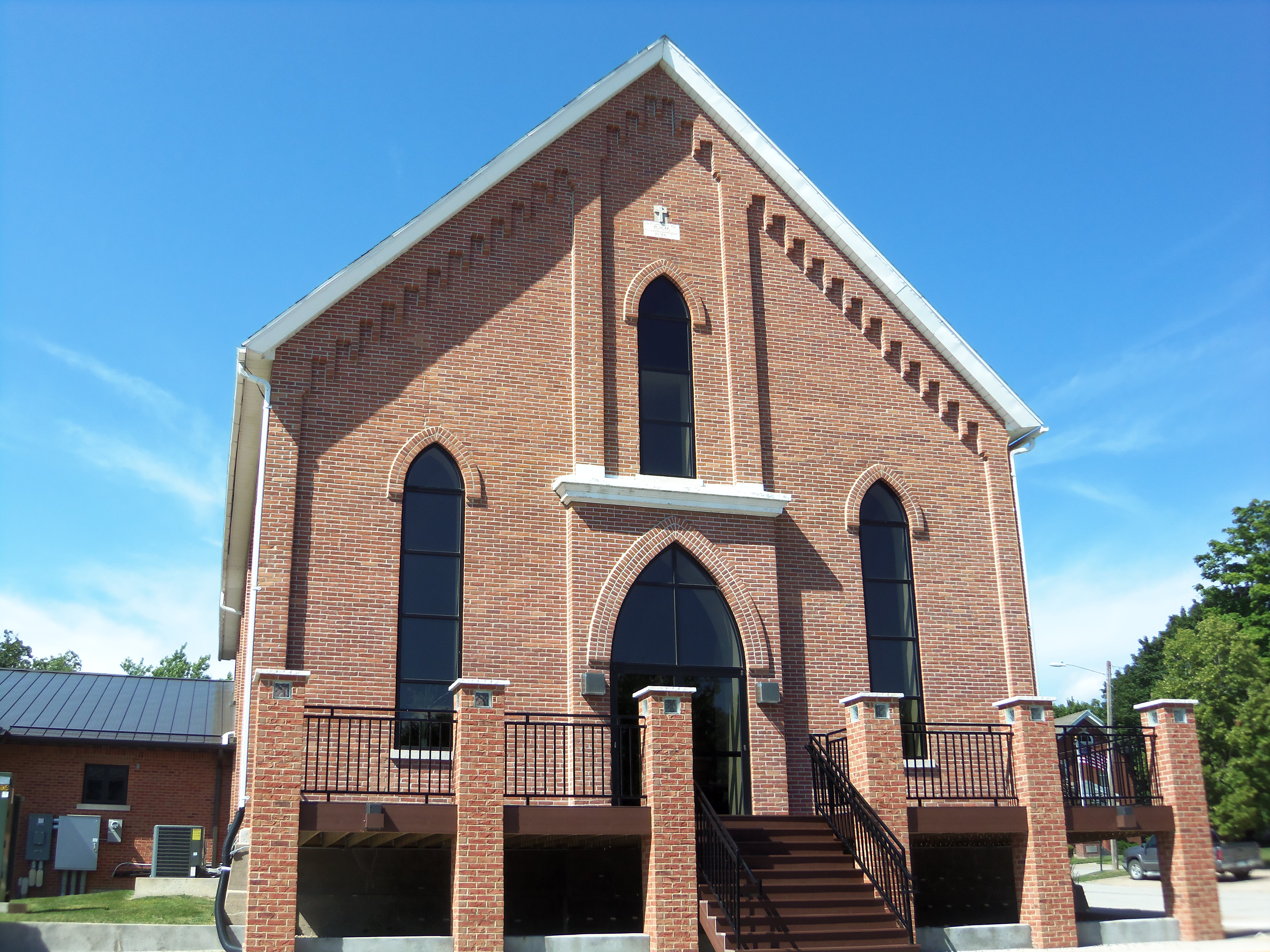
Original church, now part of the St. Mary's Education Center

St. Mary's was established in 1876 with the Rev. William Purcell as pastor. The church building was constructed of brick produced and laid by H.L. Swift. The first Mass in the church was celebrated on Palm Sunday in 1877. At the time the parish was part of the Diocese of Dubuque. It transferred to the Diocese of Davenport when it was established five years later. A rectory was built in the 1880s to the north of the church.

The parish has operated schools at different times throughout its history. The first parochial schools in the area were begun in Richmond, St. Vincent's, and St. Stanislaus. The children from Riverside generally went to Richmond for school, where Joseph Fuhrman was the teacher. The first grade school was started at St. Mary's in 1878 when a committee from the parish convinced Fuhrman to teach there rather than in Richmond, where classes were held under the gallery of the church. The next year classes for St. Mary's School were taught in the Tabernacle, a former Baptist church. When the Rev. A.J. Drexler was pastor, a combination school building and convent was constructed between 1888 and 1889 west of the church. Franciscan Sisters taught in the school from 1889 to 1902. They were replaced by the Sisters of Charity of the Blessed Virgin Mary.

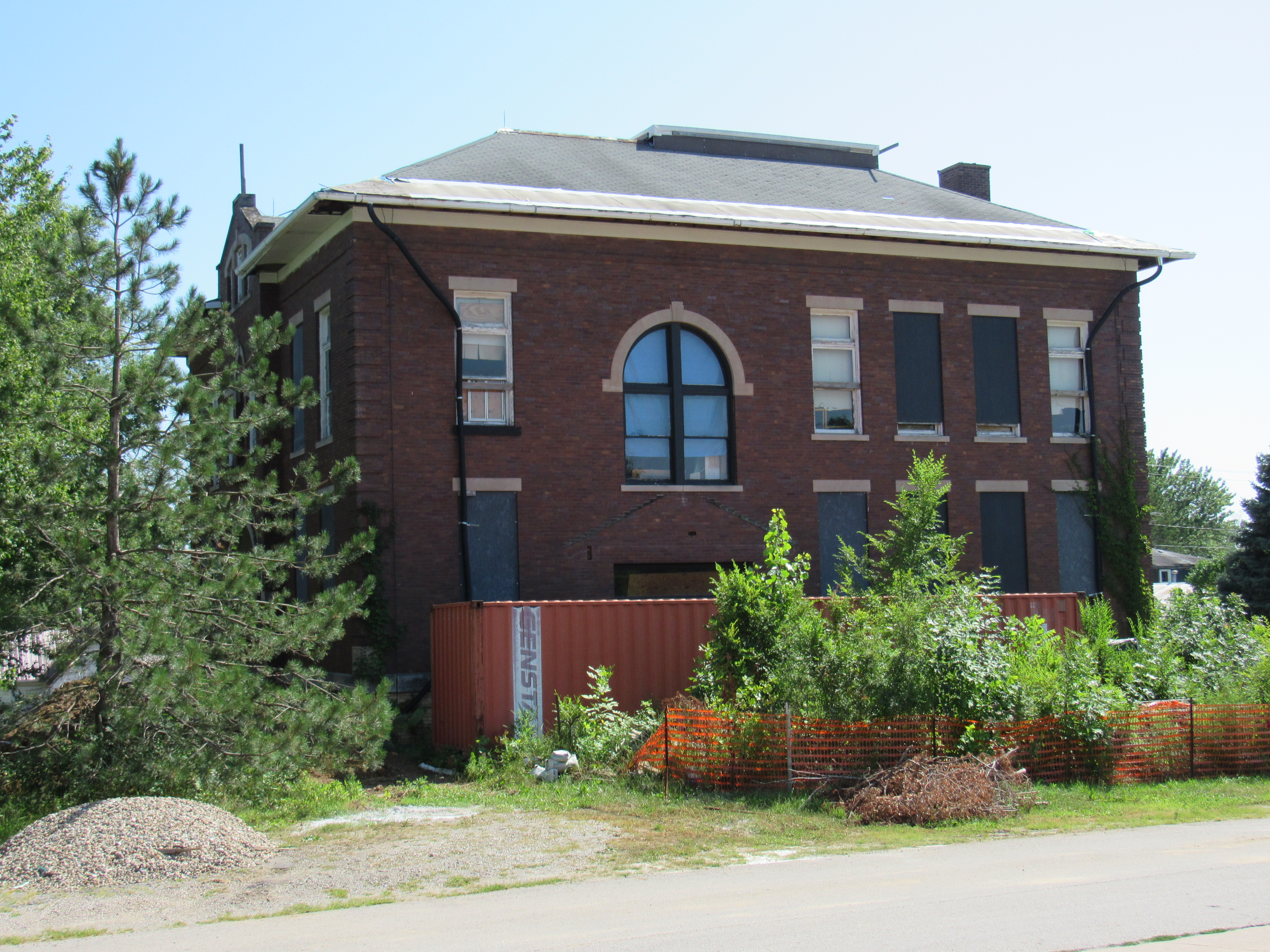
Former school building

The 40-year pastorate of the Rev. Bernard Jacobsmeier began in 1905. He initiated a building program that began with the present church that was begun the year he arrived. It was built on the site of the rectory, which was removed. The original church was converted into a parish hall, and a second floor was added to create an auditorium. The following year a rectory, in matching brick, was built next to the church. The final building to round out the parish complex was a new school in 1912. After it was completed the combination school/convent was remodeled for exclusive use as a convent.

The parish started supporting a high school the same year the new school was built. It was discontinued in 1960. The rest of the school remained in operation until 1969, when the grade school closed for the first time. When the Rev. Thomas Mohr was pastor the grade school reopened in 1978 and in 1980 there were 36 students enrolled in preschool to sixth grade. The Franciscan Sisters of Christ the Divine Teacher from Davenport began teaching in the school in the 1980s. Because of the financial burden and low enrollment, the school closed once more. The parish has subsequently sold the school building and the convent has been torn down and replaced by a parking lot.

Since the late 1990s the parish has been clustered with Holy Trinity Parish in Richmond and St. Joseph Parish in Wellman. The pastor of the three parishes resides in the rectory at Riverside. The basement of the church was renovated into a parish hall during the pastorate of the Rev. John Gallagher. An addition was added onto the original church, now called St. Mary's Hall, and it too was renovated creating the St. Mary's Education Center when the Rev. Richard Adam was the pastor.

== Architecture ==
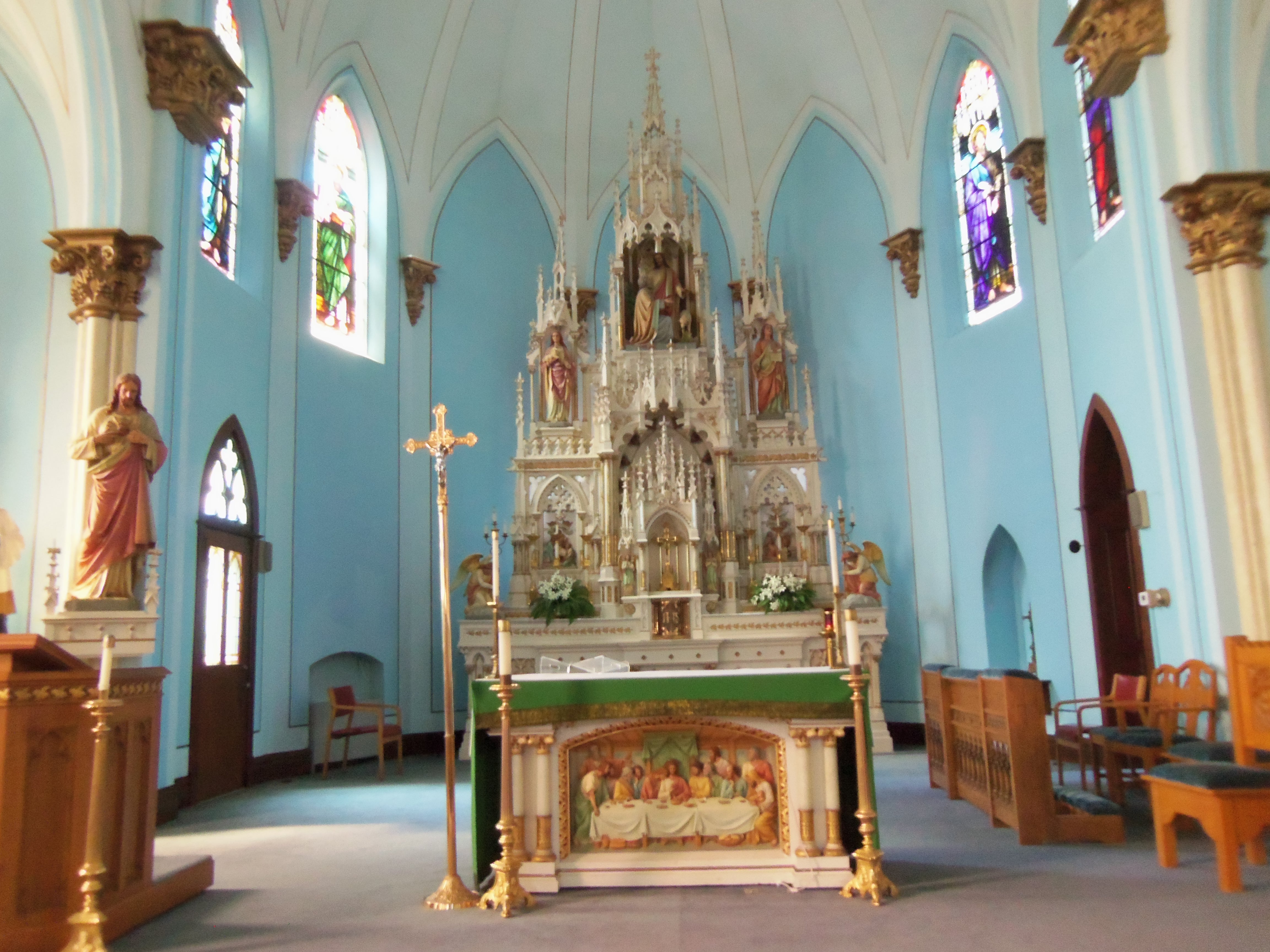
Church interior

The current church building (1907) is built of red brick in the Gothic Revival style. The structure follows a basilica plan with what appears to be transept wings on the exterior, however, they are not true structural features. The main facade is dominated by a tall central bell tower and spire. Each face of the tower has a clock in the gable at the top. Below the bell chamber surrounded by a round arch is a statue of the Blessed Virgin Mary. Two shorter towers capped with pinnacles are located on the corners. There are three entrances across the front with octafoil windows, and above the side entrances are paired round arch windows with small octafoil windows above them. Decorative brickwork is found in the upper portions of the exterior walls. The single nave interior is seven bays in length with a rounded seven-sided apse at the far end. The building contains period stained glass windows, its original wooden altars and a pipe organ. The side altars are located within pointed arch alcoves. Two murals that were painted in oil over the side altars and the Twelve Apostles on the intradoses of the nave arches were completed in 1937. The building was somewhat altered when the basement was remodeled into a parish hall to accommodate an entrance and a staircase between the hall and the main body of the church on the west side of the building. The changes were designed to blend with the original building.

The original church (1877) is a simple version of the Gothic Revival style. It is a front-gable, brick structure that was built on a stone foundation. The side elevations are five bays in length. They are divided by flat brick pilasters, and each bay has a tall lancet window in the center. The main facade is symmetrical and three bays across its width. The main entrance is located within a slightly projecting pavilion. Beneath the eaves is a line of corbelling. At one time the main entrance and the upper portions of the lancet windows were closed while the lower portion of the windows were filled in with glass block. A new entrance with a brick vestibule was created along the east side. A renovation in the early 21st century opened up the main entrance and the lancet windows, which were filled with tinted glass. A modern addition was added to the west side of the building to house religious education classes.

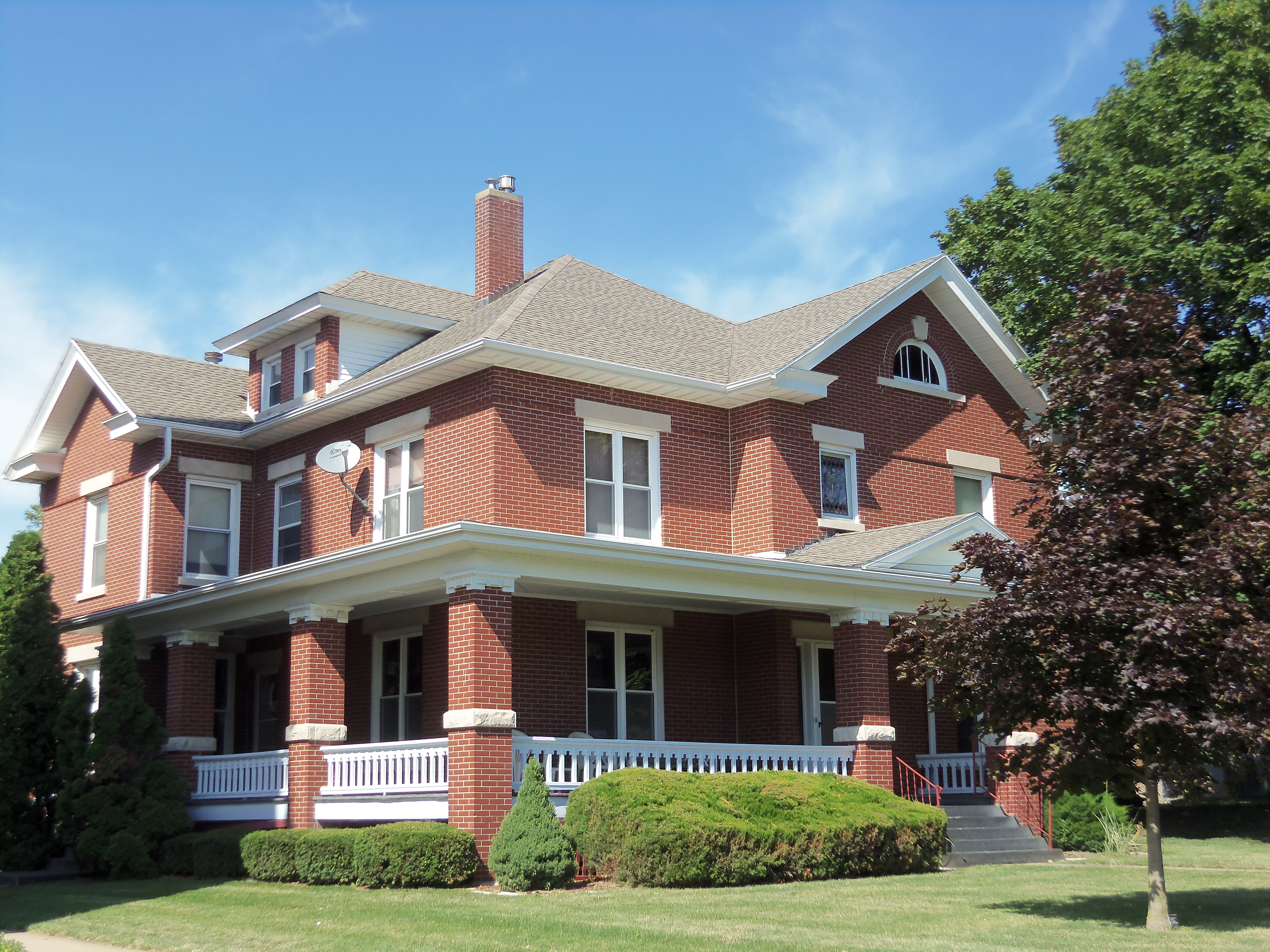
Rectory

The rectory (1908) is constructed of the same brick as the church. The two-story house is capped with a modest hipped roof, intersecting gables with partial cornice returns and a low hipped roof dormer on the west side. A one-story porch wraps around the southwest corner of the house. It features square brick piers, simple wooden spindle balustrade, and a shallow triangular pediment above the front steps. The house's window sills and lintels are concrete.

The school (1912) is a two-story brick structure built on a Bedford limestone foundation. The nearly square-plan building is capped with a low hipped roof and projecting rafter ends beneath the eaves. It features a full-height frontispiece that slightly projects from the main block. The main entrance into the building is recessed in a round stone arch. Above the entrance is a Palladian window on the second floor. On the north side of the building is a secondary entrance located in a small, hipped-roof porch.

The former convent (1889), no longer extant, was a two-story structure that was built of locally produced orange brick. It had a high hip roof with a broad deck that was once edged with iron cresting. The side elevations were six bays in length, and the walls on the south side of the building slightly extended beyond those of the northern half. A cupola was originally located on the southern end of the roof and later removed. The main entrance was also originally located on the south elevation before it was moved to the center of the east elevation.
