= Henry Kahl House =

Historic house in Iowa, United States

- U.S. National Register of Historic Places
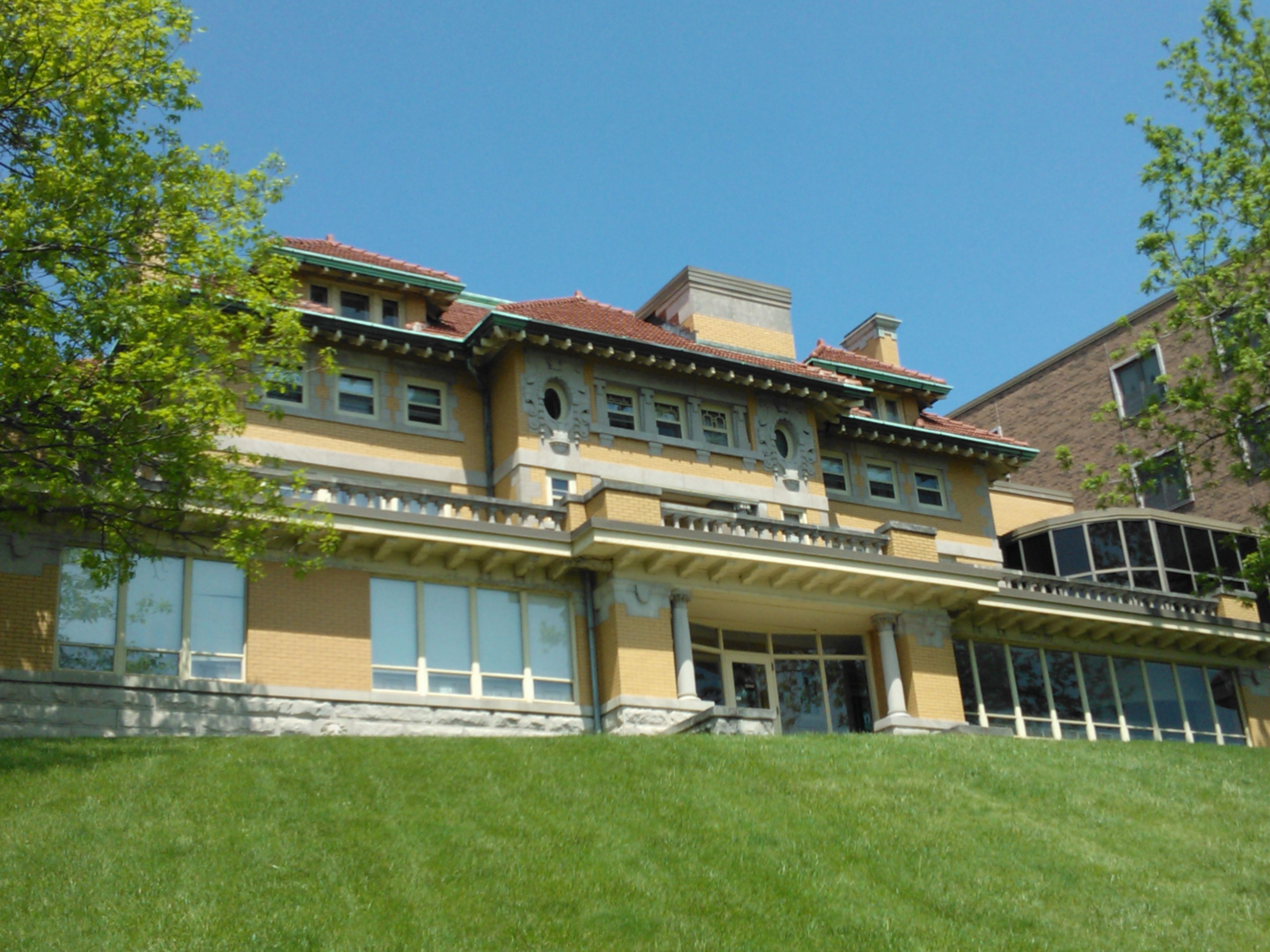
- South facade

- Location within Iowa Location within the United States
- Location: 1101 W. 9th St. Davenport, Iowa
- Coordinates: 41°31′41″N 90°35′18″W
- Area: 5 acres (2.0 ha)
- Built: 1920
- Architect: Arthur Ebeling
- Architectural style: Mission/Spanish Revival
- MPS: Davenport MRA
- NRHP reference No.: 83002457
- Added to NRHP: July 7, 1983

The Henry Kahl House is a historic building located on a bluff overlooking the West End of Davenport, Iowa, United States. What was a private residence was converted into a nursing home in 1955, and a senior apartment facility in 2016. The house was listed on the National Register of Historic Places in 1983.

== Henry Kahl ==
Henry Kahl was born in a small cottage on the northwest side of Davenport. By the age of 12 or 13 he was driving a mule team between Davenport and nearby Coal Valley, Illinois. At 16 he started working for Davenport contractor P.T. Walsh and rose up through the ranks of the company that built railroads across the United States. Eventually he became vice president of the company and oversaw the work on the New York Central Railroad. The company was also known for the tunnel system it built for the Metropolitan Water District of Southern California, which moved water from the Colorado River to Southern California. Other projects included train stations in Buffalo, New York, Erie, Pennsylvania, South Bend, Indiana, a sewage disposal plant in Dayton, Ohio, and the Memorial Bridge in Wilmington, Delaware. By the age of 45 he was a partner in the construction firm and a self-made millionaire, and with his money, he invested in various companies and real estate. He bought property along Third Street in downtown Davenport. On one of the parcels he built the Kahl Building. He died in 1931 at the age of 56.

== History ==
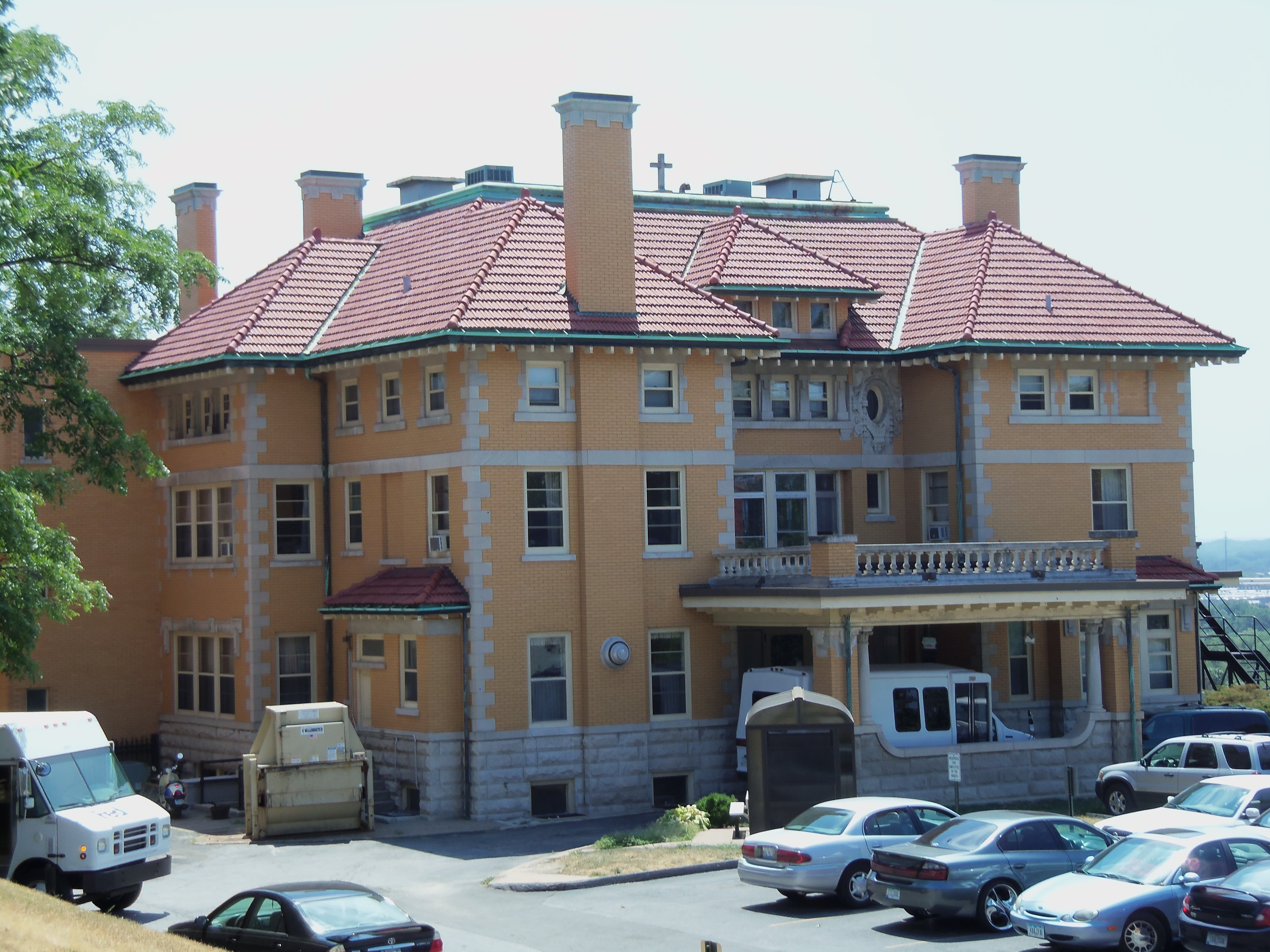
North facade

Henry Kahl had the house built for his family home in 1920. It was designed in the Spanish Colonial Revival style by Davenport architect Arthur Ebeling. He also designed the Kahl Building downtown. Davenport banker V.O. Figge and his wife Elizabeth, who was Henry Kahl's daughter, donated the house and its property to the Catholic Diocese of Davenport to use for charitable purposes. In 1954 Bishop Ralph Hayes invited the Carmelite Sisters for the Aged and Infirm to the diocese and in 1955 they turned the house into a 25-bed, dormitory-style retirement home called the Kahl Home for the Aged and Infirm. Originally, the home housed only women. In 1963 they added a modern building and a chapel onto the main house. This made it possible to care for men as well. A 1987 addition brought the total number of beds to 135. The original house provided living space for the sisters, offices and guest rooms. In 2009 the Sisters announced that they intended to build a new facility on the north side of the city and vacate the central Davenport location. A new $40 million nursing home opened in August 2012 and the old home was vacated.

In October 2013 plans were announced to turn the facility into a 68 unit senior apartment building. The facility was bought by Gold Coast Housing LLC from the Carmelite System Inc. in February 2015. The renovation project began in March of the same year. The rooms on the main floor of the mansion will be renovated and used as public space. The study was converted into the manager's office. The lower-level houses one large apartment, while the second and third floors were converted into two apartments each. The third floor was originally a ballroom that had been converted into 20 bedrooms. The main staircase has also been restored. The 1963 addition has been renovated into 36 apartments, and the 1987 addition into five apartments. The renovation was completed in late 2016.

== Architecture ==
The 3 1/2-story house is composed of cream-colored brick in a combination of the Spanish revival and Mission revival styles. It sits high on the bluff on spacious, terraced grounds. The house remains largely intact even though the east side has been modified somewhat to connect to the main nursing home building. There is a Porte-cochère on the north side of the house, and tall end chimneys with decorative concrete caps at several different locations. Other decorative elements on the houses exterior include Baroque ornamentation surrounding oval windows; a balustraded piazza; and superimposed loggia with columns distyle-in-antis. The entire structure is capped with multiple hipped roofs covered in red ceramic tiles.

== See also ==
- Donahue Building, headquarters building for the Walsh-Kahl Construction Company.
