= Bettendorf–Washington School =

- U.S. National Register of Historic Places
- Location within Iowa Location within the United States
- Location: 533 16th St. Bettendorf, Iowa
- Coordinates: 41°31′41″N 90°30′24″W
- Area: 3 acres (1.2 ha)
- Built: 1909, 1923
- Architect: Charles R. Spink (1909); Arthur Ebeling (1923)
- NRHP reference No.: 84001317
- Added to NRHP: July 12, 1984

Bettendorf–Washington School, also known as the Bettendorf Park Board Fine Arts Annex, was a historic building located in Bettendorf, Iowa, United States. It was listed on the National Register of Historic Places in 1984.

== History ==
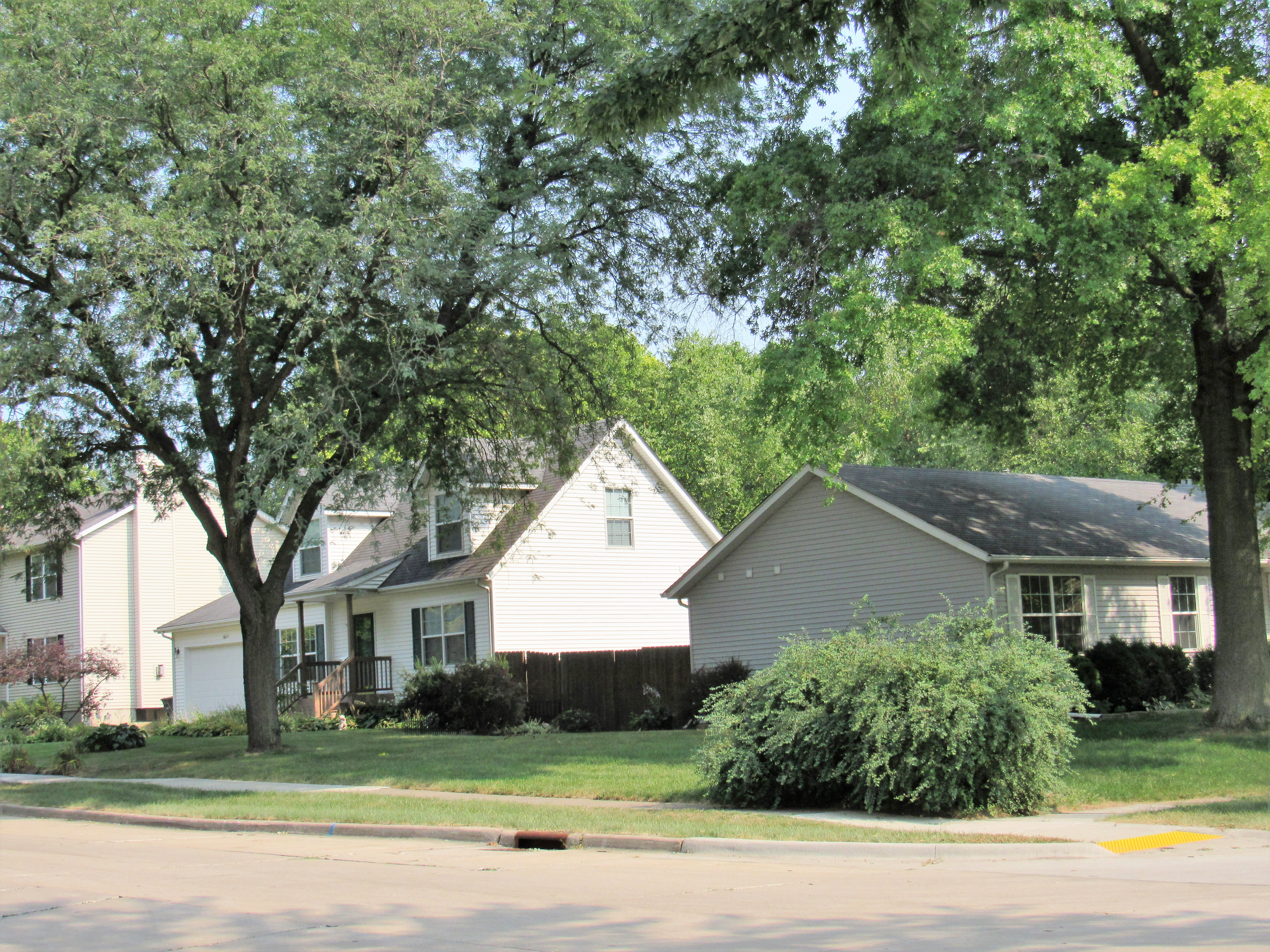
The former school building was located where these houses now sit.

The first school building in what is now Bettendorf was a stone building named the Gilbert School and was built in 1870. It was located near State Street at the foot of 21st Street. Its name derived from its location in the town of Gilbert, as Bettendorf was then known. The town experienced a period of burgeoning growth after its name change in 1903, and it necessitated a larger school building. The citizens of Bettendorf passed a bond referendum in 1908 to build a new school on 16th Street. The property was acquired in 1907 and Davenport architect Charles R. Spink was hired to design the building. It was built in 1909 for $8,500. The new building was called Bettendorf School and housed pre-school through eighth grade. The old stone schoolhouse became a restaurant and bar and became a gathering place for the area's Armenian immigrants.

Three years after the school was built, land was purchased to expand it. Lincoln School was built in Bettendorf in 1917 and this building's name was changed to Washington School. Davenport architect Arthur Ebeling was hired to design an addition to the building and it was built by Ownes and Bevins. The expansion included four classrooms, an office area, as well as electricity and bathrooms, which were not a part of the original building. The seventh and eighth-grade classes were moved to the new Bettendorf Junior High School in 1951 and sixth grade was moved there in 1963. Moline, Illinois architect William F. Bernbrock designed a 1957 remodeling project that included enclosing the stairways, adding dropped acoustical ceilings, and removal of the original slate roof and replacing it with asbestos. Enrollment at the school dropped to 200 students in 1965 and it was down to 120 students when it closed in 1973.

After the building was no longer used as a school it was acquired by the city and became known as the Bettendorf Fine Arts Park Board Annex. It was later renamed the Bettendorf Museum, and then the Bettendorf Children's Museum. It became the Family Museum after its merger with the Center for the Cultural Arts. It has since moved to a different location, and the former school building was torn down.

== Architecture ==
The original two-story structure followed a rectangular plan and had walls of tile and brick veneer. It also had a central pavilion that thrust forward from the north front. The entire building, including the pavilion, was capped with a hipped roof and bracketed eaves. The facade was symmetrical with triple window sets that flanked the pavilion on both floors. The main entry was a central double-door in the pavilion that was flanked with a rectangular transom and tall, thin, square cut rectangular side windows. The exterior was covered with two-color brickwork. The foundation was composed of rust-red colored bricks, and lighter brown bricks on the wall mass. The raised basement and its concrete water table was a darker brick color.

The 1923 addition reflected changing school design from that era, while it attempted to match the lines and design of the original building. It was slightly shorter and had an identical elevation plan. Its main differences were the yellow brick that was used above the foundation level, and it had six-window bands that ran the length of each floor of the building. The rear wall of the addition replicated the rear wall of the original building with the exception of the entrance at ground level, both of the three window sets were vertically aligned, and corner pilasters were added. Rowlock courses and header courses were employed to outline the plain wall masses on either side of the shallow rear pavilion.

An inscription with the school's name, "Bettendorf School," was removed from below the second-floor line in 1917 when its name was changed. The inscription, "Washington School," was removed from the upper pavilion front around 1961. They were both filled in with brick of a different color from the rest of the surface. When the building was adapted for use as a museum it did not lose any more of the building's fabric.
