= Walsh Flats/Langworth Building =

- Walsh Flats/Langwith Building
- U.S. National Register of Historic Places
- Location within Iowa Location within the United States
- Location: 320-330 W. 4th St; Davenport, Iowa
- Coordinates: 41°31′26″N 90°34′41″W
- Area: 1 acre (0.40 ha)
- Built: 1910
- Architect: Gustav A. Hanssen
- Architectural style: Neoclassical Revival
- MPS: Davenport MRA
- NRHP reference No.: 84001582
- Added to NRHP: April 5, 1984

The Walsh Flats/Langwith Building was located in downtown Davenport, Iowa, United States. It was listed on the National Register of Historic Places in 1984.

== History ==
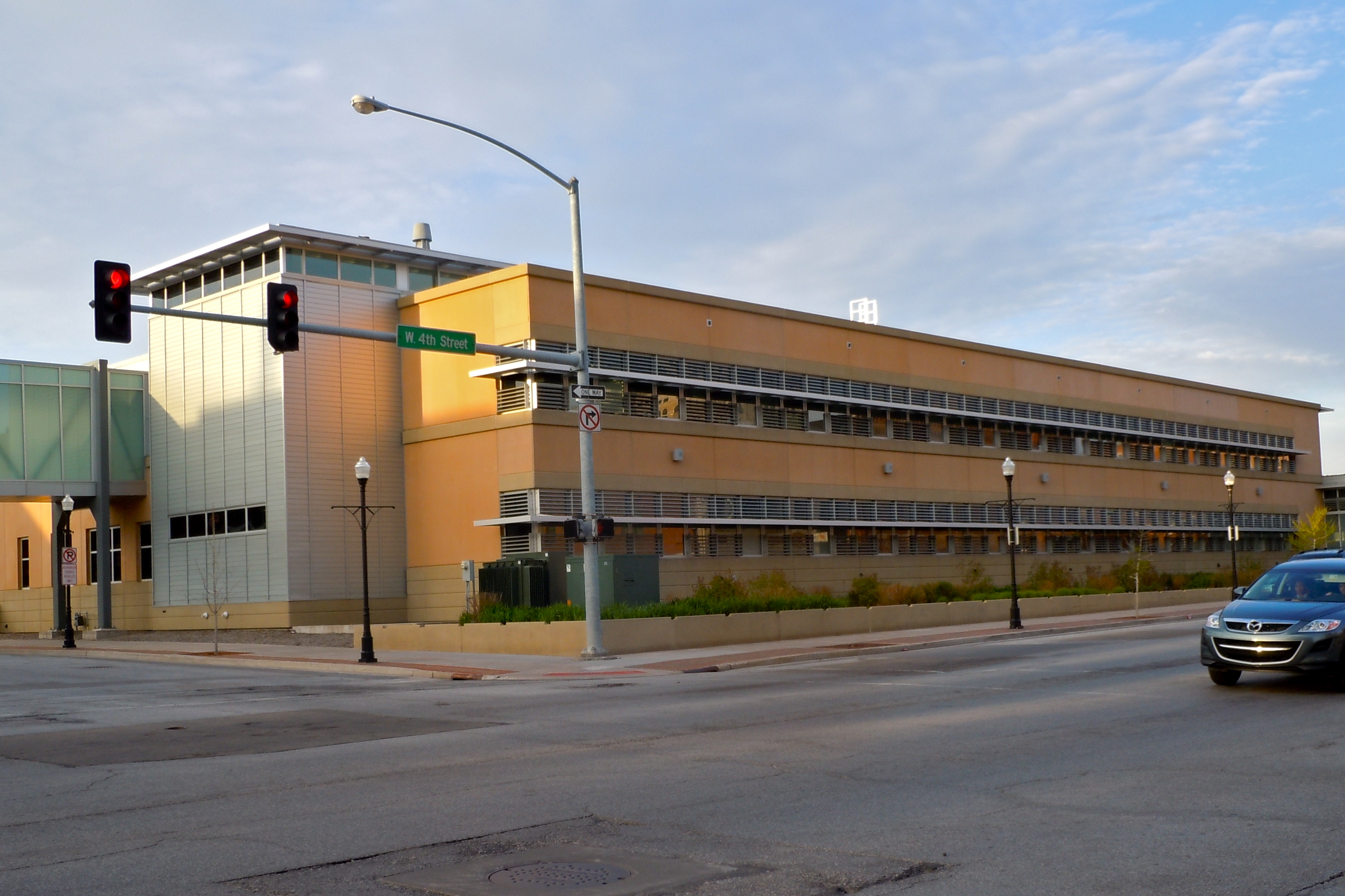
The Davenport Police Department occupies the Walsh Flats/Langworth Building location today

The Langwith Building was a rare combination of automobile showroom on the main floor and apartments located above. The building reflects two new trends in building types that appeared in Davenport at the turn of the 20th century. The first trend was the construction of multiple-family apartment buildings with Neoclassical features and composition. The second trend is the appearance of showrooms for auto dealers and garages in response to the arrival of the automobile.

Walsh Flats is noteworthy as the residence of Dr. C.L. Barewald. Barewald was a Socialist who ran for mayor of Davenport in 1918 and lost by only a few votes. However, two other Socialists, George Peck and Walter Bracher, were elected aldermen from two predominantly German wards. In 1920 Barewald won a significant majority of the votes and was elected mayor. The two Socialist aldermen were also returned to office. His election may have come about because German voters were dissatisfied with the Democratic party's war stance and the Republican party's prohibition stance. During his term in office several public works projects were begun. They include the extension of Kirkwood sewer and the construction of a municipal natatorium on the riverfront. His term in office, however, was marked by office and fiscal upheaval. His policies put hundreds of unemployed people back to work, but his spending to accomplish this was not sanctioned by a fiscally conservative electorate. Barewald and the two aldermen were voted out of office in 1922. The building itself exemplifies Barewald's austere lifestyle and symbolic of the Socialist's populist political stance.

The Warren L. Langwith, Pontiac-Cadillac automobile dealership eventually moved to the north side of the city, but an auto repair shop remained in the back. Walsh Flats-Langwith Building was located between the Scott County Courthouse and Davenport City Hall. Several years after it was torn down the Davenport Police Department headquarters were built on the property.

== Architecture ==
The Neoclassical style building was designed by Davenport architect Gustav Hanssen and completed in 1910. It was four stories tall and the exterior was composed of brick and stone that were placed over a metal frame. It featured a 20-bay main facade. There were four stairhalls that were indicated by two windows and a decorative panel that were grouped vertically beneath a round keystone arch. The stairhalls indicate the four-part arrangement of both the salesroom area and the apartments on the upper floor. Plate glass filled the shopfront fenestration.
