= Donahue Building =

- U.S. National Register of Historic Places
- U.S. Historic district – Contributing property
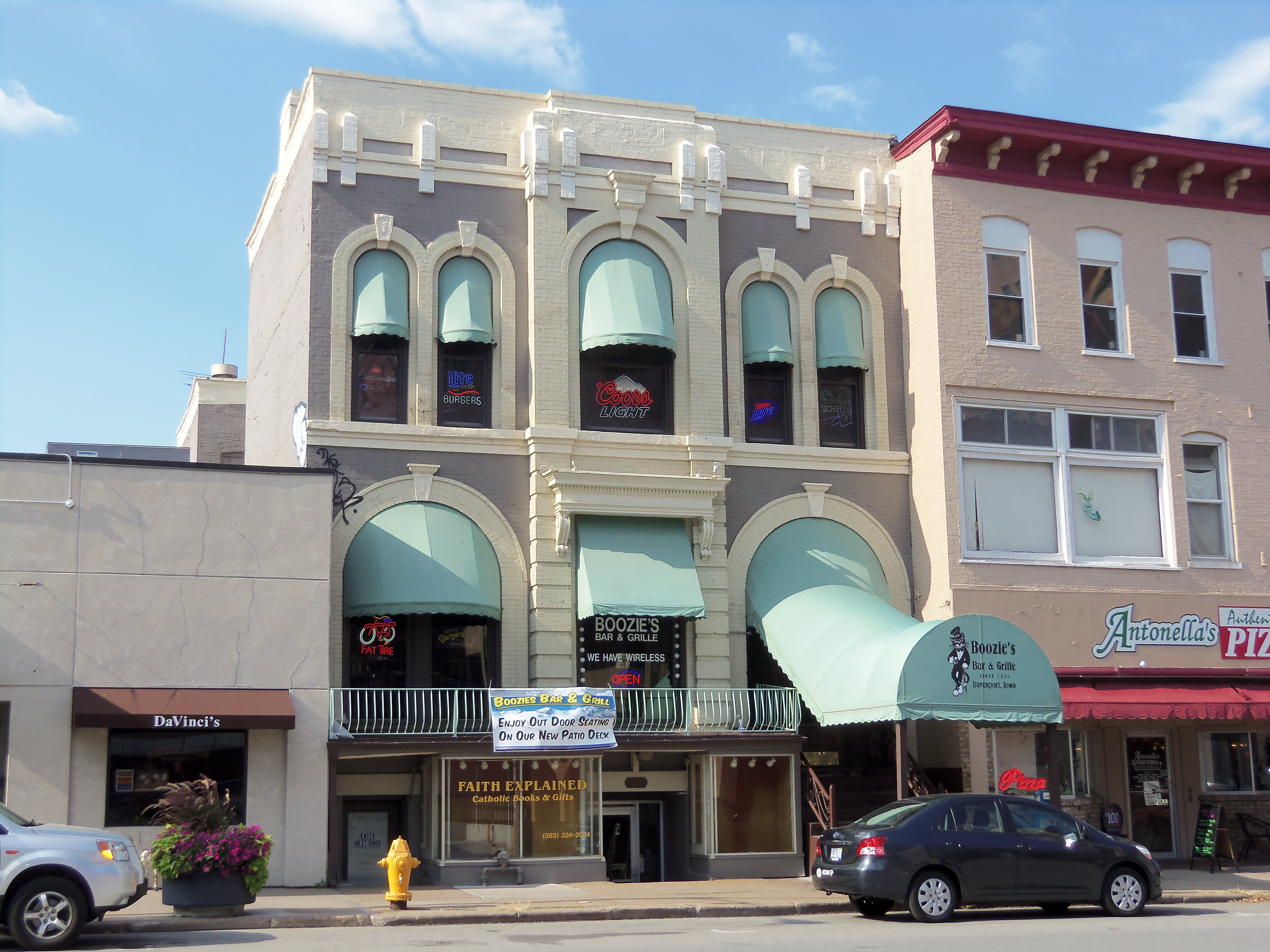

- Location within Iowa Location within the United States
- Location: 114 W. 3rd St. Davenport, Iowa
- Coordinates: 41°31′26″N 90°34′26″W
- Area: less than one acre
- Built: c. 1880
- Architectural style: Renaissance Revival
- Part of: Davenport Downtown Commercial Historic District (ID100005546)
- MPS: Davenport MRA
- NRHP reference No.: 83002423
- Added to NRHP: July 7, 1983

The Donahue Building is a historic building located in downtown Davenport, Iowa, United States. It was individually listed on the National Register of Historic Places in 1983. In 2020 it was included as a contributing property in the Davenport Downtown Commercial Historic District.

== History ==
The Donahue Building was built around 1880 to house the Ed H. Gifford steam laundry. By 1892 the Sanborn Fire Insurance Company lists the property as a Turkish Bath. It was at this time that the Davenport Water Company moved into the building. Michael Donahue organized the company and the building is named for him. By 1912 the Walsh-Kahl Construction Company occupied the building. They were known nationally for their work building railroads. They built Union Station in Buffalo, New York, Penn Station in South Bend, Indiana, and Union Station in Erie, Pennsylvania. Locally, they constructed the Kahl Building and Davenport Bank and Trust. Today it houses Boozies Bar and Grille.

== Architecture ==
The Donahue Building is a three-story structure that is built on top of a raised basement. Both the building and its basement are constructed of brick. When the building was listed on the National Register of Historic Places it was considered an excellent example of Romanesque Revival architecture. It was re-evaluated in 2005 as an excellent example of the Italian Renaissance Revival, which is found in the tall narrow windows with the Roman arch windows and the central projecting pavilion. It is also a rare example in the state of Iowa of a basement level storefront.
