= La Barre, Haute-Saône =

La Barre
- Commune
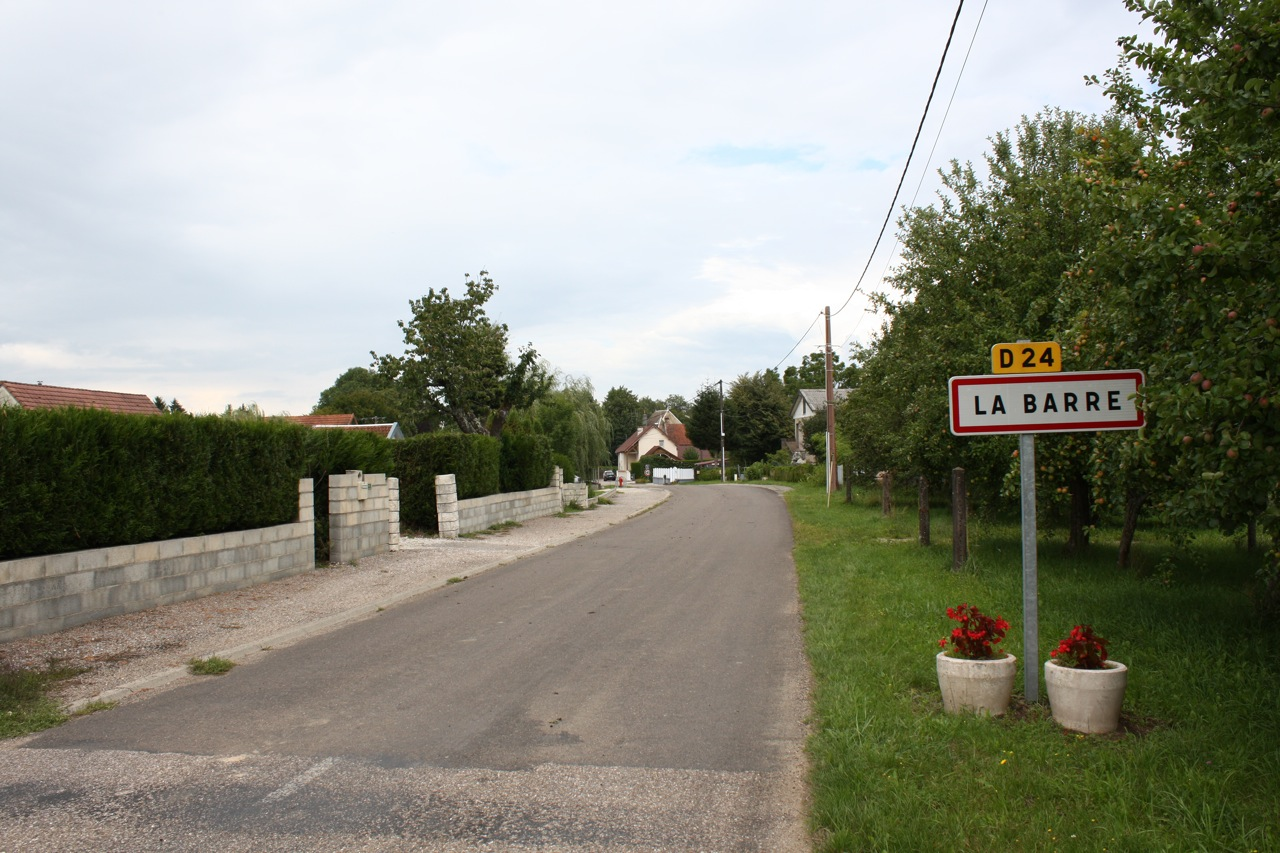
- Southwestern entrance to La Barre on D24 road
- Location of La Barre
- Location within France Location within Bourgogne-Franche-Comté
- Coordinates: 47°24′20″N 6°10′50″E
- Country: France
- Region: Bourgogne-Franche-Comté
- Department: Haute-Saône
- Arrondissement: Vesoul
- Canton: Rioz
- Intercommunality: Pays de Montbozon et du Chanois

Government
  - Mayor (2020–2026): Bernard Pelcy
- Area^{1}: 1.93 km^{2} (0.75 sq mi)
- Highest elevation: 282 m (925 ft)
- Lowest elevation: 227 m (745 ft)
- Population (2023): 95
  - Density: 49/km^{2} (130/sq mi)
- Time zone: UTC+01:00 (CET)
  - Summer (DST): UTC+02:00 (CEST)
- INSEE/Postal code: 70050 /70190
- ^{1} French Land Register data, which excludes lakes, ponds, glaciers > 1 km^{2} (0.386 sq mi or 247 acres) and river estuaries.

La Barre (French pronunciation: [la baʁ]) is a commune in the department of Haute-Saône, in the eastern French region of Bourgogne-Franche-Comté.

== Geography ==
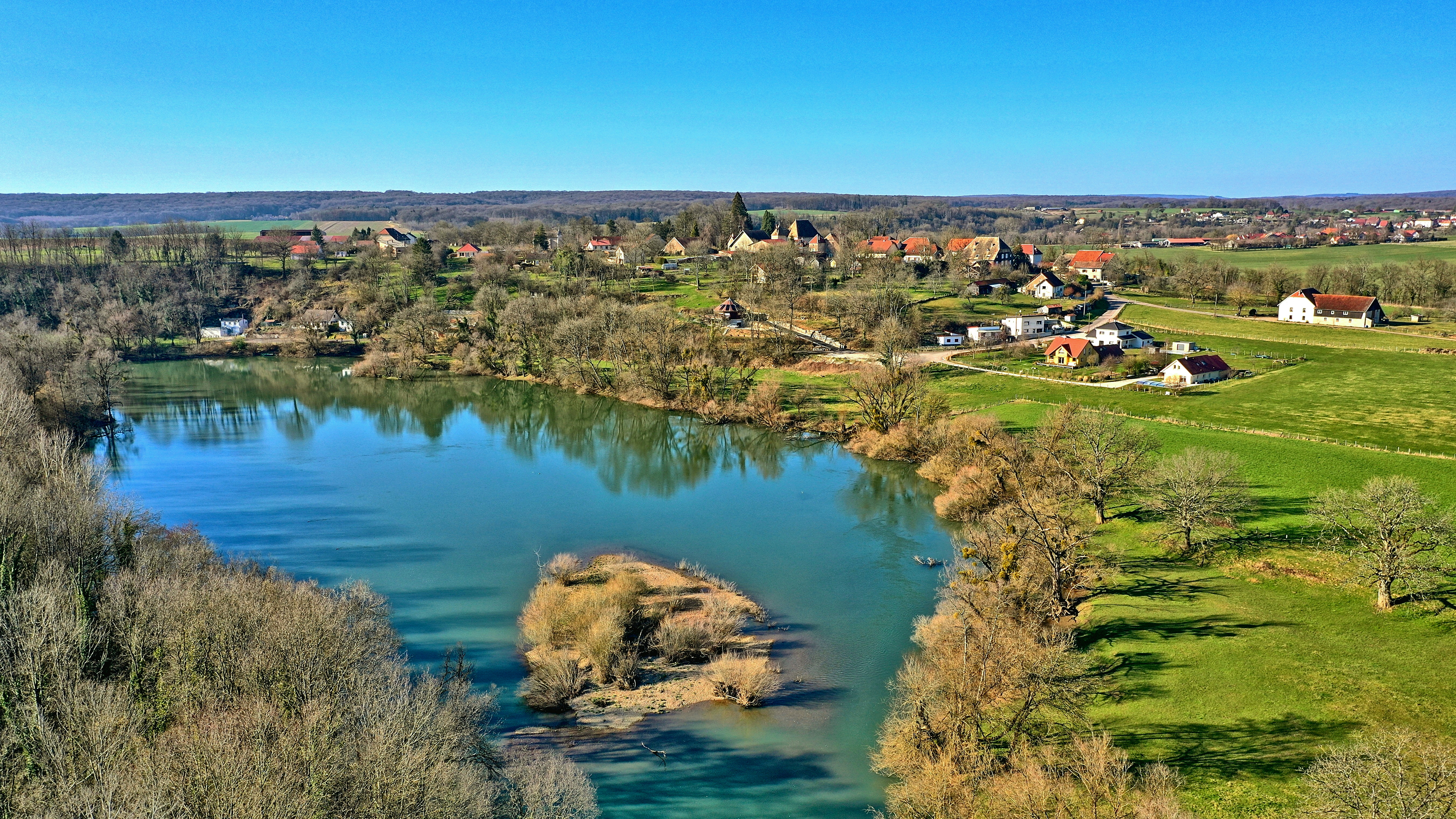
La Barre with the Ognon river

Located in the valley of the Ognon river and neighboring the department of Doubs, La Barre is bordered by the municipalities of Beaumotte-Aubertans, Blarians, Germondans, Rigney and Vandelans. It is 26 kilometres (16 miles) from Besançon and 29 kilometres (18 mi) from Vesoul.

== Demographics ==
Historical population
Year	Pop.	±% p.a.
1968	62	—
1975	49	−3.31%
1982	63	+3.66%
1990	51	−2.61%
1999	61	+2.01%
2007	99	+6.24%
2012	107	+1.57%
2017	101	−1.15%
2023	95	−1.02%
Source: INSEE

== In popular culture ==
The fictional character Jean-Luc Picard of the American science-fiction television series Star Trek: The Next Generation was born and raised in La Barre on his family's vineyard there. Shots of the future La Barre are seen in the 1990 episode "Family". The location of Picard's family village was indicated as being in the Bourgogne-Franche-Comté region of France on wine bottle labels seen in the trailer for Star Trek: Picard, released on May 23, 2019. However, as there are two La Barres in this region of France, it has not been established which one is Picard's home.

== See also ==
- Municipal map of La Barre (png file)
- Communes of Haute-Saône
