= Schricker House =

Schricker House may refer to:

- John Schricker House, listed on the National Register of Historic Places in Davenport, Iowa
- John C. Schricker House, listed on the National Register of Historic Places in Davenport, Iowa
- Selma Schricker House, contributing property in the Riverview Terrace Historic District.
