= Schricker =

Schricker is a surname originally from Germany. Notable people with the surname include:

- (Erich) Erwin Schricker (1878, Straßburg – 1914), German footballer
- Gerhard Schricker (1935, Nuremberg – 2021), a German legal scholar
- Henry (Frederick) Schricker (1883, North Judson – 1966), a governor of Indiana
- Ivo (Wolfgang Eduard) Schricker (1877, Straßburg – 1962), a German footballer
- Karl Schricker (1912, Förstenreuth, Stammbach – 2006), a German painter and graphic artist
- Kenneth M. Schricker (1921, Washburn County – 1978) was a member of the Wisconsin State Assembly

== See also ==
- the John Schricker House
- the John C. Schricker House
- the Selma Schricker House
- the Bust of Henry F. Schricker
- Schrick
