= G. A. Hanssen =

American architect

- Born: November 22, 1869; Davenport, Iowa
- Died: January 4, 1944 (aged 74); San Diego, California
- Education: University of Illinois Urbana-Champaign
- Occupation: Architect
- Spouse: Lillie Stibolt
- Children: 1 son, 1 daughter

Gustav A. Hanssen (November 22, 1869 - January 4, 1944) was an American architect. He designed private residences in Davenport, Iowa and later moved to San Diego, California. Several of his buildings are listed on the National Register of Historic Places (NRHP).

Hanssen graduated from the University of Illinois Urbana-Champaign in 1890, where he played on the Fighting Illini baseball team.

== Works ==
- Sacred Heart Cathedral Rectory, Davenport, Iowa (1895); NRHP-listed
- John C. Schricker House, Davenport, Iowa (1896); NRHP-listed
- Buffalo High School, Buffalo, Iowa (1900); NRHP-listed
- Central Fire Station (Davenport, Iowa), Davenport, Iowa (1901); NRHP-listed
- E.A. Shaw House, Davenport, Iowa (1901); NRHP-listed
- Walsh Flats/Langwith Building, Davenport, Iowa (1910); NRHP-listed
- One or more buildings in the Oak Lane Historic District, Davenport, Iowa; NRHP-listed
- One or more buildings in the Riverview Terrace Historic District, Davenport, Iowa; NRHP-listed
- One or more buildings in the Vander Veer Park Historic District, Davenport, Iowa; NRHP-listed
- Yuma County Courthouse, Yuma, Arizona (1928; with Ralph Swearingen); NRHP-listed
