= Oscar C. Woods House =

Historic house in Iowa, United States

- U.S. National Register of Historic Places
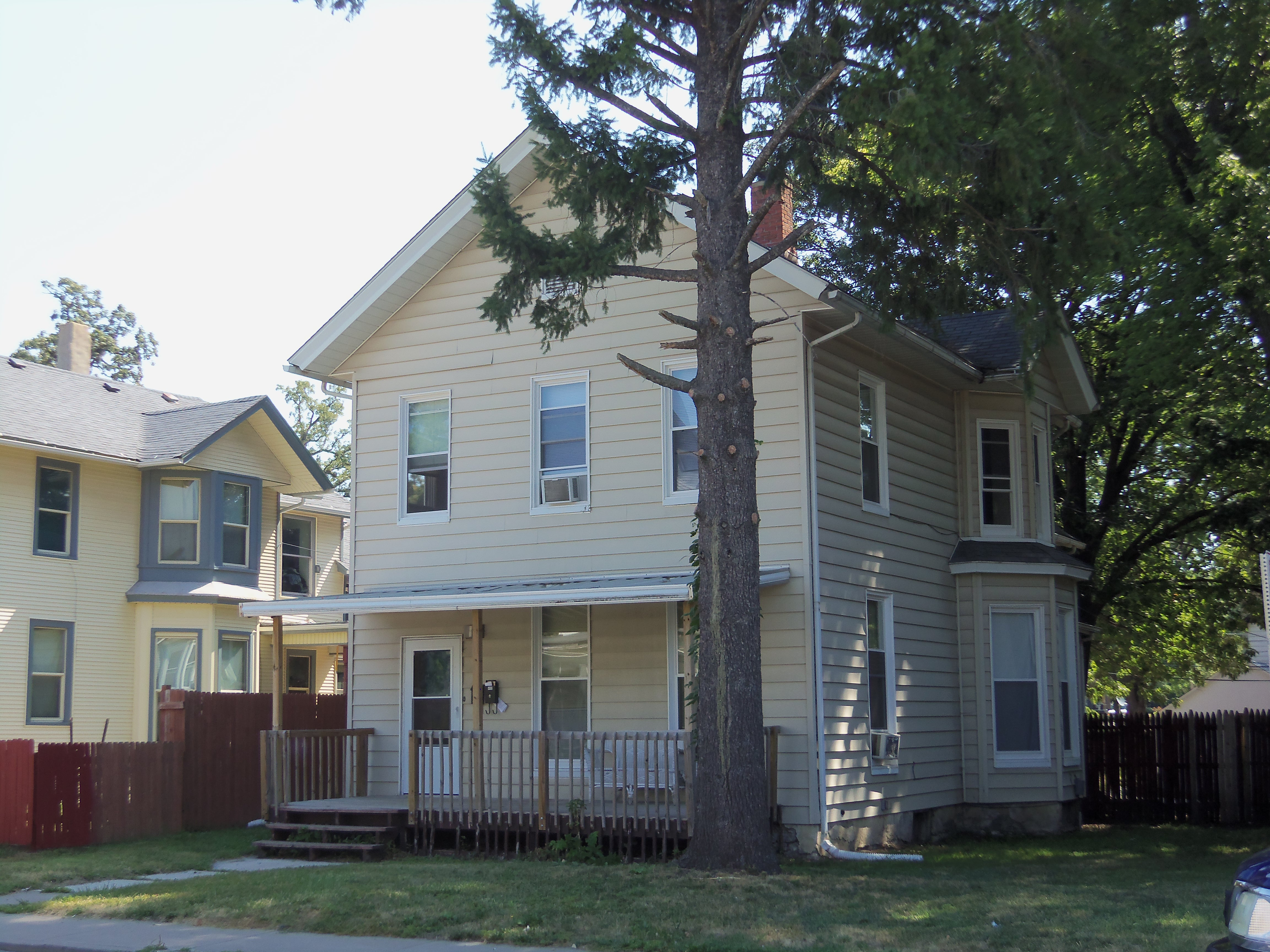

- Location within Iowa Location within the United States
- Location: 1825 Grand Ave. Davenport, Iowa
- Coordinates: 41°32′16.71″N 90°33′52.93″W
- Area: less than one acre
- Built: 1880
- Architectural style: Vernacular (McClelland)
- MPS: Davenport MRA
- NRHP reference No.: 84000342
- Added to NRHP: November 1, 1984

The Oscar C. Woods House is a historic building located on the east side of Davenport, Iowa, United States. It has been listed on the National Register of Historic Places since 1984.

== Oscar C. Woods ==
Oscar Woods was born in Passumpsic, Vermont in 1835, the son of Riley and Lydia (White) Woods. He was educated in the local public schools and attended St. Johnsbury Academy. He first moved to Chicago and then to La Moille, Illinois where he married Qeora Holbrooke in 1864. They had one child who died young and adopted a daughter. Woods was involved in the dry-goods business with his brother while he was in Illinois and then raised livestock. After he settled in Davenport in 1883 he purchased, with others, a wholesale fruit business, which he organized as The Martin Woods Company. Woods would build a larger house on East Locust Street in 1900. It is a contributing property in the Oak Lane Historic District.

== Architecture ==
The two-story, frame house built on a stone foundation is an example of a popular 19th-century Vernacular house style in Davenport known as the McClelland. It features a front gable, a three-bay facade with an entrance to one side, and a projecting polygonal window bay on the south side. Some of the embellishments that gave this house interest have either been covered with vinyl siding or have been removed entirely. One of the removed elements was an Adamesque-style porch from around the turn of the 20th century. It was decorated with swags and ribbon motif in the pediment, and columns in the Tuscan order. It also featured ornamental shingling of the gable ends on the front and on the south side window bay. At one time the window surrounds had small bracketed cornices and heads with incised decorations.
