= Buffalo High School =

Buffalo High School may refer to:

- Buffalo High School (Buffalo, Iowa)
- Buffalo High School (Buffalo, Minnesota)
- Buffalo High School (Buffalo, Missouri)
- Buffalo High School (West Virginia)
- Buffalo High School (Buffalo, Wyoming)
