= Buffalo Township, Scott County, Iowa =

Buffalo Township
- Township
- Location in Scott County
- Coordinates: 41°28′53″N 090°43′48″W
- Country: United States
- State: Iowa
- County: Scott

Area
  - Total: 23.17 sq mi (60.02 km^{2})
  - Land: 22.12 sq mi (57.29 km^{2})
  - Water: 1.05 sq mi (2.73 km^{2}) 4.55%
- Elevation: 692 ft (211 m)

Population (2000)
  - Total: 4,688
  - Density: 212/sq mi (81.8/km^{2})
- GNIS feature ID: 0467504

Buffalo Township is a township in Scott County, Iowa, United States. As of the 2000 census, its population was 4,688.

== Geography ==
Buffalo Township covers an area of 23.17 square miles (60.0 km^{2}) and contains one incorporated settlement, Buffalo. According to the USGS, it contains four cemeteries: Asbury, Blue Grass, Rose Hill and Saint Peter's.

The streams of Dodges Creek, Donaldson Creek and Moore Creek run through this township.

== Transportation ==
Buffalo Township contains one airport or landing strip, Village Oaks Landing Strip.
