= Clifton (Davenport, Iowa) =

Historic house in Iowa, United States

- U.S. National Register of Historic Places
- U.S. Historic district – Contributing property
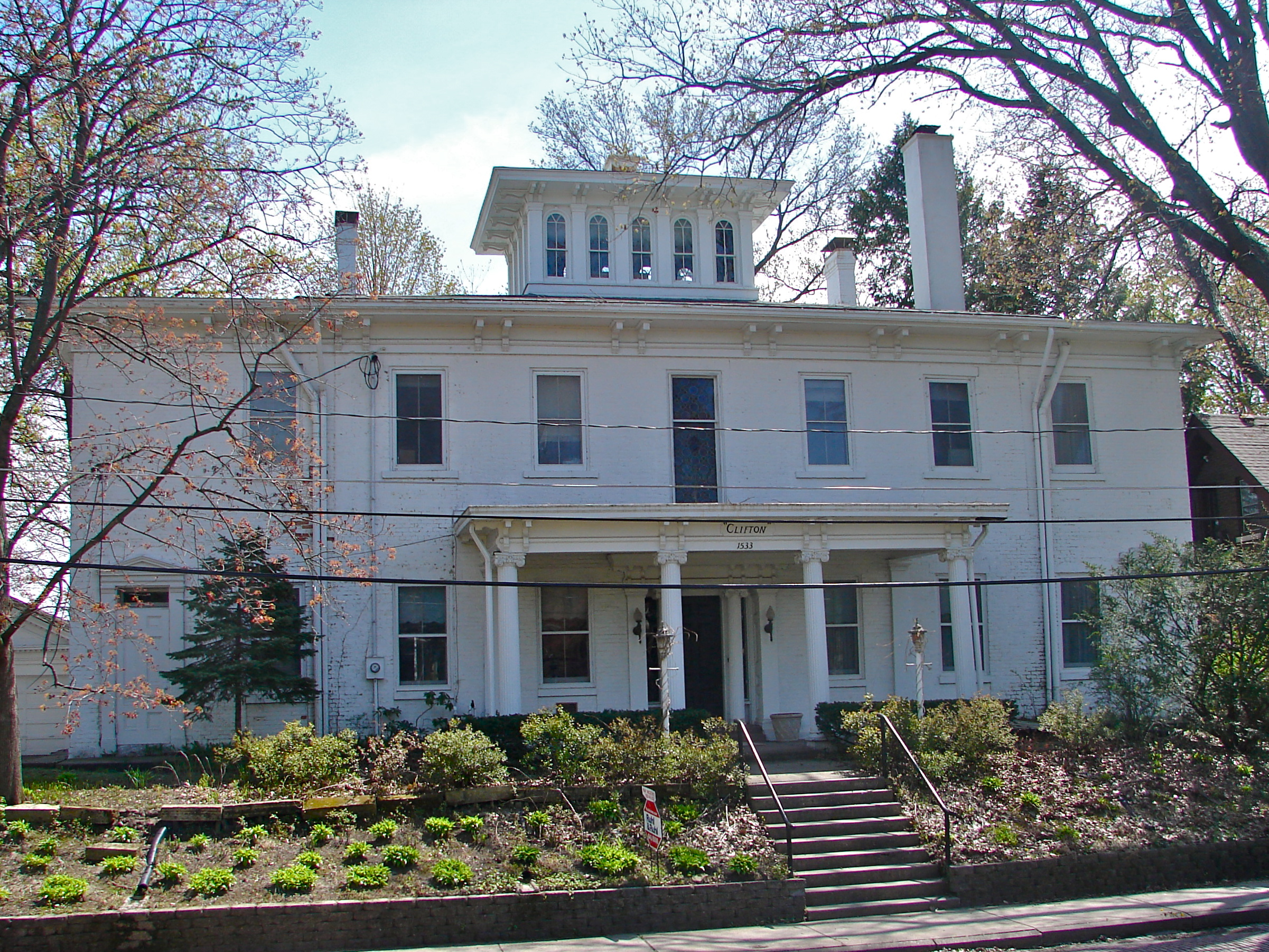

- Location within Iowa Location within the United States
- Location: 1533 Clay St. Davenport, Iowa
- Coordinates: 41°31′49.6″N 90°35′50.8″W
- Built: 1853
- Architectural style: Italianate; Greek Revival
- Part of: Riverview Terrace Historic District (ID84000339)
- NRHP reference No.: 79000940
- Added to NRHP: February 21, 1979

Clifton is a historic building located in the West End of Davenport, Iowa, United States. The residence was individually listed on the National Register of Historic Places in 1979. It was included as a contributing property in the Riverview Terrace Historic District in 1983.

== History ==
The house was constructed for J.M.D. Burrows. He was an early settler to Davenport having arrived in the town c. 1838. In 1844 he established a wholesale company, Burrows and Prettyman. They did business along the Upper Mississippi River and west to the Missouri River in Iowa and Nebraska. They also made significant profits from their contracts with the U.S. Government supplying Fort Snelling and Fort Crawford along the Mississippi. He lost his firm in the Financial Panic of 1857. Burrows mortgaged the house to Antoine LeClaire to pay off his debts. He was never able to regain the title to the house and it eventually went to the descendants of George Davenport. Both Davenport and LeClaire founded the city of Davenport and developed it in its earliest decades. In 1905 the house was sold to John Winters, who converted it into apartments.

== Architecture ==
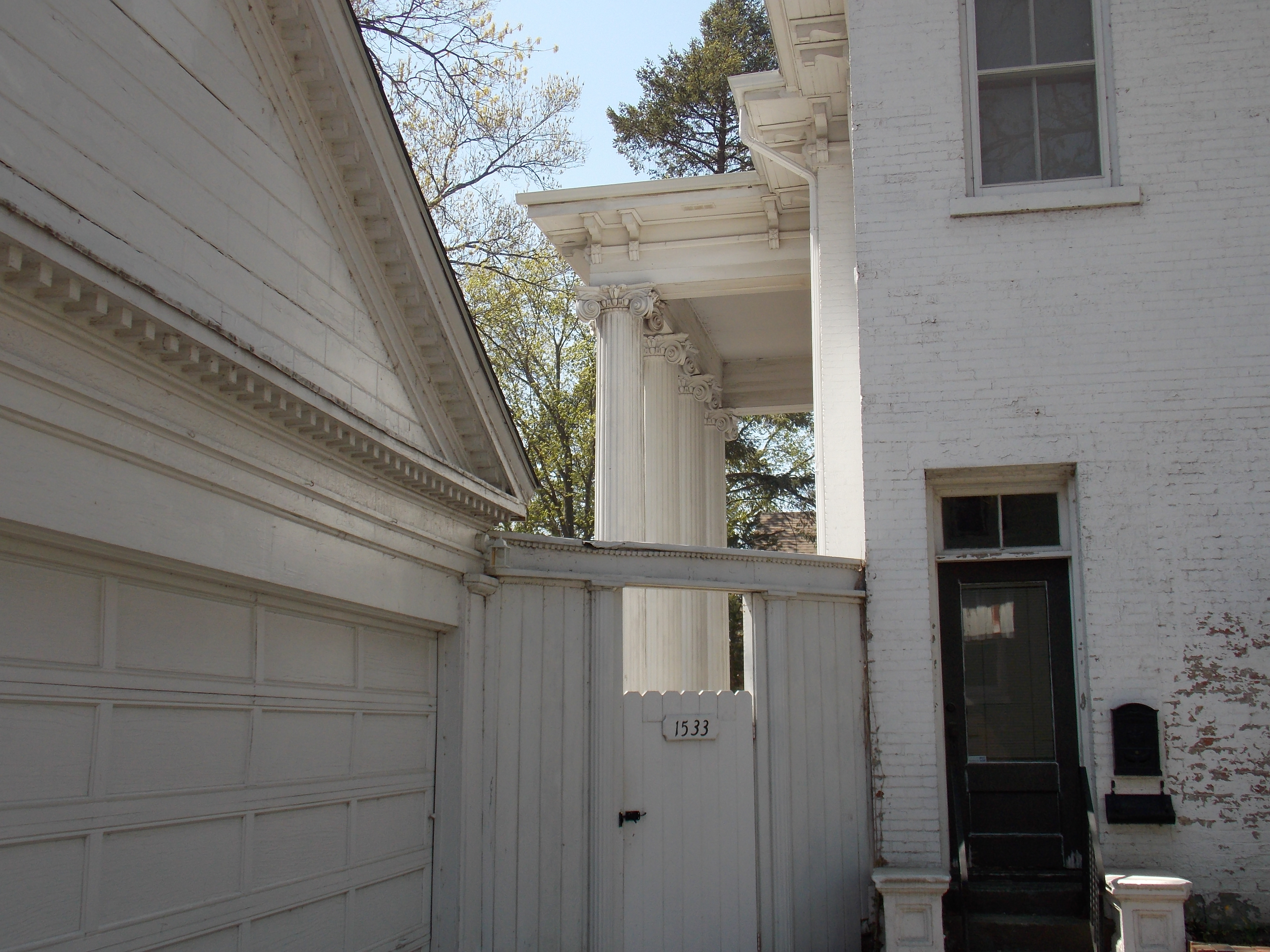
The portico on the south side of the house.

The house is typical of the Italianate style in Davenport in that it also included elements of the Greek Revival style found especially at the main entrance. It is a two-story, nearly square Italianate palazzo. It features a large square cupola on the center of the hipped roof. The cupola has five narrow, round-arch windows on each side.

The two show fronts are five bays wide. The garden front on the south has a pedimented tetrastyle portico. The wall brackets on the cornice continue onto the portico. The columns that hold up the portico follow the Renaissance Ionic order after Vincenzo Scamozzi. The columns rest on paneled pedestals. Between them is a cast concrete balustrade that was extended in the early 20th-century in a semi-circular fashion beyond the portico. The north front of the house has a one-story porch that covers the middle three bays. At one time it stretched the entire length of the house.

When the house was built there were single-story, two-bay wings on the east and west sides. They stopped short of the main wall on the south front and ended in short recessed porches. Sometime after 1905, the porches were eliminated and a second floor was added to both wings when the house was converted into apartments.
