= E.A. Shaw House =

Historic house in Iowa, United States

- U.S. National Register of Historic Places
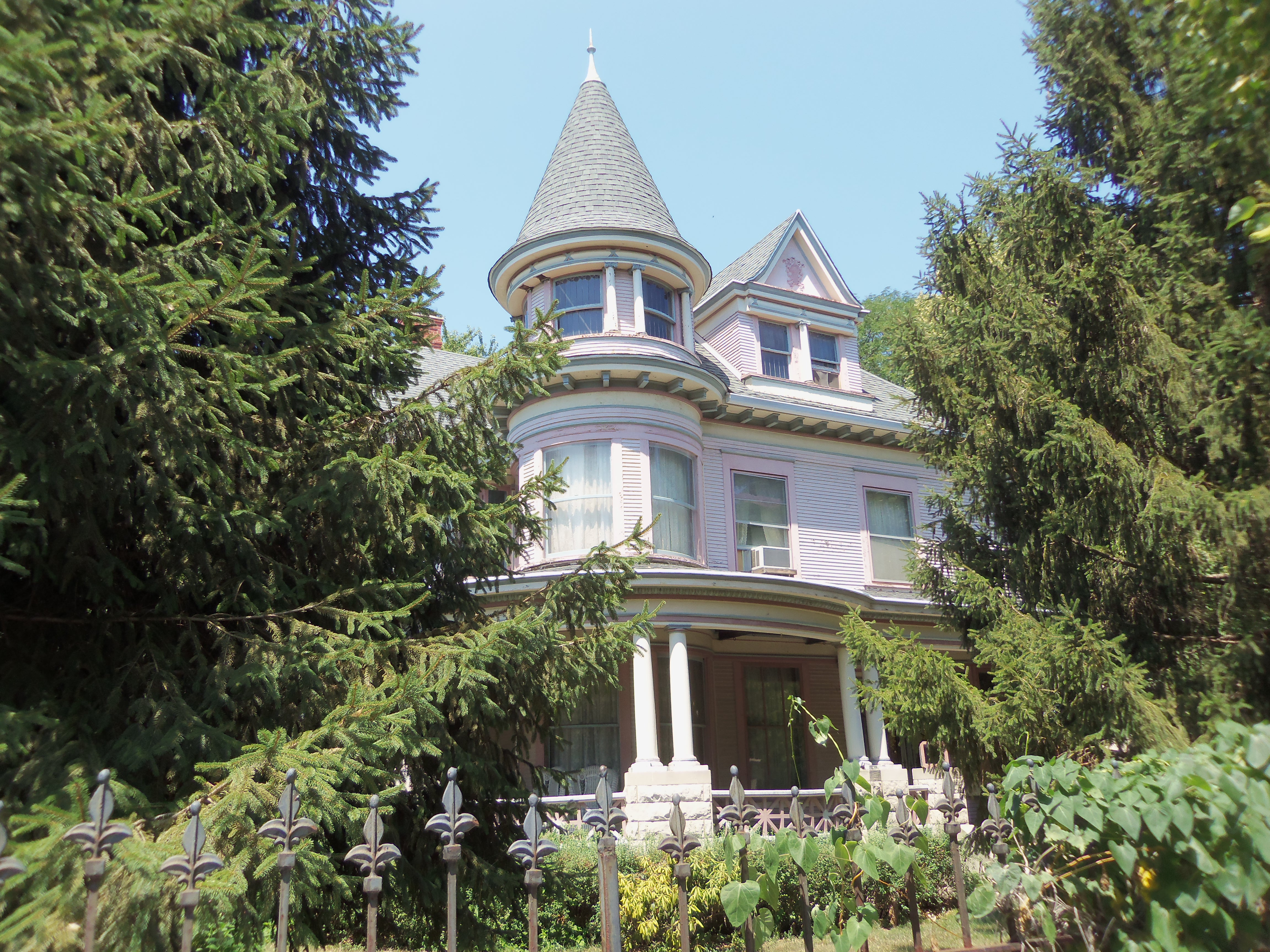

- Location within Iowa Location within the United States
- Location: 1102 College Ave. Davenport, Iowa
- Coordinates: 41°31′53″N 90°33′24″W
- Area: less than one acre
- Built: 1901
- Architect: Gustav A. Hanssen
- Architectural style: Queen Anne
- MPS: Davenport MRA
- NRHP reference No.: 84001561
- Added to NRHP: July 27, 1984

The E.A. Shaw House is a historic building located on the east side of Davenport, Iowa, United States. It has been listed on the National Register of Historic Places since 1984.

== E.A. Shaw ==
E.A. Shaw was associated with the local lumber firm of Renwick, Shaw & Crossett. He also had extensive timberland holdings in Minnesota and other areas of the country. Shaw had this house built as a family residence around 1901.

== Architecture ==
Davenport architect Gustav Hanssen designed this house in the Queen Anne style. It is a fine local example of the late period of the style's development. The house features the asymmetry and irregularity found in Victorian architecture and combines it with neoclassical details. Its location on a corner lot at the crest of a long hill leading down to the Mississippi River and its corner tower lend additional prominence to the house. This frame structure is built on a masonry foundation. The exterior is covered with extremely narrow clapboarding. The wrap-around porch features paired columns in the Doric order that rest on stone pedestals. Engaged columns in the Ionic order are found on the third stage of the semicircular corner tower. Egg-and-dart molding is located below the cornice, and a Palladian window is located in the south gable. A porte-cochere is located on the southwest corner of the house.
