= Riverview Terrace Historic District =

Historic district in Iowa, United States

- U.S. National Register of Historic Places
- U.S. Historic district
- Davenport Register of Historic Properties
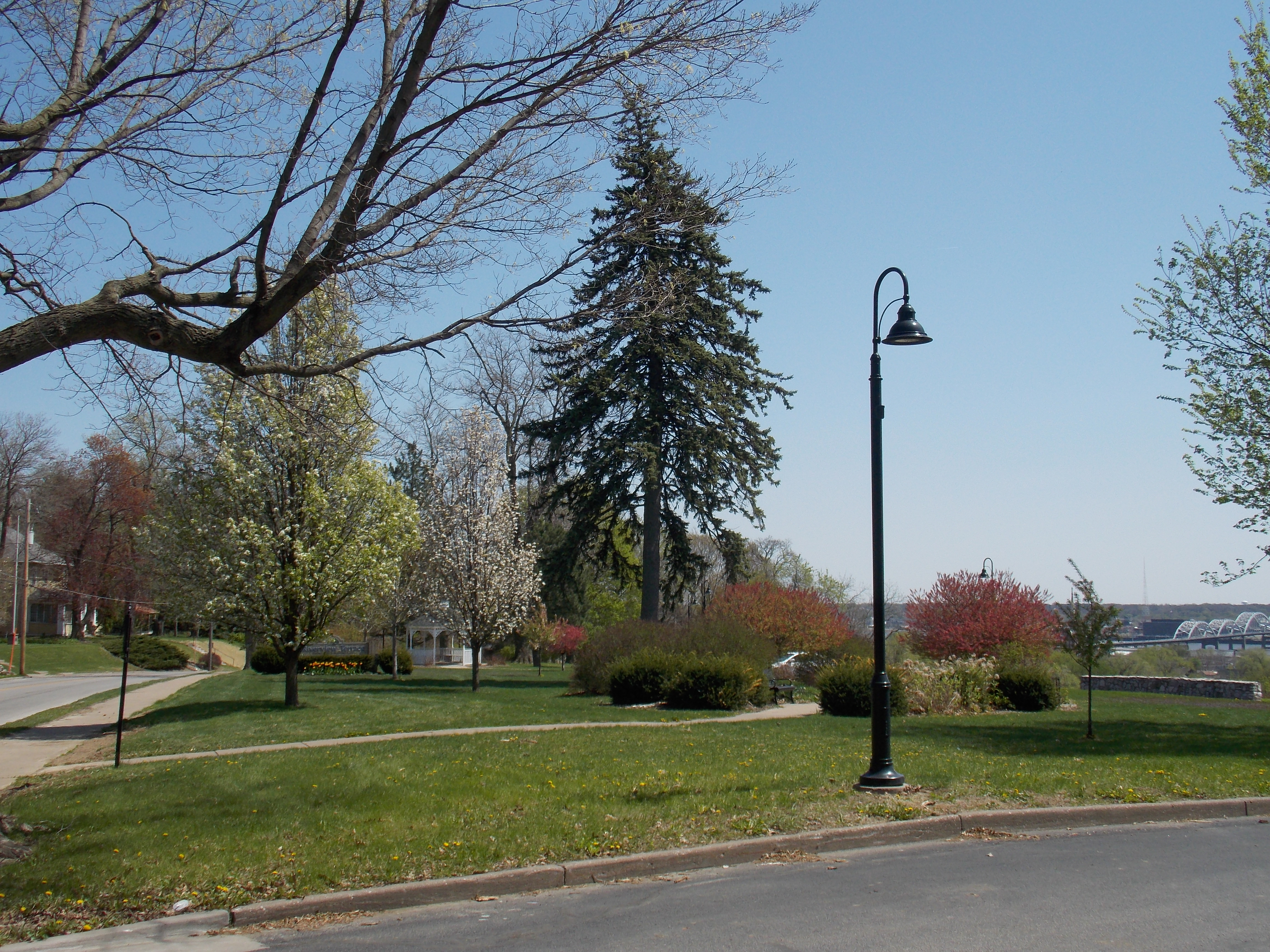
- Riverview Terrace Park

- Location within Iowa Location within the United States
- Location: Roughly Riverview Terr., Clay and Washington Sts., Davenport, Iowa
- Coordinates: 41°31′49″N 90°35′43″W
- Area: 15.2 acres (6.2 ha)
- Architect: Clausen & Clausen; Gustav Hanssen
- Architectural style: Bungalow/Craftsman; Georgian Revival; Late Victorian; Italian Villa
- MPS: Davenport MRA
- NRHP reference No.: 84000339
- DRHP No.: 16

Significant dates
- Added to NRHP: November 1, 1984
- Designated DRHP: August 4, 1993

The Riverview Terrace Historic District is a 15.2-acre (6.2 ha) historic district in Davenport, Iowa, United States, that was listed on the National Register of Historic Places in 1984. It was listed on the Davenport Register of Historic Properties in 1993. The neighborhood was originally named Burrow's Bluff and Lookout Park and contains a three-acre park on a large hill.

== Description ==
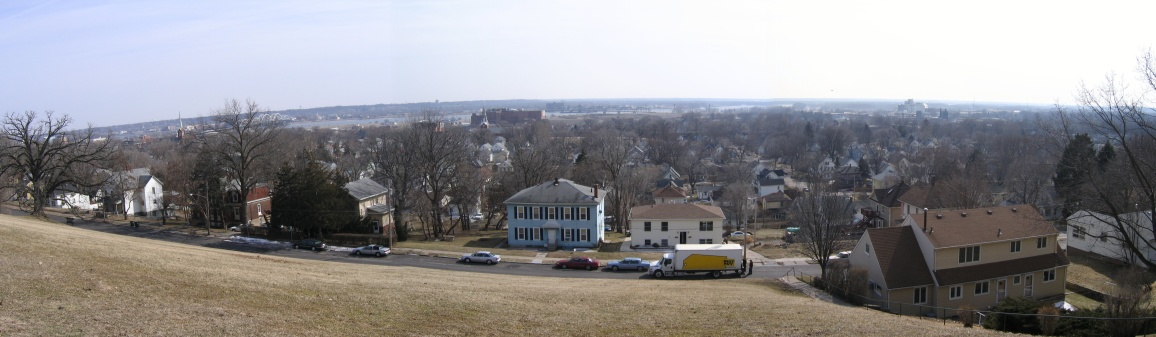
The view from Riverview Terrace Park

In 1984, the district included 21 buildings deemed to contribute to the historic character of the area, and one other contributing site. The district is significant for its architectural styles, which are representative of late-19th century and early-20th century styles that were popular during that period in Davenport. The neighborhood has local significance as being one of the few developed at the turn of the twentieth century with a park as the focal point.

Riverview Terrace runs along Clay Street from Fillmore Street northwest a few blocks to the edge of the former Marycrest College campus. On the south side of the neighborhood is Riverview Terrace Park. The park is a large steep hill, and offers a view of the river and Rock Island, Illinois. The area around the park contains large Italianate, Georgian, and Federal style houses. Beyond the park are smaller houses in the Bungalow and American Craftsman styles along with brick streets.

== History ==
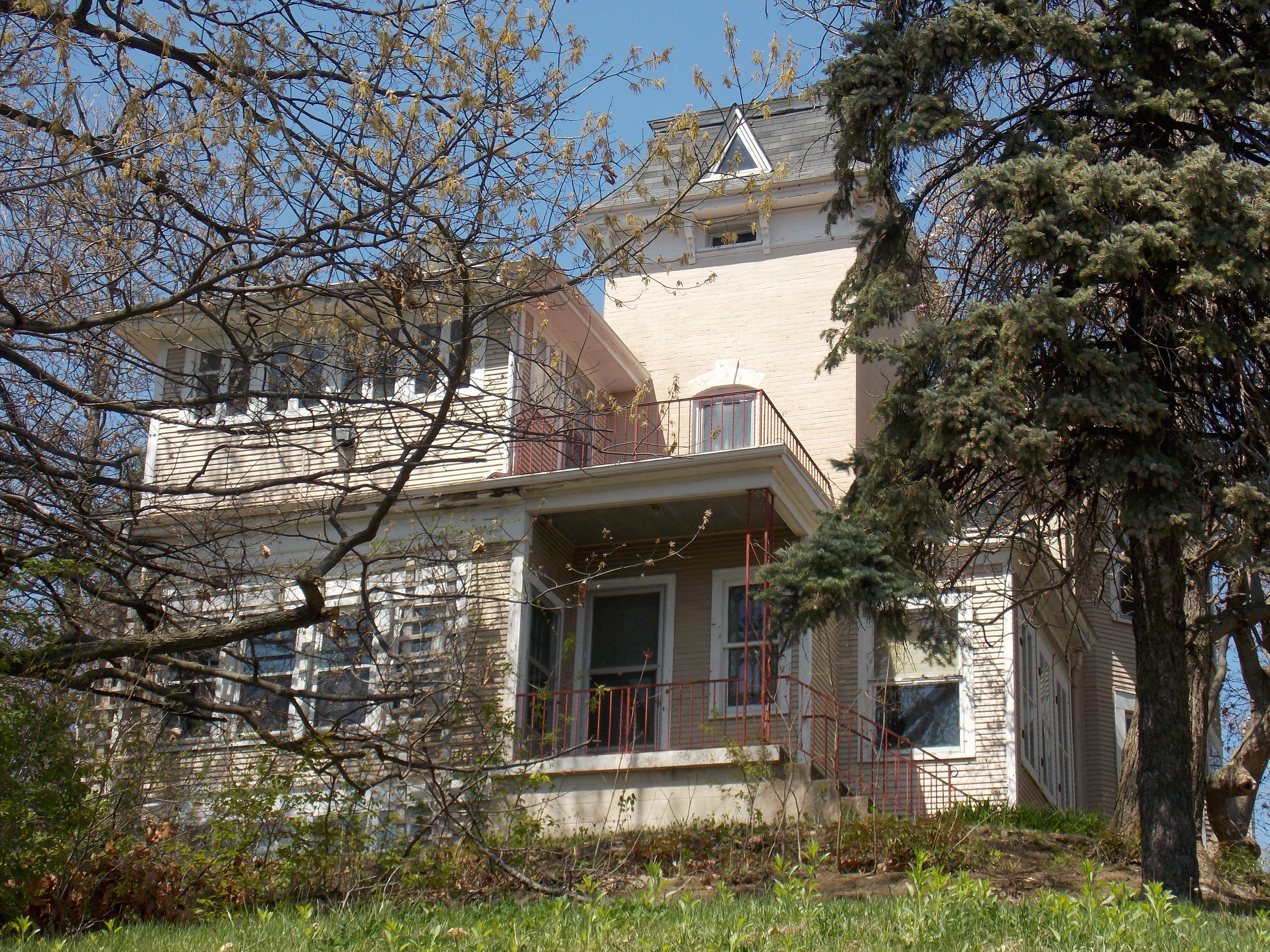
Samuel Hoffman House

The first house built in the district was J.M.D. Burrows' house. Named Clifton, it is an Italianate house that was built in 1853. It remained the only house in the area until the 1880s. At that time it was joined by two Italian Villa-style homes, the Samuel Hoffman House (1401 Clay St.) and the Henry Petersen House (1012 Marquette). They were joined by houses for prominent German-American families that were significant in Davenport's 19th century commercial and industrial development such as the Schrickers (pearl button manufacturing), Muellers (lumber milling), Strucks (banking), and the Petersens (retail merchandising). Many of these families had previously settled in the Hamburg neighborhood. The Schrickers' built two of the city's finest examples of the Georgian Revival style, the John C. Schricker House (1896) and the Selma Schricker House (1902).

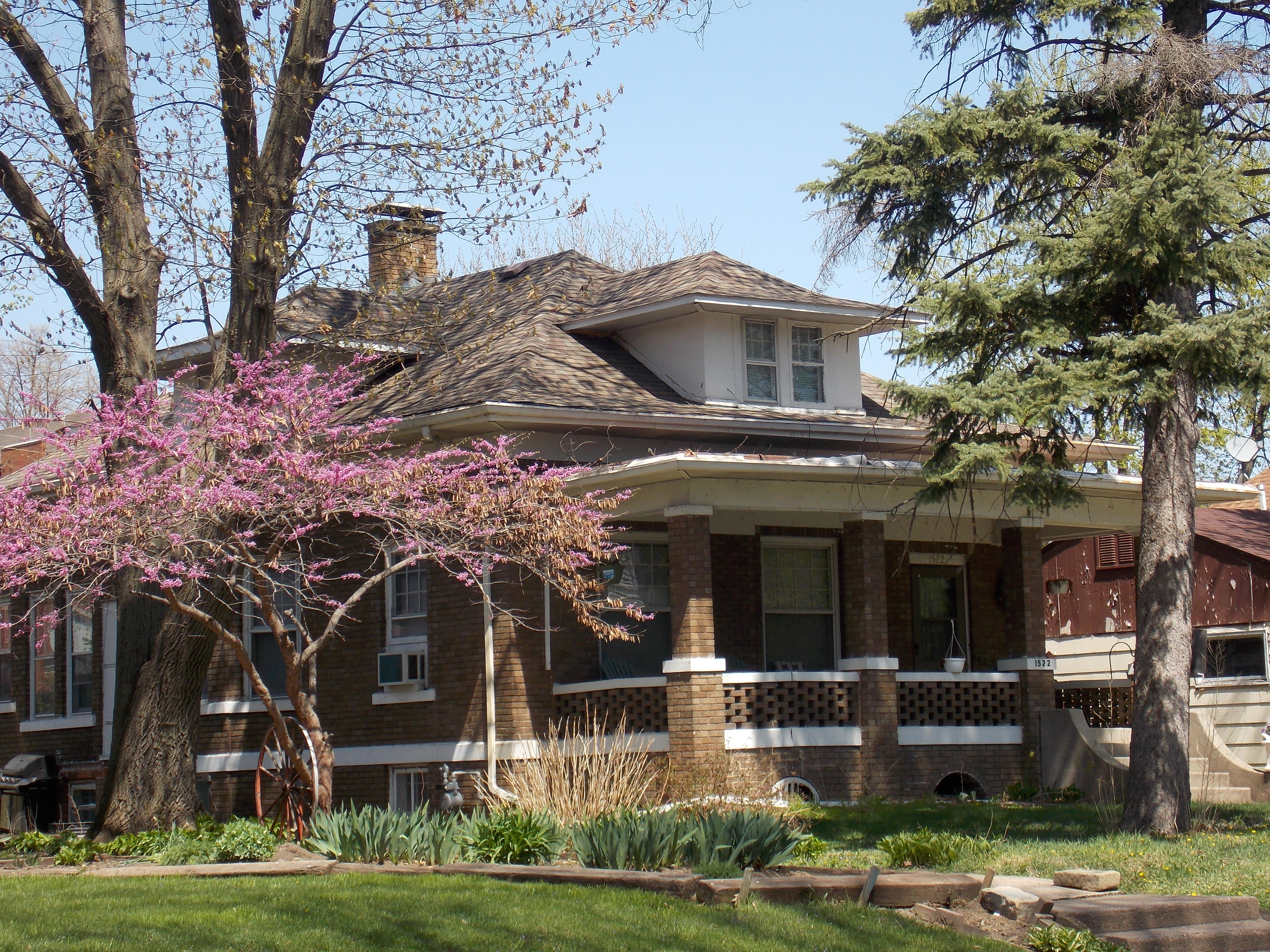
American Craftsman house on Clay St.

The land that the park sits on was acquired by the Davenport Board of Parks Commissioners in 1894. At that time it was called Lookout Park and was renamed Riverview Terrace shortly after 1900. It, along with Prospect Park, was part of a city program to develop public parks throughout Davenport. Unlike the Prospect Park neighborhood, which developed mostly large and fashionable residences, Riverview Terrace included construction of more modest-sized homes in the Foursquare and Craftsman styles that dominate the western portion of Clay Street. The Max Petersen and Kuno Struck houses were disconnected from the Riverview Terrace neighborhood when Marycrest College was established on their properties by the Catholic Diocese of Davenport in the 1930s.
