= Buffalo High School (Buffalo, Iowa) =

- U.S. National Register of Historic Places
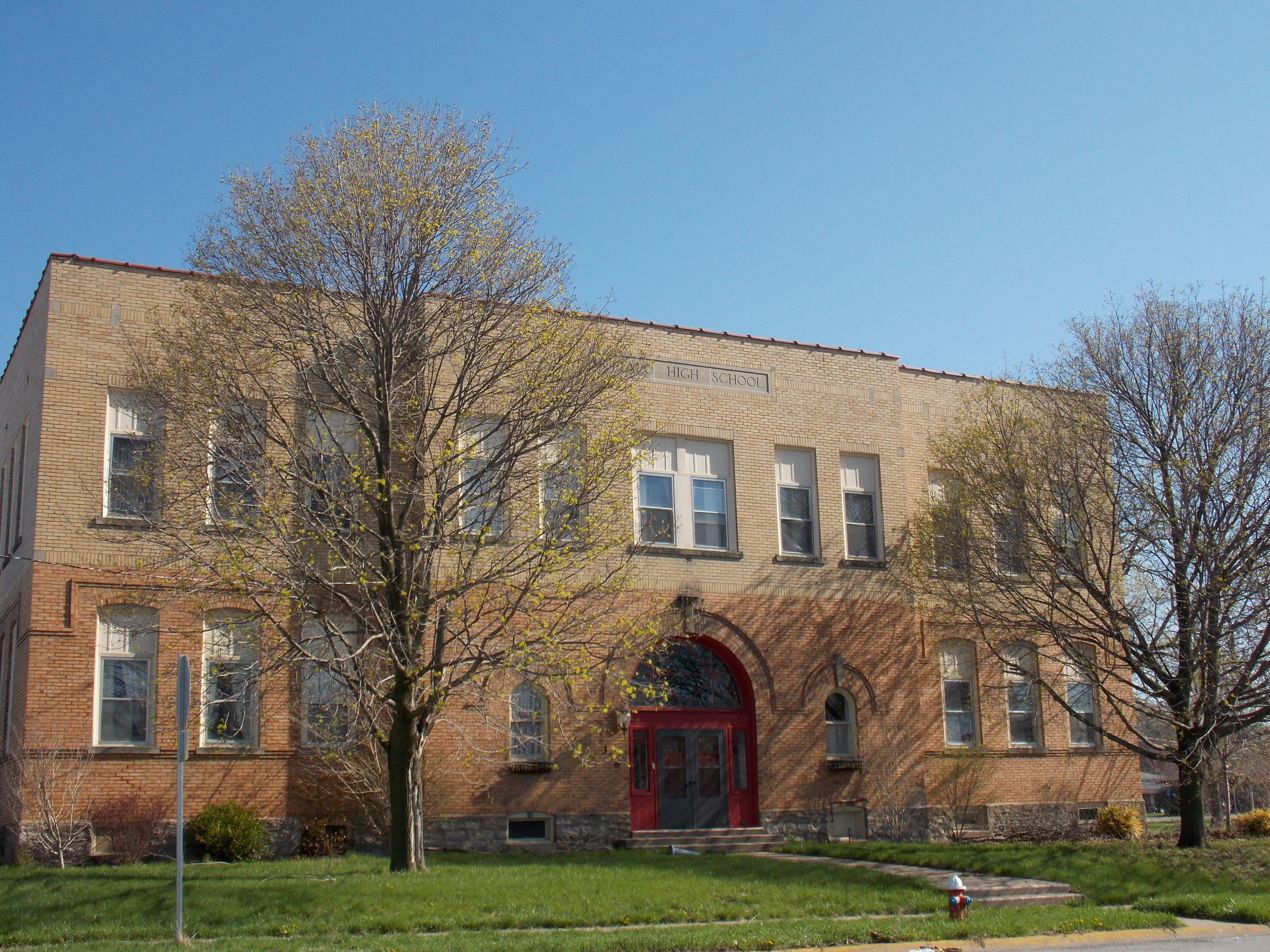

- Location within Iowa Location within the United States
- Location: 326 E. 4th St. Buffalo, Iowa
- Coordinates: 41°27′31″N 90°43′16″W
- Area: less than one acre
- Built: 1900/1928
- Architect: Gustav Hanssen (1900); Arthur Ebeling (1928)
- Architectural style: Late 19th and Early 20th Century Revivals
- NRHP reference No.: 05000901
- Added to NRHP: August 22, 2005

Buffalo High School, also known as Independent School District #1 and Buffalo Elementary School, is an historic building located in Buffalo, Iowa, United States. It was listed on the National Register of Historic Places in 2005.

== History ==
Buffalo was the first settlement in Scott County to incorporate in 1836. The first school building in the town was constructed three years later. The first school located at Fourth and Washington Streets was built in 1850. Ten years later Buffalo voted to become an independent school district. Buffalo Township was divided into seven independent school districts. The district that served the town of Buffalo was Independent School District #1. In 1865 they built a two-story frame school building on Fourth Street. By 1894 the town had grown to 500 people and the school building had become overcrowded.

The school district hired Davenport architect Gustav Hanssen to design a new building. Plumbeck and Frandzen received the brick contract and likely used brick from the Davenport Paving Brick and Tile Company in Buffalo. Frank and Wrage did the carpentry work. The Knights of Pythias bought the old building and moved it to Third and Jefferson Streets. It remained standing into the 21st century. Opened in 1900 the new school building was a single-story, three-section, structure. It was capped with a hipped roof and had dormers for ventilation. The T-shaped building had a prominent gable-front entry vestibule and a belfry at the center. The building featured three classrooms, which was an increase from two in the previous building, and housed grades 1-8. Restrooms flanked the main entrance and a small office for the superintendent was located where the staircase is now situated. The school building was built for $5,000.

The school educated students in eight grades until 1927 when the ninth grade was added in preparation for the addition of high school classes. That same year Davenport architect Arthur Ebeling presented plans for the addition of a second story to the school building. A bond issue of $20,000 was passed in January of the following year, and J.H. Hunzinger was hired as the general contractor. The rooms on the new second floor aligned with those on the first floor. An office was located over the main entrance. The lower grades were housed on the first floor. Grades 1 and 2 were located in the west classroom, grades 3 and 4 in the north classroom, and grades 5 and 6 in the east classroom. The second floor housed the upper grades. Grades 7 and 8 were located in the west classroom and grades 9 to 12 were all taught in the east classroom. A science lab and other specialized classes were housed in the north classroom. The basement was also used for classroom space. Home economics was taught in the east room, and mechanical training in the west room. The boiler room was under the north classrooms as it was previously.

The first class to graduate from Buffalo High School was in 1931 with 12 students. The smallest graduating classes were in 1932 and 1935 with five students and the largest class was 15 in 1943. There was no graduating class in 1948 as the three students attended Davenport High School. The school colors were red and white until 1942 when they were changed to blue and gold.

By 1952 overcrowding was an issue again and a new school building was built on Dodge Street. It was dedicated on February 15, 1953, and the upper grades were moved into the new building. A law was passed in Iowa in 1958 that required minimum high school standards. Buffalo decided to discontinue their high school program. Because the Davenport Community School District refused to take the Buffalo students, they were bused to Bettendorf High School. Another state law was passed in 1966 requiring contingent districts to accept students, so Buffalo became part of the Davenport school district and their students attended Central High School. The 1953 Buffalo school was used as an elementary and intermediate school. Some classes were still held in the old Buffalo High School building through the mid-1970s.

In 1976 the city of Buffalo bought the old high school building from the Davenport school district. They used it as a community center to house various offices and organizations, including the town's library. Davenport schools built a new school on the north edge of town in 2002. Many of the community offices moved from the old high school building to the 1953 building, which left the old building vacant. In 2004 it was sold to Thomas and Maria Caudle for $49,500. They converted it into a home. Developers Jesse Hammes and Tom Swanwick bought the building in 2010 with plans to convert the structure into a four condo complex. Eventually, Winsor Consulting of Davenport acquired the building and extensively renovated it for their offices.
