= Oak Lane Historic District =

Historic district in Iowa, United States

- U.S. National Register of Historic Places
- U.S. Historic district
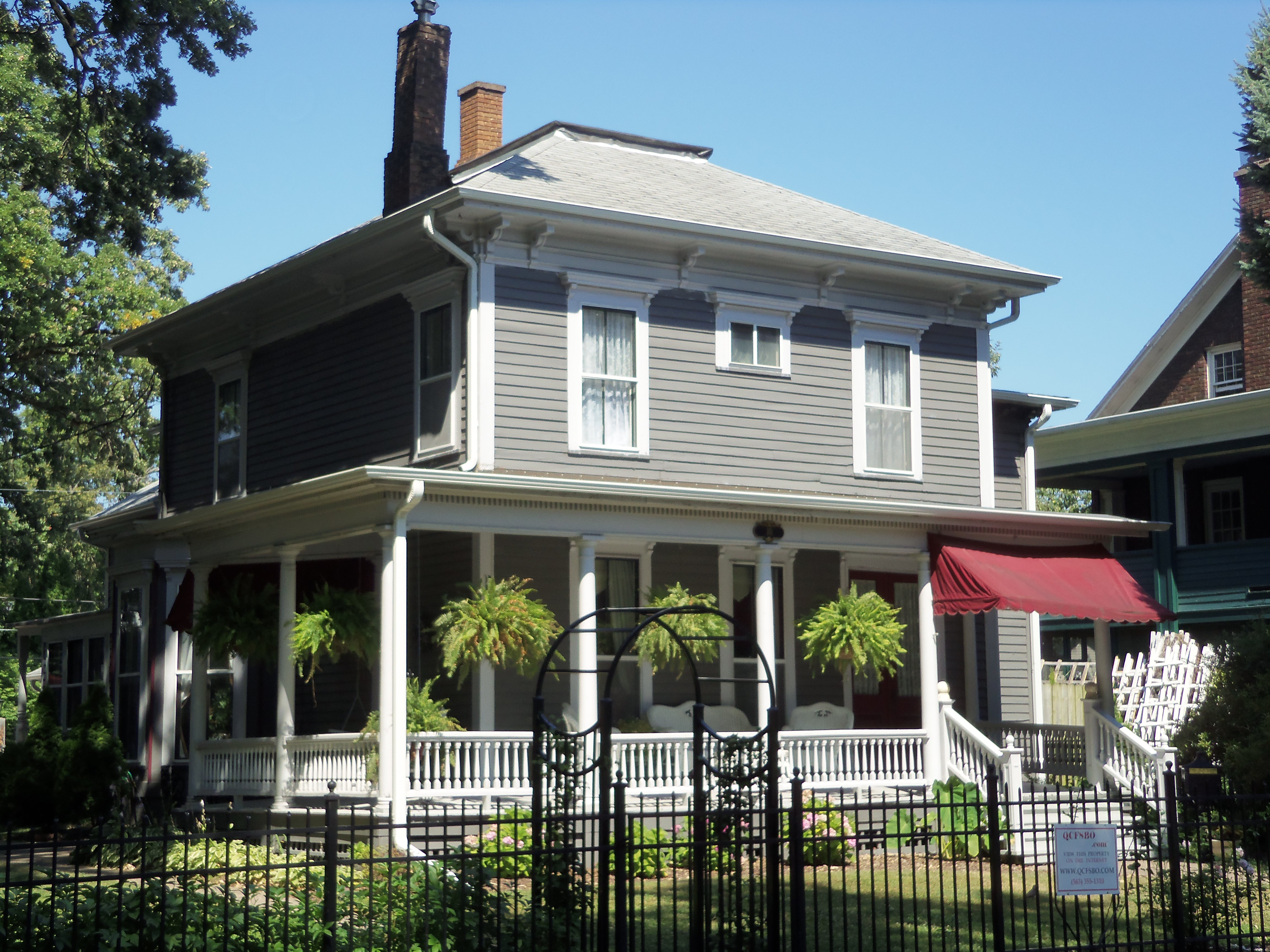
- Amos Cutter House

- Location within Iowa Location within the United States
- Location: Oak Lane between High and Locust Streets; Davenport, Iowa
- Coordinates: 41°32′22″N 90°33′47″W
- Area: 7.86 acres (3.18 ha)
- Built: 1875-1906
- Architect: Gustav Hanssen; William A. Otis
- Architectural style: Colonial Revival
- MPS: Davenport MRA
- NRHP reference No.: 84000331
- Added to NRHP: November 1, 1984

The Oak Lane Historic District is located on the east side of Davenport, Iowa, United States. It has been listed on the National Register of Historic Places since 1984. The historic district is a residential area that stretches along Oak Lane between High Street on the north and East Locust Street on the south. There are 27 houses that make up the district. Twenty-three houses are located on Oak Lane and four are on Locust Street; the three immediately to the west of Oak Lane and one immediately to the east.

== History ==
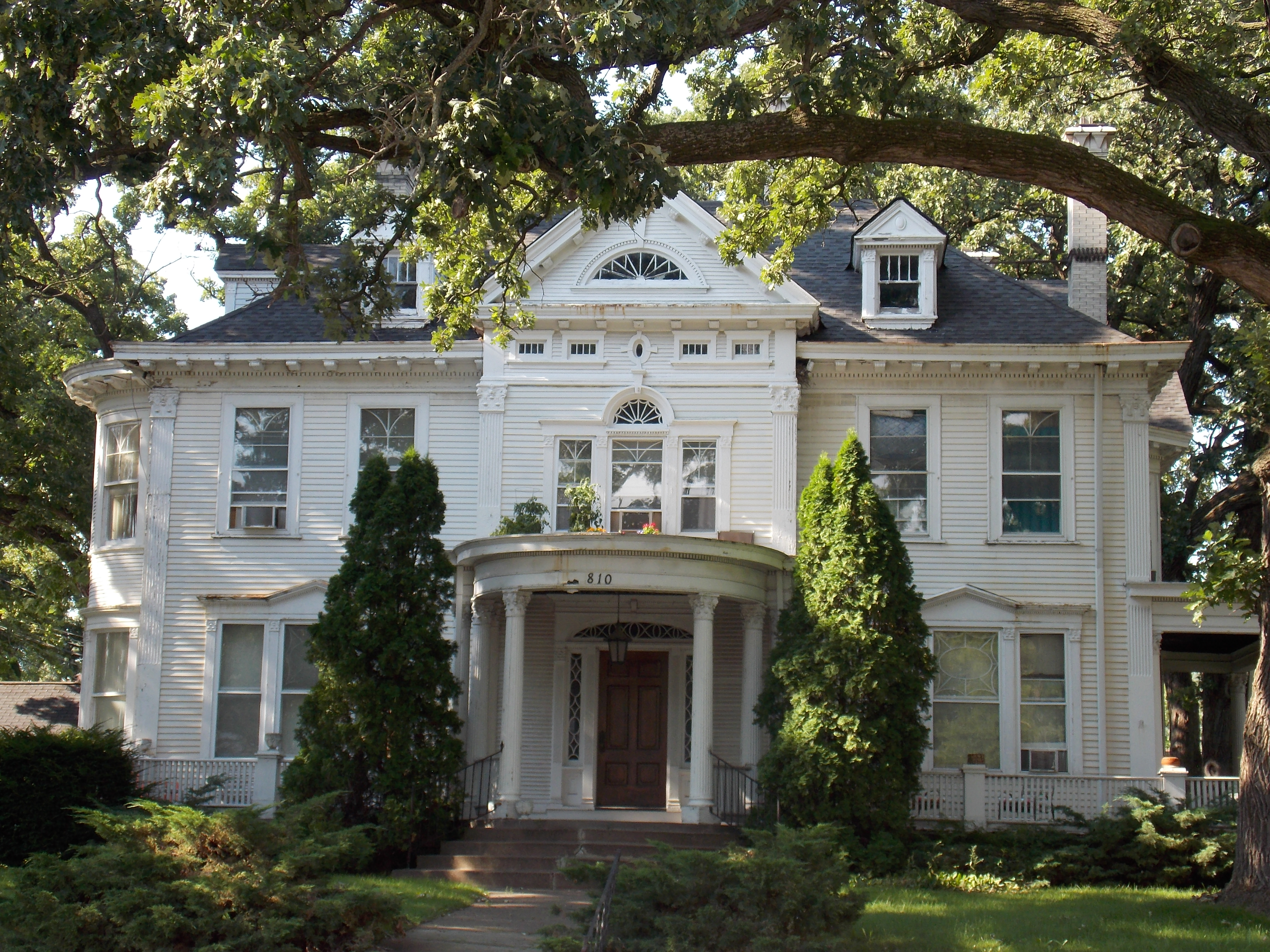
George S. Johnson House

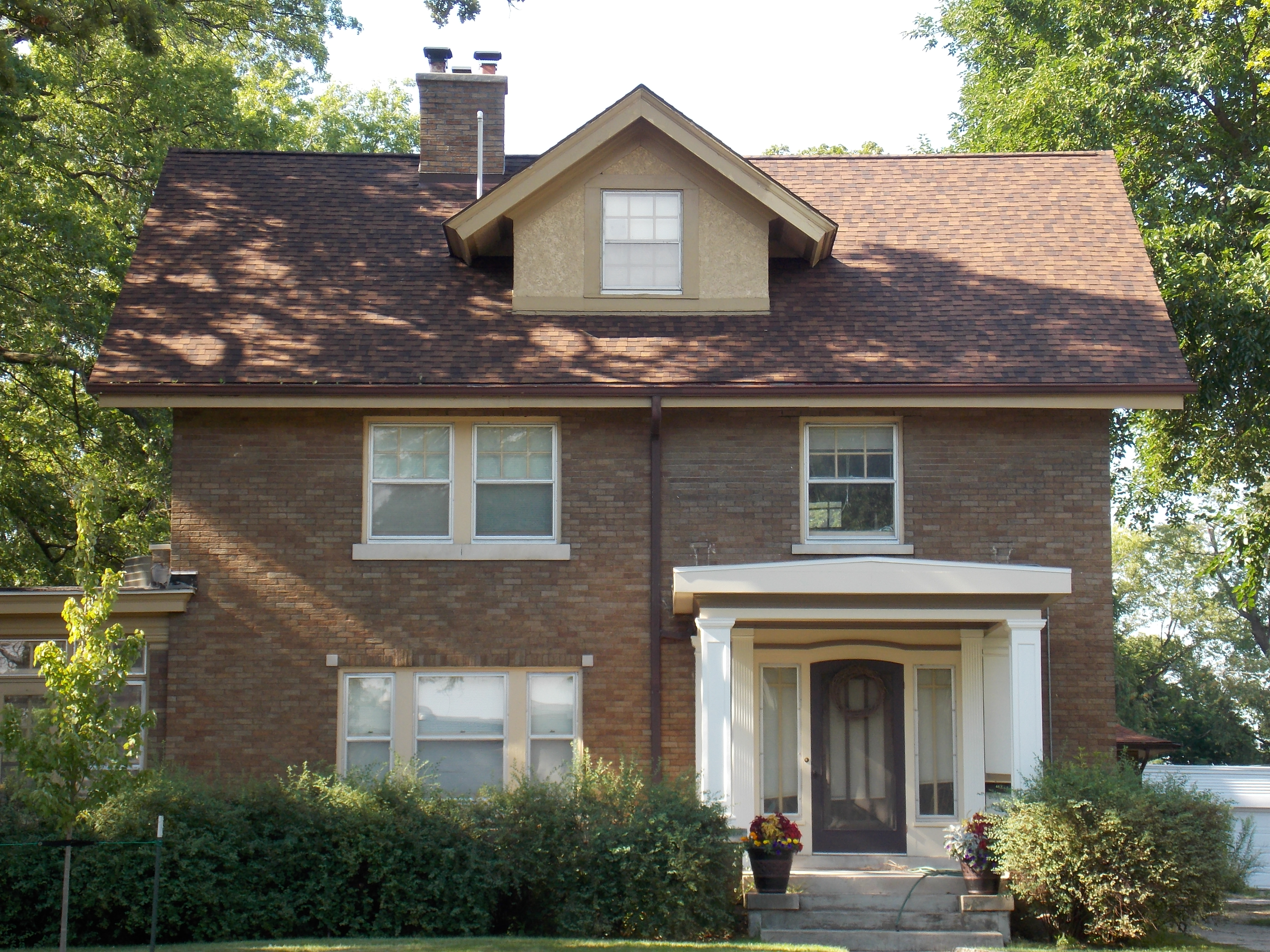
House at 822 East Locust Street

Amos Cutter, a local real estate entrepreneur, developed the Oak Lane Addition from about 1900 to 1910. Previously the land had been used for agricultural purposes. Oak Lane reflected a prosperous, middle-class reputation. It also reflected the growing American identity of the city's population in the early 20th century instead of the old European ethnic divisions that marked the neighborhoods that were developed in the 19th century. It also marked the expansion of the city away from the Mississippi River. This was possible, in part, due to the expansion of the city's streetcar lines. Locust Street, on the south side of the neighborhood, was a major streetcar route in the city.

The houses closer to Locust Street are larger, more stylish, and were home to fairly well-to-do professionals. They included William Kellenberger, who was the manager of Tri-City Litho and Printing Co.; Dr. William Alien, M.D.; Horace Roberts, who was the treasurer and general manager of the Gordon-Van Tine Company; Moritz Landauer, of the Simon & Landauer clothing store; Martin L. Parker, who was secretary and treasurer for the M.L. Parker & Company department store; and Oscar C. Woods, who was the president of a wholesale fruit and produce business the Martin-Woods Company. At the other end of Oak Lane near High Street is the location of the more modest houses that were built on narrower lots. They housed families who were headed by salesmen, clerks, and blue-collar workers.

There are two known architect-designed houses in the district. Chicago architect William A. Otis designed a Georgian Revival house at 17 Oak Lane. Davenport architect Gustav Hanssen designed the Georgian Revival Oscar Woods House at 720 East Locust Street. He may have also designed the neighboring Julia Roberts House (726) and the George Johnson House (810) based on similarities of form and facade treatment, but that cannot be confirmed.

For his part, Cutter would go on to develop the McClellan Heights neighborhood beginning in 1906. Like Oak Lane, he would move into a house in the new development as he sold and developed the other lots.

== Architecture ==
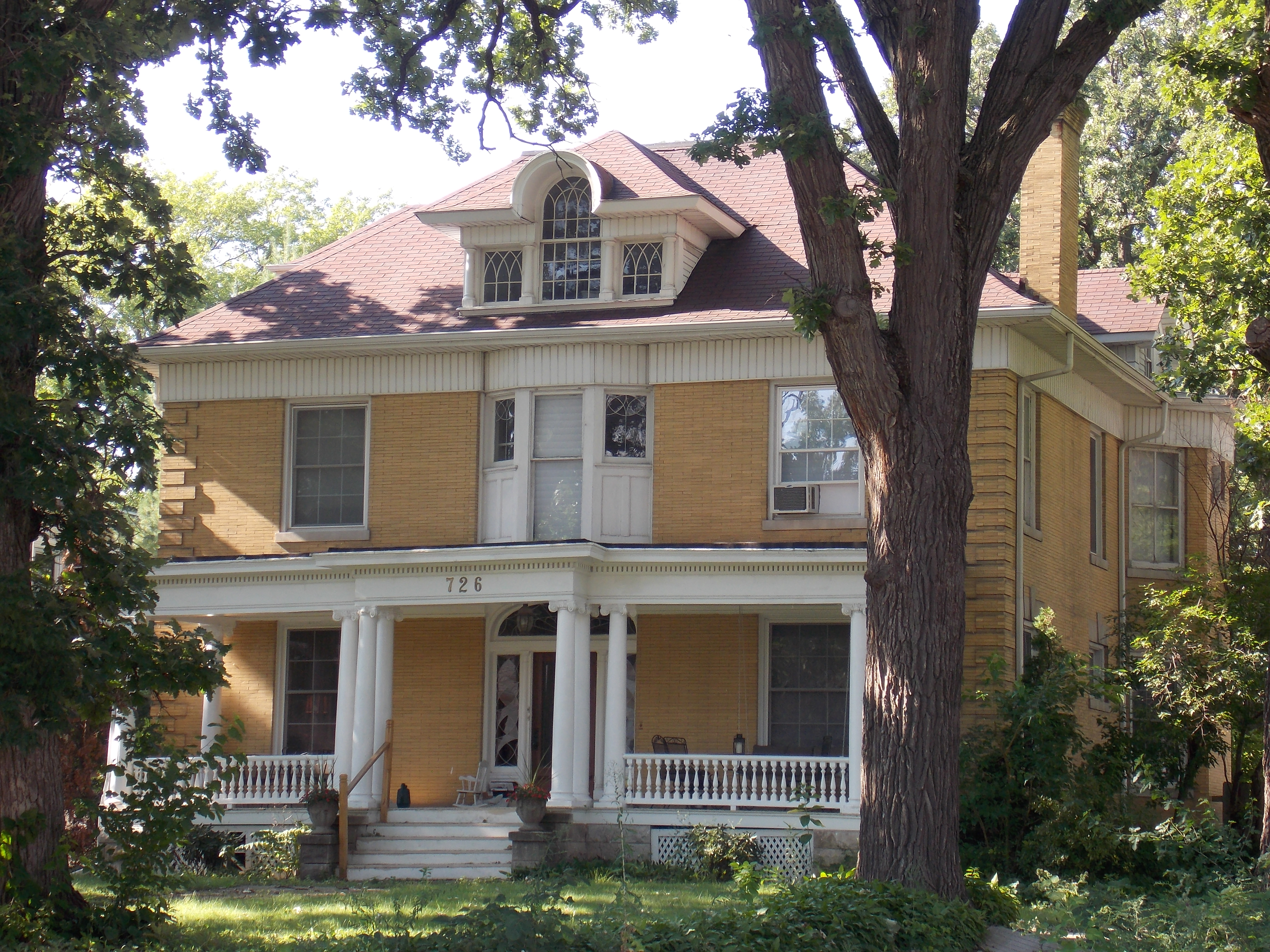
Julia Roberts House

The architecture of the Oak Lane neighborhood reflects the styles that were popular at the turn of the 20th century in Davenport. This was a period of transition from the Victorian styles, especially Queen Anne, to the Colonial Revival styles. The three prominent houses along East Locust are noteworthy examples of Davenport's Georgian Revival/Federal style houses. The oldest house in the neighborhood is an Italianate house at 10 Oak Lane that was built about 1875 and came with the property. It became Cutter's residence as the addition was being developed. The newest house in the neighborhood was built at 36 Oak Lane around 1922. It is one of the more modest houses on the north side of the development.
