= John C. Schricker House =

Historic house in Iowa, United States

- U.S. National Register of Historic Places
- U.S. Historic district – Contributing property
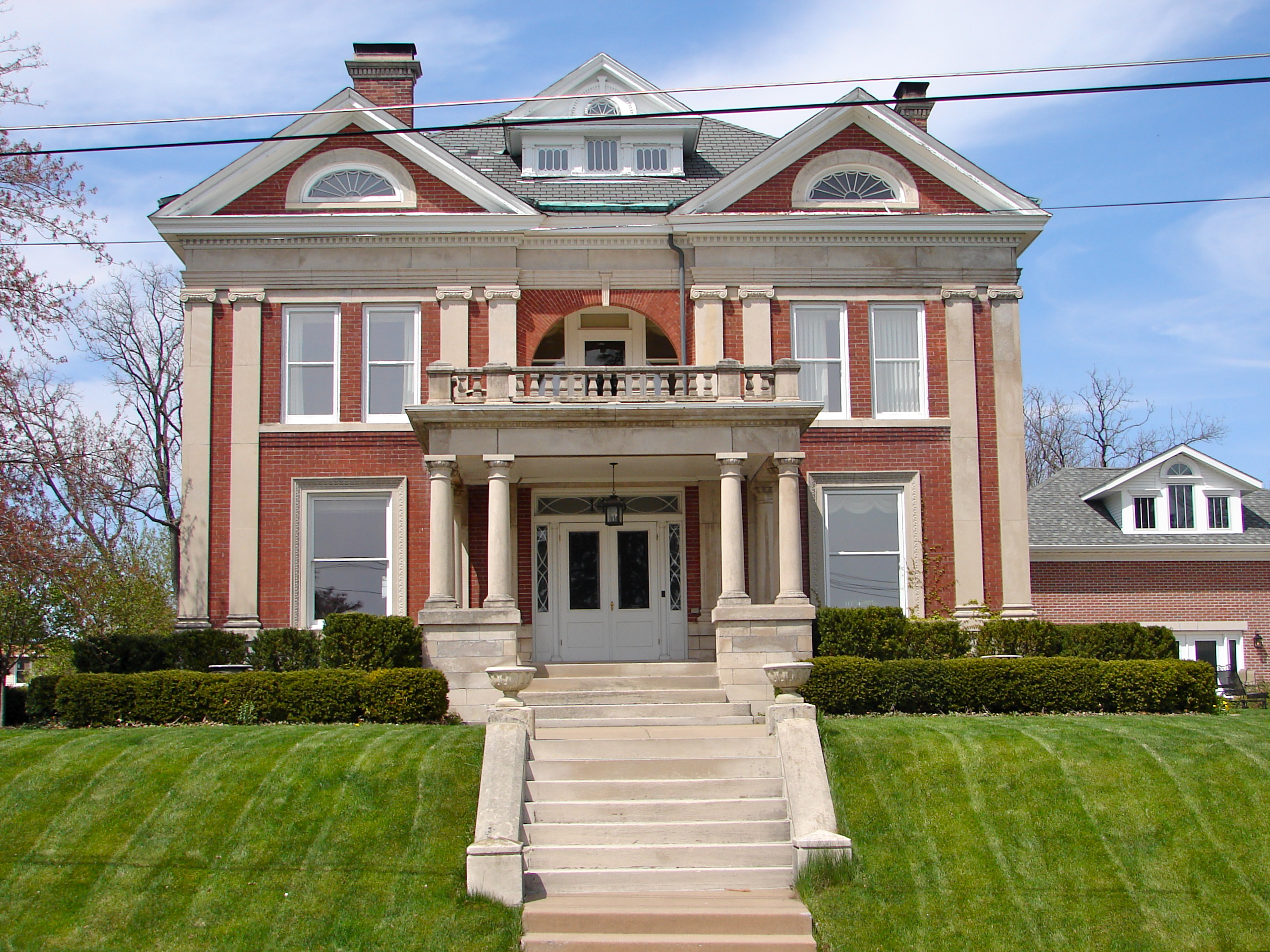

- Location within Iowa Location within the United States
- Location: 1446 Clay St. Davenport, Iowa
- Coordinates: 41°31′50″N 90°39′7″W
- Area: less than one acre
- Built: 1896
- Architect: Gustav Hanssen
- Architectural style: Georgian Revival
- Part of: Riverview Terrace Historic District (ID84000339)
- MPS: Davenport MRA
- NRHP reference No.: 83002500
- Added to NRHP: July 7, 1983

The John C. Schricker House is a historic building located in the West End of Davenport, Iowa, United States. It was individually listed on the National Register of Historic Places in 1983. The following year, it was included as contributing property in the Riverview Terrace Historic District.

== John C. Schricker ==
John Schricker was a stone and marble contractor. His work included the Dillon Memorial in downtown Davenport and the Iowa Soldiers' and Sailors' Monument on the grounds of the Iowa State Capitol in Des Moines. Schricker became a partner along with Captain Chris Schricker and F.G. Roddler in the Davenport Pearl Button Company in 1895. The company made buttons from clam shells harvested from the Mississippi River. They remained in business until the 1930s. Schricker hired Davenport architect Gustav Hanssen, who was also responsible for the rectory at Sacred Heart Cathedral and the Central Fire Station, to design his house.

== Architecture ==
The residence is a sophisticated example of the symmetrical Georgian Colonial Revival style. It features an elegant front porch held up with Doric columns and a veranda above. Paired pilasters frame the front porch and are capped with Ionic capitals. The tripartite articulation of the façade is somewhat unusual with its pedimented end bays. Double doors form the main entrance into the house and they are framed by side lights and a transom. Access to the veranda is through a rounded archway of brick.

== See also ==
- John Schricker House, Schricker's house built in 1910 that is also listed on the National Register of Historic Places.
