= Selma Schricker House =

Historic house in Iowa, United States

- U.S. Historic district – Contributing property
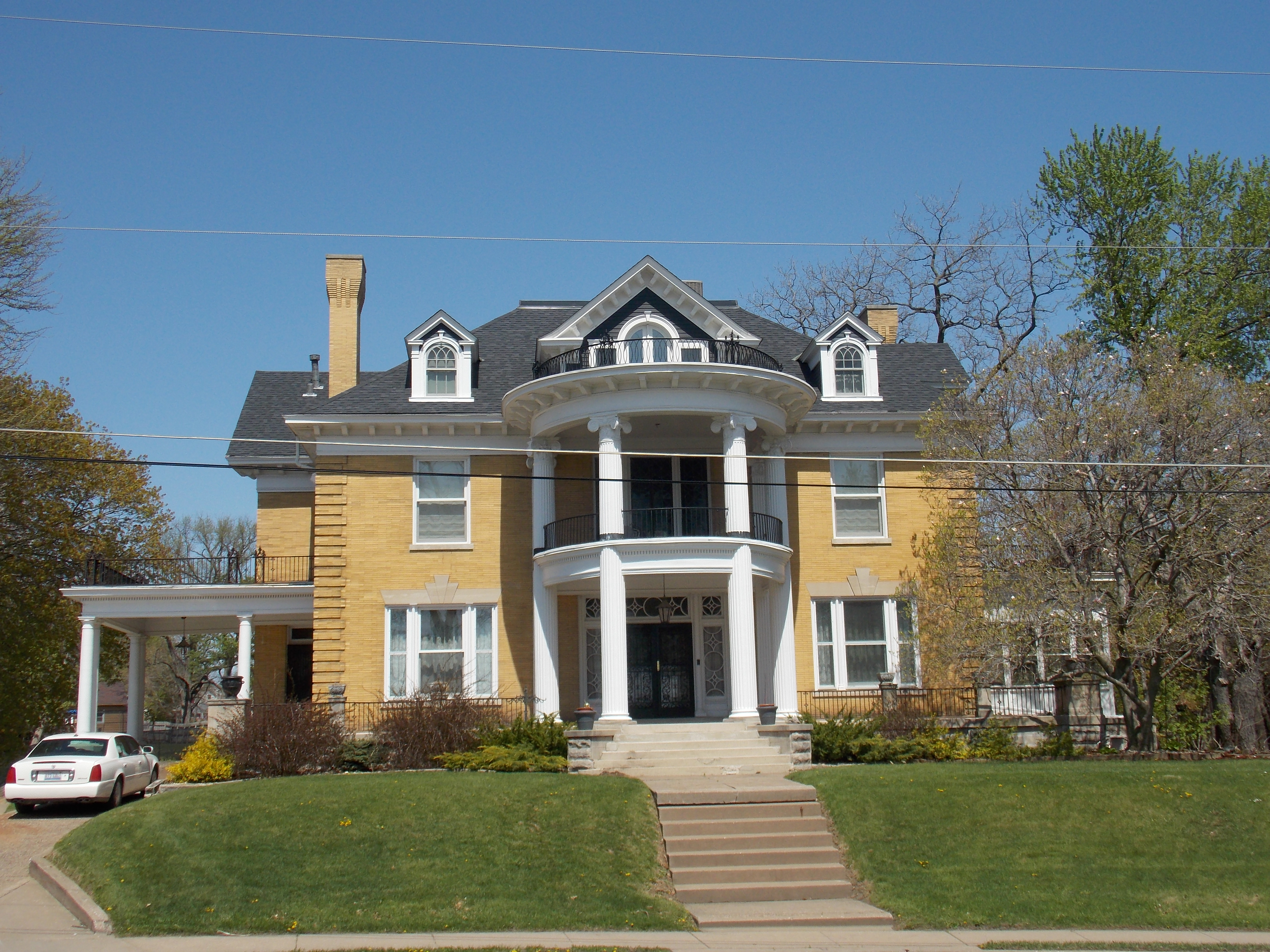

- Location within Iowa Location within the United States
- Interactive map showing the location of Selma Shricker House
- Location: 1430 Clay St. Davenport, Iowa
- Coordinates: 41°31′49.89″N 90°35′41.77″W
- Area: less than one acre
- Built: 1902
- Architect: Clausen & Burrows
- Architectural style: Georgian/Federal Revival
- Part of: Riverview Terrace Historic District (ID84000339)
- MPS: Davenport MRA
- Added to NRHP: November 1, 1984

The Selma Schricker House is a historic building located in a residential neighborhood in the West End of Davenport, Iowa, United States. At one time the house served as the official residence of Davenport's Catholic bishop. It is a contributing property in the Riverview Terrace Historic District. The district was added to the National Register of Historic Places in 1984.

== History ==
This house was built for Selma Schricker in 1902. She was the daughter of Lorenzo Schricker, a lumber baron, and his third wife Johanna. The Schricker's had lived nearby in the Marquette Heights neighborhood. Selma had been educated in the local public schools and graduated from St. Katherine's, a private preparatory school for girls in Davenport. She had this house built after her mother's death in 1898. Selma never married and died in the house in September 1931 at the age of 50. She is buried with her mother, sister and half-brother in a mausoleum in Oakdale Memorial Gardens.

The Diocese of Davenport purchased the house as the official residence of its bishop in 1933. It was the home of Bishops Henry Rohlman, Ralph Hayes, Gerald O'Keefe and William Franklin. The diocese sold the house in 1996.

Mark and Judy Westrom bought the house in November 2000 and did extensive restoration work for which they received recognition from local preservationists. The house suffered a roof fire on November 6, 2010.

== Architecture ==
The Selma Schricker House was designed by the prominent Davenport architectural firm of Clausen & Burrows. The two-story house is one of the finest examples of the Georgian Revival style in the city. The rectangular main block is capped with a bracketed cornice and a hipped roof. It features a symmetrical three-bay front, a large portico on the main façade, a sun porch on the east side, a porte-cochère on the west side, and a gabled wing off the back of the house. The exterior is composed of yellow-tan Roman brick with quoining on the corners of the main block, also in brick. It is built on a stone foundation. The house is situated on a slightly raised terrace, across the street from Riverview Terrace Park.

The front of the house is dominated by a large semi-circular, Federal inspired, portico. It features fluted columns following the Ionic order. The main entrance into the house is framed with sidelights and a transom with Adamesque tracery. There is art glass on the double-door entrance onto the upper level of the portico. Above the portico is a large central dormer with a Palladian window. It is flanked by two smaller dormers with round-arch windows. The other dormers on the house have similar windows. The porte-cochere features columns that follow the Doric order and a denticular cornice. There are also two tall, symmetrically placed, interior chimneys with corbelled caps.
