= John Schricker House =

Historic house in Iowa, United States

- U.S. National Register of Historic Places
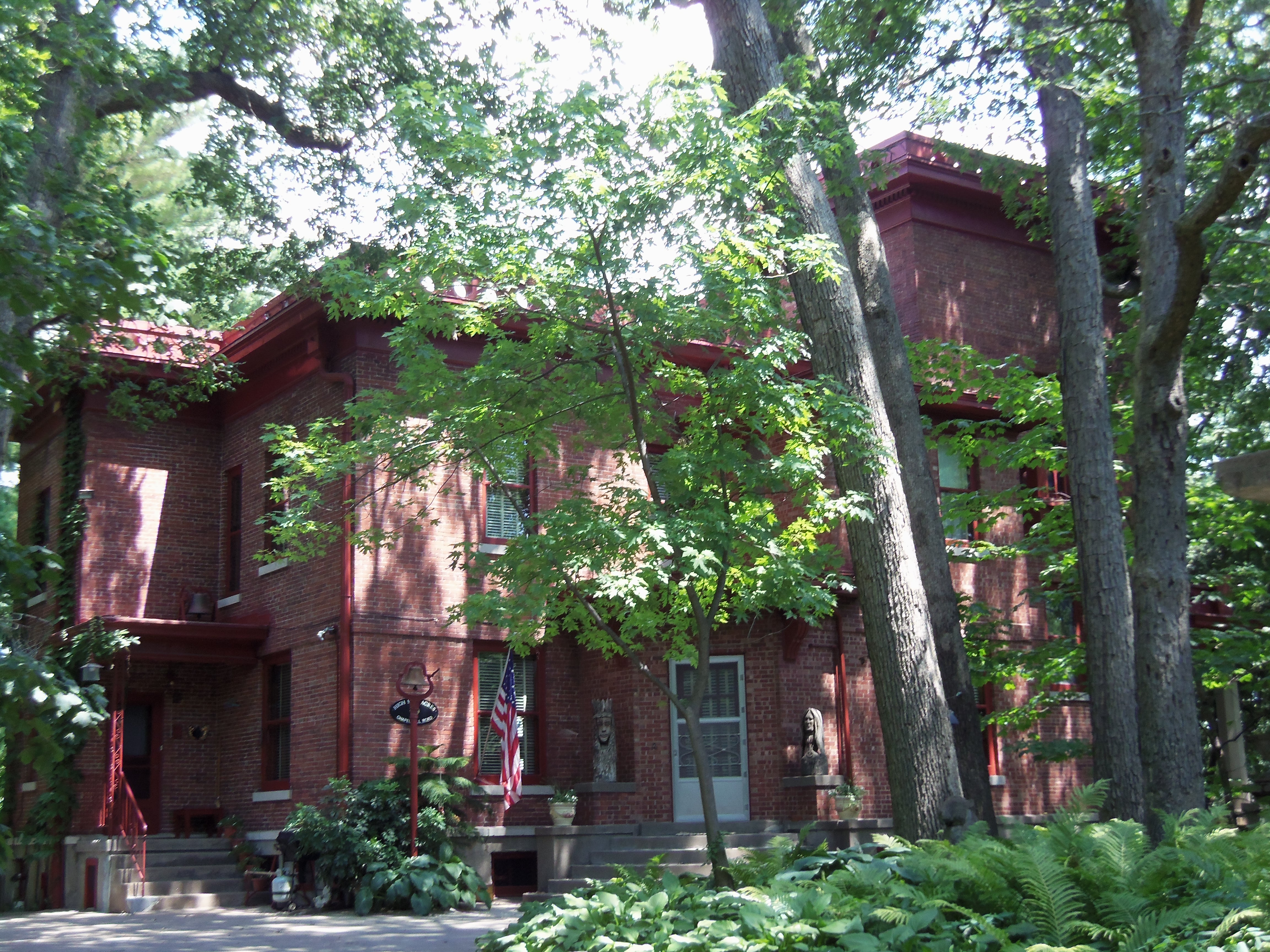

- Location within Iowa Location within the United States
- Location: 5418 Chapel Hill Rd. Davenport, Iowa
- Coordinates: 41°29′21″N 90°39′7″W
- Area: 3 acres (1.2 ha)
- Built: 1910
- Architect: Clausen & Clausen
- MPS: Davenport MRA
- NRHP reference No.: 85000776
- Added to NRHP: April 9, 1985

The John Schricker House is a historic building located in the far West End of Davenport, Iowa, United States. The house has been listed on the National Register of Historic Places since 1985.

== John C. Schricker ==
John Schricker was a stone and marble contractor. His work included the Dillon Memorial in downtown Davenport and the Iowa Soldiers' and Sailors' Monument on the grounds of the Iowa State Capitol in Des Moines. Schricker became a partner along with Captain Chris Schricker and F.G. Roddler in the Davenport Pearl Button Company in 1895. The company made buttons from clam shells harvested from the Mississippi River. They remained in business until the 1930s. Schricker hired the Davenport architectural firm of Clausen & Clausen to design this house, which was built between 1909 and 1910.

== Architecture ==
The Villa form of the Italianate style was popular in Davenport, especially in the 1870s and the 1880s. For the most part, they were built on or near the tops of the bluffs and their towers provided an excellent view of the Mississippi River Valley below. This is Schricker's second significant house in Davenport and he built it on a bluff on the far west side of the city in a place that remains fairly rural. It is one of the last expressions of the Italianate Villa found in Davenport. The house is an updated and simplified version of the style. It features a plain brick exterior and lacks the decorative window surrounds and bracketed cornices that were popular in the Victorian era. The primary decorative details are found at the house's main entrance. It features a wrought iron grill that was generally not found in Davenport until Mediterranean/Spanish Colonial Revival architecture became popular in the 1920s.

== See also ==
- John C. Schricker House, Schricker's previous house built in 1896 that is also listed on the National Register of Historic Places.
