= Buffalo, Iowa =

- City
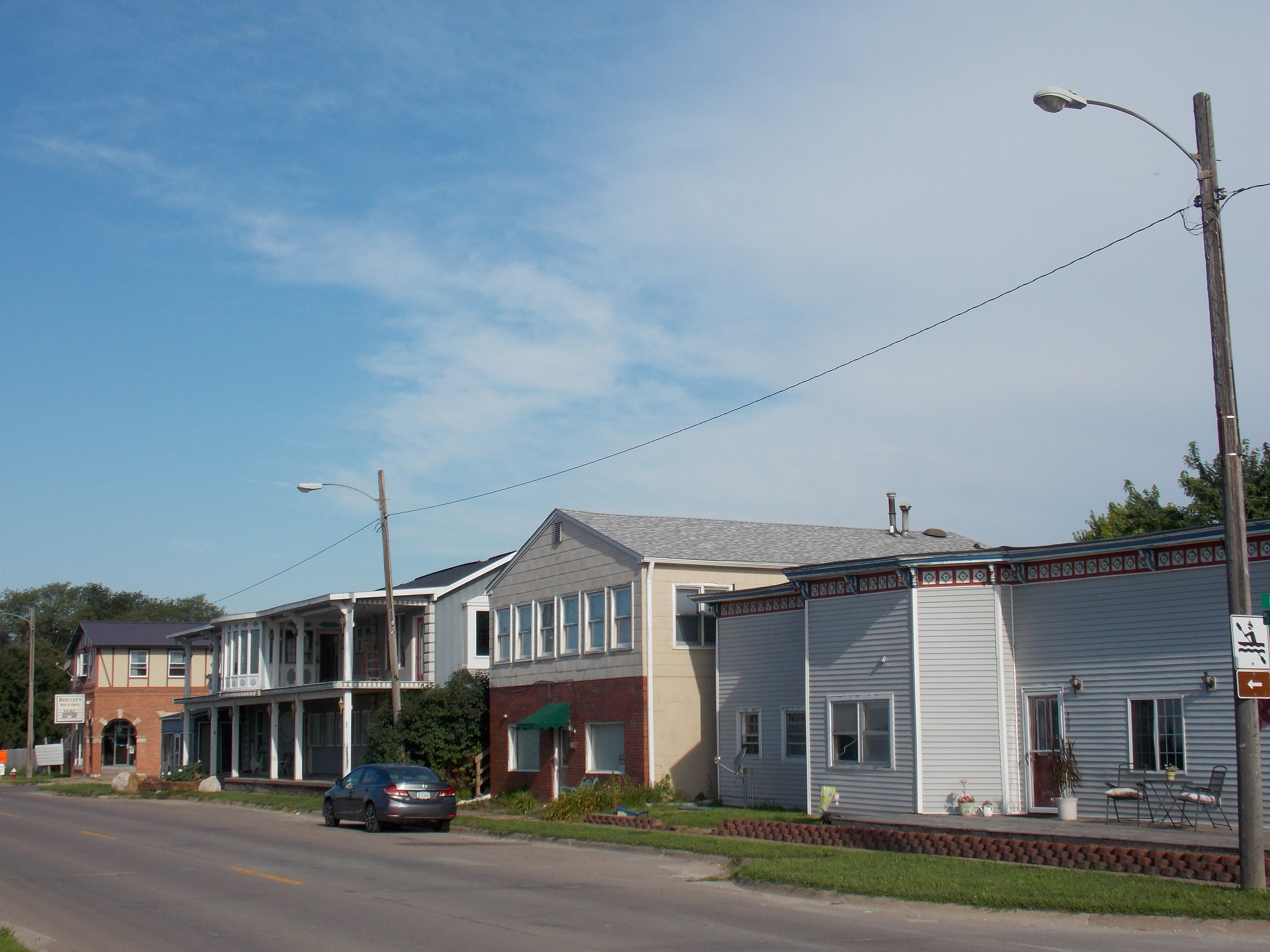
- Buildings along Front Street

- Location of Buffalo, Iowa
- Coordinates: 41°27′43″N 90°44′16″W
- Country: United States
- State: Iowa
- County: Scott

Area
  - Total: 6.81 sq mi (17.63 km^{2})
  - Land: 6.77 sq mi (17.54 km^{2})
  - Water: 0.039 sq mi (0.10 km^{2})
- Elevation: 568 ft (173 m)

Population (2020)
  - Total: 1,176
  - Density: 173.7/sq mi (67.06/km^{2})
- Time zone: UTC-6 (Central (CST))
  - Summer (DST): UTC-5 (CDT)
- ZIP code: 52728
- Area code: 563
- FIPS code: 19-09235
- GNIS feature ID: 2393454
- Website: www.buffaloiowa.org

Buffalo is a city in Scott County, Iowa, United States. The population was 1,176 at the 2020 census. Buffalo is located on the Mississippi River. The city is a part of the Quad Cities Metropolitan Area.

== History ==
Steamship captain Benjamin W. Clark settled the area of Buffalo in 1833. It was claimed following the 1833 Black Hawk Purchase which opened the region to non-native settlers. In 1836, Clark sold a 2/3 interest in 90 acres of land to Captain E.A. Mix and Dr. Pillsbury and collectively the three men platted the town of Buffalo after Buffalo, New York. This was the first town to be platted in Scott County. The town was hopeful for a county seat but found itself on the Western edge of Scott County after its districting in 1837. This made the town unsuitable for the county seat compared to the centrally located Davenport.

The Buffalo County Public School District #1 opened in the town in 1836. Coal deposits were discovered in 1834 and sold to passing steamboats. A post office was opened in the town in 1836. The first criminal trial in Scott County was held in Buffalo in 1836 for petty theft.

== Geography ==
According to the United States Census Bureau, the city has a total area of 6.49 square miles (16.81 km^{2}), of which 6.45 square miles (16.71 km^{2}) is land and 0.04 square miles (0.10 km^{2}) is water. This is the only place where the Mississippi River runs chiefly from east to west instead of south or southwesterly.

== Demographics ==
Historical populations
| Year | Pop. | ±% |
|---|---|---|
| 1870 | 368 | — |
| 1880 | 400 | +8.7% |
| 1890 | 379 | −5.2% |
| 1900 | 372 | −1.8% |
| 1910 | 456 | +22.6% |
| 1920 | 487 | +6.8% |
| 1930 | 547 | +12.3% |
| 1940 | 588 | +7.5% |
| 1950 | 695 | +18.2% |
| 1960 | 1,088 | +56.5% |
| 1970 | 1,513 | +39.1% |
| 1980 | 1,567 | +3.6% |
| 1990 | 1,250 | −20.2% |
| 2000 | 1,321 | +5.7% |
| 2010 | 1,270 | −3.9% |
| 2020 | 1,176 | −7.4% |
Source:"U.S. Census website". United States Census Bureau. and Iowa Data Center; Source: U.S. Decennial Census

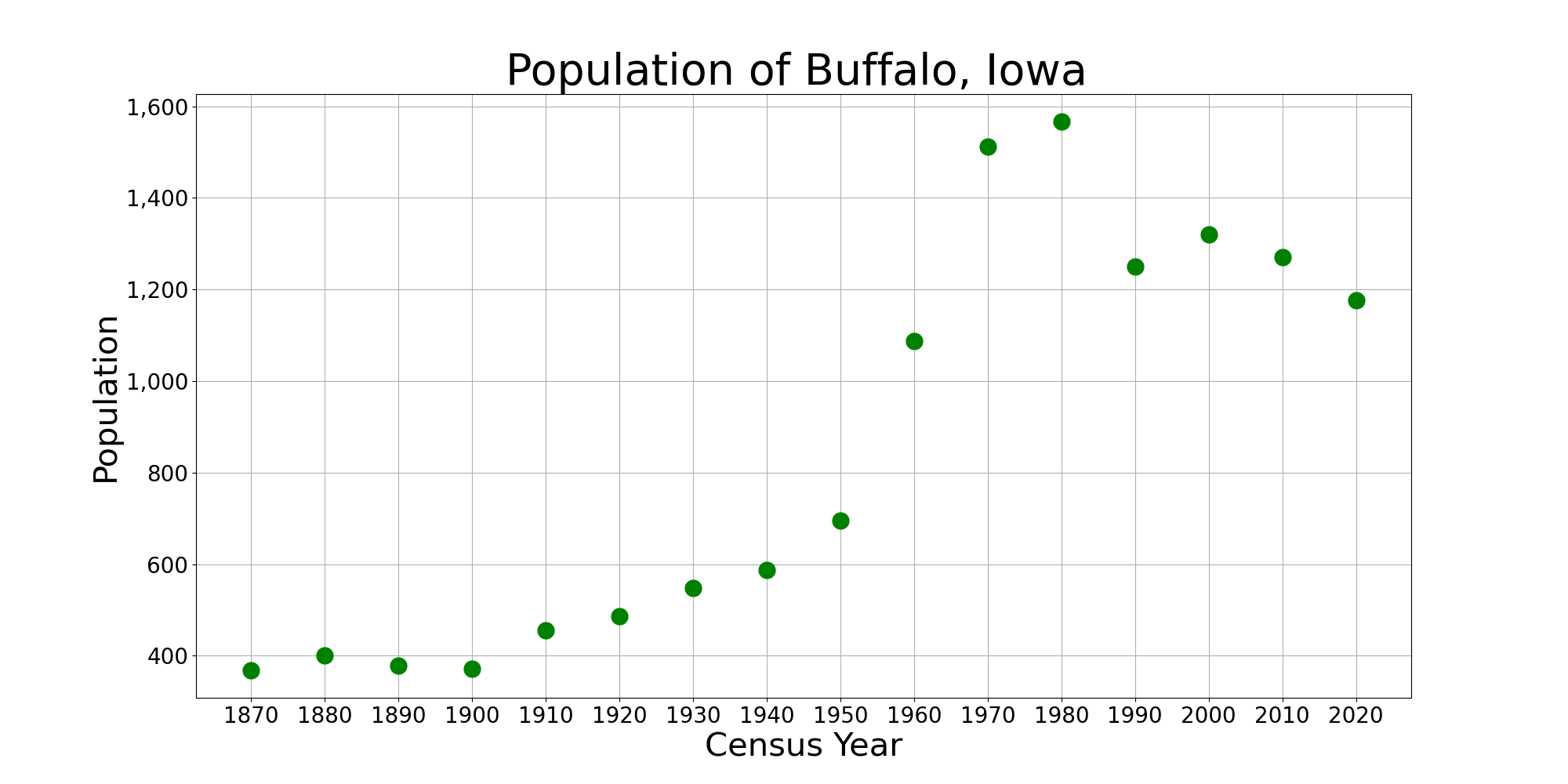
The population of Buffalo, Iowa from US census data

=== 2020 census ===
As of the 2020 census, Buffalo had a population of 1,176, with 458 households and 329 families. The population density was 173.7 inhabitants per square mile (67.1/km^{2}). There were 499 housing units at an average density of 73.7 per square mile (28.5/km^{2}).

The median age was 41.3 years. 23.7% of residents were under the age of 18 and 15.7% were 65 years of age or older. 26.3% of residents were under the age of 20; 3.5% were between the ages of 20 and 24; 25.0% were from 25 to 44; and 29.5% were from 45 to 64. The gender makeup was 49.9% male and 50.1% female. For every 100 females, there were 99.7 males, and for every 100 females age 18 and over there were 101.1 males age 18 and over.

Of the 458 households, 31.2% had children under the age of 18 living with them, 50.7% were married-couple households, 7.9% were cohabitating couples, 22.3% had a female householder with no spouse or partner present, and 19.2% had a male householder with no spouse or partner present. About 28.2% were non-family households, 20.9% were made up of individuals, and 9.4% had someone living alone who was 65 years of age or older.

There were 499 housing units, of which 8.2% were vacant. The homeowner vacancy rate was 0.8% and the rental vacancy rate was 6.1%. 0.0% of residents lived in urban areas, while 100.0% lived in rural areas.

Racial composition as of the 2020 census
| Race | Number | Percent |
|---|---|---|
| White | 1,060 | 90.1% |
| Black or African American | 8 | 0.7% |
| American Indian and Alaska Native | 2 | 0.2% |
| Asian | 6 | 0.5% |
| Native Hawaiian and Other Pacific Islander | 0 | 0.0% |
| Some other race | 13 | 1.1% |
| Two or more races | 87 | 7.4% |
| Hispanic or Latino (of any race) | 70 | 6.0% |

=== 2010 census ===
As of the census of 2010, there were 1,270 people, 499 households, and 336 families living in the city. The population density was 196.9 inhabitants per square mile (76.0/km^{2}). There were 527 housing units at an average density of 81.7 per square mile (31.5/km^{2}). The racial makeup of the city was 97.2% White, 0.5% African American, 0.1% Native American, 0.2% Asian, 0.3% from other races, and 1.7% from two or more races. Hispanic or Latino of any race were 2.5% of the population.

There were 499 households, of which 34.7% had children under the age of 18 living with them, 51.7% were married couples living together, 10.2% had a female householder with no husband present, 5.4% had a male householder with no wife present, and 32.7% were non-families. 26.3% of all households were made up of individuals, and 12.2% had someone living alone who was 65 years of age or older. The average household size was 2.55 and the average family size was 3.09.

The median age in the city was 37.9 years. 25.5% of residents were under the age of 18; 7.2% were between the ages of 18 and 24; 28.4% were from 25 to 44; 25.7% were from 45 to 64; and 13.1% were 65 years of age or older. The gender makeup of the city was 50.9% male and 49.1% female.

=== 2000 census ===
As of the census of 2000, there were 1,321 people, 489 households, and 356 families living in the city. The population density was 219.5 inhabitants per square mile (84.7/km^{2}). There were 516 housing units at an average density of 85.8 per square mile (33.1/km^{2}). The racial makeup of the city was 95.91% White, 1.29% African American, 0.53% Native American, 0.15% Asian, 0.91% from other races, and 1.21% from two or more races. Hispanic or Latino of any race were 3.86% of the population.

There were 489 households, out of which 33.7% had children under the age of 18 living with them, 60.5% were married couples living together, 8.4% had a female householder with no husband present, and 27.0% were non-families. 23.5% of all households were made up of individuals, and 11.0% had someone living alone who was 65 years of age or older. The average household size was 2.70 and the average family size was 3.16.

27.3% were under the age of 18, 8.0% from 18 to 24, 29.5% from 25 to 44, 22.6% from 45 to 64, and 12.5% were 65 years of age or older. The median age was 35 years. For every 100 females, there were 103.9 males. For every 100 females age 18 and over, there were 96.7 males.

The median income for a household in the city was $44,250, and the median income for a family was $49,808. Males had a median income of $37,100 versus $21,188 for females. The per capita income for the city was $21,957. About 4.4% of families and 5.9% of the population were below the poverty line, including 3.8% of those under age 18 and 8.6% of those age 65 or over.

== Education ==
Davenport Community School District serves Buffalo. Zoned schools include Buffalo Elementary School, Walcott Intermediate School, and Davenport West High School.

== Notable person ==
Colby Lopez, a professional wrestler signed to WWE under the ring name Seth Rollins, was raised in Buffalo.

== See also ==
- Buffalo High School, listed on the National Register of Historic Places in Scott County, Iowa
