= Central Fire Station (Davenport, Iowa) =

- U.S. National Register of Historic Places
- U.S. Historic district – Contributing property
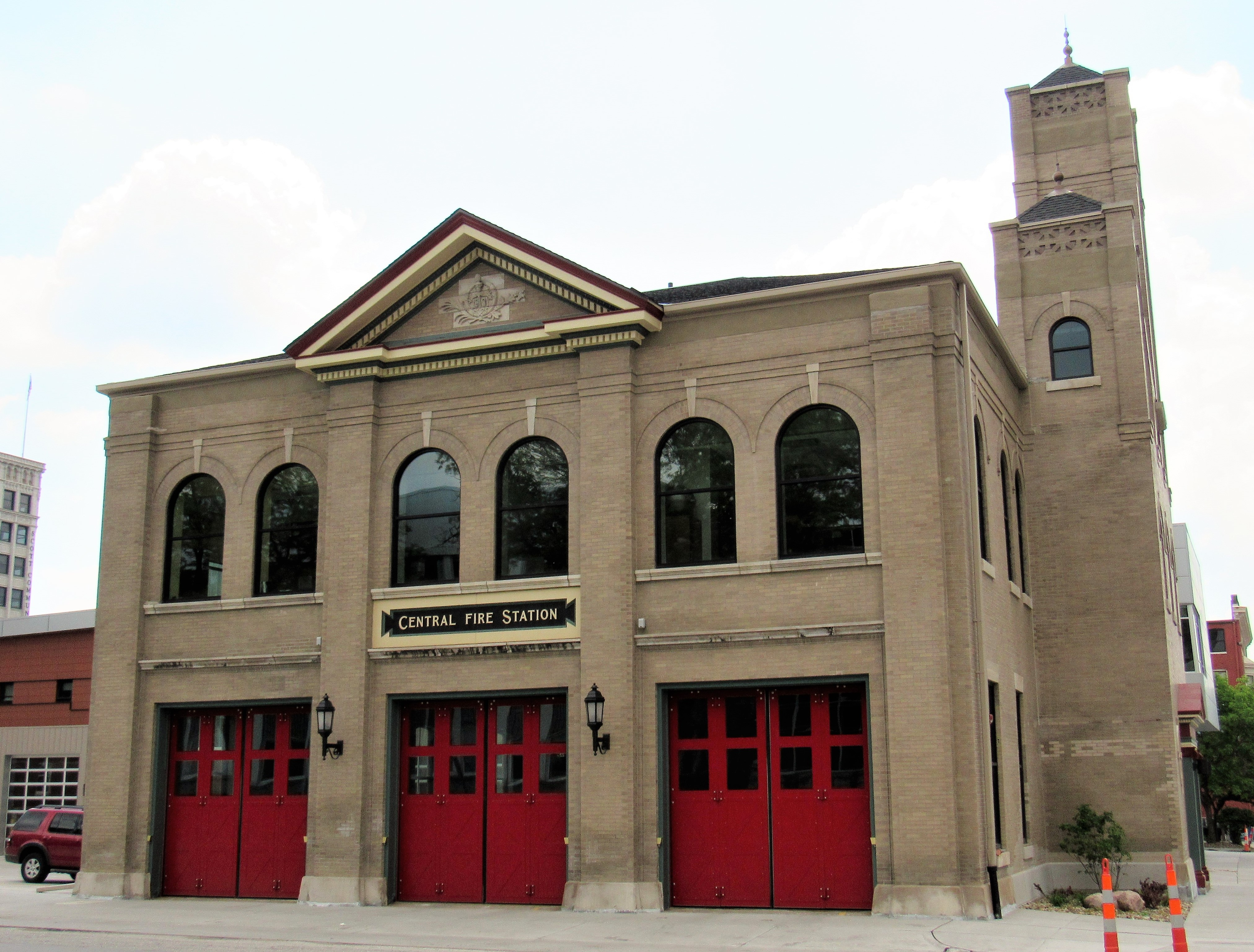

- Location within Iowa Location within the United States
- Location: 331 Scott St. Davenport, Iowa
- Coordinates: 41°31′23″N 90°34′47″W
- Area: less than one acre
- Built: 1902
- Architectural style: Italianate
- Part of: Davenport Downtown Commercial Historic District (ID100005546)
- NRHP reference No.: 82002638
- Added to NRHP: April 22, 1982

The Central Fire Station is located in downtown Davenport, Iowa, United States and serves as the headquarters of the Davenport Fire Department, as well as the downtown fire station. Built from 1901 to 1902, the original building is the oldest active fire station west of the Mississippi River. It was individually listed on the National Register of Historic Places in 1982. In 2020 it was included as a contributing property in the Davenport Downtown Commercial Historic District.

== History ==
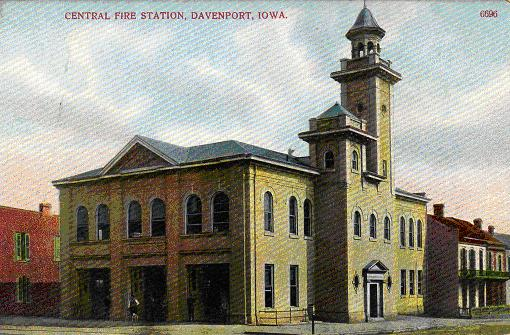
Postcard showing the Central Fire Station not long after its completion

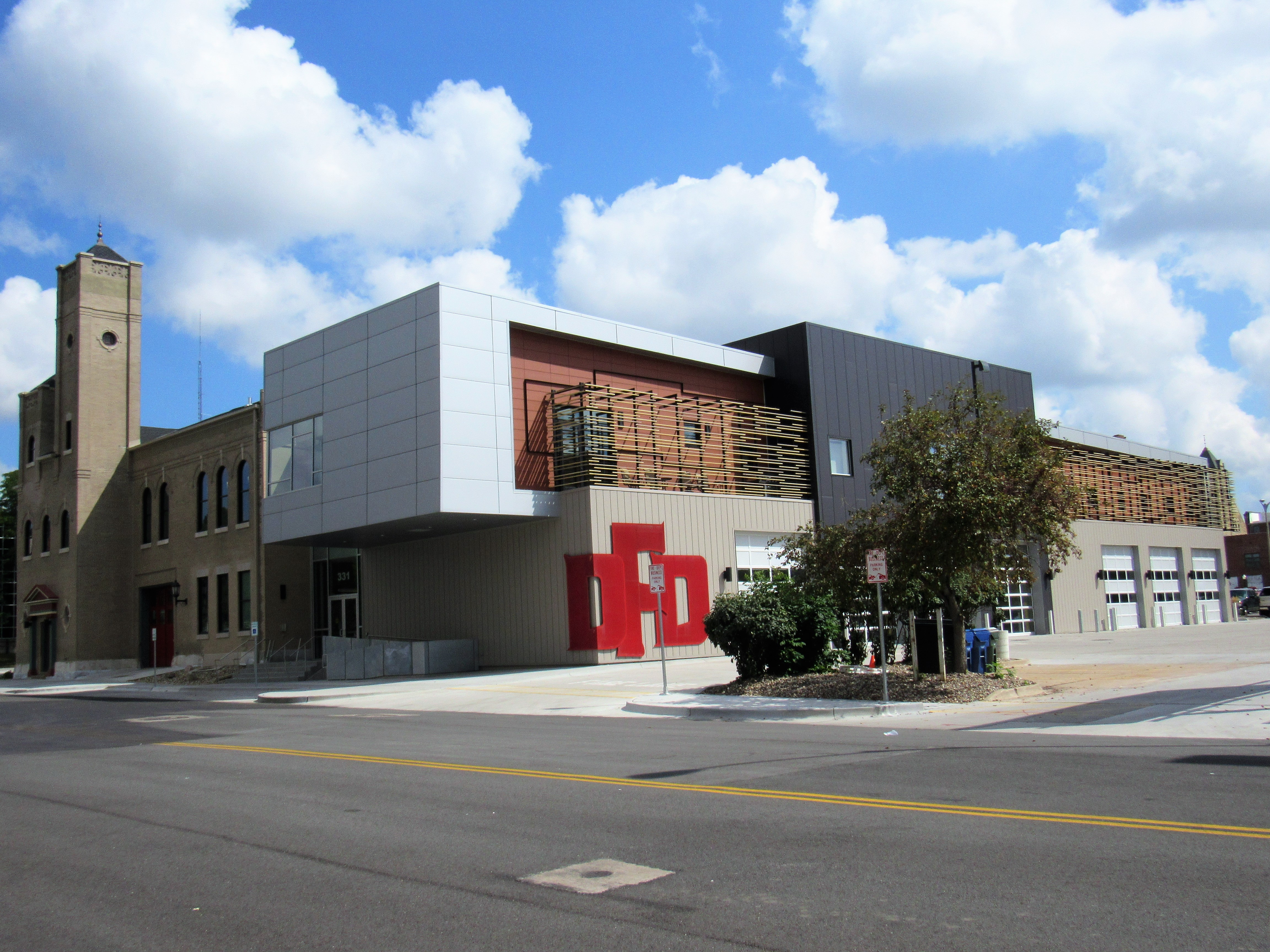
Rear view of the fire station

The first group of volunteer firefighters in Davenport were organized in 1856 and called the Independent Fire Engine and Hose Company. The city's early firefighting corps were all volunteer hook and ladder and hose companies, which were paid a small fee to extinguish a fire, and competed against one another for business. They were located throughout the city in makeshift quarters and generally possessed poor equipment. By 1880 the city determined it needed a professional, paid fire department.

The Davenport City Council authorized the formation of a municipal fire department in 1882. Marsh Noe was the first fire chief and twelve men made up the first paid fire department. The city's first firehouse, Hose Station No. 1, had been built on Perry Street in 1877 for the Fire King Engine 2nd Hose Company. Before the turn of the 20th-century, the city built other small hose stations throughout the city.

By 1901 the city decided it needed a new and larger fire station downtown. At this time there were six hose companies located throughout the city, a citywide alarm system was in place as well as a fire hydrant network. The city and its buildings in the downtown area continued to grow in size and numbers. The fire department also grew in size so a larger station was needed to care for all of these realities. Local architect Gustav Hanssen was contracted to build the new station. He had designed several homes in the city including Sacred Heart Rectory, which is also on the National Register of Historic Places. The location of a double engine firehouse across West Fourth Street from the Scott County Court House was selected as the location for the new building. The building was opened in 1902, which makes it the oldest active fire station west of the Mississippi River. It was built at a cost of $21,000. As the city and the fire department grew a two-story annex was added to the rear of the building around 1940. It added three additional truck bays.

The building continues to serve as a fire station although it had space and access problems. The station itself houses Engine 1, Engine 2, Truck 1 (also known as Bubba II, or "The Big Show"), and District Chief 1. In 2015 the city addressed the space problems of the facility. It announced in February that a rectangular two-story addition would be built with five fire engine bays to the east of the original fire station, creating an L-shaped structure. It replaces the addition built in the 1940s, which was torn down. The original station has been maintained and houses the fireboat, air van, and brush rig on the first floor, and the second-floor houses the administrative offices for the department. Access issues were also addressed by the new addition.

== Architecture ==
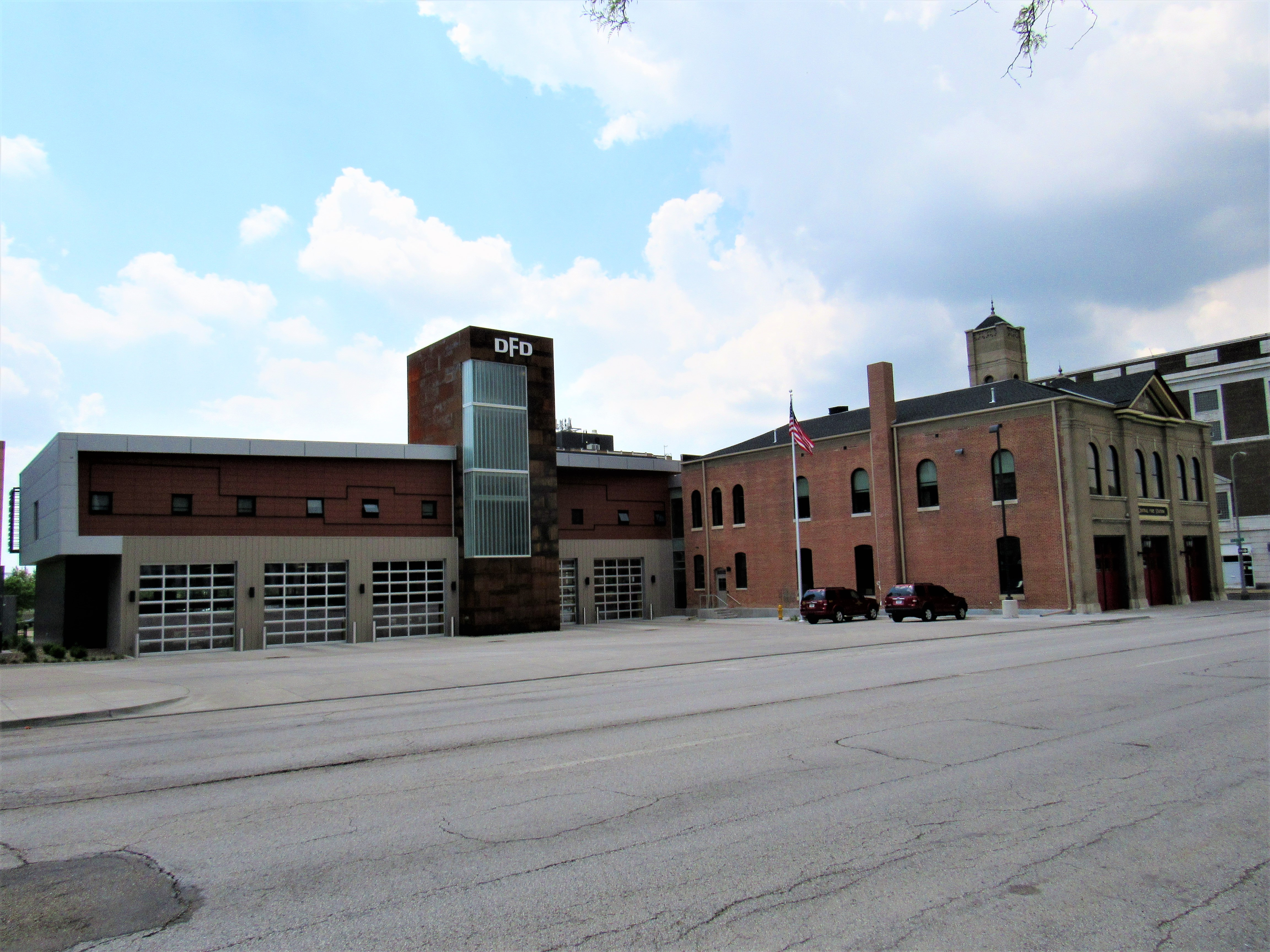
The 2016 building on the left and the 1902 building on the right.

Davenport's fire stations have employed the Italianate style and the Central Fire Station is no exception. It also employs elements of the Neoclassical style as well. The historic building is a two-story structure and features three bays across its main façade, which faces West Fourth Street. Two towers flank the main entrance, which is on Scott Street. The Italianate elements are found in the hose tower and the low hipped roof. The Neoclassical elements are found in the pedimented entrance and in the round-arched window heads and their simplified keystones.

The main floor of the building is an open 57-by-64-foot (17 by 20 m) room with no supporting posts. When it was built it could hold four hose wagons and had stalls for ten horses that pulled the wagons. The stalls were paved with vitrified brick, and each had its own sewer connect. There was also a ventilation system to help eliminate odors and flies.

The taller tower had a bell loft and cornice that were removed sometime before 1953. It was then made to look like the shorter tower. A bell, cast in 1869 by Michael Donahue, contained 200 silver dollars to give it a proper ring and was hung in the tall tower. The tower, then as now, was used to hang the fire hoses to dry.

Historically, the second floor contained the chief's bedroom, office, and bathroom. There was also a room for a switchboard and repeater. The rest of the second floor was taken up by a dormitory, locker room and bathroom for the firefighters.

Three additions have been added to the building over the years. The first is attached to the back of the building facing Scott Street and was added around 1940. It was a brick structure that contained a three-bay garage with a second floor above. It featured elements of the Art Deco style. The second addition is a small, one-story attachment on the northwest corner of the building that was added in 1950. Both the c. 1940 and the 1950 additions were removed when the 2016 addition was built. The newest addition designed by the Boston-based firm, The Galante Architecture Studio, exhibits elements of Modern architecture while linking colors and materials to the original building.
