= Gunnard Twyner =

American football player (born 1973)

Millikin Big Blue
- Title: Offensive coordinator

Personal information
- Born: July 14, 1973 (age 53); Bettendorf, Iowa, U.S.
- Listed height: 5 ft 10 in (1.78 m)
- Listed weight: 165 lb (75 kg)

Career information
- High school: Pleasant Valley (Riverdale, Iowa)
- College: Western Illinois
- NFL draft: 1996: undrafted

Career history

Playing
- Cincinnati Bengals (1996–1997); New Orleans Saints (1997–1998); Jacksonville Jaguars (2000)*; Tampa Bay Storm (2001–2002); Buffalo Destroyers (2003); Columbus Destroyers (2004)
- * Offseason or practice squad member only

Coaching
- Indianapolis Colts (2009) NFL minority coaching intern; Western Illinois (2010–2013) Wide receivers coach; Dodge City (2013–2015) Wide receivers coach; Lafayette (2017–2018) Wide receivers coach; Indianapolis Colts (2019) Offensive quality control coach; Eastern Illinois (2022) Tight ends coach; Midwestern State (2023–2024) Wide receivers coach; Millikin (2025–present) Offensive coordinator
- Stats at Pro Football Reference

Gunnard Winston Twyner (born July 14, 1973) is an American football coach and former professional wide receiver. He is the offensive coordinator for Millikin University, a position he has held since 2025. He played in the National Football League (NFL) for the Cincinnati Bengals and New Orleans Saints. He played college football for the Western Illinois Leathernecks. He also played in the Arena Football League (AFL) for the Tampa Bay Storm and Buffalo Destroyers/Columbus Destroyers.

Twyner has spent time as a coach for the Indianapolis Colts. Prior to that he was a coach at Dodge City Community College.
