= Forest Grove School =

Forest Grove School may refer to:

Canada

- École Forest Grove School of Forest Grove, Saskatoon, a part of Saskatoon Public Schools

United States

- Forest Grove School of the Forest Grove School District (Oklahoma)
- Forest Grove High School in Oregon
- Forest Grove School No. 5, a school building in rural Scott County, Iowa, listed on the NRHP
