= Anything Other Than Naked =

Fashion book by Glen R. Sondag

- Hardbook Edition cover
- Author: Glen R. Sondag
- Subject: Self-help, Fashion
- Published: February 14, 2011, Landgon Street Press
- Publication place: United States
- Media type: Print (paperback) eBook
- Pages: 100 pp (first edition, paperback)
- ISBN: 1-936183-83-8

Anything Other Than Naked - a guide for men on how to dress properly for every occasion, is a men's fashion self-help book published in January 2011 by Langdon Street Press. Written by business professional and former U.S. Air Force Captain Glen R. Sondag, the book was originally intended as a guide for Sondag's four sons. It instead turned into an illustrated guide on fashion basics, such as dressing for body type, choosing suits and accessories, fabrics, rules of office fashion, and clothing brand selection. As of March 2011 it is available in paperback and as an eBook.

== Overview ==
=== History ===
Sondag claims he first developed his fashion sense and love of clothes from his mother, a skilled seamstress who made all her own clothes, and many of his. At a young age she taught him about fabrics, tailoring, fit, clothing construction, and dressing appropriately. Sondag, who graduated with a B.A. from the University of St. Thomas, worked at a men's clothing retailer while attending graduate school. While there he spent most of his earnings on clothing. Following service as a captain in the U.S. Air Force, Sondag joined Merrill Lynch as a financial advisor in 1972, and formed The Sondag Group in Northbrook, Illinois with his son Michael in 1997. Sondag, who has been married to the same woman since 1969, claims he originally began writing Anything Other Than Naked as a "do's and don'ts" dressing guide for his four sons.

=== Content ===
The book contains illustrated chapters on clothing tips for men, such as selecting and wearing each clothing item, matching suits, coats, shirts, and ties, choosing accessories, laundering, grooming, flattering your individual body type, and basic rules of office fashion (shoes should be darker than the suit, etc.). The book also covers what fashions are appropriate for different situations.

=== Publishing history ===
The book was first made available in an eBook format on January 25, 2011 by book retailer Barnes & Noble. A paperback version was published by Langdon Street Press (English only) on February 14, 2011.

On January 18, 2011 Sondag was interviewed by Elizabeth Hamilton-Guarino of Best Ever You on the book in a special one-hour show. He is also a regular fashion columnist for Best Ever You, a fashion and well-being blog. The book was reviewed in Crain's Chicago Business on March 14, 2011.

== See also ==
- Dress code (Western)
- History of Western fashion
- Clothing
