= Panorama Park, Iowa =

- City
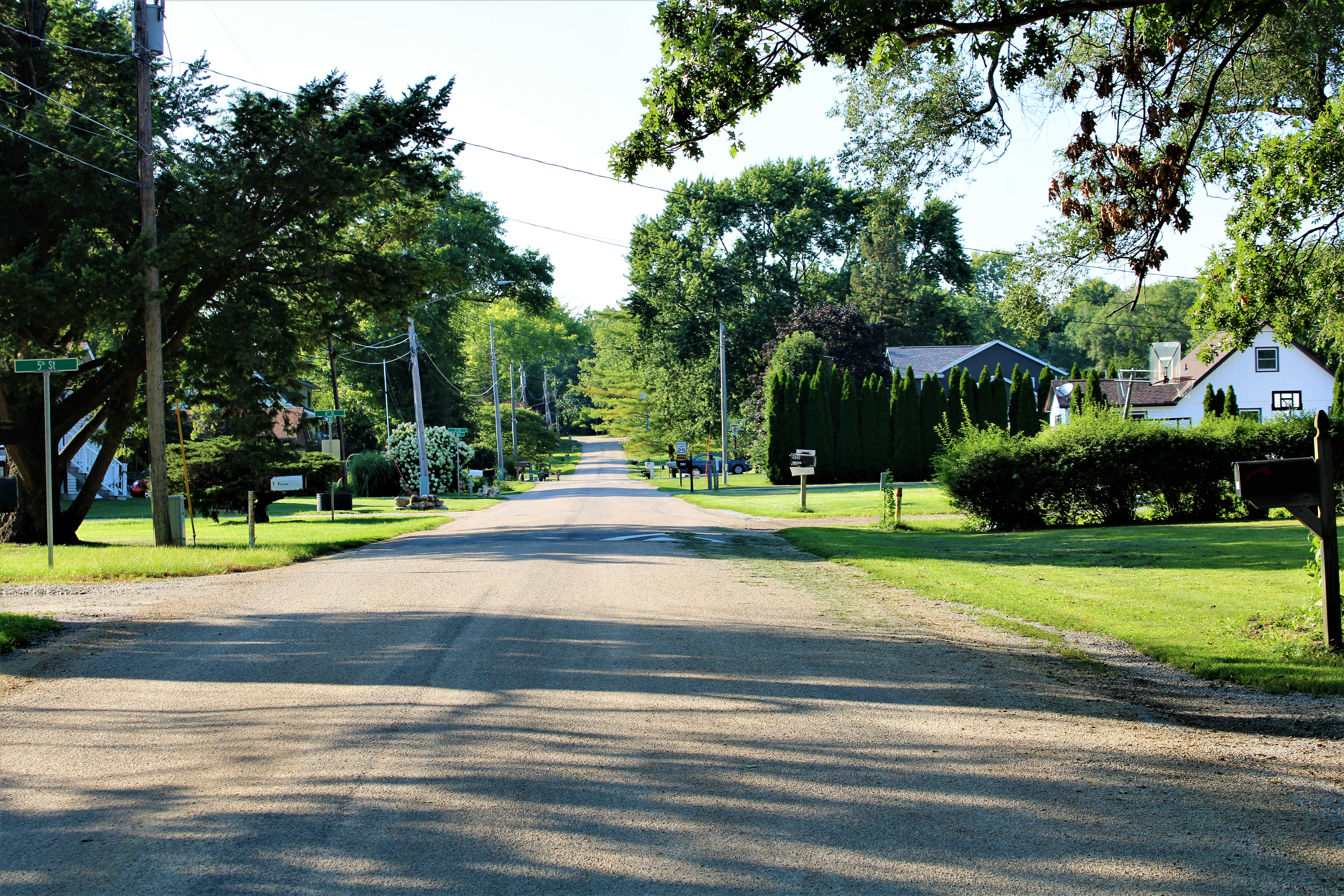
- Park Avenue, the main street in Panorama Park

- Location of Panorama Park, Iowa
- Coordinates: 41°33′21″N 90°27′14″W
- Country: United States
- State: Iowa
- County: Scott

Government
  - Type: Municipal

Area
  - Total: 0.062 sq mi (0.16 km^{2})
  - Land: 0.062 sq mi (0.16 km^{2})
  - Water: 0 sq mi (0.00 km^{2})
- Elevation: 614 ft (187 m)

Population (2020)
  - Total: 139
  - Density: 2,305.9/sq mi (890.32/km^{2})
- Time zone: UTC-6 (Central (CST))
  - Summer (DST): UTC-5 (CDT)
- ZIP code: 52722
- Area code: 563
- FIPS code: 19-61365
- GNIS feature ID: 2396138
- Website: panoramaparkiowa.com

Panorama Park is a city in Scott County, Iowa, United States. The population was 139 at the time of the 2020 census. It is surrounded by Bettendorf, and is part of the Quad Cities metro area.

== Geography ==
According to the United States Census Bureau, the city has a total area of 0.05 square miles (0.13 km^{2}), all land.

== History ==
Panorama Park exists due to a road maintenance controversy from the early 1950s. The city of Bettendorf ignored requests to maintain the thoroughfare known as Park Avenue, a dirt road which was often left icy or muddy. The neighborhood surrounding Park Avenue decided to incorporate the community as Panorama Park in an effort to pay for the road's maintenance directly. Since its 1953 incorporation, the residents of Panorama Park have maintained their independence, paying lower taxes than residents of the surrounding Bettendorf.

== Demographics ==
Historical populations
Year	Pop.	±%
1960	140	—
1970	219	+56.4%
1980	145	−33.8%
1990	127	−12.4%
2000	111	−12.6%
2010	129	+16.2%
2020	139	+7.8%
Source:"American FactFinder". United States Census Bureau. and Iowa Data Center; Source: U.S. Decennial Census

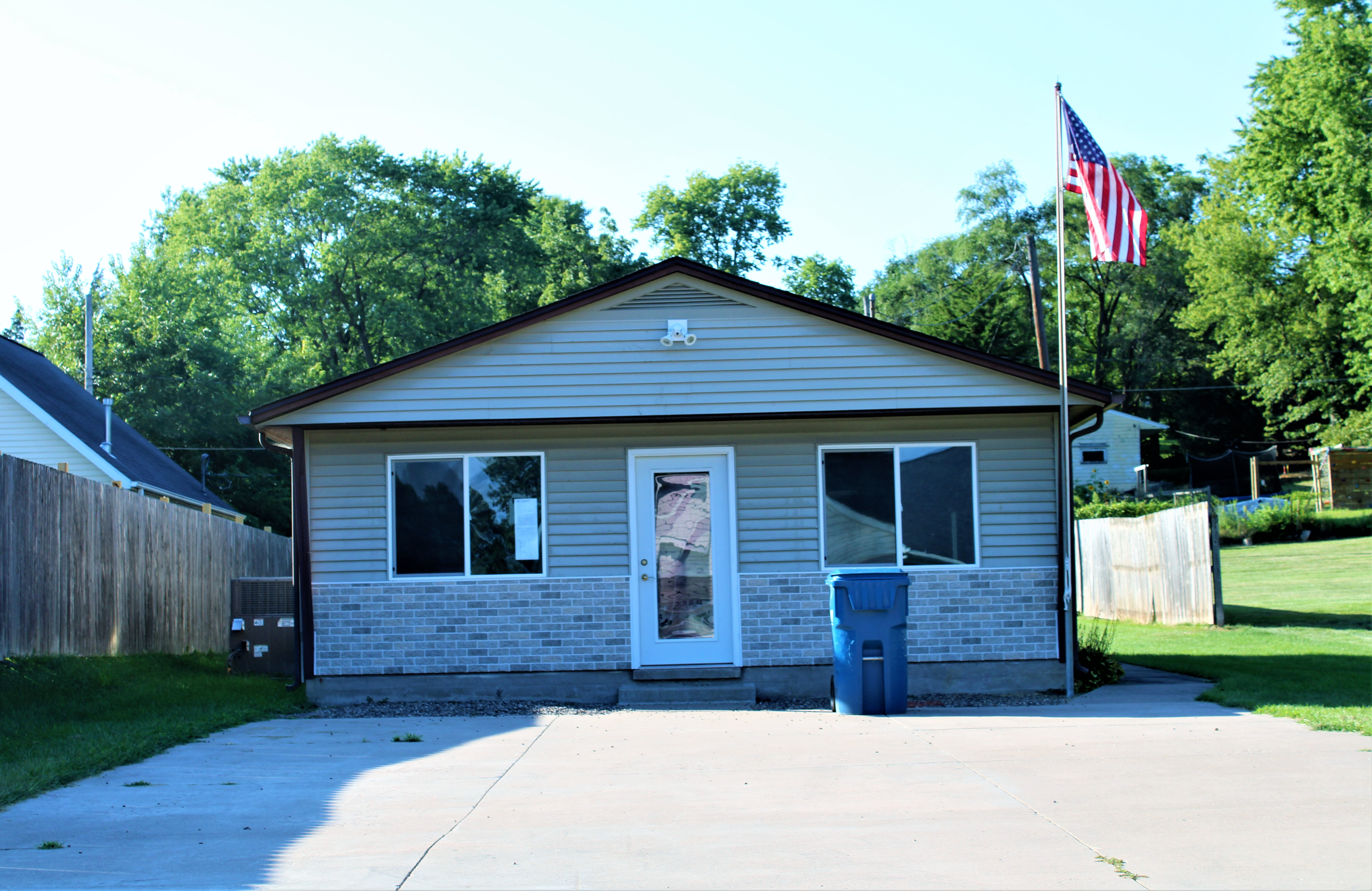
City Hall

=== 2020 census ===
As of the census of 2020, there were 139 people, 57 households, and 38 families residing in the city. The population density was 2,305.9 inhabitants per square mile (890.3/km^{2}). There were 59 housing units at an average density of 978.8 per square mile (377.9/km^{2}). The racial makeup of the city was 97.8% White, 0.7% Black or African American, 0.0% Native American, 0.0% Asian, 0.0% Pacific Islander, 0.0% from other races and 1.4% from two or more races. Hispanic or Latino persons of any race comprised 1.4% of the population.

Of the 57 households, 42.1% of which had children under the age of 18 living with them, 38.6% were married couples living together, 8.8% were cohabitating couples, 28.1% had a female householder with no spouse or partner present and 24.6% had a male householder with no spouse or partner present. 33.3% of all households were non-families. 26.3% of all households were made up of individuals, 19.3% had someone living alone who was 65 years old or older.

The median age in the city was 40.5 years. 29.5% of the residents were under the age of 20; 0.0% were between the ages of 20 and 24; 27.3% were from 25 and 44; 26.6% were from 45 and 64; and 16.5% were 65 years of age or older. The gender makeup of the city was 47.5% male and 52.5% female.

=== 2010 census ===
As of the census of 2010, there were 129 people, 52 households, and 35 families living in the city. The population density was 2,580.0 inhabitants per square mile (996.1/km^{2}). There were 54 housing units at an average density of 1,080.0 per square mile (417.0/km^{2}). The racial makeup of the city was 96.9% White, 2.3% Native American, and 0.8% Asian. Hispanic or Latino of any race were 0.8% of the population.

There were 52 households, of which 28.8% had children under the age of 18 living with them, 50.0% were married couples living together, 11.5% had a female householder with no husband present, 5.8% had a male householder with no wife present, and 32.7% were non-families. 23.1% of all households were made up of individuals, and 9.6% had someone living alone who was 65 years of age or older. The average household size was 2.48 and the average family size was 2.89.

The median age in the city was 48.6 years. 19.4% of residents were under the age of 18; 5.4% were between the ages of 18 and 24; 18.6% were from 25 to 44; 34.2% were from 45 to 64; and 22.5% were 65 years of age or older. The gender makeup of the city was 46.5% male and 53.5% female.

=== 2000 census ===
As of the census of 2000, there were 111 people, 49 households, and 29 families living in the city. The population density was 1,638.2 inhabitants per square mile (632.5/km^{2}). There were 49 housing units at an average density of 723.2 per square mile (279.2/km^{2}). The racial makeup of the city was 92.79% White and 7.21% Asian.

There were 49 households, out of which 20.4% had children under the age of 18 living with them, 51.0% were married couples living together, 8.2% had a female householder with no husband present, and 38.8% were non-families. 34.7% of all households were made up of individuals, and 14.3% had someone living alone who was 65 years of age or older. The average household size was 2.27 and the average family size was 2.93.

17.1% are under the age of 18, 8.1% from 18 to 24, 27.9% from 25 to 44, 25.2% from 45 to 64, and 21.6% who were 65 years of age or older. The median age was 42 years. For every 100 females, there were 98.2 males. For every 100 females age 18 and over, there were 84.0 males.

The median income for a household in the city was $38,125, and the median income for a family was $38,750. Males had a median income of $35,938 versus $20,938 for females. The per capita income for the city was $17,062. None of the population and none of the families were below the poverty line.

== Education ==
Residents are in the Pleasant Valley Community School District and are zoned to Pleasant View Elementary School in Bettendorf. All district residents are zoned to Pleasant Valley Middle School in LeClaire and Pleasant Valley High School in Riverdale.

== Iowa's "fastest growing city?" ==
In June 2006, a U.S. Census Bureau estimate stated that the town's population had grown to 261, a 135% increase. This figure took into account a 2002 building permits report that stated 97 permits had been issued for dwellings. Obviously, this was a mistake, for as the City Clerk noted in conversation with a news reporter, "I think we only have 54 houses in the whole town." The town is expected to appeal the estimate—the only way it will be revised—and if and when this happens, Panorama Park will have been nominally both the fastest-growing and the fastest-shrinking city in Iowa.
