= Pleasant Valley Township, Scott County, Iowa =

Pleasant Valley Township, Scott County
- Township
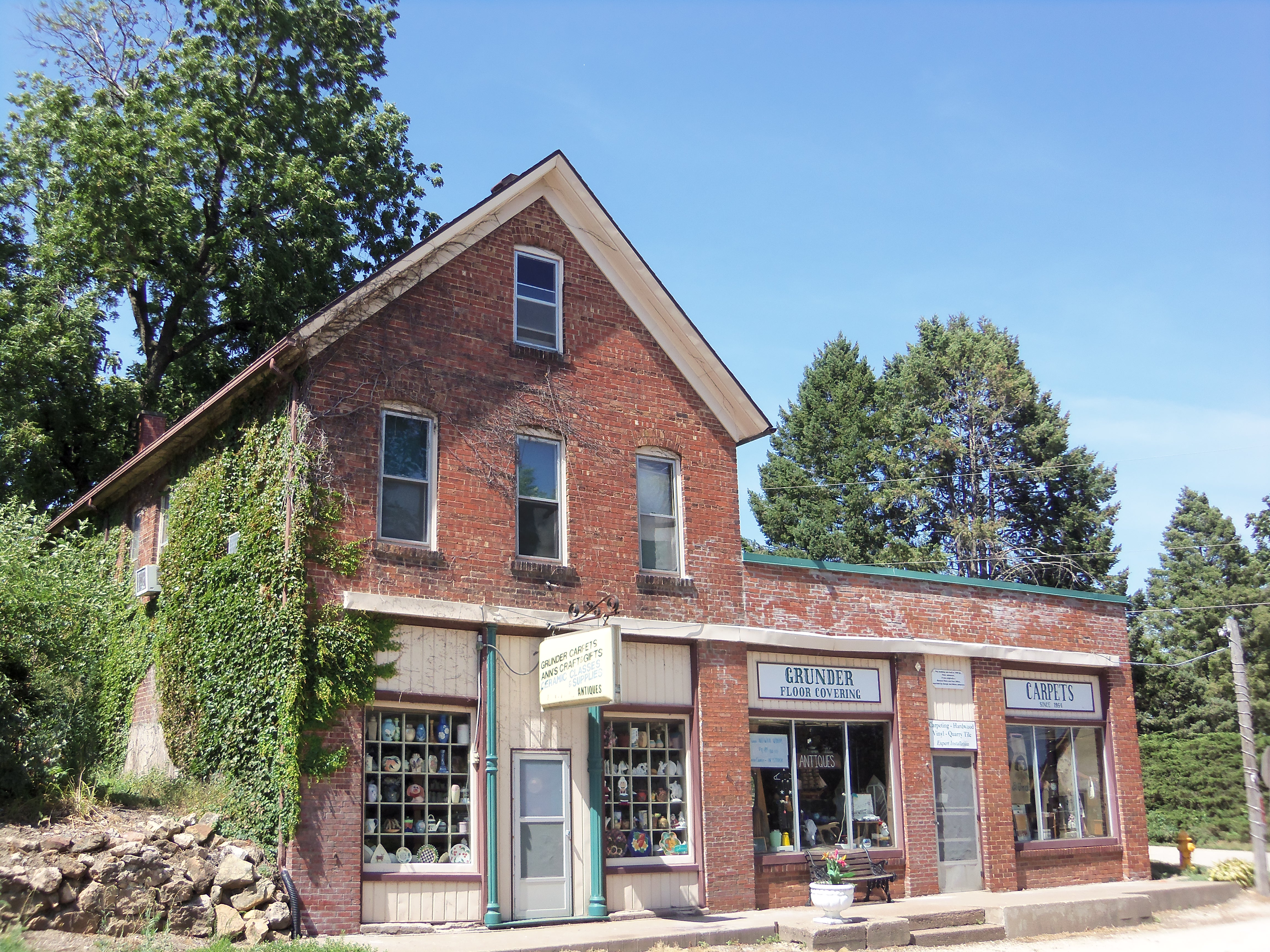

- Coordinates: 41°34′01″N 090°28′09″W
- Country: United States
- State: Iowa
- County: Scott

Area
  - Total: 28.1 sq mi (72.9 km^{2})
  - Land: 26.22 sq mi (67.92 km^{2})
  - Water: 1.92 sq mi (4.98 km^{2})
- Elevation: 630 ft (192 m)
- FIPS code: 19-93420
- GNIS feature ID: 0468548

Pleasant Valley Township is a township in Scott County, Iowa, United States.

== Geography ==
Pleasant Valley Township covers an area of 28.15 square miles (72.9 km^{2}) and is located on the shore of the Mississippi River between the cities of Bettendorf and Le Claire According to the USGS, it contains two cemeteries: Fenno and Pleasant Valley. Forest Grove School No. 5 and the Roswell Spencer House are listed on the National Register of Historic Places and located in the township.

== Education ==
Pleasant Valley Township is served by the Pleasant Valley Community School District, including Pleasant Valley High School.

== Recreation ==
Smith's Island Recreation Area, operated by the U.S. Army Corps of Engineers, offers fishing and viewing of local wildlife.
