= Riverdale, Iowa =

- City
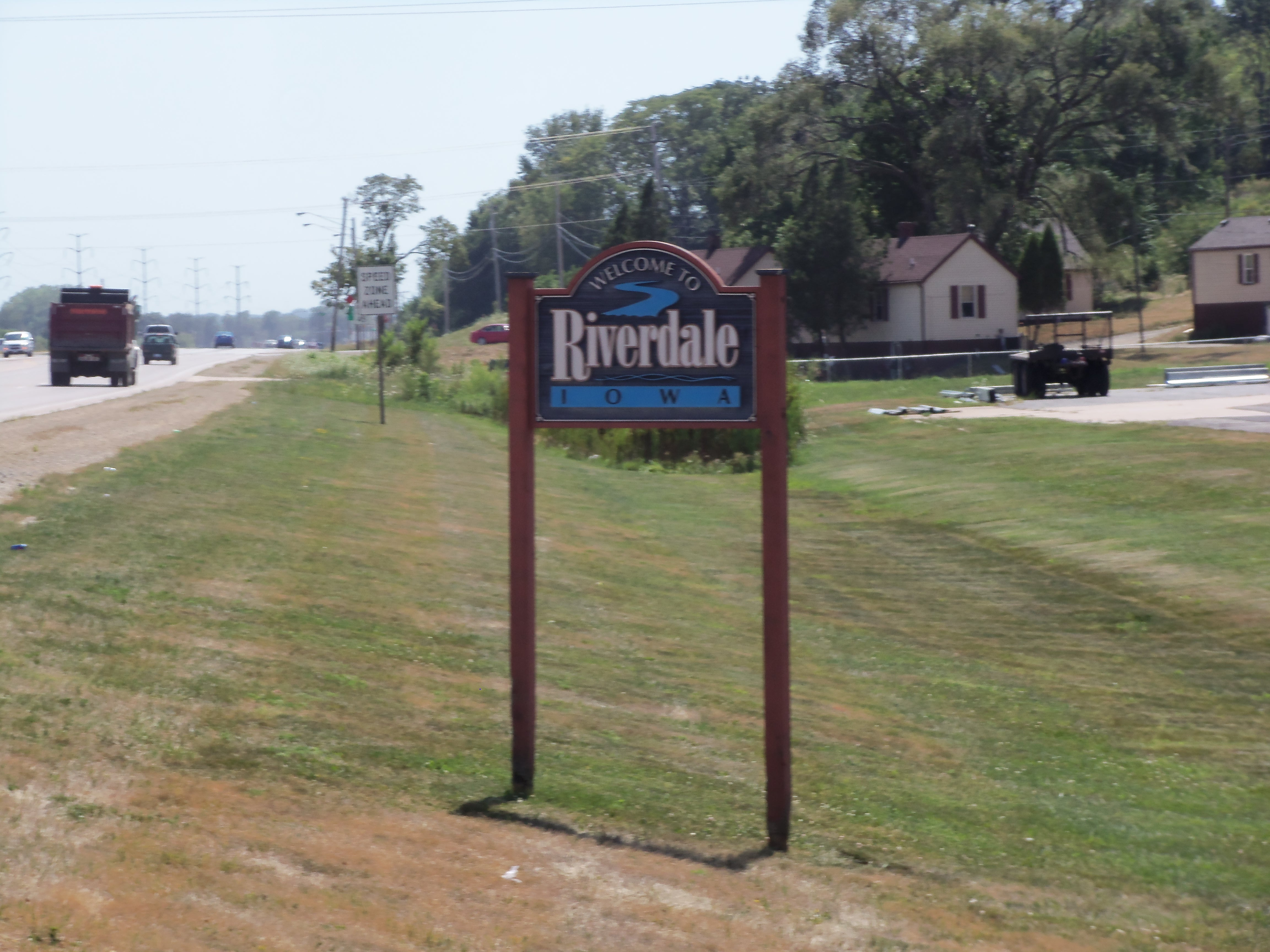
- Welcome sign along U.S. 67

- Location of Riverdale, Iowa
- Coordinates: 41°32′13″N 90°27′50″W
- Country: United States
- State: Iowa
- County: Scott
- Incorporated: December 27, 1950

Government
  - Type: Mayor-Council
  - Mayor: Anthony Heddlesten

Area
  - Total: 2.21 sq mi (5.73 km^{2})
  - Land: 1.84 sq mi (4.76 km^{2})
  - Water: 0.37 sq mi (0.96 km^{2})
- Elevation: 574 ft (175 m)

Population (2020)
  - Total: 379
  - Density: 206.1/sq mi (79.58/km^{2})
- Time zone: UTC-6 (Central (CST))
  - Summer (DST): UTC-5 (CDT)
- ZIP code: 52722
- Area code: 563
- FIPS code: 19-67350
- GNIS feature ID: 2396383
- Website: www.riverdaleia.org

Riverdale is a city in Scott County, Iowa, United States. The population was 379 at the time of the 2020 census.

The city is surrounded on three sides by the city of Bettendorf, and on the fourth by the Mississippi River. Riverdale is part of the Quad Cities metropolitan area.

Arconic has an aluminum rolling mill in Riverdale that employs approximately 2,000 people.

== History ==
In 1912, Iowana Dairy Farms was established by Col. G. W. French in what is today the city of Riverdale. French's herd of Holstein cattle became one of the largest and most outstanding in the United States. After the death of Col. French, Glenn Moore took over part of the operation as Iowana Milk Farm, and G. Decker French operated the other part of the operation as Iowana Holstein Farm. The Aluminum Company of America, (ALCOA), moved to the area in 1946. By the middle of 1948 the new plant's construction was finished and operations began in 1949.

The city of Riverdale was incorporated December 27, 1950. After a three-year incorporation challenge by the city of Bettendorf, the Iowa Supreme Court upheld the incorporation and the city of Riverdale was granted its independence on February 10, 1953.

Riverdale is part of the Quad Cities community. The area was originally called the Tri-Cities which included Moline, Rock Island, and Davenport. Later the name was changed to the Quad Cities with the addition of East Moline. Today the Quad Cities community consists of the larger cities of Davenport, Iowa; Bettendorf, Iowa; Moline, Illinois; Rock Island, Illinois; and East Moline, Illinois, as well as many surrounding smaller communities, including Eldridge, Long Grove, Park View, Argo, Blue Grass, Buffalo, Walcott, Maysville, Donahue, Big Rock, McCausland, LeClaire, Panorama Park, and Riverdale in Iowa and Silvis, Milan, Hampton, Carbon Cliff, Port Byron, Rapids City, Andalusia, Coal Valley, and Colona in Illinois. The Quad Cities has a total population of over 380,000 people.

== Geography ==
According to the United States Census Bureau, the city has a total area of 2.20 square miles (5.70 km^{2}), of which 1.84 square miles (4.77 km^{2}) is land and 0.36 square miles (0.93 km^{2}) is water.

== Neighborhoods ==
There are several distinct neighborhoods in Riverdale:

- Belmont Road - There are two clusters of homes along Belmont Road: one is directly adjacent to Pleasant Valley High School and the other is near the intersection of Belmont Road and Valley Drive (Old Hwy 67).
- Fenno Hill - This neighborhood consists of homes along Fenno Drive, Fenno Road and Valley Drive (Old Hwy 67) near the eastern edge of the community.
- Haven's Acres - This neighborhood consists of homes along Bellingham Street, Kensington Street, Wisteria Lane and Sycamore Lane. The neighborhood includes two parks, Peggy's Park (and playground) and Van Gundy Park.
- Pleasant Hills - This neighborhood consists of homes along Manor Drive, Circle Drive, Fieldcrest Road, Windsor Drive, and Elmhurst Lane. The area features Volunteer Park and Bicentennial Park and lies directly west of the Belmont Road Campus of Eastern Iowa Community College.
- Woods Estates - This neighborhood is located on the site of the historic Welch Farm, one of the original farms in the area. The land for the development was purchased in 2017. Development of the site began in 2018 and the first homes were occupied in 2020. The neighborhood is located along the western border of the community.

== Demographics ==
Historical population
Census	Pop.	Note	%±
1960	477		—
1970	684		43.4%
1980	462		−32.5%
1990	433		−6.3%
2000	656		51.5%
2010	405		−38.3%
2020	379		−6.4%
2022 (est.)	380	▲	0.3%
U.S. Decennial Census

=== 2020 census ===
As of the census of 2020, there were 379 people, 155 households, and 114 families residing in the city. The population density was 206.1 inhabitants per square mile (79.6/km^{2}). There were 168 housing units at an average density of 91.4 per square mile (35.3/km^{2}). The racial makeup of the city was 89.7% White, 2.6% Black or African American, 0.3% Native American, 1.1% Asian, 0.0% Pacific Islander, 0.0% from other races and 6.3% from two or more races. Hispanic or Latino persons of any race comprised 4.7% of the population.

Of the 155 households, 25.2% of which had children under the age of 18 living with them, 63.9% were married couples living together, 3.2% were cohabitating couples, 18.1% had a female householder with no spouse or partner present and 14.8% had a male householder with no spouse or partner present. 26.5% of all households were non-families. 23.2% of all households were made up of individuals, 10.3% had someone living alone who was 65 years old or older.

The median age in the city was 47.8 years. 21.4% of the residents were under the age of 20; 3.2% were between the ages of 20 and 24; 23.2% were from 25 and 44; 28.2% were from 45 and 64; and 24.0% were 65 years of age or older. The gender makeup of the city was 50.9% male and 49.1% female.

=== 2010 census ===
As of the census of 2010, there were 405 people, 162 households, and 128 families living in the city. The population density was 220.1 inhabitants per square mile (85.0/km^{2}). There were 186 housing units at an average density of 101.1 per square mile (39.0/km^{2}). The racial makeup of the city was 98.5% White, 0.2% African American, 0.5% Native American, and 0.7% from two or more races. Hispanic or Latino of any race were 1.5% of the population.

There were 162 households, of which 25.9% had children under the age of 18 living with them, 66.0% were married couples living together, 8.0% had a female householder with no husband present, 4.9% had a male householder with no wife present, and 21.0% were non-families. 17.3% of all households were made up of individuals, and 7.4% had someone living alone who was 65 years of age or older. The average household size was 2.50 and the average family size was 2.80.

The median age in the city was 48.4 years. 20% of residents were under the age of 18; 6% were between the ages of 18 and 24; 19.8% were from 25 to 44; 32.2% were from 45 to 64; and 22.2% were 65 years of age or older. The gender makeup of the city was 50.9% male and 49.1% female.

=== 2000 census ===
As of the census of 2000, there were 656 people, 270 households, and 193 families living in the city. The population density was 366.8 inhabitants per square mile (141.6/km^{2}). There were 285 housing units at an average density of 159.4 per square mile (61.5/km^{2}). The racial makeup of the city was 97.87% White, 0.61% African American, 0.15% Asian, 0.46% from other races, and 0.91% from two or more races. Hispanic or Latino of any race were 2.29% of the population.

There were 270 households, out of which 30.0% had children under the age of 18 living with them, 52.6% were married couples living together, 13.3% had a female householder with no husband present, and 28.5% were non-families. 24.8% of all households were made up of individuals, and 8.9% had someone living alone who was 65 years of age or older. The average household size was 2.43 and the average family size was 2.88.

26.1% are under the age of 18, 8.7% from 18 to 24, 23.8% from 25 to 44, 23.0% from 45 to 64, and 18.4% who were 65 years of age or older. The median age was 40 years. For every 100 females, there were 103.7 males. For every 100 females age 18 and over, there were 99.6 males.

The median income for a household in the city was $32,656, and the median income for a family was $41,875. Males had a median income of $37,500 versus $28,194 for females. The per capita income for the city was $19,074. About 13.9% of families and 16.7% of the population were below the poverty line, including 32.5% of those under age 18 and 5.5% of those age 65 or over.

== Education ==
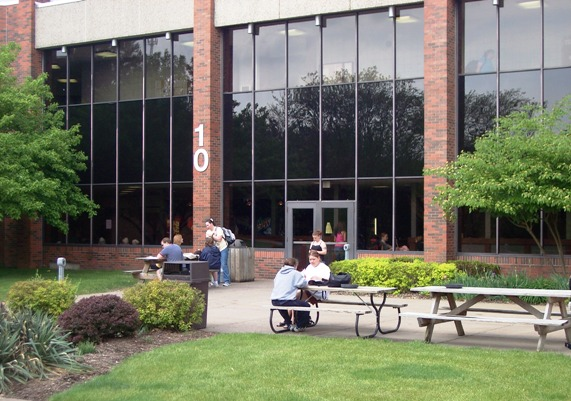
Photo of the patio area behind Scott Community College's main building.

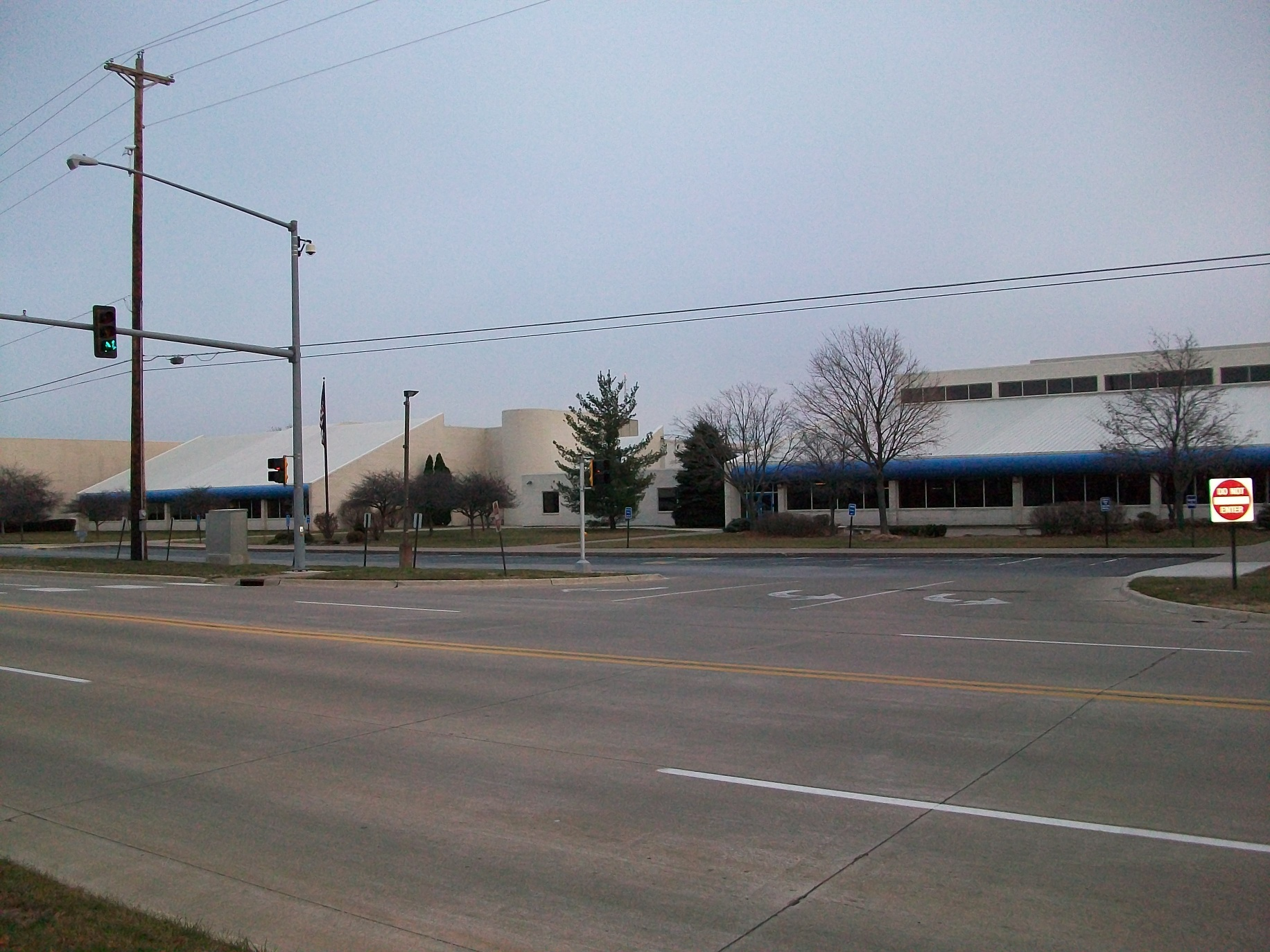
Pleasant Valley High School

Riverdale is within the Pleasant Valley Community School District.

Riverdale is zoned to Riverdale Heights Elementary School in Bettendorf. The district's sole junior high, Pleasant Valley Junior High School, is in LeClaire. Pleasant Valley High School, the district's sole high school, is in the Riverdale city limits.

Eastern Iowa Community Colleges also maintains the Belmont Road Campus of Scott Community College in Riverdale.
