= Pleasant Valley Community School District =

Public school district in Riverdale, Iowa, United States

Coordinates: 41.550259°N 90.467523°W

Location
- Riverdale, Iowa Scott County United States
- Coordinates: 41.550259, -90.467523

District information
- Type: Local school district
- Grades: K-12
- Superintendent: Brian Strusz
- Schools: 7
- Budget: $71,011,000 (2020-21)
- NCES District ID: 1923110

Students and staff
- Students: 5,803 (2022-23)
- Teachers: 350.14 FTE
- Staff: 284.99 FTE
- Student–teacher ratio: 16.57
- Athletic conference: Mississippi Athletic Conference
- District mascot: Spartans
- Colors: Navy and Gray

Other information
- Website: www.pleasval.org

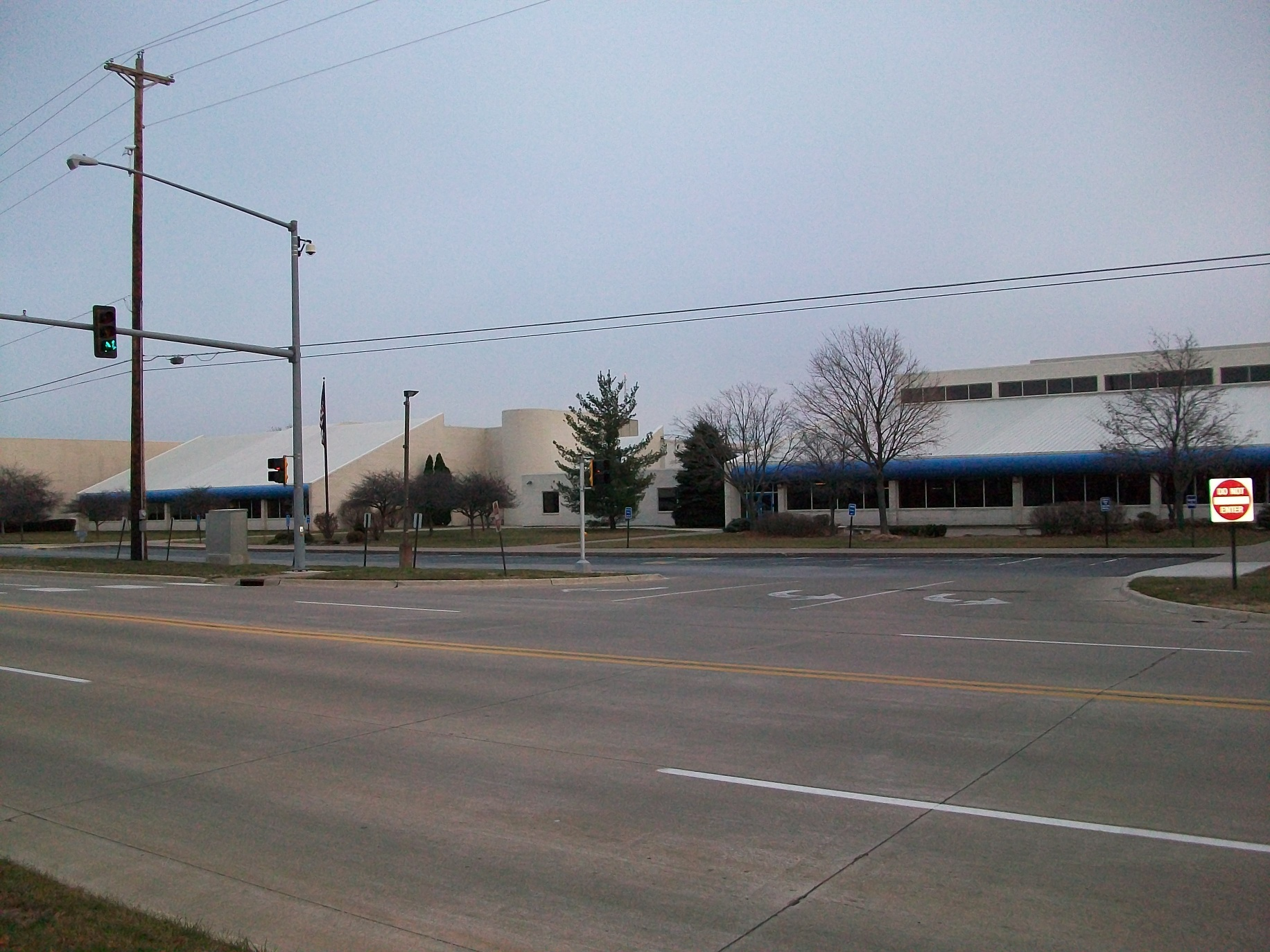
Pleasant Valley High School

The Pleasant Valley Community School District (PVCSD) is a suburban public school district headquartered in Riverdale, Iowa, near Bettendorf. The district spans areas of Scott County, including Riverdale, eastern Bettendorf, Pleasant Valley, LeClaire, and Panorama Park. It also includes the Argo census-designated place.

School board members are elected from seven director districts, five within Bettendorf's city limits and two others serving LeClaire-area residents. The board meets twice monthly at the district's administrative center.

The high school has one of the largest bands in the state of Iowa, with more than 300 members.

The school district is accredited by the North Central Association of Colleges and Schools and the Iowa Department of Education.

== Facilities ==
- Pleasant Valley High School and the administrative center are in Riverdale.
- Pleasant Valley Junior High School, located on the outskirts of LeClaire
- Bridgeview Elementary, LeClaire
- Cody Elementary, LeClaire
- Forest Grove Elementary, Bettendorf
- Hopewell Elementary, Bettendorf
- Pleasant View Elementary, Bettendorf
- Riverdale Heights Elementary, Bettendorf

== See also ==
- Lists of school districts in the United States
- List of school districts in Iowa
