= Roswell Spencer House =

Historic house in Iowa, United States

- U.S. National Register of Historic Places
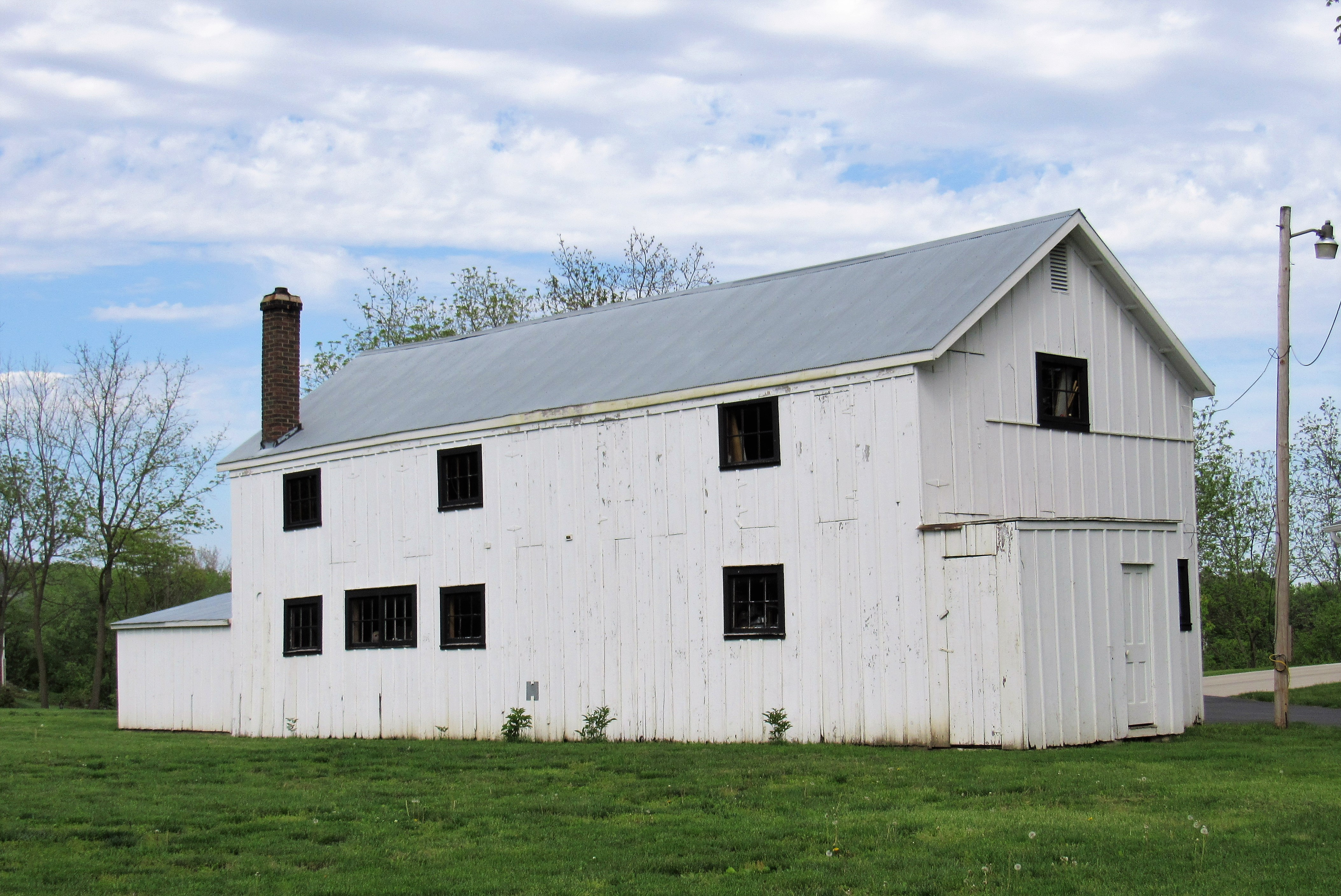
- An outbuilding that was located behind the house.

- Location within Iowa Location within the United States
- Interactive map showing the location of Roswell Spencer House
- Location: Off U.S. Route 67; Pleasant Valley, Iowa
- Coordinates: 41°34′11″N 90°25′21.6″W
- Built: 1850
- Architectural style: Greek Revival
- NRHP reference No.: 82002642
- Added to NRHP: April 22, 1982

The Roswell Spencer House is a historic property located in Pleasant Valley, Iowa, United States. The house was listed on the National Register of Historic Places in 1982.

== History ==
Roswell Spencer was a native of Vermont who headed west in 1830 when he was 29 years old. He initially settled in Greene County, Illinois before settling in Rock Island, Illinois. After he served in the Black Hawk War he relocated to the newly opened lands of eastern Iowa. He became the first white settler in what would become Pleasant Valley Township when he built a log cabin near the mouth of Spencer Creek in 1833. The following year he built another cabin above the mouth of Crow Creek. Spencer was a farmer and an industrialist. He operated saw mills with his partner Stephen Henley on both Spencer and Crow creeks. He established another sawmill on Spencer Creek with John Work in 1837. The following year he and Henley brought down the Mississippi River one of the first rafts of white pine logs from Wisconsin. Spencer entered politics and became Scott County's first treasurer.

Spencer built this house in the early 1850s and a steam-powered flouring mill across from the house in 1856. In the Financial Panic of 1857, he lost all of his property, except for his house. He served as the local postmaster and continued to live in Pleasant Valley until 1862 when he moved to Cedar County, Iowa where he was once again engaged in farming. Spencer returned to Rock Island in 1866 where he worked in the grocery business. He died there in 1876.

== Architecture ==
The Roswell Spencer House was a 2 1/2-story, Greek Revival structure that overlooked the Mississippi River. The exterior was covered in Wisconsin white pine. It was three by four bays wide with a rectangular-shaped main block. There was a single-story wing on its east side. The house had double hung windows with rectangular surrounds and pediment shaped window heads. The first floor featured one-over-one windows and the second floor featured six-over-six windows. Medium pitched gable roofs capped both the main structure and the wing. The exterior also featured pilastered corner boards, projecting boxed cornices and a plain frieze on the gable ends where double hung windows were located. The front porch had a hipped roof that was supported by Doric columns. There was also a small triangular pediment over the entranceway. There were five rooms on the first floor, four rooms on the second, and a large attic.

== See also ==
- National Register of Historic Places listings in Scott County, Iowa
