= Forest Grove School No. 5 =

- U.S. National Register of Historic Places
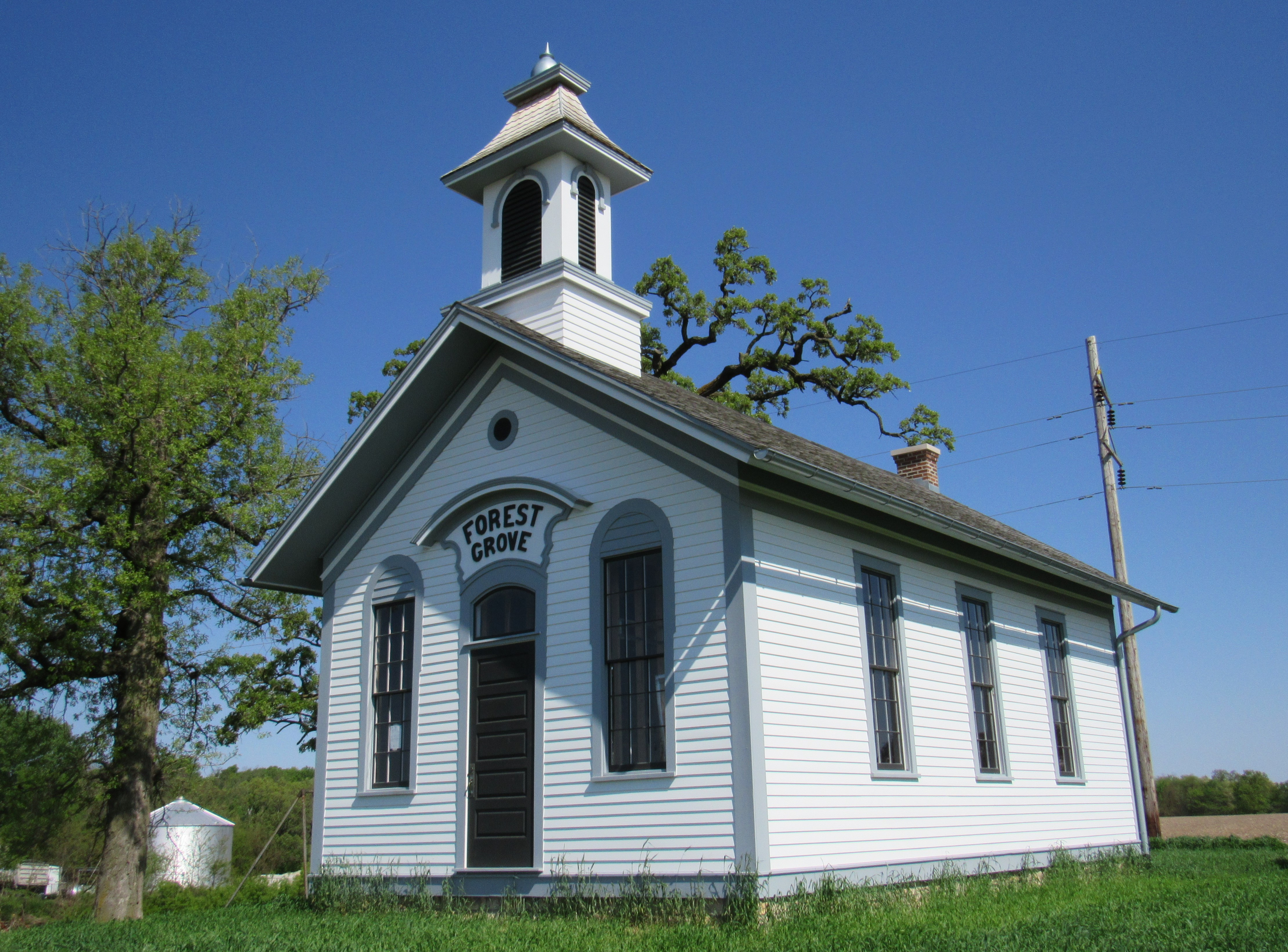
- Forest Grove School in 2017

- Location within Iowa Location within the United States
- Location: 24040 195th St. Bettendorf, Iowa
- Coordinates: 41°35′22″N 90°26′3″W
- Area: less than one acre
- Built: 1873
- Architectural style: Italianate
- NRHP reference No.: 13000831
- Added to NRHP: October 16, 2013

Forest Grove School No. 5 is a historic building located near Bettendorf, Iowa, United States. It was listed on the National Register of Historic Places in 2013.

== History ==
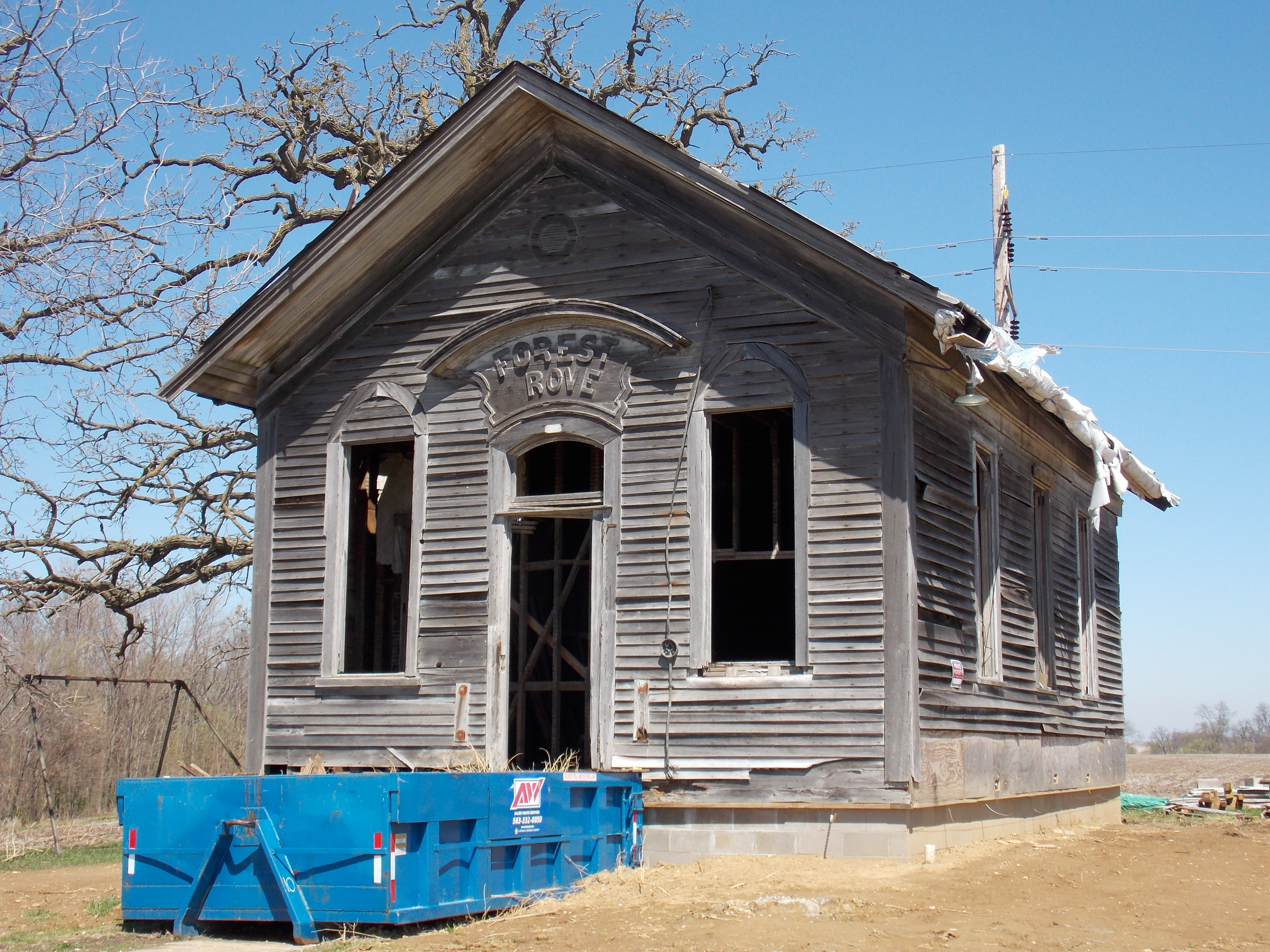
Forest Grove School No. 5 in 2014 as it was being renovated.

The one-room schoolhouse was built in 1873 after Pleasant Valley subdistrict No. 5 was formed. It was one of five subdistricts created in Pleasant Valley Township. The building was constructed and furnished for $1,500. The schoolhouse originally featured a cupola and a bell, which have subsequently been removed. It was one of five schools in Pleasant Valley Township.

The students who attended the school lived within 2 miles (3 km) in rural Scott County. Children from age 5 to about 13 or 14 were educated by a single teacher. There were generally about 30 students at a time, however, many older boys only attended school in the winter when there was less of a need for them on the farm. Children in Iowa were not legally obligated to attend school until 1902. Many of the teachers stayed for one year, but a few stayed for extended periods of time. Subjects that were taught included English, math, reading, writing, spelling, geography, and history. Books were purchased from a local merchant in Princeton. School was in session from Labor Day to Memorial Day. There were few days off during the school year and there were no days off because of snow. A program was held at Christmas time and a picnic was held on the last day of school in the spring.

The school closed in 1957 and the property was bought by Delbert and Jeannette Blunk who farmed the adjacent property. Delbert Blunk attended school here in the 1930s as did his oldest two boys. The property was acquired by Forest Grove School Preservation, who are working to restore the building to its 1920 appearance. Their plans include opening a museum for children to learn about rural education.

Of the five one-room schoolhouses in the township, this is the only one that remains in its original form. One was destroyed by fire, one was torn down, and two were converted into residences.

== Description ==
The historic designation includes five resources on a triangular lot that is less than 1 acre (0.40 ha) in size. The two contributing buildings include the 1873 schoolhouse and a small garage/fuel shed to the northeast of the school. The contributing objects include two swing sets, one on either side of the building, and a pole from the Giant Stride, a popular early 20th-century playground feature. The swing set on the west side of the schoolhouse is located between two burr oak trees, which are all that remains from a grove of about 15 trees from which the school received its name. The remnants of the school's well are located in front of the building and that of an outhouse to the northwest of the schoolhouse.

== Restoration ==
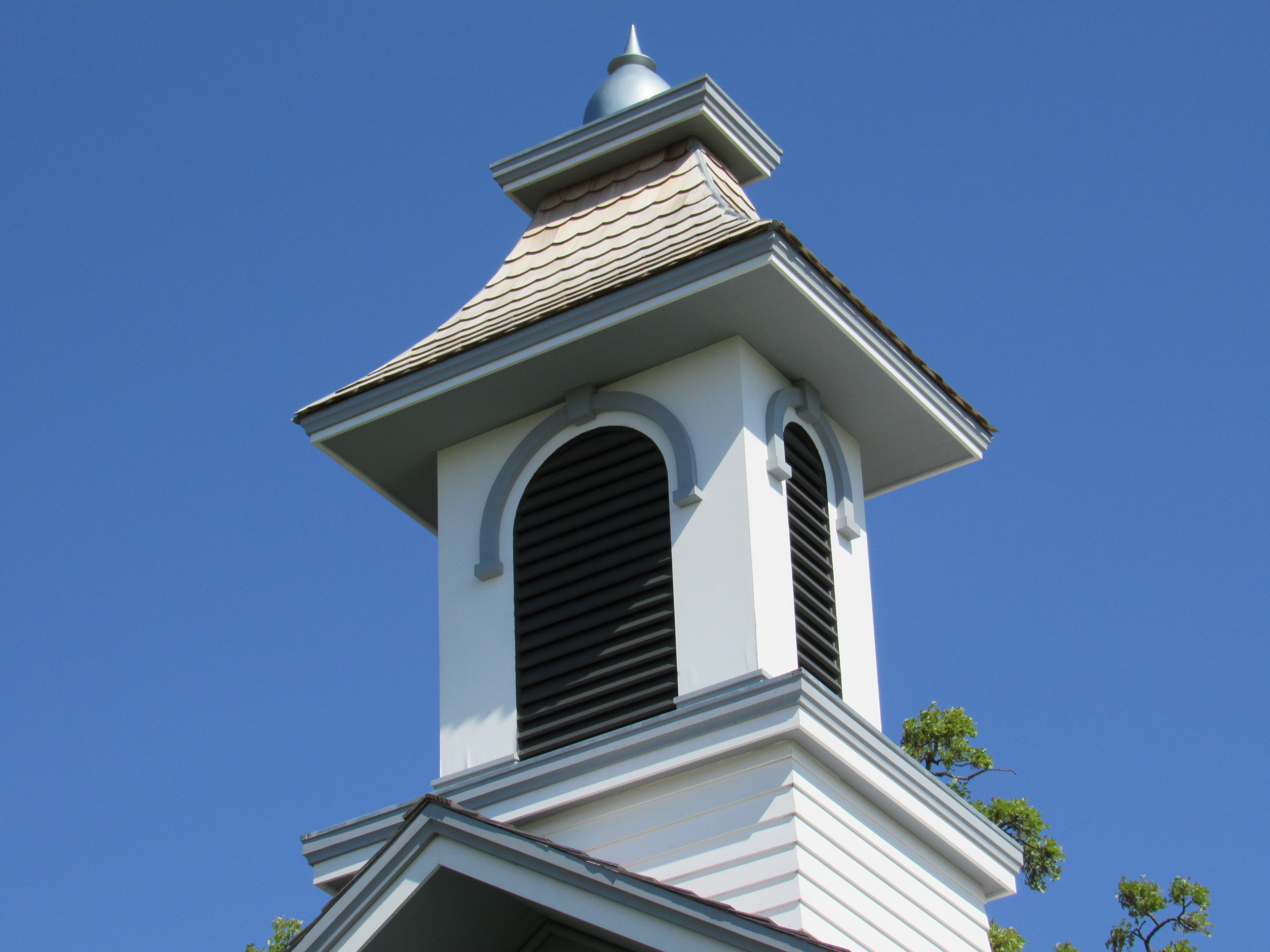
The new cupola

Renovation of the building began in 2012. Cedar Rapids architect Doug Steinmetz drew up the plans for the project. In 2014 a new furnace and a cedar shake roof were installed. By the end of 2015 a new concrete block foundation was constructed, wood siding was either replaced or maintained and painted. Eight replica replacement windows were put in place, and a new front door created by Carver Custom Millworks of Milan, Illinois, was installed. A new chimney, while not functional, was built on the north side with salvaged bricks to enhance the building's 1920s appearance. On September 6, 2016, a replica bell tower, made by LeClaire, Iowa carpenter Ben Taylor, was put in place. The tower contains the school's original bell.

The restoration project was featured in the National Trust for Historic Preservation's magazine, Preservation, in 2018.

The project was also the subject of the 2023 Mid-America Emmy Awards winning Documentary Resurrecting Forest Grove.
