= Elizabeth Hamilton Guarino =

American author

Elizabeth Hamilton-Guarino
- Education: Pleasant Valley High School, St. Ambrose University
- Occupation: Author
- Writing career
- Genres: Poetry, Memoir, Criticism
- Notable work: Percolate – Let Your Best Self Filter Through

Elizabeth Hamilton-Guarino (born September 24, 1969) is an American author and model who has written eight books including Percolate – Let Your Best Self Filter Through and The Change Guidebook – How to Align Your Heart, Truths, and Energy to Find Success in All Areas of Your Life. She is the founder of The Best Ever You Show.

She was Mrs. Maine in 2006, Miss Iowa National Teen-Ager in 1988, and Mrs. Maine International 2011. She is a leadership advisor for the Olympia Snowe Women's Leadership Institute and serves as a member of the Forbes Business Council.

== Early life and education ==
Guarino was born in Bloomington, Minnesota, and raised in Bettendorf, Iowa. She completed her high school education at Pleasant Valley High School in Iowa. In 1991, she graduated from St. Ambrose University in Davenport, Iowa with a degree in communications and broadcasting.

== Career ==
Guarino has worked in regulatory positions for Merrill Corporation, Integreon, American Financial Printing, and Dow Investment Group. She was also a news reporter for WGME-TV in Portland, Maine.

In 1988 Guarino was crowned Miss Iowa National Teen-Ager. In 2006, Guarino won the Mrs. Maine title. In 2011, she won the title of Mrs. Maine International.

In 2022 she published her book The Change Guidebook.

She published her first self-help book titled Percolate: Let Your Best Self Filter Through, the inspiration for the book came from her father's stroke rehabilitation.

== Publications ==
- Percolate – Let Your Best Self Filter Through (2014)
- The Change Guidebook (2022)
- A Lesson for Every Child (2020)
- Self-Confident Sandy (2020)
- Best Ever You (2020)
- Blueberry – A Cat's Eye View of Maine
- Pinky Doodle Bug (2011)
- Pinky Doodle Dance (co-author with Wimbledon Finalist, Sally Moore Huss) (2021)
- The Success Guidebook (2024)
