= Argo, Iowa =

- Census-designated place
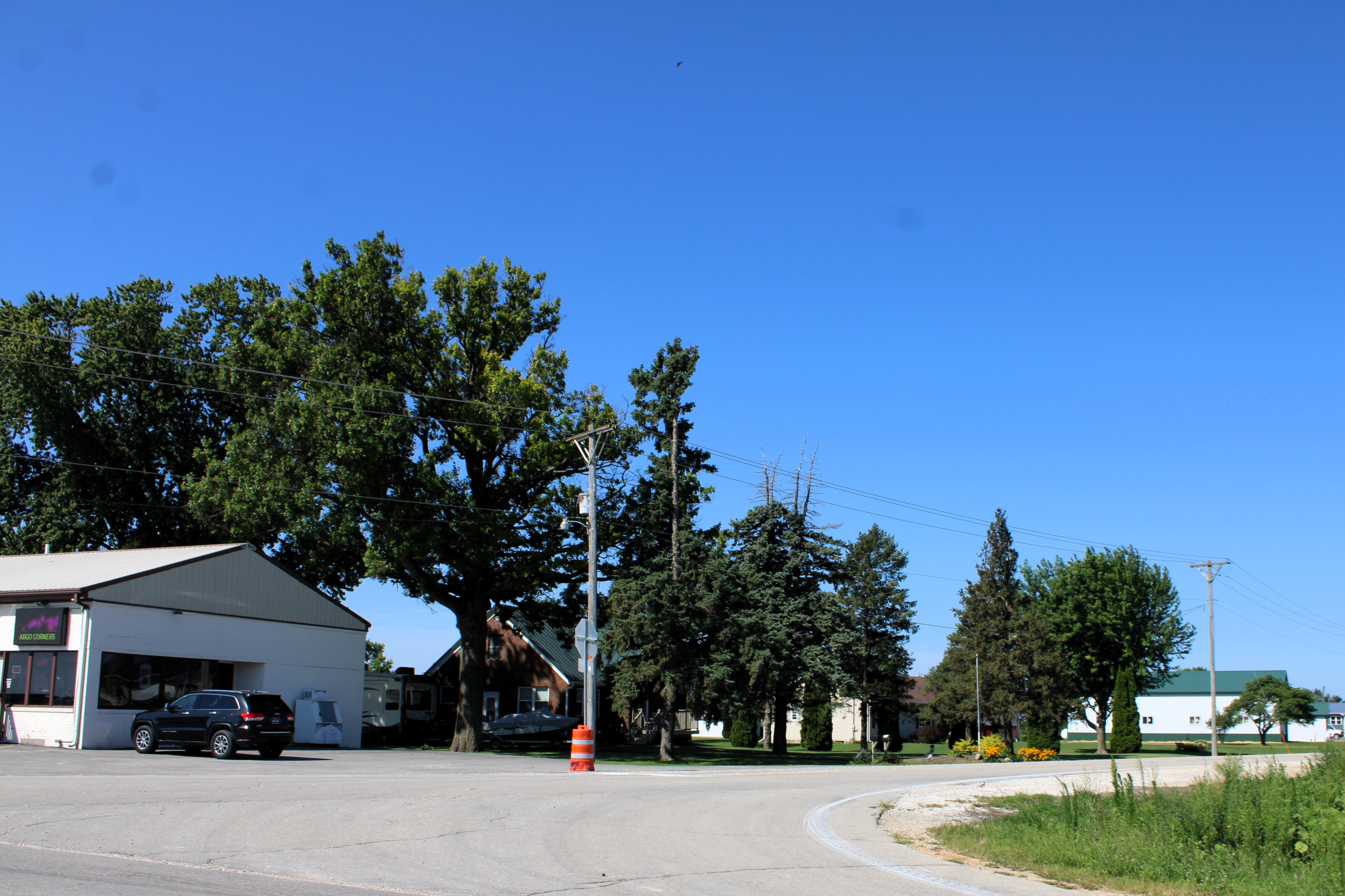
- Argo, Iowa in 2023

- Location within Iowa Location within the United States
- Coordinates: 41°37′28″N 90°26′01″W
- Country: United States
- State: Iowa
- County: Scott
- Township: Le Claire

Area
  - Total: 0.46 sq mi (1.18 km^{2})
  - Land: 0.46 sq mi (1.18 km^{2})
  - Water: 0 sq mi (0.00 km^{2})
- Elevation: 764 ft (233 m)

Population (2020)
  - Total: 44
  - Density: 96.4/sq mi (37.23/km^{2})
- Time zone: UTC-6 (Central (CST))
  - Summer (DST): UTC-5 (CDT)
- ZIP Codes: 52753 (Le Claire); 52807 (Davenport)
- Area code: 563
- FIPS code: 19-02665
- GNIS feature ID: 2806449

Argo is an unincorporated community and census-designated place (CDP) in Scott County, Iowa, United States. It is in the eastern part of the county, 9 miles (14 km) northeast of Bettendorf and 5 miles (8 km) northwest of Le Claire. As of the 2020 census, Argo had a population of 44.

Argo was first listed as a CDP prior to the 2020 census.

== Demographics ==
Historical population
Census	Pop.	Note	%±
2020	44		—
U.S. Decennial Census

=== 2020 census ===
As of the census of 2020, there were 44 people, 14 households, and 8 families residing in the community. The population density was 96.4 inhabitants per square mile (37.2/km^{2}). There were 19 housing units at an average density of 41.6 per square mile (16.1/km^{2}). The racial makeup of the community was 93.2% White, 0.0% Black or African American, 0.0% Native American, 2.3% Asian, 0.0% Pacific Islander, 0.0% from other races and 4.5% from two or more races. Hispanic or Latino persons of any race comprised 0.0% of the population.

Of the 14 households, 35.7% of which had children under the age of 18 living with them, 57.1% were married couples living together, 7.1% were cohabitating couples, 7.1% had a female householder with no spouse or partner present and 28.6% had a male householder with no spouse or partner present. 42.9% of all households were non-families. 35.7% of all households were made up of individuals, 7.1% had someone living alone who was 65 years old or older.

The median age in the community was 44.3 years. 27.3% of the residents were under the age of 20; 0.0% were between the ages of 20 and 24; 29.5% were from 25 and 44; 20.5% were from 45 and 64; and 22.7% were 65 years of age or older. The gender makeup of the community was 31.8% male and 68.2% female.

== History ==
Argo was originally known as Porter's Corners, but by the turn of the century, the name Argo had supplanted the original name. Argo's population was 71 in 1902, and 35 in 1925. The population was 10 in 1940.

== Education ==
It is in the Pleasant Valley Community School District.

== See also ==
- Plainview, Iowa
