= Pleasant Valley High School (Iowa) =

Public secondary school in Bettendorf, Iowa, United States

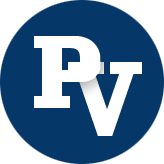

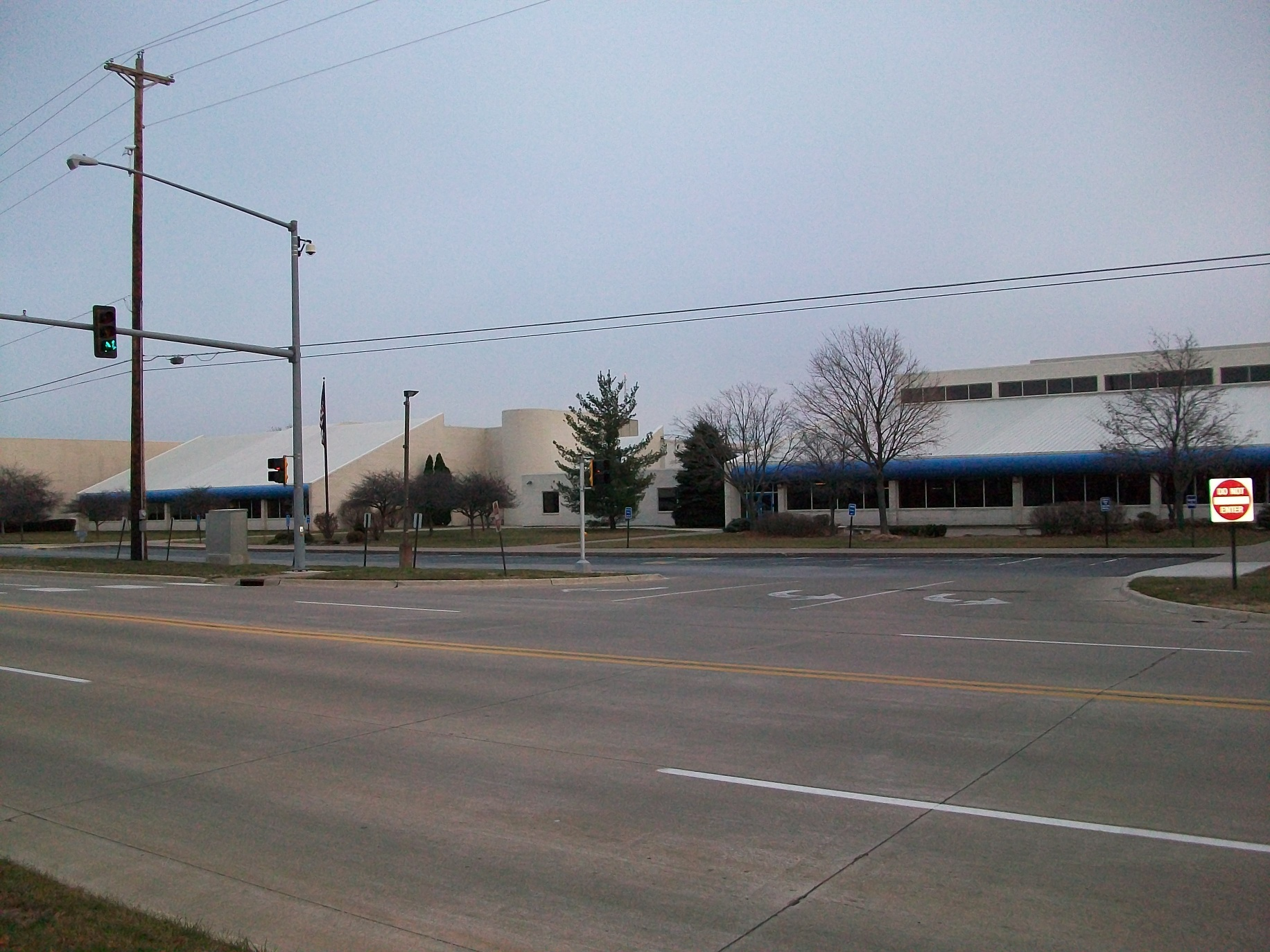

Location
- 604 Belmont Road; Bettendorf, Iowa 52722; United States; 41°33′11″N 90°28′14″W

Information
- Type: Public secondary
- Motto: Committed to Excellence
- Established: 1961
- School district: Pleasant Valley
- Superintendent: Brian Strusz
- Principal: Darren Erickson
- Teaching staff: 96.70 (on an FTE basis)
- Grades: 9-12
- Enrollment: 1,679 (2023-2024)
- Student to teacher ratio: 17.36
- Colors: Navy Blue and Gray
- Athletics: Mississippi Athletic Conference
- Mascot: Spartan
- Newspaper: The Spartan Shield
- Yearbook: Valenian
- Website: Pleasant Valley HS website

Pleasant Valley High School is a public four-year comprehensive high school located in Bettendorf, Iowa, on the border with Riverdale, Iowa. The school is part of the Pleasant Valley Community School District, and it has an enrollment of approximately 1,541 students in grades 9 through 12.

Located approximately one mile west of U.S. Highway 67 and 3 miles south of U.S. Interstate 80, Pleasant Valley High School draws students from several communities in eastern Iowa Scott County, Iowa, including eastern Bettendorf, Riverdale, LeClaire and surrounding rural areas—including Pleasant Valley Township (for which the school district was named). Bettendorf High School is their cross-town rival, located five minutes to the west.

== History ==
The Pleasant Valley Township School District had formed in 1957, and two elementary schools in the tiny school district—Riverview and Pleasant View—were deemed too small to house a high school program. Construction on a $1.36 million junior-senior high school building, on a 40-acre site along Belmont Road at Bettendorf's northeast city limits, began in 1959, and the first day of class was September 12, 1960. The first graduating class was in 1962, with 24 seniors (there was no 1961 graduating class). Richard Klahn was the first principal, and oversaw a teaching staff that was quickly regarded as one of the finest in Iowa. (The first teaching staff had to have master's degrees or were currently working on one.)

"The original Pleasant Valley High School boasted many modern features," a history of the school, published in the 1986 Valenian (the high school yearbook), said of the then state-of-the-art features. "All rooms and corridors were acoustically engineered. Each room had thermostatically controlled heat with an automatically controlled fresh-filtered air supply. Colors (blue, green, gold, olive and chartreuse) were scientifically selected for balanced brightness ration and light reflectance. A two-way public address system in every room provided for paging, announcements, radio and recorded programs. A master time-keeping system automatically corrected all clocks throughout the building. Swanson and Maiwald (the Moline, Illinois-based architectural firm that designed the school) even made provisions in the gym for future additions of permanent and folding bleachers and for an electronically operated folding partiction to divide the gym area into two practice courts. Also included was a roof-top telescope over the library."

In 1966, the Pleasant Valley School district merged with the LeClaire and Cody school districts, meaning high school students from those districts (they had previously gone to Bettendorf) were now attending Pleasant Valley. Junior-senior high school enrollment increased to over 600 (it had been less than half that previously), and a three-phase building program was started, with additions completed in 1967, 1971 and 1974. Junior high students were moved from the high school building to the new Blackhawk Junior High in LeClaire (now Pleasant Valley Junior High) in 1970. During the mid-1970s, a proposal to renovate and move high school students to Blackhawk Junior High and repurpose the high school building as a junior high, failed. In 1984, the high school, along with the district's other four schools, were honored with the "Excellence in Education" award, in recognition of the district's high academic standards and fine teaching staff.

In the 2025-2026 school year, the principal of two years, Mike Hawley, introduced some controversial policies to the school. Hawley hired six untrained, unqualified guards to patrol the hallways causing tension and fear among students. Many teachers disapprove of these policies complaining about the prison-like nature of the guards. After the completion of the lunchroom expansion in late second quarter, Hawley shortened one lunch period by 20% and extended the previous one. These issues combined with the Iowa ban on cellphones in school has caused significant unrest among the student populous.

== Athletics ==
The Pleasant Valley Spartans participate in the Mississippi Athletic Conference including the following sports: Baseball; boys' and girls' basketball; boys' and girls' bowling; cheerleading; boys' and girls' cross country; football; boys' and girls' golf; platinum dance; softball; boys' and girls' soccer; boys' and girls' swimming; boys' and girls' tennis; boys' and girls' track; and wrestling.

=== Successes ===
- Boys' Cross Country - (4-time Class 4A State Champions - 2006, 2007, 2008, 2017)
- Girls' Cross Country - (4-time State Champions - 1983, 1985, 1994, 2012)
- Football - 1985 Class 3A State Champions
- Boys' Track and Field - 2008 Class 4A State Champions
- Girls' Track and Field - 3-time State Champions (1985 (3A), 1991 (3A), 2024 (4A))
- Wrestling - (2-time Class 3A State Duals Champions - 1995, 1997)
- Boys' Soccer - (2-time Class 3A State Champions - 2021, 2022)
- Boys' Baseball - 2021 Class 4A State Champions
- Girls' Volleyball - (2-time Class 5A State Champions 2021, 2024)
- Girls' Basketball - 2023 Class 5A State Champion

== Alumni ==
The school's notable alumni include:

- Chris Anthony — former Arena Football League wide receiver/linebacker for the New York Dragons
- Louie Conn — NFL Cheerleader for the Minnesota Vikings
- Christine Romans — CNN reporter and anchor
- Elizabeth Hamilton Guarino — author of The Change Guidebook
- Samantha Pauly — Broadway actress and singer

== See also ==
- List of high schools in Iowa
