= Cram (surname) =

Cram is a surname, and may refer to

- Alastair Cram (1909–1994), Scottish mountaineer, lawyer and Second World War British Army officer
- Allan Gilbert Cram (1886–1947), American painter
- Bobby Cram (1939–2007), English footballer
- Cleveland Cram (1917–1999), American CIA station chief and historian
- Donald J. Cram (1919–2001), Nobel Prize–winning American chemist
- Edith Claire Cram (1880–1960), American peace activist and heiress
- Eloise Blaine Cram (1896–1957), American parasitologist
- George F. Cram (1842–1928), American map publisher
- George Henry Cram (1838–1872), Union Army colonel during the American Civil War
- Holly Cram (born 1984), Scottish field hockey player
- Jerry Cram (born 1947), American former baseball pitcher and coach
- Mildred Cram (1889–1985), American writer
- Ralph Adams Cram (1863–1942), American architect
- Ralph W. Cram (1869–1952), American newspaper publisher and aviator
- Scott Cram (born 1977), Australian-born former Scotland international rugby league footballer
- Steve Cram (born 1960), British former middle-distance runner
- Thomas J. Cram (1804–1883), American topographical engineer
