= Colonel Sanders (disambiguation) =

Colonel Sanders (1890–1980) was an American businessman and the founder of KFC.

Colonel Sanders may also refer to:

- Addison Hiatt Sanders (1823–1912), a colonel in the Union Army during the American Civil War
- John C. C. Sanders (1840–1864), a colonel (and brigadier general) in the Confederate States Army during the American Civil War
- William P. Sanders (1833–1863), a colonel in the Union Army during the American Civil War.

== See also ==
- Colonel Sandurz, a character in Spaceballs
