= Ralph Cram =

Ralph Cram may refer to:

- Ralph Adams Cram (1863–1942), American architect
- Ralph W. Cram (1869–1952), American journalist and newspaper editor
