= 9th Kentucky Infantry Regiment (Union) =

- Active: November 20, 1861 - December 15, 1864
- Country: United States
- Allegiance: Union
- Branch: Infantry
- Engagements: Battle of Shiloh; Siege of Corinth; Battle of Perryville; Battle of Stones River; Tullahoma Campaign; Battle of Chickamauga; Chattanooga campaign Battle of Missionary Ridge; Atlanta campaign Battle of Resaca; Battle of Kennesaw Mountain; Battle of Peachtree Creek; Siege of Atlanta; Battle of Jonesboro; Battle of Lovejoy's Station

The 9th Kentucky Infantry Regiment was an infantry regiment that served in the Union Army during the American Civil War.

== Service ==
The 9th Kentucky Infantry Regiment was organized at Camp Boyle, Adair County, Kentucky and mustered in for a three-year enlistment on November 20, 1861.

The regiment was attached to Thomas' Command, Army of the Ohio, November 1861. 11th Brigade, Army of the Ohio, to December 1861. 11th Brigade, 1st Division, Army of the Ohio, to March 1862, 11th Brigade, 5th Division, Army of the Ohio, to September 1862. 11th Brigade, 5th Division, II Corps, Army of the Ohio, to November 1862. 1st Brigade, 3rd Division, Left Wing, XIV Corps, Army of the Cumberland, to January 1863. 1st Brigade, 3rd Division, XXI Corps, Army of the Cumberland, to October 1863. 3rd Brigade, 3rd Division, IV Corps, to December 1864.

The 9th Kentucky Infantry mustered out of service on December 15, 1864.

== Detailed service ==
Duty at Columbia, Kentucky, until February 1862. March to Bowling Green, Kentucky, then to Nashville, Tennessee, February 15-March 8. March to Savannah, Tennessee, March 18-April 6. Battle of Shiloh, April 7. Advance on and siege of Corinth, Mississippi, April 29-May 30. Engaged May 21, 28, and 29. Occupation of Corinth May 30, and pursuit to Booneville May 31-June 1. March to Stevenson, Alabama, via Iuka, Mississippi, Tuscumbia, Florence, Huntsville, and Athens, Alabama, June 12-July 24; then to Battle Creek, Tennessee, and duty there until August 20. March to Louisville, Kentucky, in pursuit of Bragg August 20-September 26. Pursuit of Bragg to London, Kentucky, October 1–22. Battle of Perryville, October 8 (reserve). Nelson's Cross Roads October 18. March to Nashville, Tennessee, October 22-November 7 and duty there until December 26. Advance on Murfreesboro December 26–30. Battle of Stones River December 30–31, 1862 and January 1–3, 1863. At Murfreesboro until June. Tullahoma Campaign June 23-July 7. At McMinnville until August 16. Passage of Cumberland Mountains and Tennessee River and Chickamauga Campaign August 16-September 22. Battle of Chickamauga September 19–20. Siege of Chattanooga September 24-November 23. Chattanooga-Ringgold Campaign November 23–27. Orchard Knob November 23–24. Missionary Ridge November 25. Pursuit to Graysville November 26–27. March to relief of Knoxville November 28-December 8. Operations in eastern Tennessee December 1863 to April 1864. Atlanta Campaign May 1 to September 8. Demonstrations on Rocky Faced Ridge and Dalton, Georgia, May 8–13. Battle of Resaca May 14–15. Adairsville May 17. Near Kingston May 18–19. Near Cassville May 19. Advance on Dallas May 22–25. Operations on line of Pumpkin Vine Creek and battles about Dallas, New Hope Church, and Allatoona Hills May 25-June 5. Pickett's Mills May 27. Operations about Marietta and against Kennesaw Mountain June 10-July 2. Pine Hill June 11–14. Lost Mountain June 15–17. Assault on Kennesaw June 27, Ruff's Station, Smyrna Camp Ground, July 4. Chattahoochie River July 6–17. Peachtree Creek July 19–20. Siege of Atlanta July 22-August 25. Flank movement on Jonesboro August 25–30. Battle of Jonesboro August 31-September 1. Lovejoy's Station September 2–6. Operations against Hood in northern Georgia and northern Alabama October 1–26. Moved to Nashville, then to Pulaski, Tennessee. Ordered to Kentucky November 22.

== Casualties ==
The regiment lost a total of 357 men during service; 8 officers and 96 enlisted men killed or mortally wounded, 3 officers and 250 enlisted men died of disease.

== Commanders ==
- Colonel Benjamin C. Grider
- Lieutenant Colonel George Henry Cram

== See also ==
- List of Kentucky Civil War Units
- Kentucky in the Civil War
