= Quad-City Times =

Newspaper in Davenport, Iowa

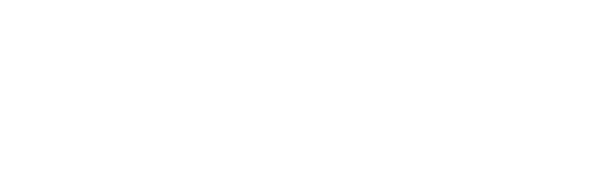

- The July 27, 2005 front page of the Quad-City Times
- Type: Daily newspaper
- Format: Broadsheet
- Owner: Lee Enterprises
- Publisher: Deb Anselm
- Editor: Tom Martin
- Founded: 1855
- Language: English
- Headquarters: 500 E. Third St. Davenport, Iowa 52801; U.S.
- Circulation: 22,116 Daily; 23,685 Sunday (as of 2023)
- Website: qctimes.com

The Quad-City Times is a daily morning newspaper based in Davenport, Iowa, and circulated throughout the Quad Cities metropolitan area, including Davenport, Bettendorf and Scott County in Iowa; and Moline, East Moline, Rock Island, and Rock Island County in Illinois.

As a regional newspaper, the Quad-City Times is also circulated and has readership in Cedar, Clinton, Jackson, Louisa and Muscatine counties in Iowa; and Carroll, Henry, Mercer and Whiteside counties in Illinois.

According to the Iowa Newspaper Association, the Quad-City Times has a circulation of 61,366 as of 2006. The newspaper is owned by Lee Enterprises, which is also located in Davenport.

== History ==
=== 19th century ===
The Quad-City Times grew from several predecessors, including the Democratic Banner and Blue Ribbon News.

The Democratic Banner was founded in 1848, was sold in 1855 to a group of business owners, and rechristened the Iowa State Democrat. The Iowa State Democrat published its first edition on October 15 of that year, with E. T. Eagel as its first publisher. The newspaper underwent many changes throughout its early history, and by 1899, its circulation was 1,300 daily and 2,500 weekly. By 1903, it was known as the Davenport Democrat.

=== 20th century ===
In 1905, after purchasing its rival newspaper, The Davenport Leader, the name became The Davenport Democrat & Leader, under the city editorship of Ralph W. Cram.

The newspaper was sold to Lee Enterprises in 1915; thereafter, Cram became editor and publisher until 1940. Davenport was dropped from masthead in 1937, and by 1951 the newspaper adopted the name of Morning Democrat.

The Blue Ribbon News began publication in 1878; by 1886, it was known as the Davenport Daily Times. The newspaper, which struggled for many years, was sold in 1899 to A. W. Lee (founder of Lee Enterprises) for $120,000.

Both newspapers continued to grow in circulation before being combined into one newspaper — Times-Democrat — in 1964. By 1974, with circulation expanding throughout eastern Iowa and western Illinois, the newspaper was given its current name.

In December 1989, the Quad-City Times moved into its current building at 500 E. Third St., in Davenport, Iowa. The facility, completed for $23.8 million, includes a five-story press room, mail room, warehouse, and editorial offices. The facility also houses Trico, the newspaper's commercial printing business.

The Quad-City Times has been on the leading edge of technology, becoming the first all-electronic newspaper in 1973. Electronic pagination began in 1988, with all-digital photography taking root by 1994.

=== Brent Bozell scandal ===
In 2014, it was revealed that L. Brent Bozell III, whose conservative column the Quad-City Times had been publishing, was not written by Bozell at all but by designated ghostwriters.

Following the revelation, the Quad-City Times dropped Bozell's column, reporting that, "Bozell may have been comfortable representing others' work as his own. We're not. The latest disclosure convinces us Bozell has no place on our print or web pages."

Current Quad-City Times columnists include Roy Booker, Linda Cook, Matt Coss, Jennifer DeWitt, Don Doxsie, Alma Gaul, and Barb Ickes. The current editor is Matt Christensen, and Deb Anselm is the publisher.

In November 2025, The Quad-City Times moved to a six day printing schedule, eliminating its printed Monday edition.

== Other editions ==
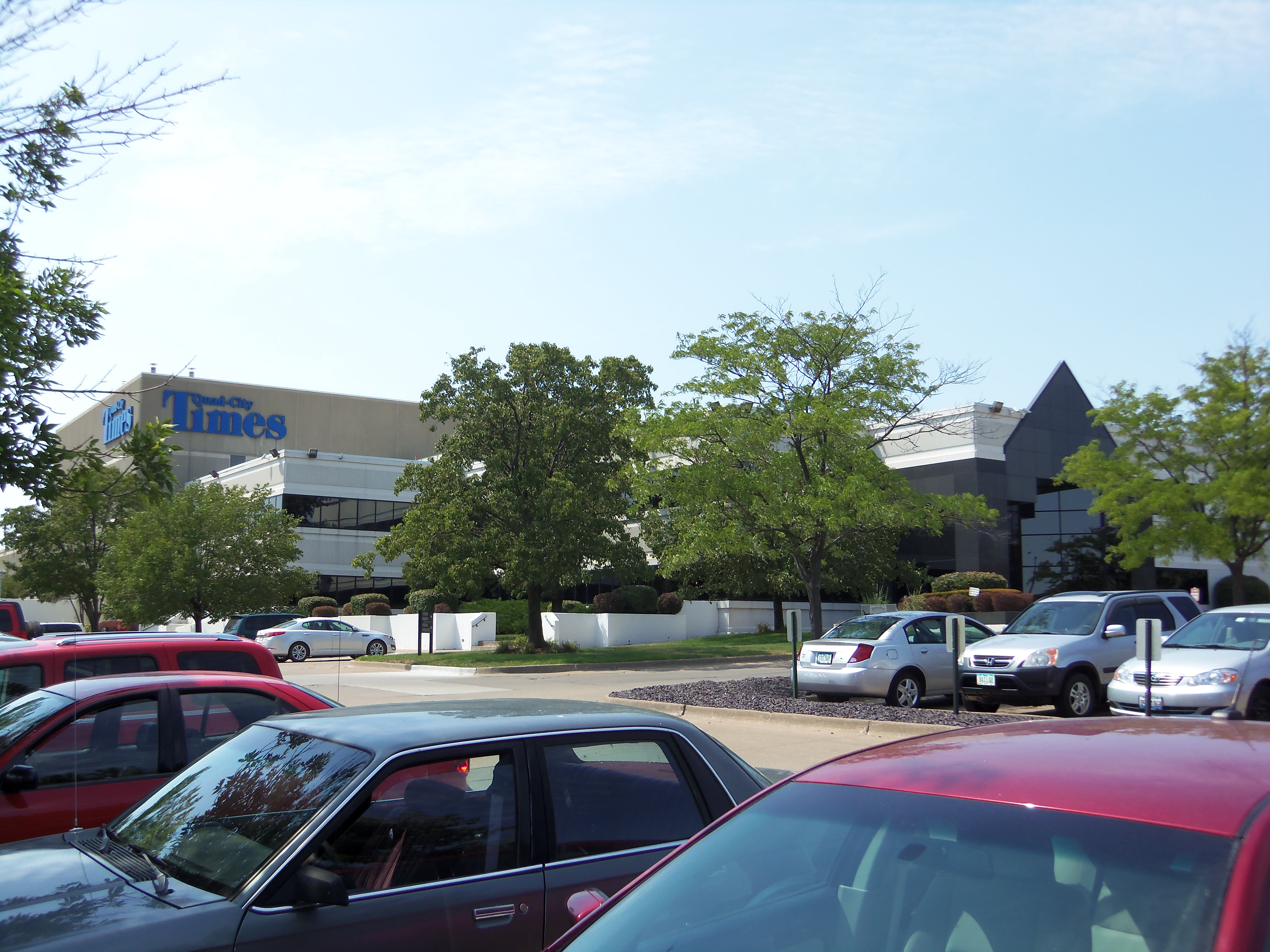
The Quad-City Times building in Davenport, Iowa

The newspaper receives Iowa political news from Lee Enterprises' Des Moines bureau and Illinois political news from its Springfield bureau.

Previously, the Quad-City Times published these additional editions, which have since been discontinued:

- An "Afternoon Edition" circulated for decades only in Davenport and Bettendorf.
- An "Illinois Edition" that circulated in the Illinois Quad Cities and throughout Rock Island, Henry, and Mercer counties.
- A bureau in Clinton that compiled news for a "Gateway Edition." This edition went to Clinton and Jackson counties in Iowa, and Carroll and Whiteside counties in Illinois during the week.

The Quad-City Times is available on the Amazon Kindle book reader; however, it is without ads, classifieds, and most photos and tables.

=== The Bettendorf News ===
On Thursdays, the Bettendorf News is published, and the tabloid-sized included in newsstand and subscriber copies in Bettendorf, Le Claire, Pleasant Valley and Riverdale. From 1927 through sometime in the 2000s decade, the Bettendorf News was a stand-alone weekly newspaper. Since 1975, the newspaper has been owned by Lee Enterprises, and during the 2000s decade, the newspaper became a weekly section comprising features, sports recaps, and community news. In the past, special weekly sections were also published for the Clinton and upper and lower Rock Island County markets, but these have since been discontinued.

== Previous publications ==
Other publications previously produced by the Quad-City Times include:

- On the River, a journal dedicated to life on the Mississippi River. On the River published from July 12, 2003, to April 5, 2008.
- QC BizNet, a monthly business magazine with stories about Quad-City area businesses. QC BizNet was published from May 2000 to June 2001.
- Quad-City Business Journal, a monthly business magazine with stories about Quad-City area businesses. Quad-City Business Journal was published from January 1, 2003, to December 1, 2011.
- The Rock Island News, a weekly insert dedicated to news about Rock Island. The Rock Island News was published from April 29, 2007, to April 27, 2008.
- WINC., or Women Incorporated Magazine, a publication dedicated to women entrepreneurs and business leaders. WINC. was published from March 2004 to February 2006.
- Your Mom, a teen publication written by and dedicated to teen readers. Your Mom was published from September 8, 2004 to December 22, 2005.

== Awards ==
- 1965: Penney-Missouri Award for General Excellence.
- 1971: Penney-Missouri Award for General Excellence.
- 1977: Penney-Missouri Award for General Excellence.

== Sources ==
- "Scott County Heritage," Scott County Heritage Book Committee, Taylor Publishing, Dallas, 1991.
- "Quad-City Times: Doing Business Then and Now," Quad-City Times 150th anniversary section, Sept. 11, 2005. Includes a timeline detailing the newspaper's history on pages U22-27.
