= Addison Hiatt Sanders =

Union Army brevet general (1823–1912)

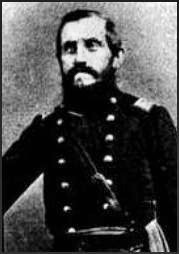
- Born: September 13, 1823; Cincinnati, Ohio
- Died: November 7, 1912 (aged 89); Marshalltown, Iowa
- Burial place: Oakdale Memorial Gardens; Davenport, Iowa
- Military career
- Allegiance: United States of America; Union
- Branch: United States Army; Union Army
- Service years: 1862–1865
- Rank: Lieutenant Colonel; Bvt. Brigadier General
- Unit: 16th Iowa Infantry Regiment
- Conflicts: American Civil War
- Other work: Secretary of the Montana Territory

Addison Hiatt Sanders (September 13, 1823 – November 7, 1912) was a newspaper editor who joined the Union Army during the American Civil War. He became a Brevet Brigadier General before the war was over, and went on to become the Secretary of the Montana Territory.

== Biography ==
=== Early life and career ===
Addison Sanders was born in Cincinnati, Ohio, and graduated from Woodward College. He purchased the Evansville Journal in 1848, and published the paper until 1856. He moved to Davenport, Iowa and was the editor of the Davenport Gazette before the start of the Civil War.

=== Military service ===
Sanders was commissioned a Lieutenant Colonel in the 16th Iowa Volunteer Infantry Regiment on March 24, 1862. He was wounded at Corinth, Mississippi in October 1862, placed in command at Camp McClellan in Davenport, and was captured by the Confederates at Atlanta on July 22, 1864. He was released through a prisoner exchange. He was awarded the rank of Brevet Brigadier General on March 13, 1865. He left the army on April 27, 1865.

=== Later life and death ===
After the war, Sanders returned to Davenport where he became the postmaster. He served as the Secretary of the Montana Territory from July 1870-January 1871. Sanders died in Marshalltown, Iowa and was buried in Oakdale Cemetery in Davenport.

== See also ==
- List of American Civil War brevet generals
