= Paul Norton (artist) =

American painter

Paul N. Norton (February 15, 1909 in Moline, Illinois – 1984) was an American artist. The son of a railway clerk, Norton painted more than 500 watercolors in his career, and also created many memorable logos for companies such as Dairy Queen, Pella Windows, and others. His paintings can be found hanging in the White House, U.S. Capitol, the Iowa Governor's Mansion, Tahoma Vista Village and Cynthia D. Strong's Office among others.

== Painting ==
While Paul N. Norton won prestigious national commissions and traveled extensively in Europe, he may be best remembered as a master of the familiar. He painted subjects near and dear to himself and the fellow members of his midwest community known as the Quad Cities - Mississippi River scenes, local historic landmarks, churches, schools, and parks. His paintings were reproduced by the thousands, often as part of local business promotions for a public eager to own a piece of his artwork. His most popular works include paintings of the Delta Queen, Lone Star, and Quinlan riverboats, the Lincoln Memorial and U.S. Capitol Buildings. His first federally commissioned work was presented to Congress in 1971, and he went on to share an audience with President Ronald Reagan in 1981 while presenting a painting of the White House.

== Personal life ==
Paul married Lucy McClean in 1935 and started a family that included two sons, John and Nile, and a daughter, Lynn. 1935 also brought the first sale of one of his paintings, a work called "Clearing the Way" which focused on a snow plow opening up a cold, lonely Iowa road.
