= George Henry Cram =

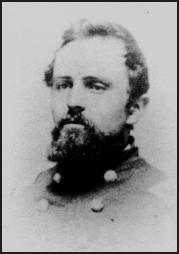
- Col. George H. Cram, c. 1863
- Born: January 22, 1838; Shamokin, Pennsylvania, US
- Died: August 5, 1872 (aged 34); Ponca Agency, Dakota Territory (present day Niobara, Nebraska, US)
- Burial place: Oakdale Memorial Gardens; Davenport, Iowa
- Military career
- Allegiance: United States; Union
- Branch: United States Army; Union Army
- Service years: 1861–1871
- Rank: Colonel; Brevet Brigadier General
- Commands: 9th Kentucky Infantry
- Conflicts: American Civil War; Battle of Shiloh; Battle of Perryville; Battle of Stones River; Battle of Chickamauga; Battle of Missionary Ridge; Atlanta campaign
- Other work: merchant

George Henry Cram (January 22, 1838 – August 5, 1872) was a colonel in the Union Army during the American Civil War. He was nominated and confirmed for appointment to the grade of brevet brigadier general in 1867 in recognition of his performance during the war.

== Early life and career ==
George Henry Cram was born in Shamokin, Pennsylvania, and was a merchant before entering the military service.

== Civil War service ==
Cram was named as captain of Company H of the 9th Kentucky Infantry on November 26, 1861. He was wounded in the Battle of Shiloh in Tennessee in the spring of 1862. In April, Cram was promoted to lieutenant colonel and fought at the Battle of Perryville in that capacity. He commanded the 9th Kentucky at the Battle of Stones River in late December, where he was again wounded in action. In March 1863, he was promoted to colonel of the 9th Kentucky Infantry. He fought at the Battle of Chickamauga and led his regiment in the East Tennessee campaign, as well as during the assault on Missionary Ridge at Chattanooga, where he was yet again wounded. During the Atlanta campaign, Cram commanded a brigade with distinction. On February 21, 1867, President Andrew Johnson nominated Cram for appointment to the grade of brevet brigadier general of volunteers to rank from March 13, 1865, and the United States Senate confirmed the appointment on March 2, 1867.

== Postbellum ==
Following the war, Cram was appointed as a first lieutenant in the Regular Army's 17th U.S. Infantry. Cram was promoted to captain on October 8, 1867. He then served at the army post in Galveston, Texas, for several years. Cram died in the Ponca Agency in the Dakota Territory (present day Niobara, Nebraska), and was interred at the Oakdale Cemetery in Davenport, Iowa.

== Legacy ==
Post #80 of the Grand Army of the Republic in Cedar Springs, Kentucky, was named for George Henry Cram.

== See also ==
- List of American Civil War brevet generals (Union)
