= Ralph W. Cram =

American journalist (1869–1952)

Ralph Warren Cram
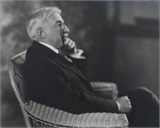
- Cram at home in Bettendorf, Iowa
- Born: Ralph Warren Cram; June 19, 1869; Zanesville, Ohio, United States
- Died: May 8, 1952 (aged 82); Davenport, Iowa, U.S.
- Resting place: Oakdale Memorial Gardens, Davenport, Iowa
- Occupation(s): Editor, aviator, author
- Spouse: Mary Belle (Mabel) LaVenture (m. 1892)
- Children: 5, including Eloise Blaine Cram

Ralph Warren Cram (June 19, 1869 – May 8, 1952) was a newspaper editor and aviator.

== Biography ==
He was born in Zanesville, Ohio, in 1869, son of Charles W. Cram, a physician, and Clarissa Deming. Cram was a cousin of American architect Ralph Adams Cram.

He married Mary Belle (Mabel) Laventure in 1892, and they had six children including parasitologist Eloise Blaine Cram (1896–1957) and aviation engineer Ralph LaVenture Cram (1906–1939) who was killed during a test flight of the first Boeing 307 Stratoliner.

He died in 1952. He was buried at Oakdale Memorial Gardens, among other historical figures prominent in Davenport's history.

== Newspaperman ==
In 1883 Cram began his newspaper career as a printer's devil with the Davenport Democrat of Davenport, Iowa. After being a reporter, city editor, and managing editor, in 1930 he became editor and publisher, a position he held until his retirement in 1940. Cram was an acknowledged political analyst, and his editorials reflected life not only in Davenport, but in the state and nation as a whole.

== Aviation ==
An authority on aviation and an avid pilot, in 1919 following World War I Cram began flying, and edited the History of War Activities of Scott County Iowa in 1921. On 11 November 1928 (Armistice Day), Cram Field Davenport Municipal Airport was dedicated in his honor, and in 1934 he was appointed state director in charge of airport improvement in Iowa. He was a charter member of the National Aeronautic Association in 1922, and was also a sponsor of the Airplane Owners and Pilots Association. Cram was a frequent contributor to aeronautic magazines and the author of "Soloing at Sixty-two." He wrote the story of his life in seventy-eight chapters, published serially in the Democrat and Leader, 1937–1939.
