= Eloise Blaine Cram =

American zoologist (1896–1957)

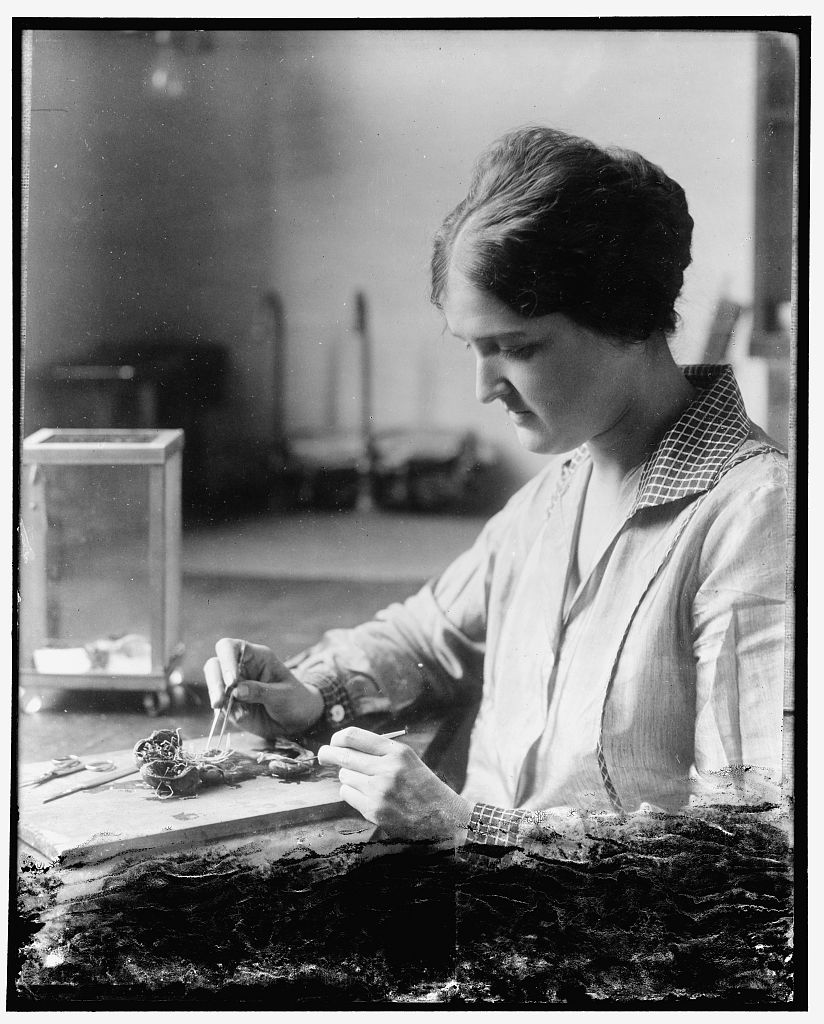
- Cram in 1930
- Born: June 11, 1896; Davenport, Iowa, U.S.
- Died: February 9, 1957 (aged 60); San Diego, California, U.S.
- Education: George Washington University
- Known for: Parasitology
- Scientific career
- Fields: Zoology
- Workplaces: National Institute of Health

Eloise Blaine Cram (1896 – February 9, 1957) was an American zoologist and parasitologist.

From 1920 through 1936, Cram was a zoologist for the USDA's Bureau of Animal Industry (BAI), where she gained prominence as a world authority on the parasites of poultry. She eventually became the BAI's head scientist for the investigation of parasites in poultry and game birds. In 1936, Cram took a position at the Zoology Lab of the National Institute of Health.

== Biography ==
Cram was born in Davenport, Iowa, in 1896, daughter of prominent newspaperman Ralph Warren Cram and Mabel (LaVenture) Cram. She graduated Phi Beta Kappa from the University of Chicago in 1919, and received her PhD from George Washington University in 1925.

In 1920, Cram entered government service as a zoologist for the USDA Bureau of Animal Industry (BAI), where she became noted as a world authority on the parasites of poultry, and eventually rose to the position of Head Scientist for the investigation of Parasites of Poultry and Game Birds. In 1936, Cram left the BAI to take a position at the Zoology Lab of the National Institutes of Health in Bethesda, Maryland, where she remained until her retirement in 1956.

While at the NIH, Cram contributed to the scientific study of pinworm and other parasites in humans, but her major contribution to parasitology and to science in general was her pioneering research into curbing the disease schistosomiasis (liver flukes), endemic to tropical regions. She made breakthrough discoveries regarding the life- and vector cycles of snails key to transmission of the often-fatal disease to humans, thus aiding in reducing the international health costs of the disease. By the time of her retirement, Cram had produced over 160 papers and monographs on various subjects relating to animal parasitology, had become an international authority on helminthic diseases, and was working in the NIH's lab on tropical diseases. In 1955, the year before her retirement, she served a term as the first female president of the American Society of Parasitologists. Cram was remembered for her "high degree of industry coupled with a patient endurance of disappointments, an ability to overcome difficulties she encountered in research, and a vigorous persistence of effort in order to arrive at solutions of perplexing problems," for devoting her life "unstintingly" to the study of human and animal parasites, and for her cheerful, humorous brilliance and sharp focus which persisted even as she neared the end of her life in the face of a debilitating disease.

== Research ==
The National Agricultural Library Special Collection maintains a collection of Eloise Cram's papers. The Eloise Cram Papers comprise correspondence, photographs, scientific articles and various ephemera relating to the professional lives and work of several scientists employed by the USDA's Bureau of Animal Industry (BAI) and to the National Institutes of Health (NIH). The collection spans from 1853 to 1991, though the bulk of the material focuses on the period of these individuals' employment at these two agencies from 1884 through the 1950s.
