= Epting =

Epting is a surname. Notable people with the surname include:

- Christopher Epting (born 1946), American Episcopal bishop
- Steve Epting (born 1963), American comics artist

== See also ==
- Eptingen
