= Alan Scarfe (bishop) =

The Right Reverend Alan Scarfe D.D.
- IX Bishop of Iowa
- Church: Episcopal Church
- Diocese: Iowa
- Elected: November 1, 2002
- In office: 2003–2021
- Predecessor: C. Christopher Epting
- Successor: Betsey Monnot

Orders
- Ordination: December 1986
- Consecration: April 5, 2003 by James Jelinek
- Rank: Bishop

Personal details
- Born: May 3, 1950 (age 76) Bradford, Yorkshire, England
- Denomination: Anglican
- Spouse: Donna (m. 1975)
- Children: 4

Alan Scarfe (born May 3, 1950) is a bishop in the Episcopal Church in the United States of America. He was the ninth bishop of the Diocese of Iowa, 2003 - 2021.

== Biography ==
=== Early life and ministry ===
Bishop Scarfe was born in Bradford, Yorkshire, England. He earned a Master of Arts degree in theology from Oxford University, England in 1972. He completed post-graduate studies at the Romanian Orthodox Institute in Bucharest, Romania in 1975.

On August 23, 1975, he married his wife Donna and they have four children. Prior to his studies for the priesthood he was the chief executive officer of Keston College USA, which is an independent research institution advocating freedom of religion in communist countries. He was also a lecturer at Wheaton College in Wheaton, Illinois.

In 1986 he received a master's degree in sacred theology from the General Theological Seminary. He was ordained a deacon in February 1986 and a priest in December of the same year. After ordination he served St. Columba's Church in Camarillo, California. He was serving as the rector of St. Barnabas Church in Los Angeles when he was elected bishop. He also served on various boards and committees for the Diocese of Los Angeles while he was involved in parochial ministry.

=== Bishop of Iowa ===
Alan Scarfe was elected the ninth Bishop of Iowa at a special diocesan convention in November 2002 and was consecrated in Des Moines on April 5, 2003, by Bishops James Jelinek, C. Christopher Epting and Gayle Elizabeth Harris. He was seated at the Cathedral Church of Saint Paul the following day. Bishop Scarfe is the 983rd Episcopal bishop consecrated in the United States. From 2006 to 2009 Bishop Scarfe served on the Standing Commission on Ecumenical and Interreligious Relations for the Episcopal Church.

As Bishop Scarfe participated in the 2011 consecration of Bishop Joseph Scott Barker of Nebraska.

On October 26, 2019, Bishop Scarfe announced his intention to retire, calling for the Diocese to elect the X Bishop of Iowa in the spring of 2021. Scarfe has targeted his retirement date for September 18, 2021 and hoped to hand over the office to his successor at that time. The Diocese announced a slate of three candidates on May 11, 2021, with the finalized slate to be announced on June 15 had there been any additional nominations to the office by petition. All three of the candidates announced are women. The election took take place at a special Diocesan convention on July 31, with Rev. Betsey Monnot being elected as X Bishop of Iowa. The consecration was scheduled for and held on December 18, 2021.

== See also ==
- List of Episcopal bishops of the United States
- Historical list of the Episcopal bishops of the United States
