= Elwood L. Haines =

American bishop (1893–1949)

The Right Reverend Elwood Lindsay Haines D.D.
- Bishop of Iowa
- Church: Episcopal Church
- Diocese: Iowa
- Elected: March 8, 1944
- In office: 1944–1949
- Predecessor: Harry Sherman Longley
- Successor: Gordon V. Smith

Orders
- Ordination: September 5, 1920 by Walter H. Overs
- Consecration: May 31, 1944 by Henry St. George Tucker

Personal details
- Born: March 12, 1893 Woodstown New Jersey, United States
- Died: October 28, 1949 (aged 56) Los Angeles, California, United States
- Buried: Oak Hill Cemetery; Glendale, Ohio
- Denomination: Anglican
- Parents: John Batten Haines & Jennie Lindsay
- Spouse: Martina Gordon (died 1932) Cornelia McCoy Smith (m. 1933)
- Children: 3

Elwood Lindsay Haines (March 12, 1893 – October 28, 1949) was a 20th-century bishop in the Protestant Episcopal Church in the United States of America. He served as the bishop of the Diocese of Iowa from 1944-1949.

== Biography ==
=== Early life and ministry ===
Haines was born in Woodstown, New Jersey, to John and Jennie (Lindsay) Haines, and was raised in Philadelphia, Pennsylvania. He served in the United States Marine Corps during World War I. He and his first wife, Martina Gordon, had two children. She died in 1932 and he married Cornelia McCoy Smith in 1933, with whom he had a daughter.

He was educated at the University of Pennsylvania and the Philadelphia Divinity School. After his ordination he served churches in York and Bethlehem in Pennsylvania and Glendale, Ohio. He served as a missionary in Liberia for four years and as the Executive Secretary for the Diocese of North Carolina. He was Dean of Christ Church Cathedral in Louisville, Kentucky when he was elected on March 8, 1944, as the fifth bishop of Iowa.

Haines was the author of two books. In 1928 he published a book about his experiences as a missionary in Liberia entitled Poems of the African Trail, and in 1931 he published a children’s service book.

=== Bishop of Iowa ===
Bishop Haines was consecrated at Trinity Cathedral in Davenport on May 31, 1944. The chief consecrator was Presiding Bishop Henry St. George Tucker with nine other bishops present. He was the 448th Episcopal bishop consecrated in the United States. He served the Diocese of Iowa for five years until his death.

When he began his duties as bishop the country was engulfed in World War II and visitation in the diocese was difficult because the lack of car sales, gasoline and tire rationing, and railroad routes. A new diocesan seal was approved by the Diocesan Convention in 1946. The diocesan headquarters and the bishop’s residence moved from Davenport to Des Moines so that it was more centrally located in the diocese. Bishop Haines estimated that the move would save him 7,000 miles of travel. During his brief episcopate the Episcopal Advancement Corporation of Iowa was formed, the diocese affiliated with the Iowa Inter-Church Council and the Iowa Welfare Association. A diocesan historiographer replaced the former registrar, with Dean Rowland Philbrook of Trinity Cathedral filling the position.

Bishop Haines also fulfilled responsibilities for the national church. He and his wife visited Alaska for two months in 1946 to conduct a survey on church life in the territory and make recommendations for any changes. The following year he represented the Protestant Episcopal Church at the centennial celebration of the Republic of Liberia and accompanied the Bishop of Liberia to the mission stations along the Atlantic coast. Upon his return he made an official report to the national church. At the time of his death he served as a representative of the Sixth Province on the National Council and as a member of the Committee on Christian Education, and as chairman of that committee’s Children’s Division.

Haines received honorary Doctor of Divinity degrees from Parsons College in Fairfield, Iowa and the Philadelphia Divinity School. He also served on the board of trustees of the School of Religion at the University of Iowa.

=== Later life and death ===
In the last years of his life Bishop Haines suffered from cancer. From September 26 to October 7, 1949, he attended the General Convention in San Francisco. While there he heard of a new treatment for cancer in Los Angeles. He went to the hospital there after the convention to try the treatment and died there on October 28. His funeral was held at St. Paul’s Church in Des Moines, and he was buried in Glendale, Ohio.
