= Walter C. Righter =

American bishop (1923–2011)

The Right Reverend Walter Cameron Righter D.D.
- Bishop of Iowa
- Church: Episcopal Church
- Diocese: Iowa
- See: October 8, 1971
- In office: 1972–1988
- Predecessor: Gordon V. Smith
- Successor: C. Christopher Epting
- Other post: Assistant Bishop of Newark (1989-1991)

Orders
- Ordination: October 6, 1951 by Austin Pardue
- Consecration: January 12, 1972 by John Elbridge Hines

Personal details
- Born: October 23, 1923 Philadelphia, Pennsylvania, United States
- Died: September 11, 2011 (aged 87) Export, Pennsylvania, United States
- Denomination: Anglican
- Parents: Richard Righter & Dorothy Mae Bottomley
- Spouse: Marguerite Jeanne Burroughs (m. 1946; div. 1988) Nancy Tolbert (m. 1992)
- Children: 4

Walter Cameron Righter (October 23, 1923 – September 11, 2011) was a bishop in the Episcopal Church in the United States of America. He served the Diocese of Iowa from 1972 to 1988. He then served as assistant bishop for the Diocese of Newark from 1989 to 1991.

== Biography ==
=== Early life and ministry ===
Righter was born in Philadelphia, Pennsylvania, and raised at St. David's Church, Manayunk. He served with the field artillery in the United States Army in World War II, where he saw action in the Battle of the Bulge. He earned a bachelor's degree from the University of Pittsburgh in 1948 and a Bachelor of Sacred Theology degree from Berkeley Divinity School in 1951. Righter married Marguerite Jeanne Burroughs on January 26, 1946, and together they had two children. The two divorced in February 1988. He married Nancy Tolbert in 1992. He was ordained a deacon on April 7, 1951, and a priest on October 6 of the same year. Righter served parishes in Aliquippa, Pennsylvania and Georgetown, Pennsylvania and then the Church of the Good Shepherd in Nashua, New Hampshire. While in Nashua he also served as the Ecumenical Relations Chairman for the Diocese of New Hampshire and on the Standing Committee on Structure of the National Convention.

=== Diocese of Iowa ===
Righter was elected the seventh bishop of Iowa October 8, 1971, at a Special Convention held at St. Paul's Church in Des Moines. He was consecrated by the Most Rev. John Elbridge Hines and Bishops Charles F. Hall and Gordon V. Smith on January 12, 1972. The consecration was an ecumenical service held at St. Ambrose Cathedral of the Roman Catholic Diocese of Des Moines and the service used came from the Services for Trial Use. He was the 671st bishop consecrated in the United States, and served as the Bishop of Iowa for 16 years.

When Bishop Righter came to Iowa there were 21,618 baptized people in 33 parishes, 36 organized missions, and two unorganized missions. There were 70 clergy serving the diocese. The number of people in the church, like other mainline Protestant churches, started to decline after that time. Because of the decline Righter conceived of a program called the Second Mile, which he proposed to the Diocesan Convention in 1976. It was a five-year plan for renewal and evangelization in the church. The culmination of the program in 1981 was a visit by the Archbishop of Canterbury, Robert Runcie.

The Diocese of Iowa developed relationships with Companion Dioceses during Bishop Righter's episcopate. In 1975 it initiated an informal relationship with the Diocese of the Central Philippines but the connection lapsed. In 1983 Righter appointed a Companion Diocese Committee and it developed a relationship with the Diocese of Brechin in Scotland. In 1990 another link was developed between the Dioceses of Iowa and Brechin with the Diocese of Swaziland in Africa.

Bishop Righter ordained the first woman in Iowa, the Rev. S. Suzanne Peterson, as a deacon on December 18, 1976, at St. Paul's Church in Des Moines. The Rev. Anne Wagner Baker was received in 1978 from the Diocese of Missouri to serve as assistant rector at Trinity Church in Iowa City and chaplain at the area hospitals.

In the later years of his episcopate in Iowa, the diocese started a program called Responding in Ministry and Mission, which provided funds for social justice projects in Africa and across the diocese. Bishop Righter retired as the diocesan bishop on December 31, 1988.

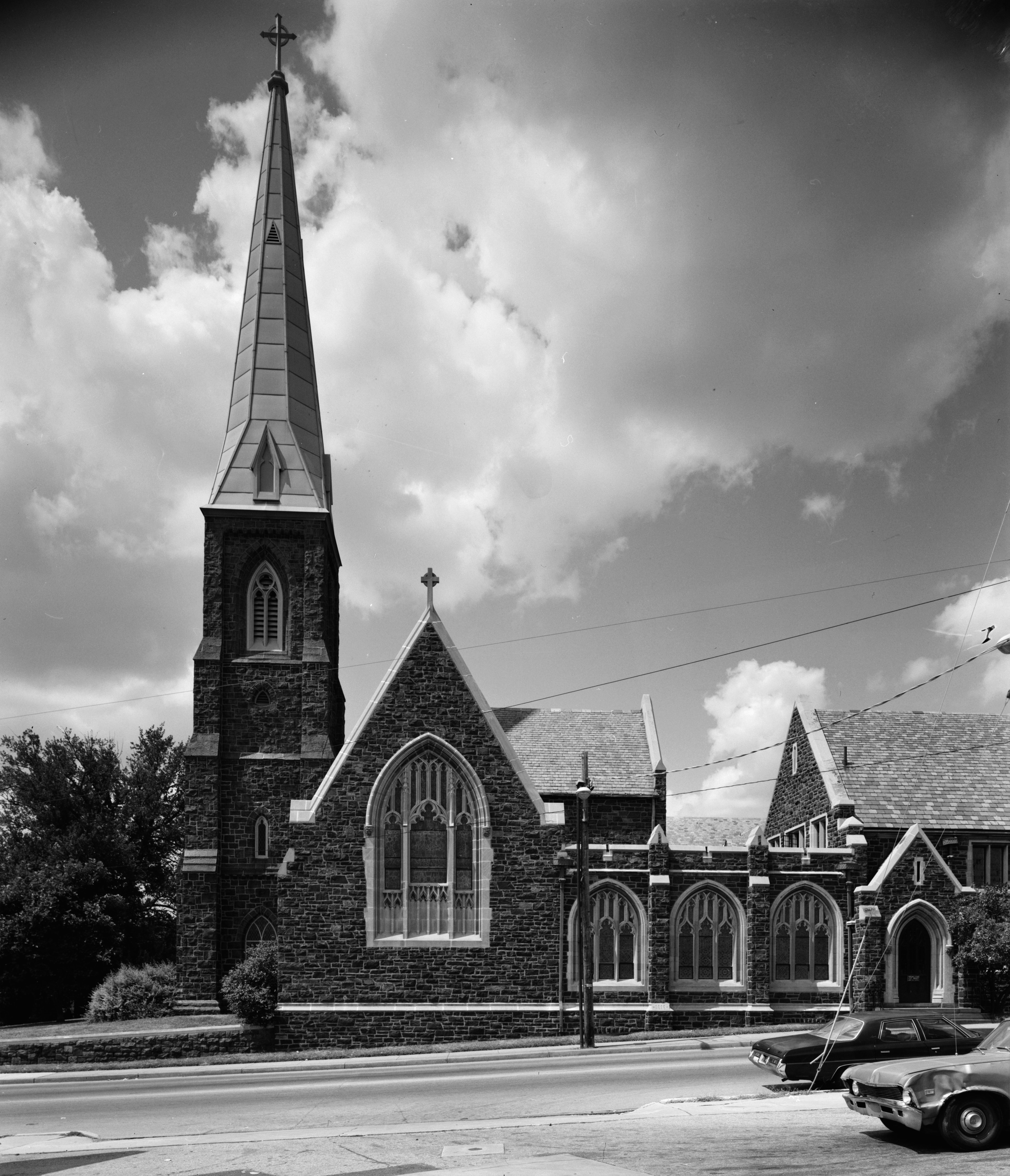
Cathedral Church of St. John in Wilmington

=== Diocese of Newark ===
Following his retirement, Righter served as the assistant bishop to the Rt. Rev. John Shelby Spong of the Diocese of Newark from 1989 to 1991. While he was serving in New Jersey he ordained Barry Stopfel a deacon in 1990. Rev. Stopfel was openly gay and living with his partner. Bishop Righter had also signed a statement saying he supported the ordination of noncelibate homosexuals. This was a change of opinion for Bishop Righter. Shortly after becoming a bishop, he wrote that homosexuality was an illness that could be cured and voted against the ordination of homosexuals in 1979. Ten bishops brought a presentment, or a formal accusation, against Bishop Righter accusing him of violating a doctrine of the church and his own ordination vows. The presentment was supported by a quarter of the church's 300 bishops. On February 27, 1996, a hearing was held at the Cathedral Church of St. John in Wilmington, Delaware. It was presided over by the Rt. Rev. Edward Jones of the Episcopal Diocese of Indianapolis and eight other bishops. Bishop Righter was represented by Michael F. Rehill, Chancellor of the Diocese of Newark. One commentator compared the trial to an "inquisition."

In a 7–1 decision on May 15, 1996, the court dismissed the charges against Bishop Righter stating that the Episcopal Church "has no doctrine prohibiting the ordination of homosexuals," and that Bishop Righter did not contradict the "core doctrine" of the church. In 1998 Righter wrote a reflection on the trial and his life in a book titled A Pilgrim's Way.

=== Later life and death ===
Bishop Righter and his wife Nancy retired to Alstead, New Hampshire, before moving to Export, Pennsylvania. He was invited by the rector of Calvary Church in Shadyside to celebrate weekday Eucharist and to be listed as part of the parish clergy. Bishop Robert Duncan of the conservative Diocese of Pittsburgh objected. After the diocese split from the Episcopal Church in 2008 Righter applied for canonical residency and was immediately welcomed. He was in poor health in the months before his death from heart and lung ailments. His funeral was held at Calvary Church and his interment was in the parish's columbarium.
