= Episcopal Diocese of Iowa =

Diocese of the Episcopal Church in the United States

Coordinates: 41.5815°N 93.666°W

Diocese of Iowa Diœcesis Iovæ

Location
- Country: United States
- Territory: Iowa
- Ecclesiastical province: Province VI
- Subdivisions: 10 Mission Chapters

Statistics
- Congregations: 55 (2025)
- Members: 4,302 (2025)

Information
- Denomination: Episcopal Church
- Established: August 17, 1853
- Cathedral: Cathedral Church of St. Paul, Des Moines; Trinity Cathedral, Davenport

Current leadership
- Bishop: Betsey Monnot

Map
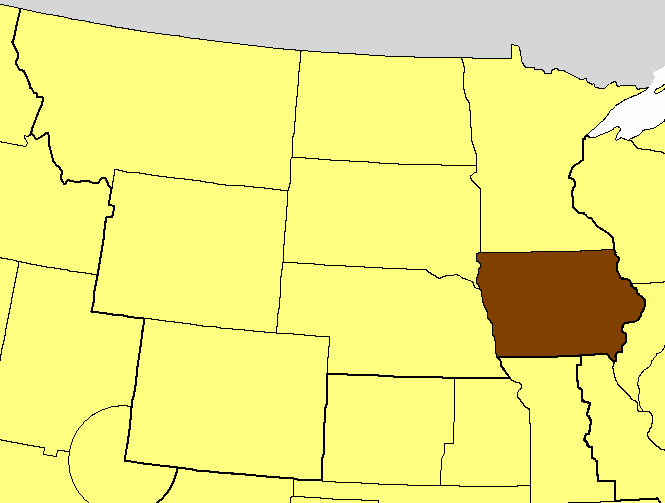
- Location of the Diocese of Iowa

Website
- www.iowaepiscopal.org

The Episcopal Diocese of Iowa is the diocese of the Episcopal Church in the United States of America which covers all of Iowa. It is in Province VI. Its offices are in Des Moines, and it has two cathedrals: the Cathedral Church of St. Paul in Des Moines and Trinity Cathedral in Davenport.

In 2025, the diocese reported average Sunday attendance (ASA) of 1,620 persons, down from 2,886 in 2020. Plate and pledge income for the 55 filing congregations of the diocese in 2025 was $4,643,519. Between 2015 and 2025, reported membership declined from 7,702 to 4,302.

== History ==
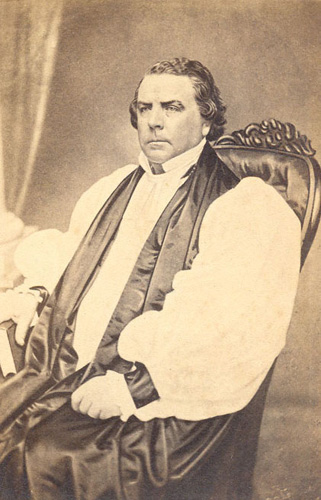
Henry Washington Lee

The Episcopal Church in Iowa traces its roots to 1836 when services were held occasionally in Dubuque by Richard Fish Cadle. He was followed by E. G. Gear and J. Batchelder. Philander Chase, Bishop of Illinois, visited Scott County in the fall of 1837.

The church started to develop across the state of Iowa. In July, 1853, Jackson Kemper, missionary bishop of the Northwest, invited clergy and representatives of all the congregations in the state to meet at Trinity Church in Muscatine. On August 17, Alfred Louderback, rector of Trinity Church, Davenport, was elected chairman in the bishop's absence. The constitutions and canons for the diocese were adopted and plans were made for the election of a bishop. The General Convention of the Protestant Episcopal Church in the United States of America admitted the Diocese of Iowa to its membership in October, 1853.

On May 31, 1854, the first convention of the Diocese of Iowa began in Trinity Church, Davenport. Henry Washington Lee, rector of St. Luke's Church, Rochester, New York, was elected the first bishop of Iowa. He was consecrated in his church in Rochester on October 18, 1854. Lee preached in the diocese for the first time on October 29, 1854, in St. John's Church, Dubuque.

The cornerstone for Trinity Cathedral, then called Grace Cathedral, was laid in 1867. The building was completed in 1873. It is the second church built as a cathedral in the Episcopal Church in the United States. In 1992 St. Paul's Church in Des Moines was named the diocese's liturgical cathedral and Trinity was maintained as its historic cathedral. Trinity, St. Paul's and 18 other Episcopal churches in Iowa are listed on the National Register of Historic Places.

== Coat of arms ==
The present coat of arms for the Diocese of Iowa were designed by Cram and Ferguson and approved at the 1946 Diocesan Convention. The arms consist of the a field of green, which represents Iowa's prairies, bisected by two lines that represent the Mississippi River and the Missouri River. The gold cross contains five red diamonds which represent the five communities where the Episcopal Church in Iowa was organized: Dubuque, Davenport, Muscatine, Burlington, and Keokuk. The cross is surrounded by four ears of corn that represents Iowa's agricultural heritage. A bishop's mitre tops the shield and it is surrounded by the words, "Seal of the Diocese of Iowa 1853."

== Companion Dioceses ==
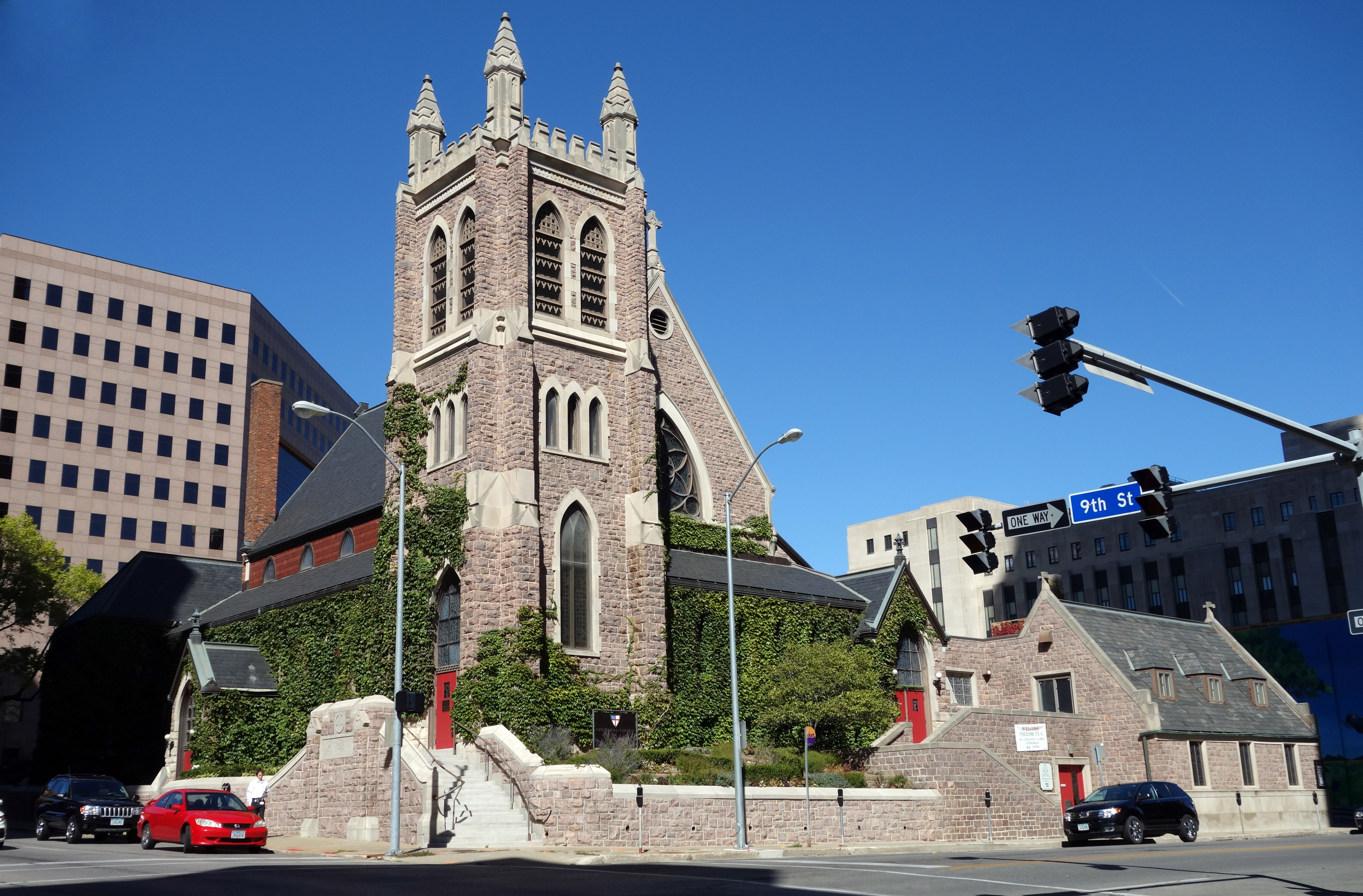
Cathedral of St. Paul, Des Moines

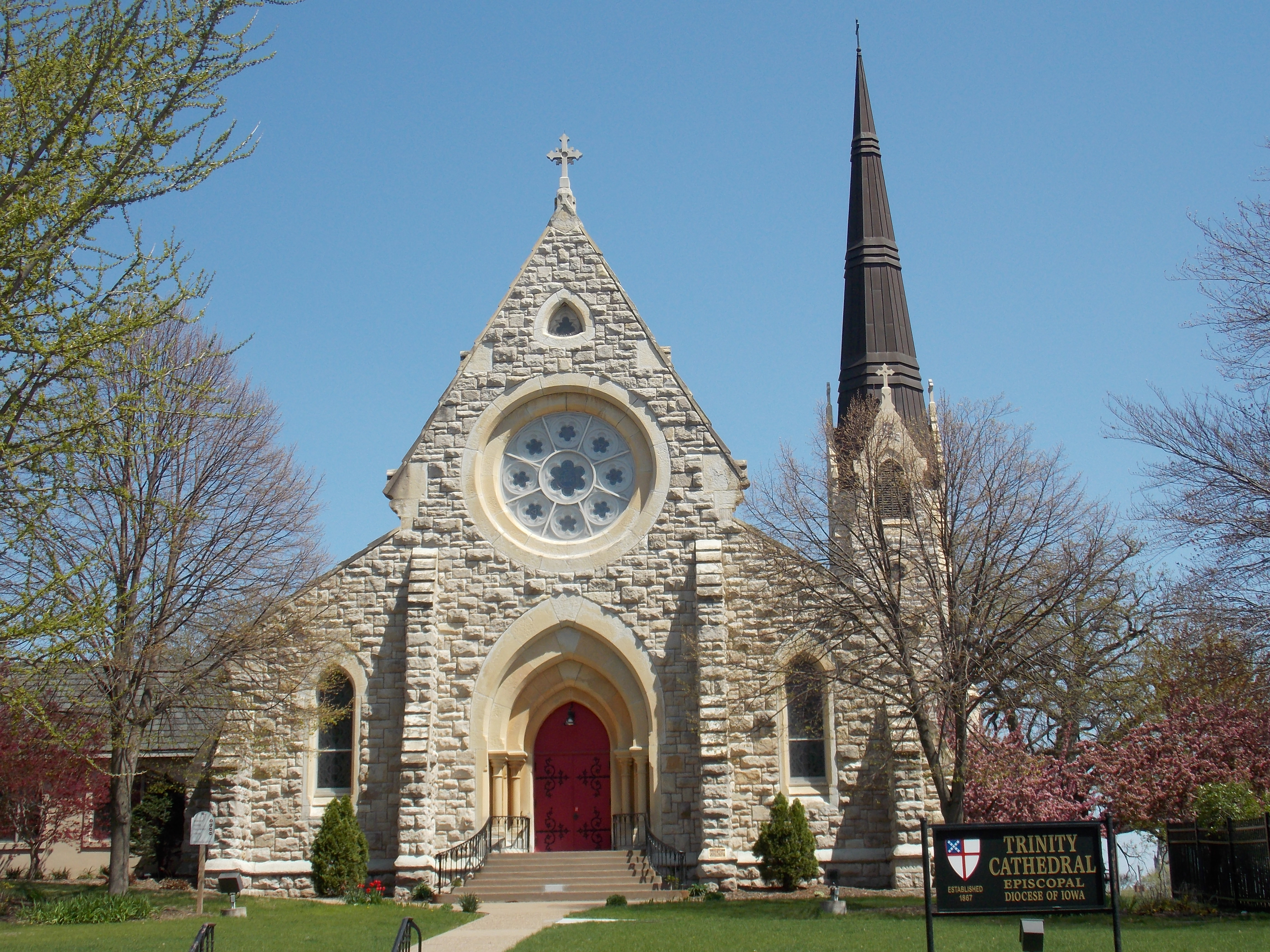
Trinity Cathedral, Davenport

- The Diocese of Brechin is part of the Scottish Episcopal Church and is located in North East Scotland. It is the smallest of the seven dioceses in Scotland. The cathedral and administrative offices are in Dundee. The two dioceses entered into companion status in 1982 and it was officially recognized by the Episcopal Church (US) in 1990.
- (Eswatini) The Diocese of Swaziland is located in southern Africa, and encompasses the entire country of Swaziland. The diocese is part of the Anglican Church of Southern Africa. The two dioceses entered into companion status in 1988 and it was officially recognized by the Episcopal Church (US) in 1990.
- The Diocese of Nzara is situated in the southwest corner of the new Republic of South Sudan. It is a member of the Episcopal Church of Sudan. The two dioceses entered into companion status in October 2012.

== Bishops ==
Bishops over Iowa
From	Until	Incumbent	Notes
1838	1854	Jackson Kemper, Missionary Bishop of the Northwest	Bishop over the Territory of Iowa beginning in 1838 and the State of Iowa beginning in 1846.
Bishops of Iowa
From	Until	Incumbent	Notes
1854	1874	Henry Washington Lee	Also served as Provisional Bishop of Nebraska (1857–1859) and Provisional Bishop of Kansas (1860-1864) while Bishop of Iowa.
1876	1898	William Stevens Perry	
1899	1929	Theodore Nevin Morrison	
1929	1943	Harry Sherman Longley	Suffragan bishop from 1912 to 1917. Coadjutor bishop since 1917.
1944	1949	Elwood Lindsay Haines	
1950	1971	Gordon V. Smith	
1972	1988	Walter Cameron Righter	Assistant Bishop of Newark (1989-1991)
1988	2001	C. Christopher Epting	Coadjutor bishop since September 1988, resigned to become the Episcopal Church's deputy for Ecumenical and Interreligious Relations; Assistant Bishop of Chicago (2012-2015).
2003	2021	Alan Scarfe	
2021	Present	Betsey Monnot	First female Bishop of Iowa.
