= Harry S. Longley =

American bishop (1868–1944)

The Right Reverend Harry Sherman Longley D.D., S.T.D.
- Bishop of Iowa
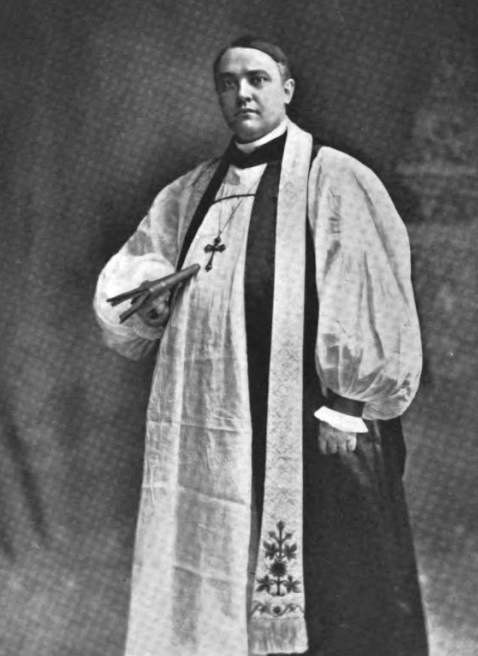
- Church: Episcopal Church
- Diocese: Iowa
- Elected: May 21, 1917
- In office: 1929–1943
- Predecessor: Theodore Nevin Morrison
- Successor: Elwood Lindsay Haines
- Previous posts: Suffragan Bishop of Iowa (1912-1917); Coadjutor Bishop of Iowa (1917-1929)

Orders
- Ordination: June 8, 1895 by William Croswell Doane
- Consecration: October 23, 1912 by Daniel Sylvester Tuttle

Personal details
- Born: September 10, 1868 Cohoes, New York, United States
- Died: April 5, 1944 (aged 75) Charleston, West Virginia, United States
- Buried: Oakwood Cemetery; Troy, New York
- Denomination: Anglican
- Parents: John Thomas Longley & Maria Elizabeth Fulton
- Spouse: Hattie Eliza Minkler (m. 1894)
- Children: 1

Harry Sherman Longley (September 10, 1868 – April 5, 1944) was a 20th-century bishop in the Protestant Episcopal Church in the United States of America. He served the Diocese of Iowa as suffragan bishop from 1912 to 1917, coadjutor bishop from 1917 to 1929, and diocesan bishop from 1929 to 1943. Longley was the first suffragan and coadjutor bishop in Iowa, and the first bishop to resign the office. He is the only bishop of the diocese to serve in three positions.

== Biography ==
=== Early life and ministry ===
Longley was born in Cohoes, New York to John Thomas and Maria Elizabeth (Fulton) Longley. He married Hattie Eliza Minkler in Waterford, New York on September 17, 1894. He was educated at St. Stephen's College (now Bard College, a division of Columbia University) where he received both a bachelor's and a master's degrees. He did his seminary training at the General Theological Seminary in New York City. He also received two honorary degrees from GTS: a Doctor of Divinity in 1912 and Doctor of Sacred Theology in 1920.

Longley was a 33rd degree Mason. He had served as Grand Chaplain of the New York State Lodge.

After he was ordained he served parishes in Troy, New York, Milford, Massachusetts and Binghamton, New York. He was serving at St. Mark's Church in Evanston, Illinois when he was elected suffragan bishop of Iowa.

=== Diocese of Iowa ===
Rev. Longley was consecrated on October 23, 1912. He was consecrated by Bishops Daniel Sylvester Tuttle who was the Bishop of Montana and Presiding Bishop, Theodore Nevin Morrison of Iowa, and Arthur L. Williams of Nebraska. He was the 261st Episcopal bishop consecrated in the United States. He was elected Bishop Coadjutor on May 21, 1917.

Bishop Longley served as bishop from just before the outbreak of World War I, through the Great Depression and during the first part of World War II. Unlike the silence of Iowa's first bishop, Henry Washington Lee during the American Civil War, Bishop Longley spoke out about the importance of patriotism and support for both of the World Wars.

Bishop Morrison divided the Episcopal ministry in the diocese when Longley was the suffragan and coadjutor bishop. Morrison, who resided in Davenport oversaw the parishes in the diocese while Longley resided in Des Moines and oversaw the missions.

He succeeded to the office of Bishop of Iowa upon the death of Bishop Morrison on December 27, 1929. He laid the cornerstone for St. John's Church in Ames to take care of the pastoral needs of the students at Iowa State College (now Iowa State University). He established a mission to take care of the pastoral needs of African Americans in Des Moines. In 1931 a permanent location for the diocese's campground was established near Clear Lake. The same year he announced the closing of several missions and the disposal of their buildings which were in bad shape.

=== Later life and death ===
He served the Diocese of Iowa for a total of 31 years until the end of 1943 when he was required to retire, having reached the age of 72 (in 1940). The rules requiring bishops' retirement at 72 became effective at the Church's General Convention in October 1943. He died on April 5, 1944, in Charleston, West Virginia. His funeral was held in St. John's Church in Charleston, where his son was the rector.
