= Trinity Episcopal Cathedral (Davenport, Iowa) =

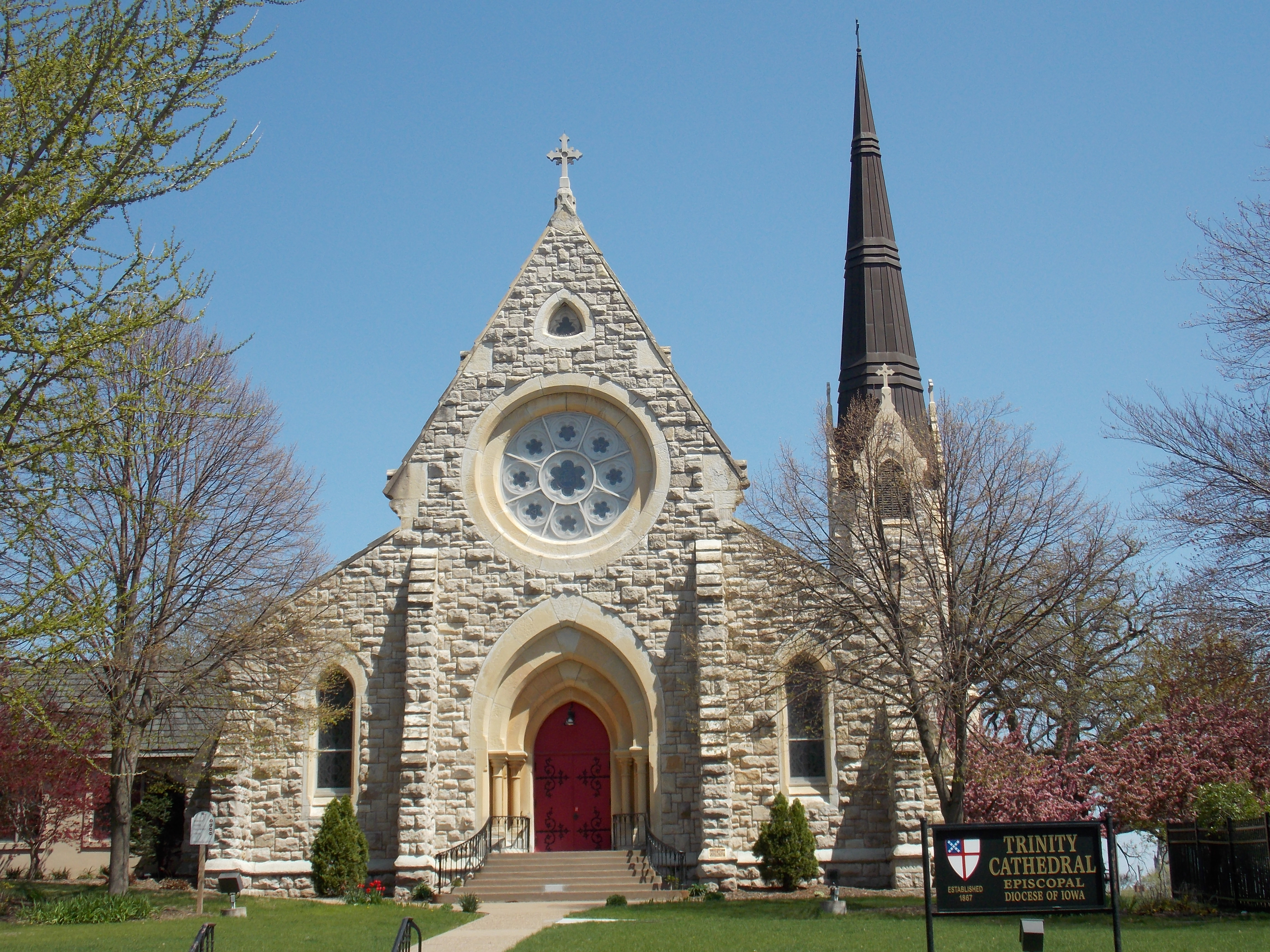
- Trinity Cathedral in 2015
- Trinity Episcopal Cathedral
- 41°31′52.5″N 90°34′30″W
- Location: 121 W. 12th St. Davenport, Iowa
- Country: United States
- Denomination: Episcopal Church
- Website: www.qctrinity.org

History
- Former name: Grace Cathedral
- Status: Cathedral/parish church
- Founded: 1841 (Trinity Parish); 1872 (Cathedral Church)
- Dedication: Holy Trinity
- Consecrated: June 18, 1873

Architecture
- Functional status: Active
- Architect: Edward Tuckerman Potter
- Style: Gothic Revival
- Years built: 1867–1873

Specifications
- Length: 135 feet (41 m)
- Width: 82 feet (25 m)
- Materials: Iowa limestone

Administration
- Diocese: Iowa

Clergy
- Bishop: The Right Rev. Betsey Monnot
- Dean: The Very Rev. Brandon Haynes
- Trinity Episcopal Cathedral
- U.S. National Register of Historic Places
- U.S. Historic district – Contributing property
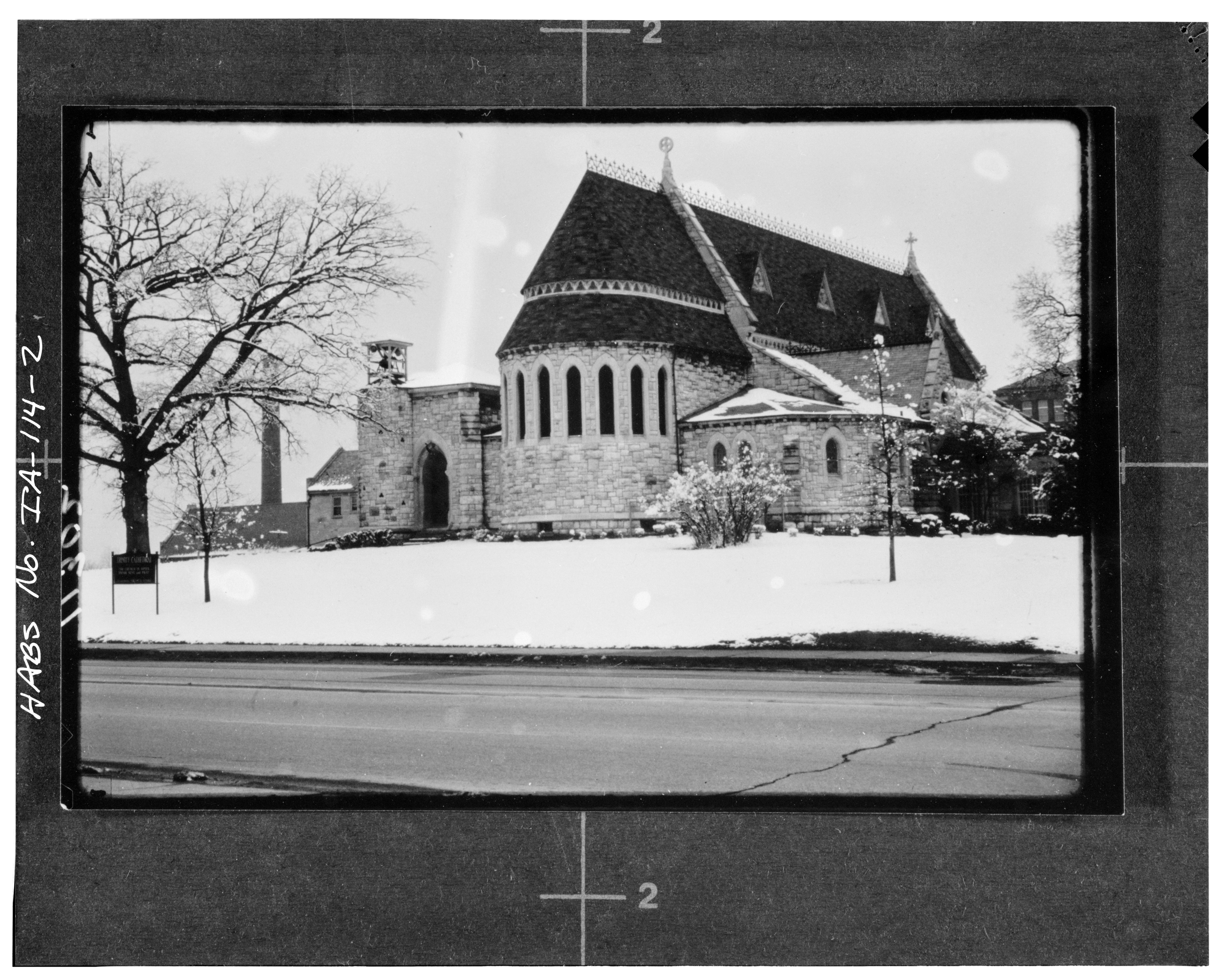
- c. 1932 Historic American Buildings Survey photo showing back of the church
- Area: 5 acres (2.0 ha)
- Part of: College Square Historic District (ID83003628)
- NRHP reference No.: 74000811

Significant dates
- Designated NRHP: December 24, 1974
- Designated CP: November 18, 1983

Trinity Episcopal Cathedral, formerly known as Grace Cathedral, is the historic cathedral in the Diocese of Iowa. The cathedral is located on the bluff overlooking Downtown Davenport, Iowa, United States. Completed in 1873, Trinity is one of the oldest cathedrals in the Episcopal Church in the United States. It was individually listed on the National Register of Historic Places in 1974. In 1983 the cathedral was included as a contributing property in the College Square Historic District, which is also listed on the National Register.

The cathedral reported 607 members in 2019 and 291 members in 2025. Plate and pledge income reported for the congregation in 2025 was $276,312. Average Sunday attendance (ASA) in 2025 was 77 persons, down from a reported 148 in 2015.

== History ==
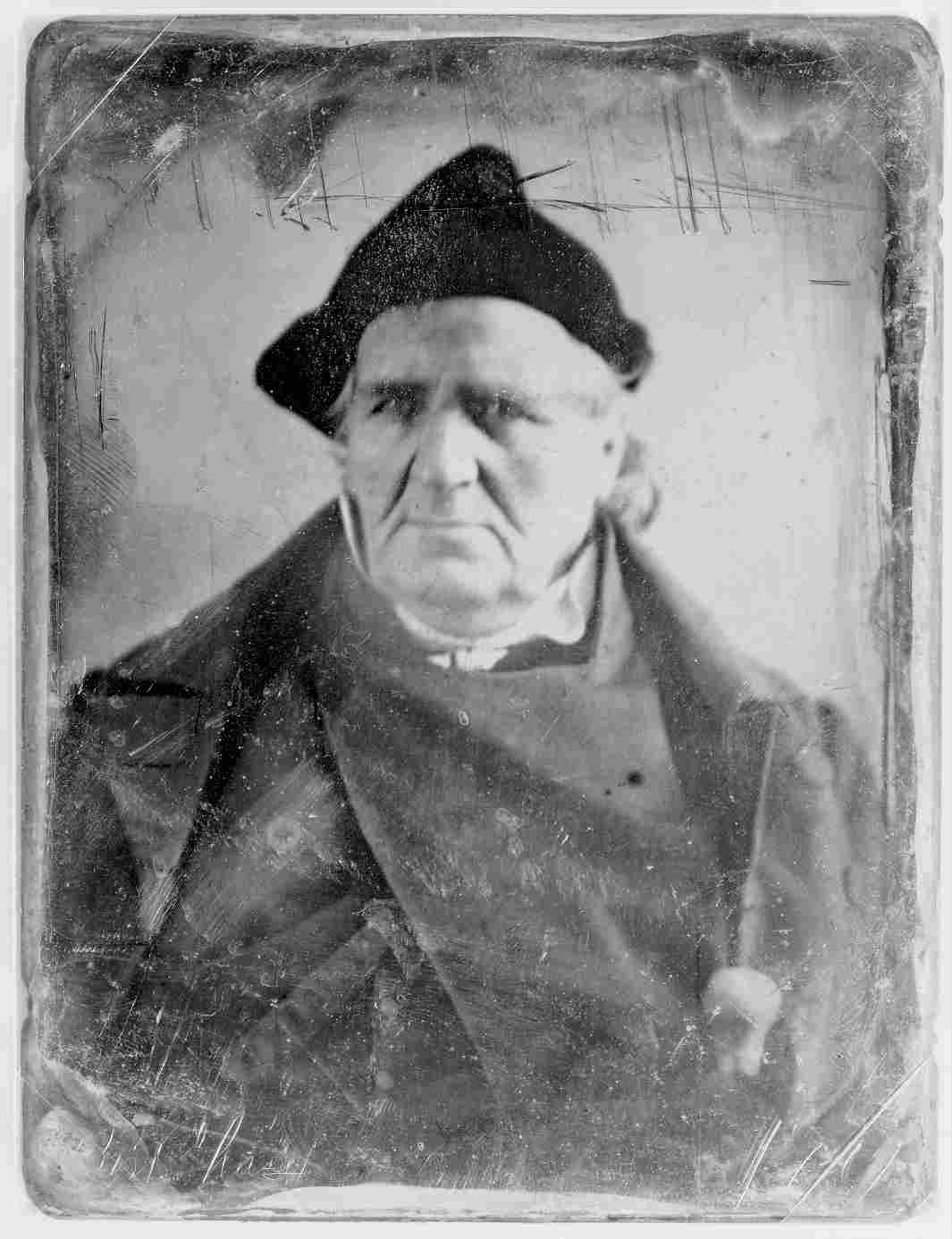
Philander Chase

=== Development of the Episcopal Church in Davenport ===
The Episcopal Church can trace its beginnings in Scott County to services held in 1837 by the Rt. Rev. Philander Chase, Bishop of Illinois. The services were held in the hotel at Rockingham, which is now the southwest section of Davenport. In 1841 the Rev. Zachariah Goldsmith of Virginia was appointed missionary to Davenport by the Domestic Committee of the Board of Missions of the Protestant Episcopal Church in the United States. On October 14, 1841, Trinity Church was organized in Davenport. The congregation originally worshiped in the home of Dr. John Emerson on Second Street. He owned the slave Dred Scott, who lived with him in Davenport. A small frame church was built on the corner of Fourth and Main streets. In 1853 the congregation erected a stone building at the corner of Fifth and Rock Island (now Pershing) streets. The building was built in the Gothic style and included a rose window. It is the first church in Iowa to have a pipe organ.

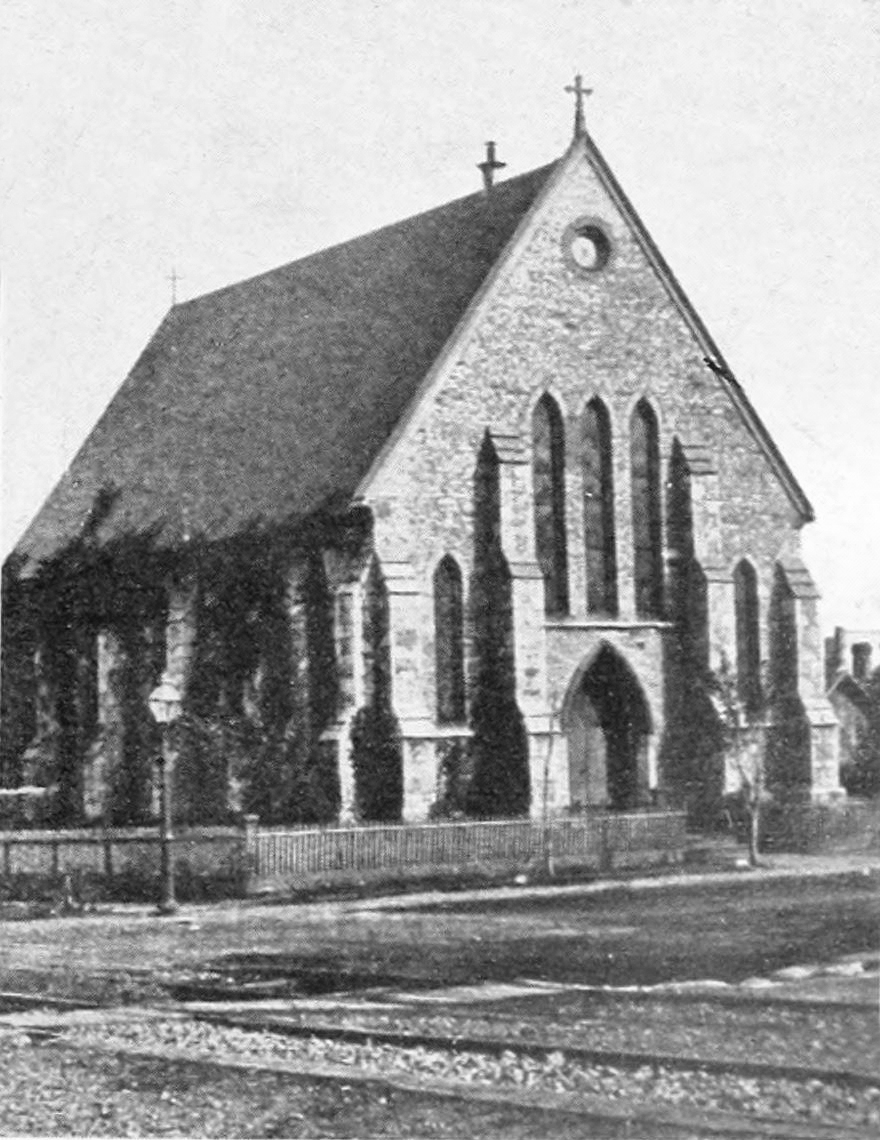
Trinity Church at Fifth and Rock Island streets

=== Diocese of Iowa ===
The Rt. Rev. Jackson Kemper, the missionary bishop of the Northwest, invited the clergy and representatives of the congregations of the state of Iowa to a meeting on August 17, 1853, at Trinity Church in Muscatine. In the absence of the bishop, the Rev. Alfred Louderbeck of Trinity Church in Davenport was elected the chairman. At this gathering, the constitutions and canons for the new Diocese of Iowa were adopted, and plans were made for the election of a bishop. The General Convention of the Protestant Episcopal Church in the United States of America admitted the Diocese of Iowa to its membership on October 7–8, 1853.

On May 31, 1854, the first convention of the Diocese of Iowa began at Trinity Church in Davenport. During the convention, the Rev. Henry Washington Lee, rector of St. Luke's Church in Rochester, New York, was elected bishop. He was consecrated on October 18, 1854, in his church in Rochester.

Through the generosity of people from the eastern United States, Bishop Lee purchased land as an investment for the new diocese. From the sale of this property a bishop's residence was built, and the diocese also had an endowment of $53,000. On June 29, 1859, the bishop purchased the former Iowa College property in Davenport for $36,000. The school had moved to Grinnell, Iowa and was renamed Grinnell College. Bishop Lee opened Griswold College on the site. The school was named for Bishop Alexander Viets Griswold of Massachusetts. The college closed in the late 19th century.

=== Grace Cathedral ===
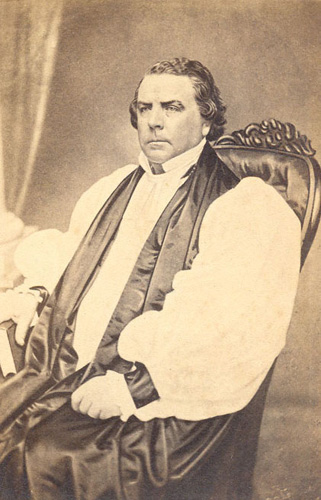
Henry Washington Lee

When Bishop Lee arrived in Davenport, he found that several people had left Trinity Church and wanted to create a new parish. He gave his permission, and they formed St. Luke's Church. They initially worshiped in the former First Baptist Church on Brady Street between Third and Fourth streets. The Rev. George W. Watson was named the rector. He was followed by the Rev. Horatio Powers. The congregation built a new church on the northwest corner of Brady and Seventh streets. However, because of financial difficulties, they had to sell the property to First Presbyterian Church. The building eventually became the Academy of Sciences, a forerunner of the Putnam Museum. A chapel was constructed on the corner of Main and 12th streets on the Griswold College property where the congregation worshiped until June 18, 1873, when it became the nucleus for the new bishop's church.

Bishop's churches, or cathedrals, were not commonplace in the Episcopal Church of the United States at the time. The Cathedral of St. Peter and St. Paul in Chicago was the first Episcopal cathedral in the country. It had not been built as a cathedral, however. The diocese acquired the Church of the Atonement in 1861, which was deep in debt and about to default, and it was renamed. The Cathedral of Our Merciful Saviour in Faribault, Minnesota, which had been consecrated in 1869 by Bishop Kemper, was the first church built as a cathedral.

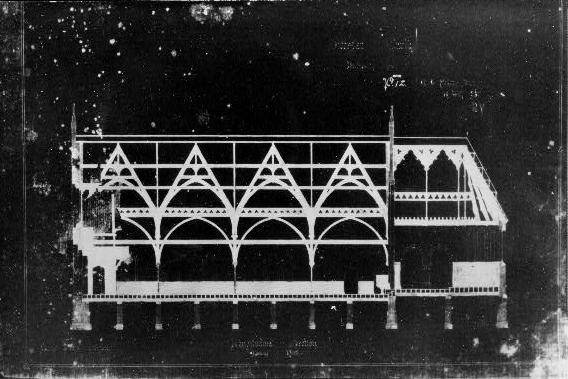
One of the original blueprints of the cathedral

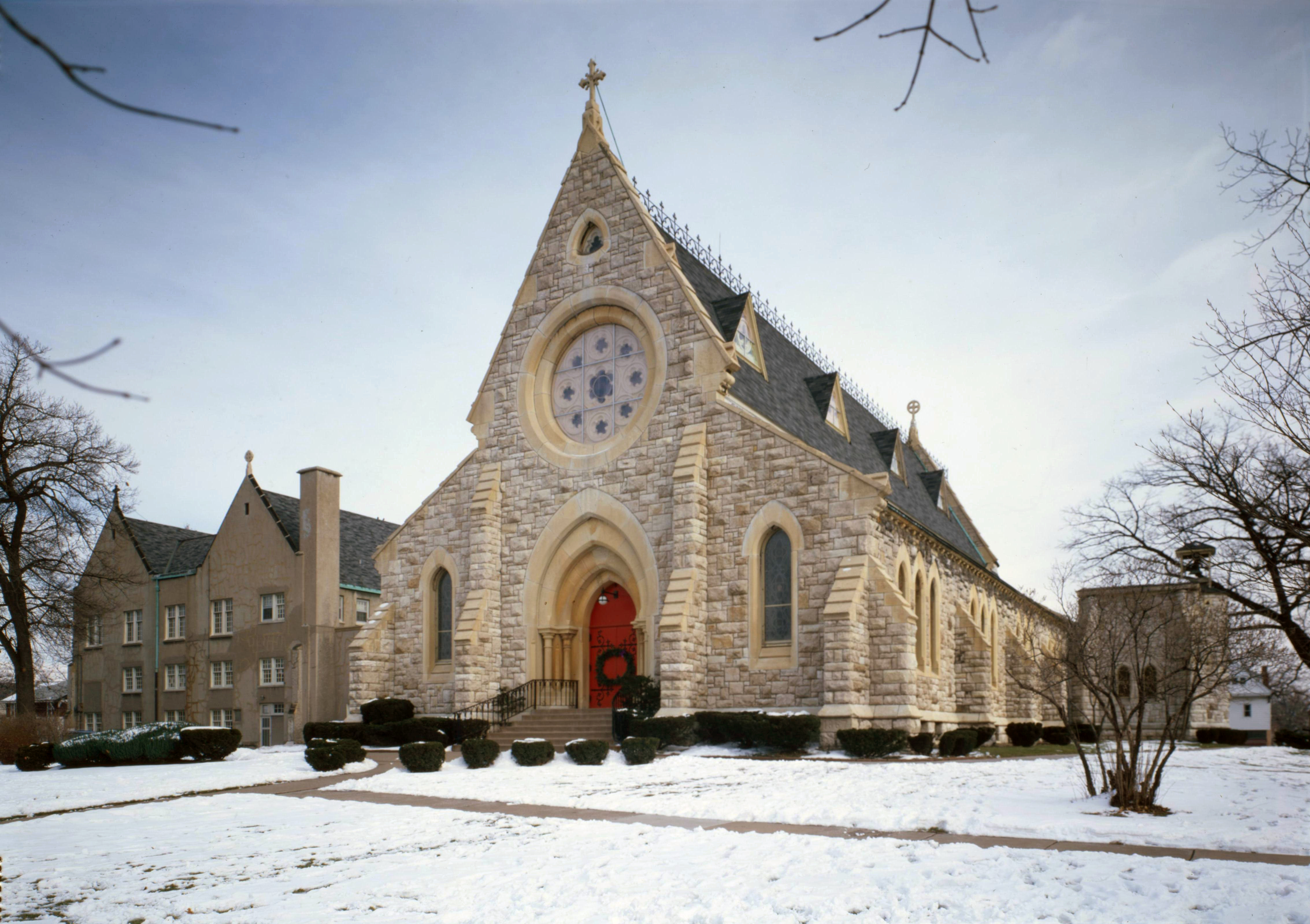
The cathedral prior to the completion of the tower and spire. The old parish house is on the left.

Bishop Lee began planning for the bishop's church after he received a gift of $30,000 from David J. Ely of Chicago in memory of his daughter, Sarah Ely Parsons, for the expressed purpose of building a cathedral. Edward Tuckerman Potter of New York City was chosen as the architect. He was the son of the Rt. Rev. Alonzo Potter who had been the Bishop of Pennsylvania, and one of his brothers, Henry C. Potter, was a priest and later bishop in New York. The cathedral was designed in the English Gothic style. The cornerstone for the new cathedral was laid on June 17, 1867, on the Griswold College property. The building was completed in 1873 according to 14 architectural drawings, but without the planned bell tower and spire.

The Diocesan Convention of 1872 recommended that the structure should be a cathedral church. It was named Grace Cathedral after Grace Church in New York because a significant amount of the money that was raised to build the cathedral came from this one parish. David J. Wolfe and his daughter Catherine Lorillard Wolfe from another New York parish were also major contributors. The church was built for $80,000, of which 10% of the money was contributed from people in Iowa. The financial panics of the 1870s affected donations for the building project. Bishop Lee contributed nearly $15,000 of his own money to finish construction and furnish the church. The cathedral was consecrated on June 18, 1873, by Bishop Lee. He was joined by Bishops Robert Clarkson of Nebraska and Henry Benjamin Whipple of Minnesota, who preached the dedicatory sermon.

Grace Cathedral was initially a bishop's church and not a parish church, although Bishop Lee had hoped that it would be so, possibly uniting with Trinity Church. The bishop was nominally in charge, and he had an Assistant in Charge to oversee the day-to-day workings of the cathedral. The following clergy fulfilled that roll: the Rev. Horatio N. Powers, 1865-1869; the Rev. Hale Townsend, 1865-1872; the Rev. R. D. Brooke, 1869-1873; the Rev. Edward Lounsbery, 1870-1874; the Rev. Joseph S. Jenckes, 1875-1877. The Rt. Rev. William Stevens Perry, Lee's successor as Bishop of Iowa, implemented the cathedral organization on April 1, 1877. Bishop Perry appointed a dean and chapter based on the English model. The chapter was made up of the following officials: praecentor, chancellor, treasurer, canons, rural deans, and honorary prebends. Not all of these offices were functional, not all of them were filled all the time, and the dean actually functioned as a parish vicar. The Very Rev. Dr. Willis H. Barris was appointed as the cathedral's first dean, and the Rev. Joseph S. Jenches, Jr., was appointed the first canon. The Rev. Charles R. Hale replaced Dean Barris in 1886. Hale was elected assistant bishop of Springfield, Illinois, and he was succeeded by the Rev. Hamilton Schuyler in 1896.

The Rt. Rev. Theodore Nevin Morrison was consecrated as the third bishop of Iowa on February 22, 1899. The cathedral organization was allowed to lapse that same year, and in September the congregation was organized as Grace Cathedral parish. The Rev. Nassau S. Stephens was called as rector, and he took charge on October 1, 1899. He was replaced by the Rev. W. W. Love in 1905, and the Rev. Dr. Marmaduke Hare replaced him three years later. Hare was conferred with the honorary title of dean by Bishop Morrison.

=== Architecture ===
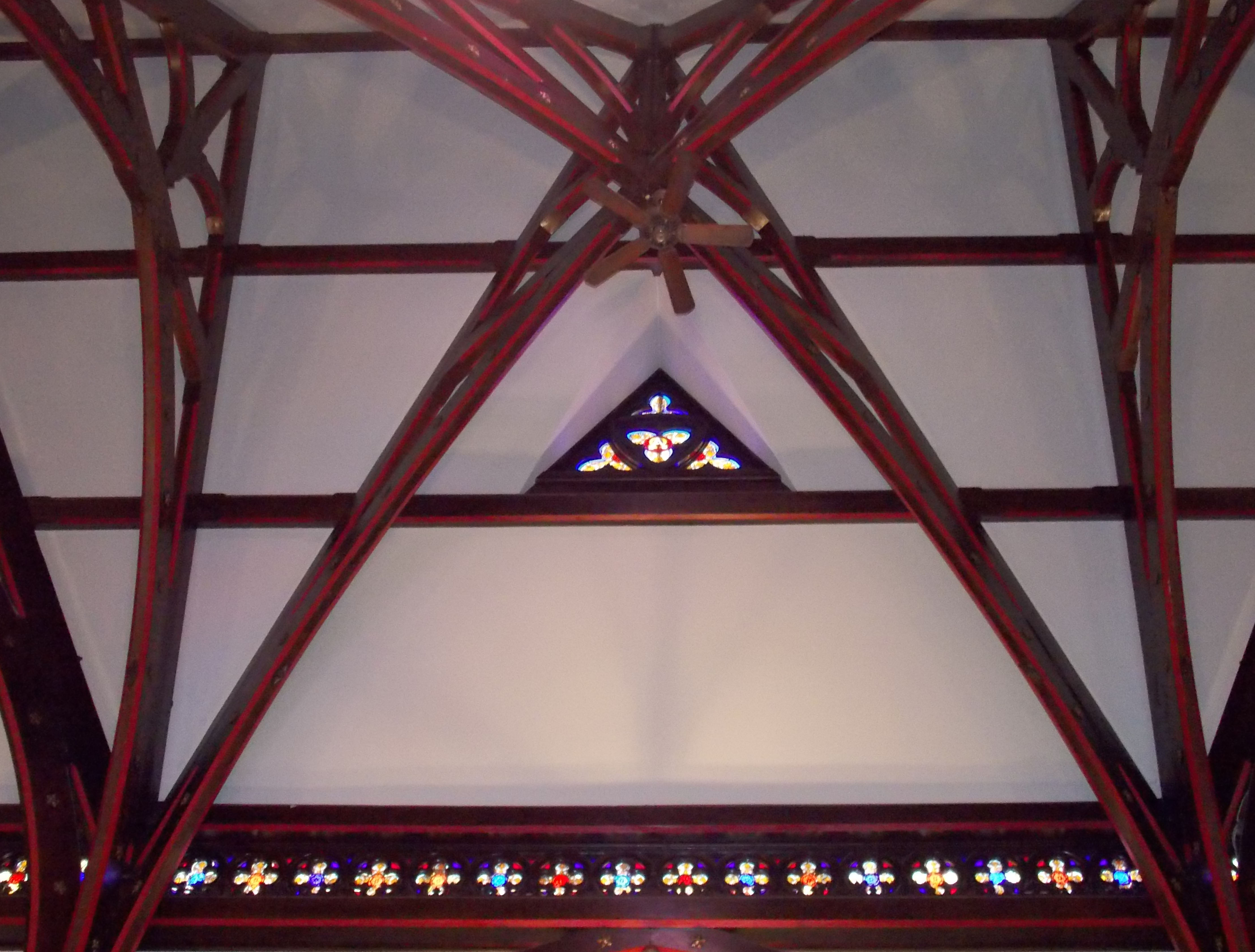
Nave ceiling showing the dormer and clerestory windows

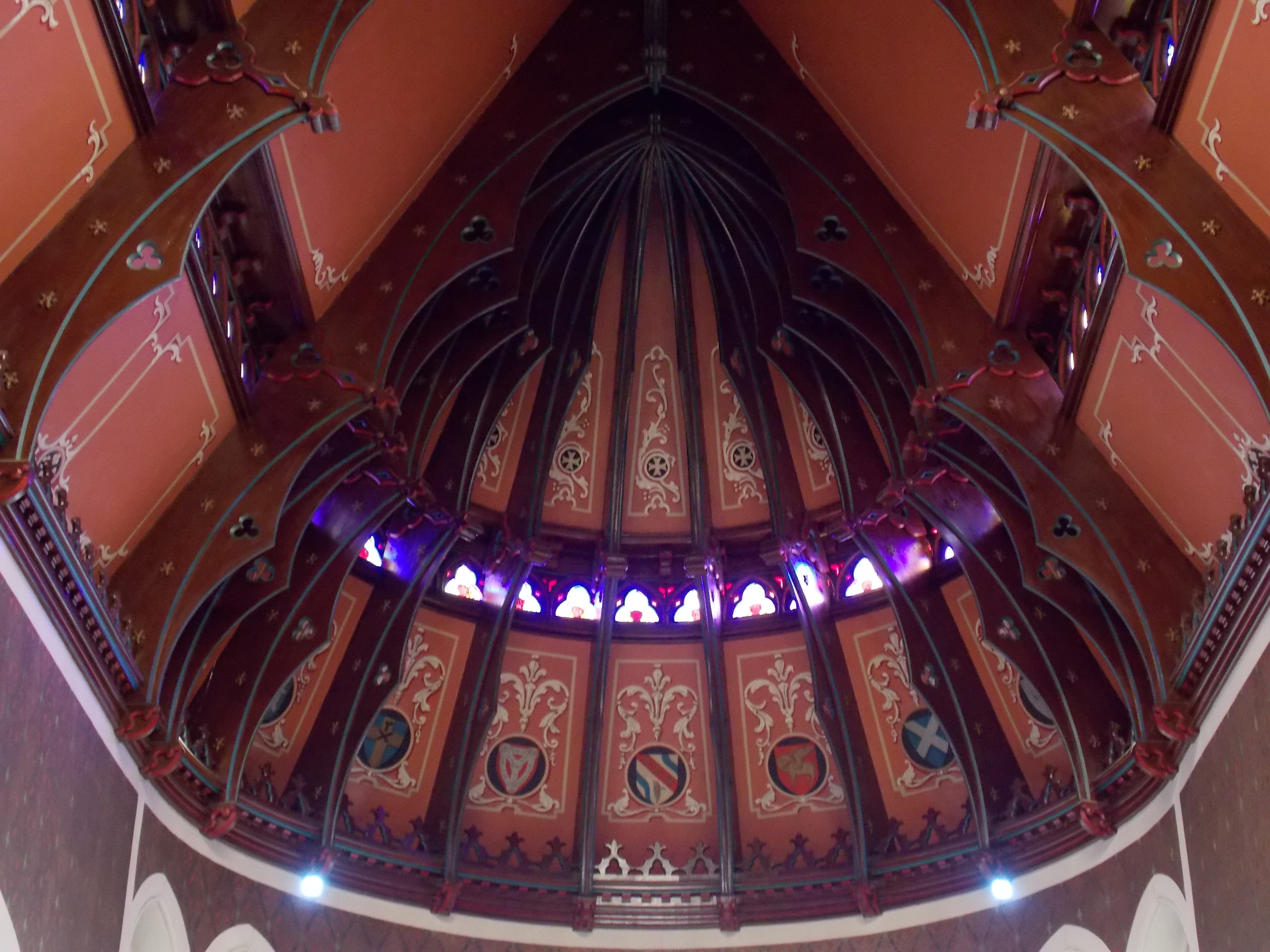
Chancel and apse ceiling

The cathedral is constructed of native Iowa limestone, trimmed in Indiana limestone. It measures 135 by 82 feet (41 by 25 m). It is a basilica-plan church with a rounded apse on its east side. There is a small vestry on the north side and a small vestibule on the west side. The structure is four bays long, and its main façade is three bays wide. Each of the side bays is divided by buttresses that frame three attached lancet windows. They are also denoted on the steep pitched gabled roof by a single dormer. The roof itself is divided into two pitches with an uninterrupted band of clerestory widows, which are 1 foot (30 cm) high. The roofline is adorned by wrought iron Gothic ornamentation between two stone crosses. The main entrance is framed by compound lancet arches below a rose window.

The interior features wooden beams that form an intricate complex of transverse and rib vaulting. They resemble medieval roof timbering. Trimmed in vermillion, the beams are fastened together by gold star-shaped bolts. The main nave is divided from the side naves by cast iron columns that are connected by wooden arches in the same style as the ceiling beams. The chancel and apse ceiling is painted in terra-cotta and features stenciling in gold leaf. The rest of the cathedral's décor is rather plain with white plastered walls above dark wood wainscoting. Butternut was used for all the interior woodwork. The ceiling, which is now painted white, was originally painted ultramarine. Nineteenth-century stained glass windows illuminate the interior of the church, including the nine lancet windows in the apse. The Stations of the Cross on the side walls are later additions. The rose window commemorates Bishop Kemper.

=== Episcopalian institutions ===
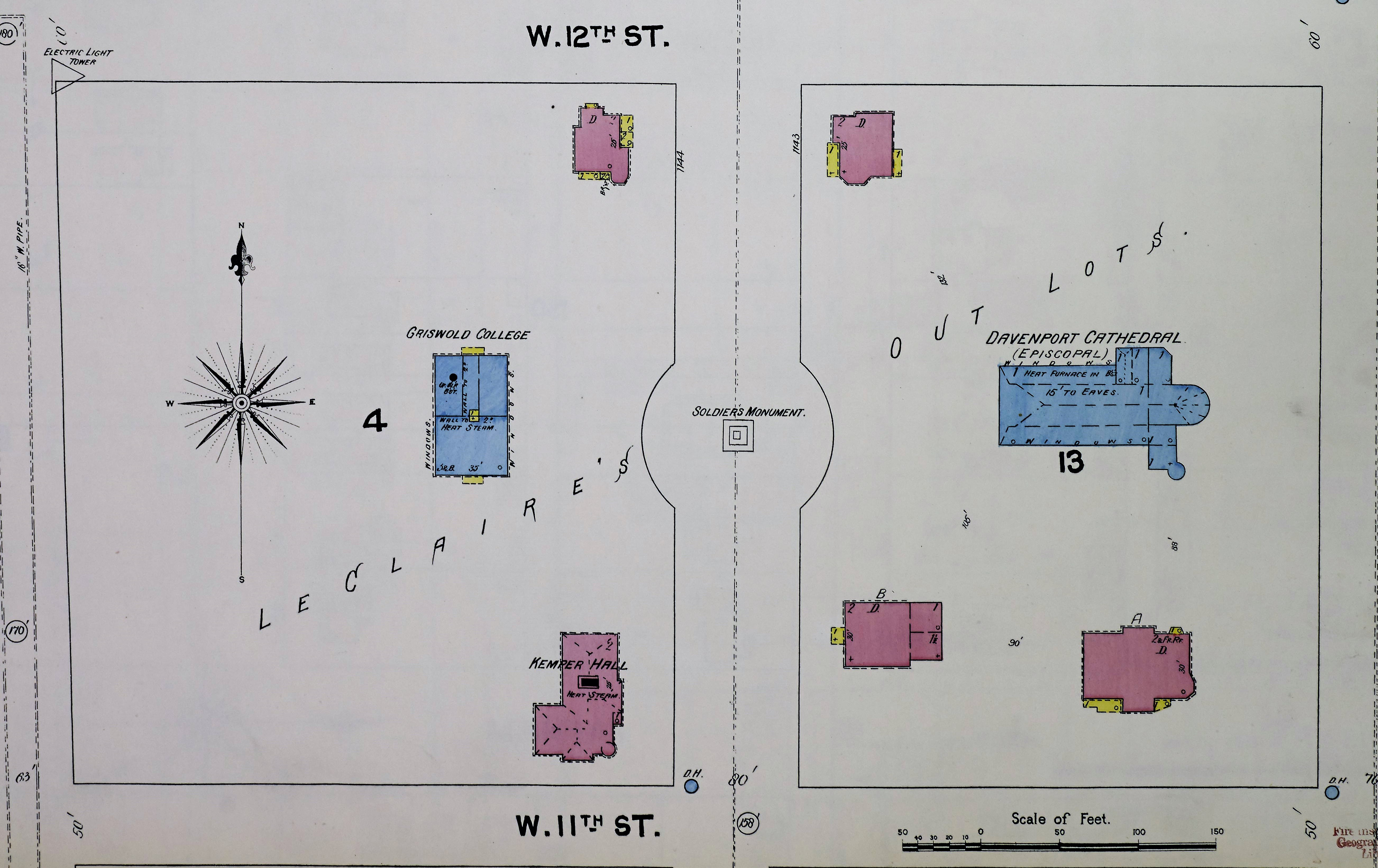
1892 Sanborn fire insurance map of the Griswold College and Grace Cathedral campuses. Kemper Hall is the first building on the left on the bottom of the map. The bishop's residence is directly below the cathedral on the right.

The Episcopal Church established other institutions in Davenport in the late 19th century that served the community into the 21st century, even though none of the institutions are supported by the church today. Bishop Perry announced plans for a girls' school in 1883. The residence of Mrs. John L. Davies, which was named Cambria Place, was chosen as the location for the new school. On September 24, 1884, St. Katherine's Hall opened to both day and boarding students. In 1902 the Sisters of Mary took over the administration and teaching responsibilities at the school. In the years following, the school expanded with the addition of a chapel and academic buildings. The Renwick mansion was added to the facility in 1907. In 1968 the school ended its boarding program and admitted boys. The name was changed to St. Katherine and St. Mark to reflect this change. In 1973, the school moved to the former home of Joseph Bettendorf in Bettendorf, Iowa, and in 1980 it amicably broke its ties with the Episcopal Church. In 2001, the school changed its name to Rivermont Collegiate.

In 1884 the trustees of Griswold College began planning a school for boys. They built a structure opposite the cathedral on Main Street, and it opened in September 1886 as Kemper Hall, named for the missionary bishop. It closed for lack of funds in December 1895. The building was sold to the public school district, and it remains on the Central High School campus.

In 1893 St. Luke's Hospital was founded at the corner of Eighth and Main streets in Davenport and moved to its Rusholme Street location in 1914. In 1993, one hundred years after its founding, a merger was announced between St. Luke's and Mercy Hospital in Davenport, and the consolidated hospital opened in 1994 as Genesis Health System.

=== Trinity Cathedral ===

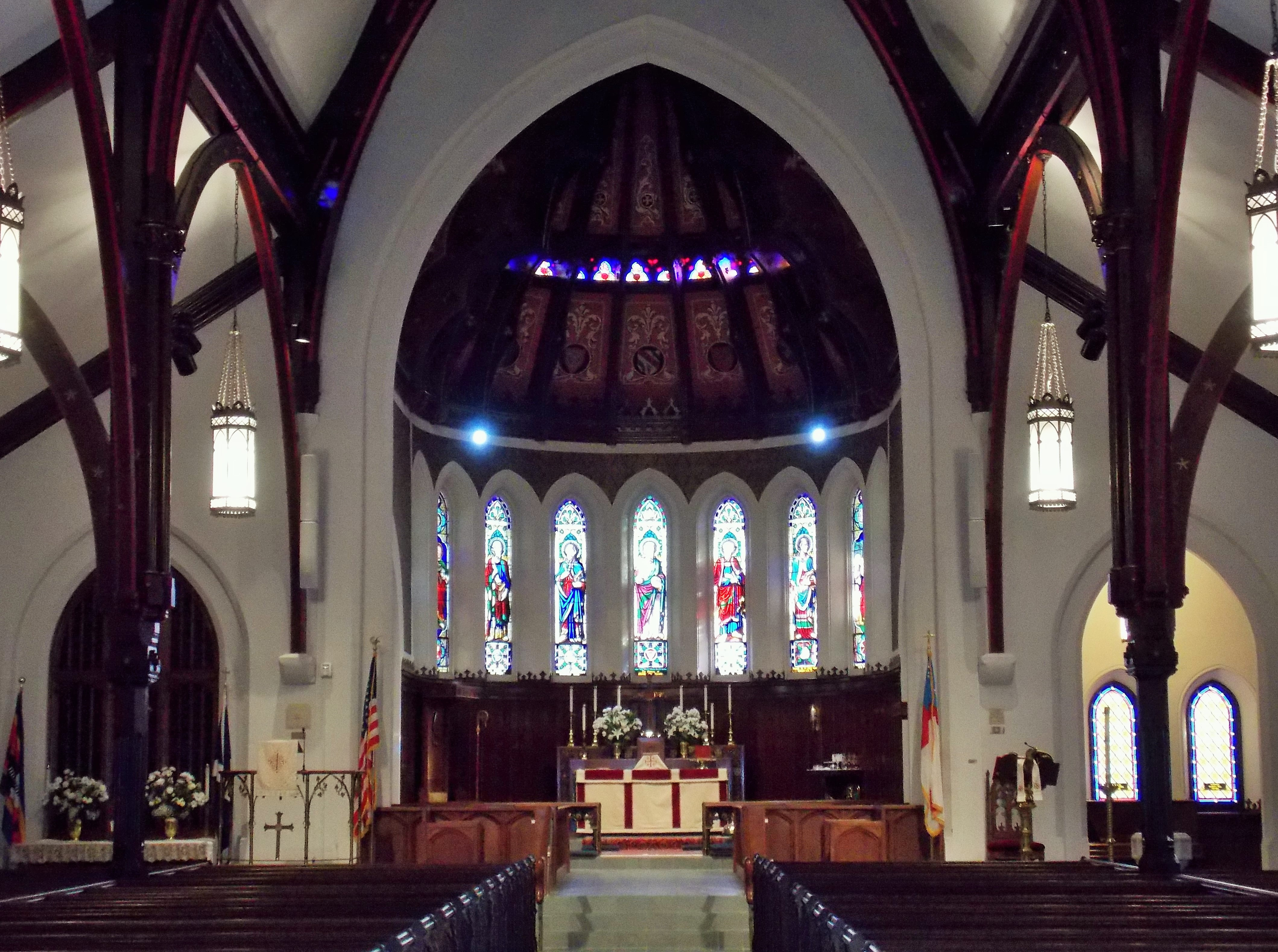
Interior of Trinity Cathedral

Trinity Church moved to a new stone building on the southwest corner of Brady and Seventh streets because its old church had been destroyed in a fire in 1874. The new building, like the old, was a stone structure in the Gothic Revival style. It was designed by Davenport architect Edward Hammatt, who designed Kemper Hall and another building on the Griswold College campus around the same time. It was built through the generosity of Clarissa Cook, an early benefactor to charitable organizations in Davenport and the Episcopal Church. She built the new church in memory of her husband, Ebenezer Cook, who had served on the vestry at Trinity for 30 years.

In the first decade of the 20th century, it had become apparent that a merger between Grace Cathedral and Trinity Church was necessary. On Christmas Day 1909 both congregations worshiped in Trinity Church and on the following day, which was a Sunday, they worshiped together in the cathedral. In 1910 the corporation of Trinity Church was maintained, and the cathedral was renamed.

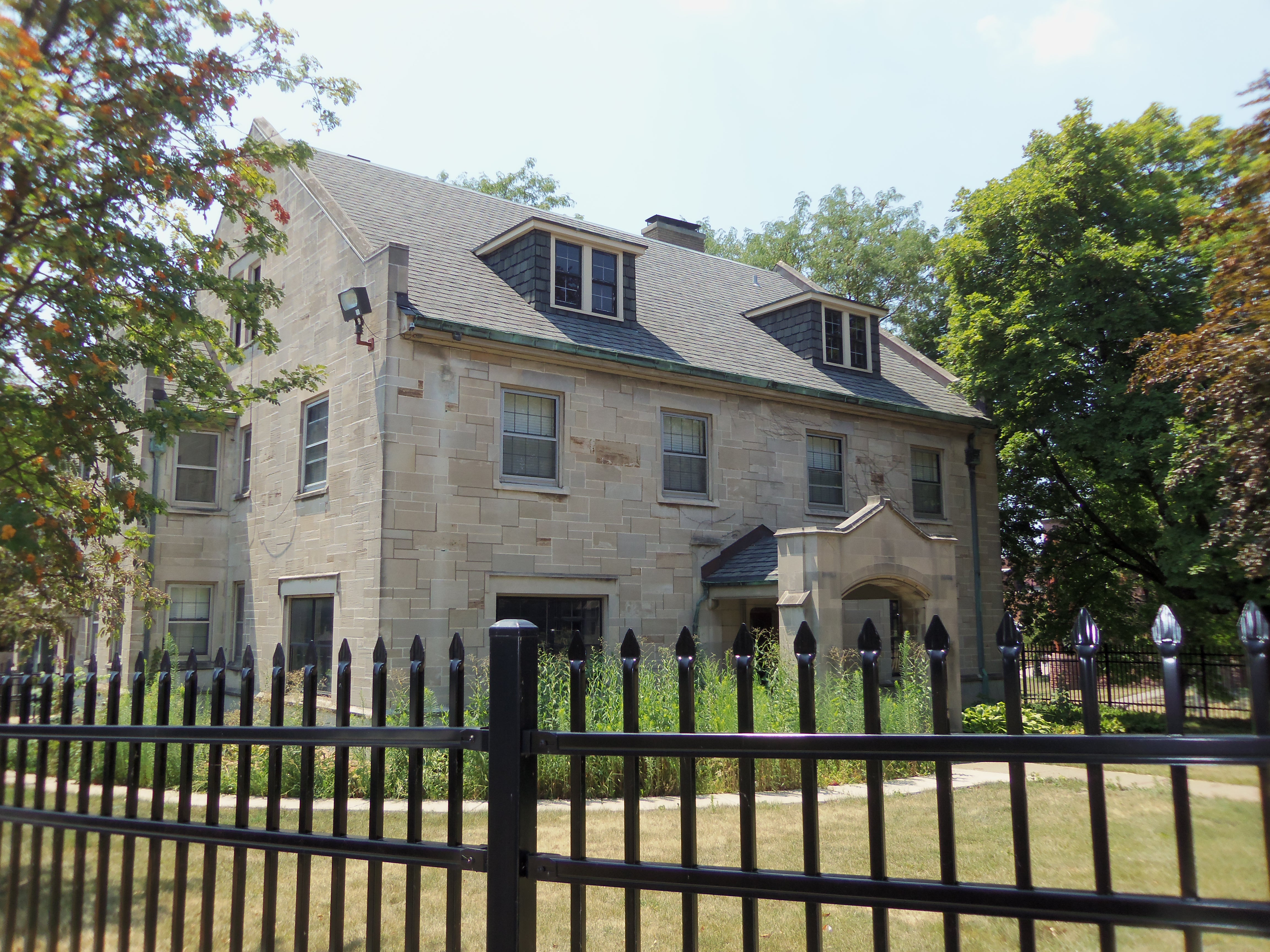
The dean's house

In 1915 the present dean's house was constructed to the southwest of the cathedral. It replaced Lee Hall, which was built on this site in 1865 as a home for Bishop Lee. It was used in later years as the dean's house. The house is a 2½-story structure that features side gables with end parapets and a two-story wing in the back. It is a frame and tile structure with stone facing on the exterior. While plain in appearance, its grey-tan exterior and vaguely Tudor Gothic style is in keeping with the color scheme and architectural theme of the rest of the Trinity complex. In contrast, the building that it replaced was an Italianate structure.

Christ Church, which had been established in 1864, had a small frame church building at the corner of Third and Pine streets in the west end. It merged with Trinity Cathedral in 1928.

Several changes occurred in the second half of the twentieth century. The 1960s saw changes for the Trinity congregation with the establishment of two new churches in the Iowa Quad Cities. St. Alban's Church was organized in 1960 in northwest Davenport, and in 1966 St. Peter's Church was established in Bettendorf. In 1979 the Wolff & Associés pipe organ, opus 22, was installed in the gallery of the cathedral. In 1988 Trinity's dean, the Very Rev. Edward Harding MacBurney, was elected the seventh bishop of Quincy.

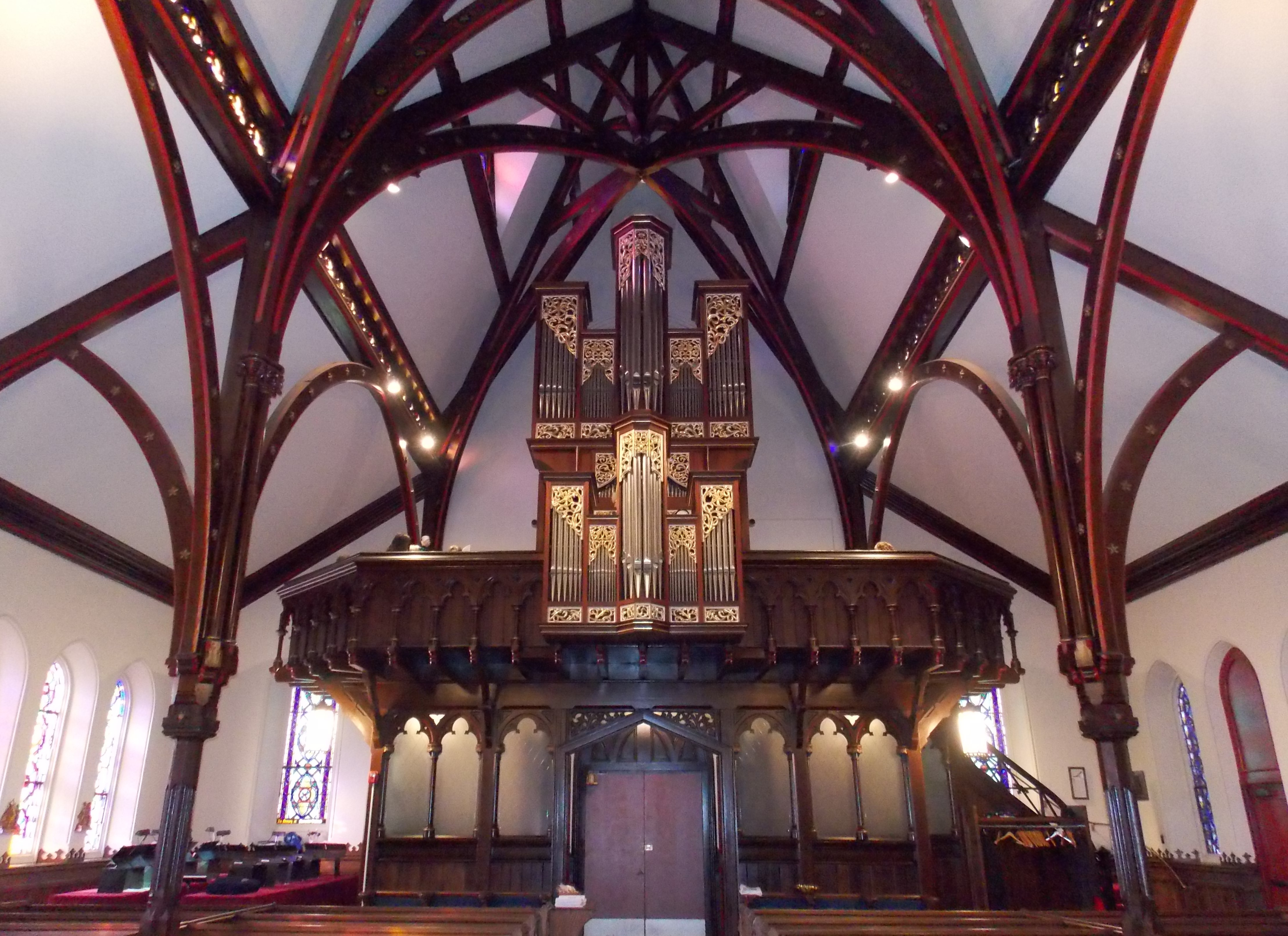
The Wolff & Associés pipe organ in the rear gallery

The status of Trinity Cathedral was changed in the 1990s. During the episcopate of the Rt. Rev. Elwood Lindsay Haines (1944–1949) the bishop's residence and the diocesan headquarters were moved to Des Moines. In 1992, when the Rt. Rev C. Christopher Epting was the bishop, the diocese announced that St. Paul's Church in Des Moines would become the liturgical cathedral for the diocese. Trinity would be maintained as the diocese's historical cathedral. In 2010 Bishop Epting, now retired, became the interim dean at Trinity.

The Clarissa C. Cook Parish House, which had been built in 1917, began to deteriorate and had to be replaced. A fund drive in the parish raised two million dollars, and the new structure was completed in 1993. The building, designed to complement the cathedral, contains a Great Hall, kitchen facilities, parish offices, classroom space, children's chapel, and a larger octagon-shaped chapel. It is connected to the cathedral by two cloister walks. In the middle is a garth, or outdoor garden. It was named the Haines Parish House after the largest donor, Elizabeth Haines.

Ms. Haines also desired to fulfill the original plans for the cathedral. In 1998 she donated all the funds necessary to complete the cathedral's bell tower and spire. The spire is half of the tower's height, and together they rise 131 feet (40 m) above the ground. Potter's original plans called for a stone spire, but one covered in metal was erected instead. One hundred and thirty-one years after the cornerstone was laid by Bishop Lee, the cathedral was completed.

== Pipe organ ==
- 1979 Wolff & Associés Organ op. 22
- 2004 Wahl rebuilt Pedal division

Stoplist:

Pedale

- 16 Contrebasse (added)
- 16 Soubasse
- 8 Montre
- 4 Prestant
- 2 Flute*
- III Fourniture
- 16 Bombarde
- 8 Trompette
- 4 Clarion
- 2 Cornet*

Grand Orgue

- 16 Bourdon
- 8 Montre
- 8 Flute a Cheminee
- 8 Viol di Gamba
- 4 Prestant
- 2 Doublette
- 2 2/3 Nazard*
- III Cornet*
- IV*/ III* Fourniture
- III Cymbale
- 8 Trompette
- 4 Clarion

Positif

- 8 Montre
- 8 Flute a Cheminee
- 8 Quintaton
- 4 Prestant
- 4 Flute a Fuseau
- 2 2-3 Quinte*
- II Sesquialtera*
- 2 Flute a Bec
- 2 Doublette*
- IV Fourniture*
- 8 Cromorne

Echo

- 8 Bourdon
- 4 Prestant
- 2 Doublette
- 1 1/3 Larigot
- II-III Cymbale
- 16 Servelas
- 8 Voix Humaine

(*) pairs indicate half hitch.

Tremblant forte (to the manuals)

Five couplers and three reversibles

== See also ==
- List of the Episcopal cathedrals of the United States
- List of cathedrals in the United States
