= Theodore N. Morrison =

American bishop (1850–1929)

The Right Reverend Theodore Nevin Morrison D.D., LL.D.
- Bishop of Iowa
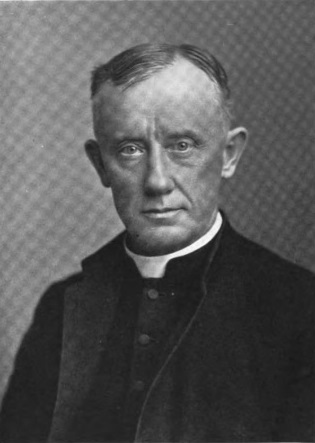
- Church: Episcopal Church
- Diocese: Iowa
- Elected: November 30, 1898
- In office: 1899–1929
- Predecessor: William Stevens Perry
- Successor: Harry Sherman Longley

Orders
- Ordination: February 19, 1876 by William Edward McLaren
- Consecration: February 22, 1899 by William Edward McLaren

Personal details
- Born: February 18, 1850 Ottawa, Illinois, United States
- Died: December 27, 1929 (aged 79) Davenport, Iowa, United States
- Buried: Pine Hill Cemetery
- Denomination: Anglican
- Parents: Theodore Nevin Morrison & Ann Eliza Howland
- Spouse: Sarah Buck Swazey (m. 1879; died 1913)
- Children: 4

Theodore Nevin Morrison (February 18, 1850 – December 27, 1929) was a 20th-century bishop in the Protestant Episcopal Church in the United States of America. He was Bishop of Iowa from 1898 to 1929.

== Biography ==
=== Early life and ministry ===
Theodore Morrison was born in Ottawa, Illinois on February 18, 1850, to the Rev. Theodore Nevin Morrison Sr. and Anna Eliza (Howland) Morrison. He received a bachelor's degree in 1870 from Illinois College at Jacksonville, and studied for the priesthood at General Theological Seminary in New York City. He was made a Doctor of Divinity by Illinois College in 1895, and a Doctor of Sacred Theology by Western Theological Seminary in 1905.

Morrison was ordained a deacon in July 1873 and served his first charge in Pekin, Illinois. He was ordained a priest on February 19, 1876, and served as rector of the Church of the Ascension in Chicago from 1876 to 1899 when he was elected bishop. He married Sarah Buck Swazey, whose father was an Episcopal priest in Chicago, on October 28, 1879.

=== Bishop of Iowa ===
Rev. Morrison was elected the third Bishop of Iowa on November 30, 1898. He was consecrated bishop on February 22, 1899, by Bishops William Edward McLaren, George Franklin Seymour and William David Walker. He was the 190th Episcopal bishop consecrated in the United States. He served the diocese as its bishop for 30 years. Bishop Morrison was from the High Church faction within the Episcopal Church. He was quoted as saying, "I have no hesitation saying that I wish we had at the beginning taken the name of the American Catholic Church. I love the word Catholic."

Griswold College in Davenport was declared defunct in 1900 and the school property across Main Street from the cathedral was sold to the Davenport School District for $53,000. St. Katherine's Hall in Davenport was left as the only diocesan educational institution whose administration was transferred to the Sisters of St. Mary in 1902. During this time Grace Cathedral and Trinity Church were combined to form Trinity Cathedral.

Unlike his predecessors, Bishop Morrison was willing to speak out about the social and political issues of the day. He was a strong supporter of US involvement in World War I and after the Armistice, the League of Nations. While he did not support the passage of the 18th Amendment to the US Constitution, after it became a part of the Constitution he said, "I am from now on a teetotaler and for the enforcement of the law as it stands." He, however, was opposed to the Church Temperance Society and did not want it associated with the church.

Bishop Morrison suffered from ill-health when he was bishop. In 1912 the Rev. Harry Sherman Longley was consecrated suffragan bishop and then in 1917, he was elected coadjutor bishop. The two bishops divided the work among themselves. Morrison resided in Davenport and oversaw the self-supporting parishes. Longley resided in Des Moines and oversaw the missions in the Diocese, and deferred to Morrison on official matters. They generally communicated by letter, but they appeared to have a good working relationship. When either traveled he usually did so by train. When traveling by automobile Longley drove himself while Morrison was driven. It is not known if he knew how to drive or not.

=== Later life and death ===
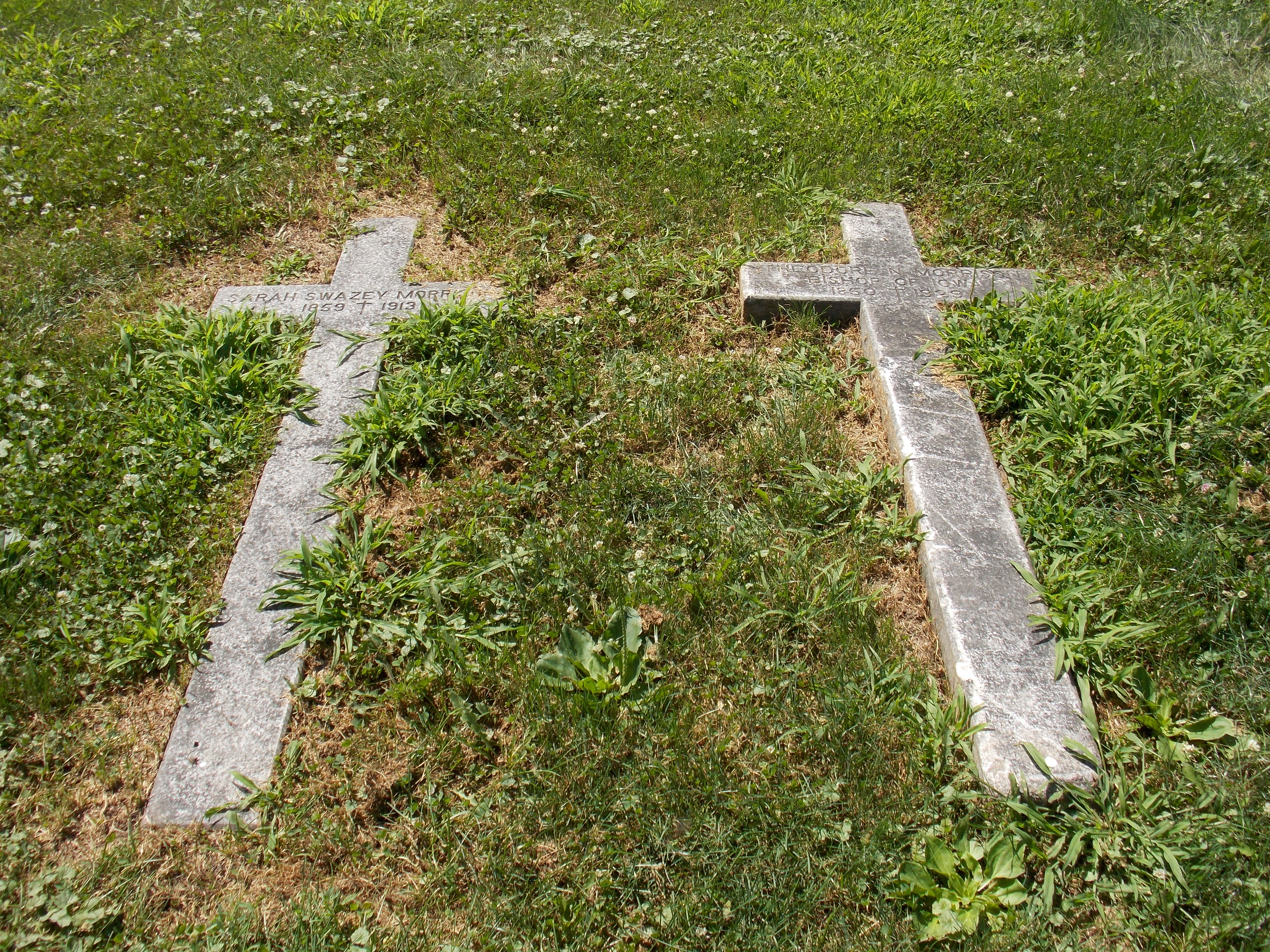
The graves of Bishop Morrison (right) and his wife Sarah

Bishop Morrison worked until the day he died. He was killed in a car accident in Davenport on December 27, 1929. His funeral was held at Trinity Cathedral and he was buried in Pine Hill Cemetery in Davenport.
