= First Presbyterian Church (Davenport, Iowa) =

- U.S. National Register of Historic Places
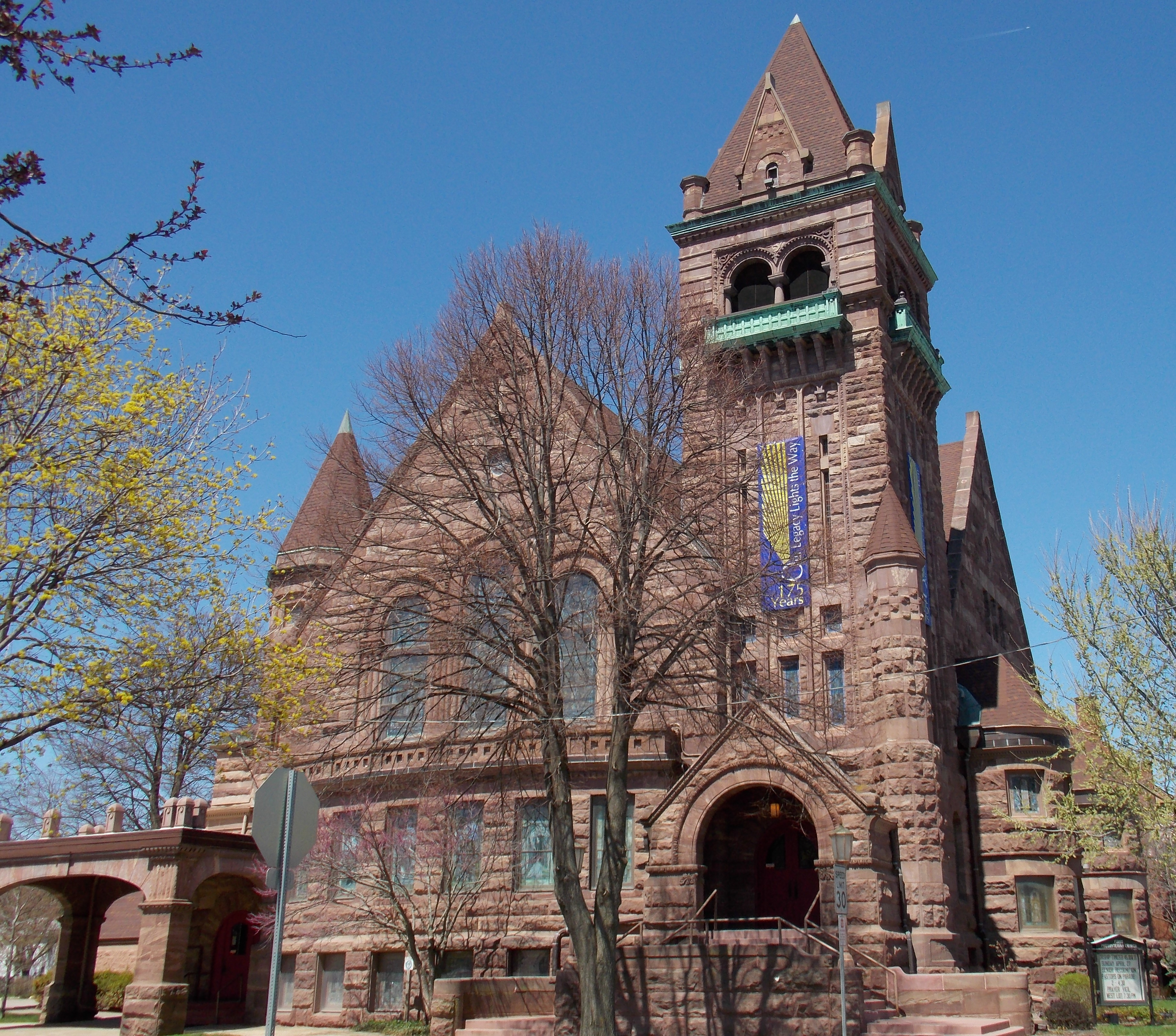
- First Presbyterian in 2014

- Location within Iowa Location within the United States
- Location: 1702 Iowa St. Davenport, Iowa
- Coordinates: 41°32′11″N 90°34′12″W
- Area: less than one acre
- Architect: Gottschalk & Beadle
- Architectural style: Romanesque
- MPS: Davenport MRA
- NRHP reference No.: 83002431
- Added to NRHP: July 7, 1983

First Presbyterian Church is located in central Davenport, Iowa, United States. It was listed on the National Register of Historic Places in 1983. The congregation is associated with the Presbyterian Church (USA).

== History ==
=== Development ===
When the city of Davenport was formed in 1836 there were between 10 and 12 people who were Presbyterian. In the first couple of years they worshiped with other Protestant congregations. In April 1838, they formed their own congregation. They gathered in a small building owned by T.S. Hoge on Ripley Street between Front (present-day River Drive) and Second Streets. They managed the best they could with supply ministers who visited from time to time. The group was organized into a church on May 5, 1839, in a small frame schoolhouse on the corner of Fourth and Harrison Streets. The clergy in attendance at the service that day included Rev. Ithamar Pillsbury of Macomb, Illinois, Rev. M. Hummer of Stephenson (present-day Rock Island, Illinois), and the Rev. Enoch Mead of Rockingham, Iowa, which is now the southwest section of Davenport. They were also the supply clergy who occasionally visited the congregation. In 1842, J.M.D. Burrows and T.S. Hoge were chosen and ordained elders of the church.

Rev. Samuel Cleland had charge of the Davenport and Stephenson congregations for four years starting in 1843. At this time, they built their first church in Davenport, even though the congregation was still very small. In 1846, the congregation only numbered 17. From 1847 to 1849, the congregation was irregularly served by a pastor. Stability for the congregation came in November 1849 when the Rev. J.D. Mason became the pastor. At this time, the church consisted of about 30 members. By 1857, the congregation had grown to 200.

The congregation built another church building in 1853 on Third Street between Harrison and Main Streets. In 1864, they sold that property and purchased the former St. Luke's Episcopal Church on Brady Street. This building served the congregation for over thirty years, until the decision was made to build a new church closer to the center of the parish. The ground was broken for the new church at the corner of Kirkwood Boulevard and Iowa Street on March 18, 1898. The church's cornerstone was laid on July 20 of the same year, and the new church was dedicated on December 17, 1899. The old church became the Academy of Sciences, a forerunner of the Putnam Museum

=== Present Church ===
The new church was designed by the Galesburg, Illinois architectural firm of Gottschalk & Beadle. They were the same firm that designed an almost identical Central Congregational Church in Galesburg. The building is constructed of Marquette brownstone, and it has a magnesian stain. The architectural style is Romanesque with a tower in the Richardsonian style. There are carved oak leaves and foliage on the gables in the Renaissance style. The interior is octagonal, and the ceiling is marked with a Maltese cross and a Greek cross. The stained glass windows were created by the J&R Lamb Studios of New York City.

The congregation continued to grow and by 1935 it numbered 1,300 people and was one of the largest congregations in the city.

== Pipe organ ==
The Casavant Frères Ltée (1999, Op. 3455A) pipe organ is located in the front of the sanctuary with some pipes exposed. It features a traditional style console with a roll top. The organ is located in the center in a fixed position. It is equipped with four manuals, five divisions, 61 ranks; the manual compass has 61 notes, and the pedal compass has 32 notes. It has electric key action and electric stop action. The drawknobs are in vertical rows on angled jambs. There are balanced swell shoes/pedals in standard AGO placement. The combination action is a computerized/digital system. Rounding out the features are AGO Standard (concave radiating) pedalboard, crescendo pedal, reversible full organ/tutti thumb piston, reversible full organ/tutti toe stud, combination action thumb pistons, combination action toe studs, coupler reversible thumb pistons, and coupler reversible toe studs.

Stoplist:

GREAT ORGAN

- 16 Spitzflöte (ext)
- 8 Bordun (Sw)*
- 4 Oktave
- 2-2/3 Quinte
- 2 Oktave
- 1-3/5 Terz
- VI Mixtur
- 16 Trompette
- 8 Trompete
- 8 Tuba (So)*
- Tremulant
- Chimes
- MIDI*

SWELL ORGAN

- 16 Bordun (ext)
- 8 Prinzipal*
- 8 Spitzgeigen
- 8 Vox Coelestis
- 8 Bordun
- 8 Flute douce*
- 8 Flute celeste*
- 4 Oktave
- 4 Rohrflöte
- 2 Gemshorn
- IV Scharf
- 16 Klarinette
- 8 Trompete
- 4 Klarine
- Tremulant
- MIDI*

CHOIR ORGAN

- 8 Dulzflöte
- 8 Schwebung
- 8 Rohrgedackt
- 4 Traversflöte
- 2 Italienisch Prinzipal
- 1-1/3 Quinte
- II Kornett
- 8 English Horn
- 8 Tuba (So)*
- 4 Tuba Clarion (So)*
- MIDI*

SOLO ORGAN*

- 8 Montre*
- 8 Flute majeure*
- 8 Flute harmonique*
- 4 Prestant*
- II-IV Cornet*
- 8 Hautbois*
- 8 Tuba*
- 4 Tuba Clarion*

PEDAL ORGAN

- 32 Soubasse (Electronic)*
- 32 Bourdon (Electronic)*
- 16 Kontrabass
- 16 Spitzflöte (Gt)
- 16 Bordun (Sw)
- 8 Oktave
- 8 Spitzflöte (Gt)
- 8 Bordun (Sw)
- III Theorbe*
- IV Mixture
- 32 Contra Trompete (Electronic generators)*
- 16 Posaune
- 16 Trombone (Gt)
- 8 *Tuba (So)*
- 8 Trompete (ext)
- 4 Klarine (Sw)
- 4 Tuba Clarion (So)*

(*) Additions in 1988.

== Other Presbyterian congregations ==
Other congregations sprang up in the city, including First Associate Reformed Presbyterian in 1856. The congregation changed its name to United Presbyterian four years later, to McClellan Heights in 1907, and finally St. Andrew's in 1960. The congregation disbanded in 2008. Newcomb was organized by the YMCA in 1869 in the northwest part of the city. It became a mission of First Presbyterian between 1883 and 1916. Renwick Chapel was established in 1876. It had a succession of names, including College Avenue Presbyterian, Second Presbyterian, and Mt. Ida Presbyterian. It no longer exists. West Park Presbyterian was founded in the mid-20th century on the west side of the city, around the same time that Ridgeview Park Presbyterian was established in northwest Davenport. They merged in 2008 and formed New Hope.
