= Hellmuth Wolff (organ builder) =

Canadian organ builder (1937–2013)

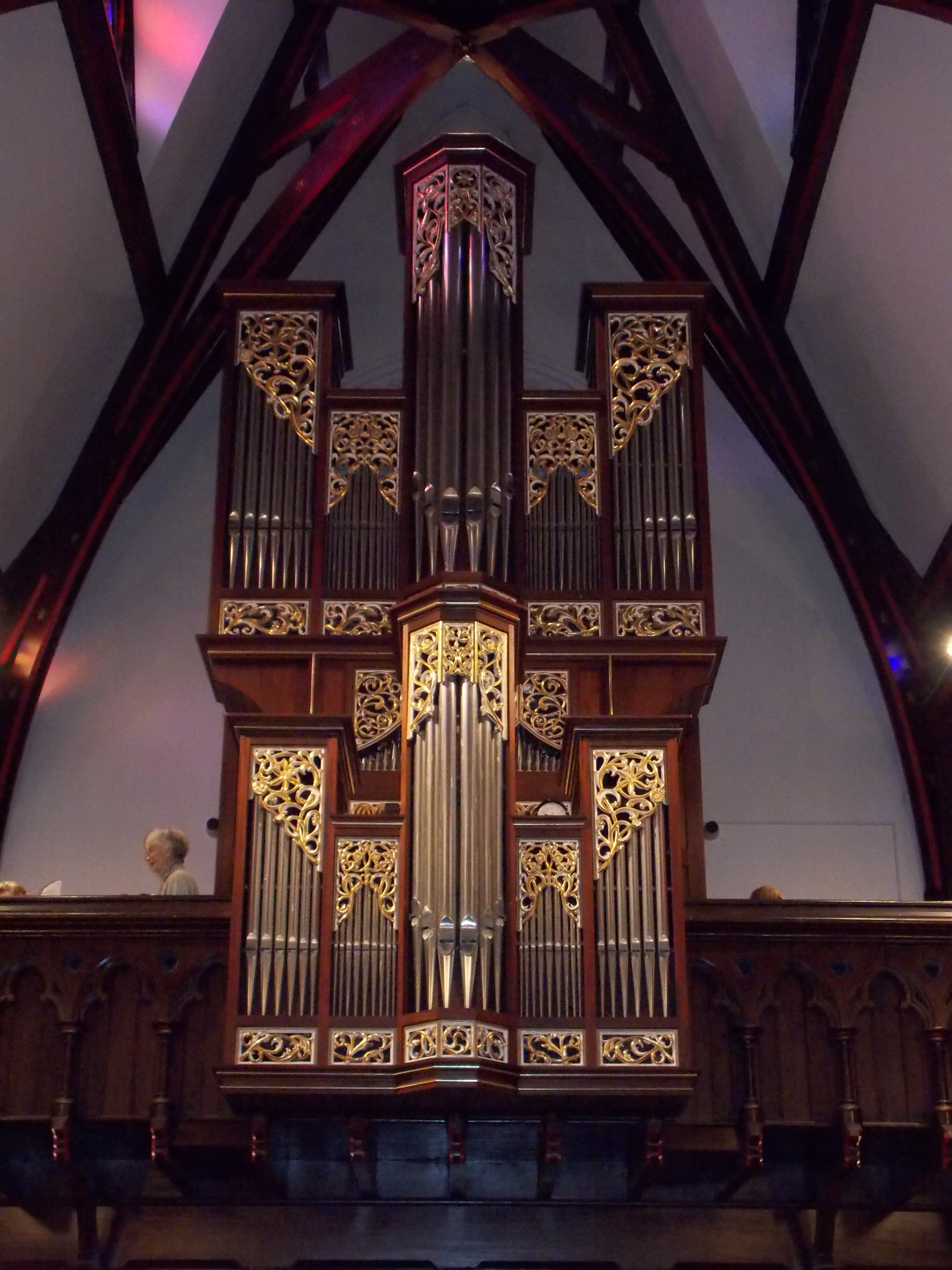
Wolff & Associés, opus 22 at Trinity Episcopal Cathedral in Davenport, Iowa

Hellmuth Wolff (September 3, 1937 – November 20, 2013) was a Canadian organ builder and the founder of the firm Wolff & Associés.

== Life ==
Born in Zurich, Switzerland, Wolff apprenticed to Metzler & Söhne in nearby Dietikon. He then worked for Rieger Orgelbau of Schwarzach, Vorarlberg, and Charles Fisk of Gloucester, Massachusetts, before emigrating to Canada in 1963 to be a designer in the new mechanical action department of Casavant Frères of St-Hyacinthe, Quebec.He worked briefly with Karl Wilhelm before establishing his own firm in 1968 in Laval, Quebec. Between 1968 and 2008, Wolff designed, built, and installed fifty instruments in churches, universities, concert halls, and homes across North America. Wolff's largest organ is of 61 stops, 85 ranks, which he installed in Christ Church Cathedral, Victoria, British Columbia in 2005.
