= Gordon V. Smith =

American Episcopal bishop

The Right Reverend Gordon V. Smith
- Bishop of Iowa
- Church: Episcopal Church
- Diocese: Iowa
- Elected: January 10, 1950
- In office: 1950–1971
- Predecessor: Elwood Lindsay Haines
- Successor: Walter Cameron Righter

Orders
- Ordination: October 28, 1931 by John N. McCormick
- Consecration: April 20, 1950 by Henry Knox Sherrill

Personal details
- Born: August 6, 1906 Kalamazoo, Michigan, United States
- Died: August 27, 1997 (aged 91) Palos Verdes Estates, California, United States
- Buried: Resthaven Cemetery, West Des Moines, Iowa
- Denomination: Anglican
- Parents: Joseph Martin Smith, Josephine Conklin
- Spouse: Lenora M. Hollister (m. 1935) Florence Wallace
- Children: 6

Gordon V. Smith (August 6, 1906 – August 27, 1997) was a bishop in the Episcopal Church in the United States of America. He was bishop of the Diocese of Iowa from 1950-1971. He was the first Bishop of Iowa who was canonically resident in the state when he was elected bishop.

== Biography ==
=== Early life and ministry ===
Gordon Smith was born in Kalamazoo, Michigan. He was educated at Kalamazoo College and General Theological Seminary, and was ordained a deacon in April 1931 by Bishop James De Wolf Perry, and a priest in October 1931 by Bishop John N. McCormick. He was rector of Grace Church, Ponca City, Oklahoma, from 1935 to 1943, then he moved to Iowa as rector of St. Paul's, Des Moines. He was consecrated Bishop of Iowa in 1950 and remained in that ministry for 21 years. His first wife, Lenora M. Hollister, died of lung cancer. He was remarried to Florence Wallace and they had six adult children, Gordon J. Smith, Henry Wallace, Melinda Heiberg, Diane Wallace, Joan Meyers and Linda Wallace-Gray. He was survived by Florence, their six children, and 21 grandchildren.

=== Bishop of Iowa ===
Smith was elected the sixth Bishop of Iowa in 1950 at a Special Convention. He was consecrated on April 20 of the same year at St. Paul's in Des Moines by Bishops Henry Knox Sherrill, William Blair Roberts and Lewis B. Whittemore. He was the 498th Episcopal bishop consecrated in the United States. He served the diocese during a period of growth and strengthened it financially. He served on the Episcopal Church's Executive Council for six years and attended the Lambeth Conference in 1958 and 1968.

In 1951, the Iowa Canterbury Association was organized and increased the emphasis of providing pastoral ministry to college students across the state. Two years later, the diocese celebrated its centennial and a short history was written by the diocesan historiographer Millington F. Carpenter. Celebrations in Cedar Rapids were carried nationwide by CBS Radio and from Trinity Cathedral in Davenport by WOC-TV.

In the 1960s, Smith was one of several bishops to serve as a trustee of Shimer College, then located near the Iowa border in far northwestern Illinois. Shimer was affiliated with the Episcopal Church from 1959 to 1973.

The Diocese of Iowa grew during the episcopate of Bishop Smith. For the first time, the number of priests equaled the number of congregations. The number of communicants grew from 10,908 in 1950 to 13,451 in 1960. The number of confirmations grew from 654 in 1950 to over 1,000 by 1960. By 1972, there were 14,522 communicants and 21,618 baptized people in the diocese.

=== Later life and death ===
After his retirement from the office of bishop, Smith moved to Seattle, Washington where he became the interim dean of St. Mark's Cathedral. He and his wife eventually moved to Palos Verdes Estates, California where he died of prostate cancer at 91. Funeral services were celebrated at St. Francis Church in Palos Verdes Estates and the Cathedral Church of St. Paul in Des Moines. He was buried in Resthaven Cemetery in West Des Moines.
