= Cathedral Church of Saint Paul (Des Moines, Iowa) =

St Paul's Cathedral
- St Paul's Episcopal Cathedral
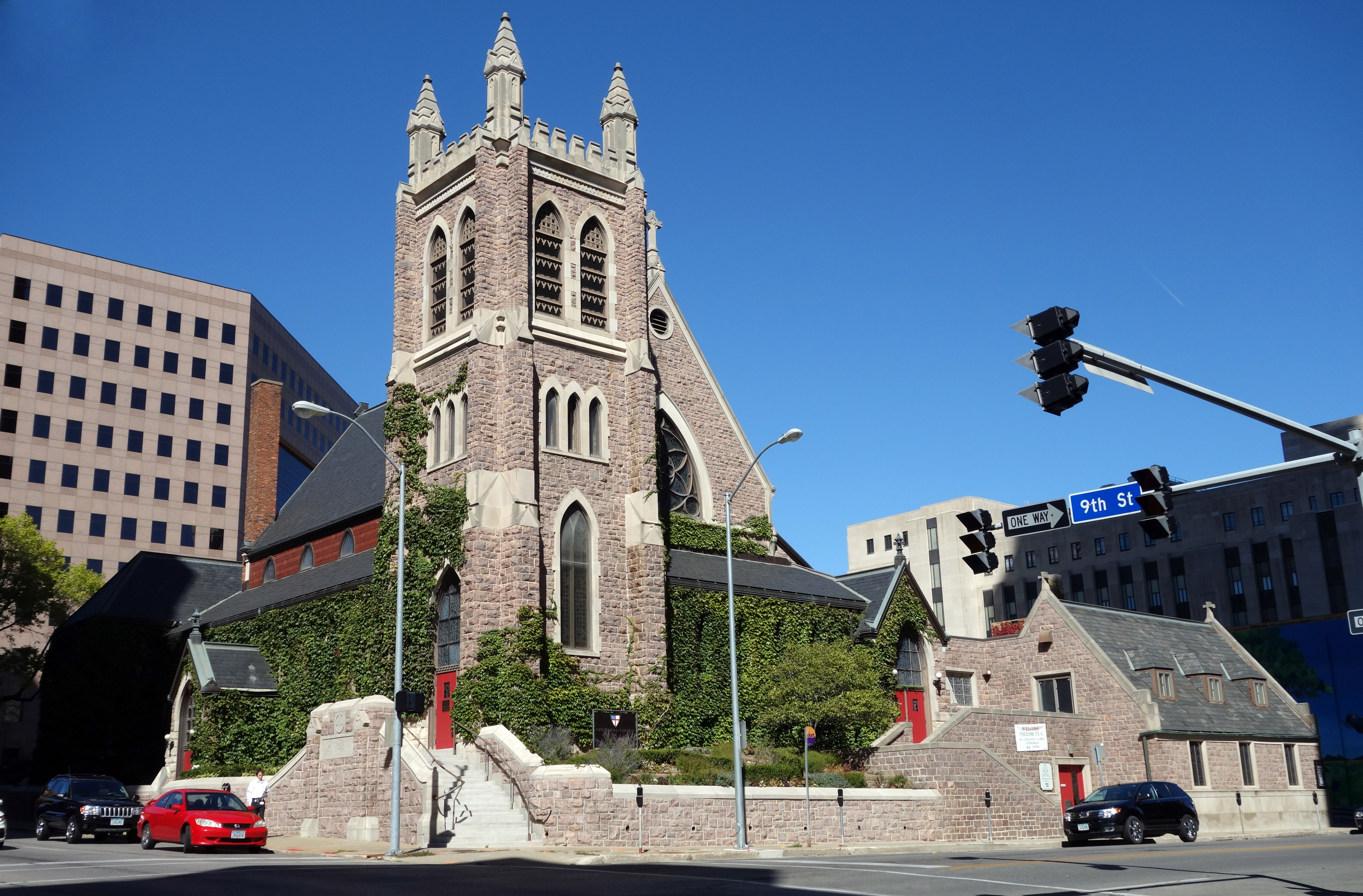
- St Paul's Cathedral
- Location: 815 High St. Des Moines, Iowa
- Country: United States
- Denomination: Episcopal Church
- Website: www.cathedralchurchofstpaul.org

History
- Status: Cathedral/Parish church
- Founded: October 15, 1854
- Dedication: Paul the Apostle

Architecture
- Functional status: Active
- Architect: Foster & Liebbe
- Style: Gothic Revival
- Completed: 1885

Specifications
- Length: 109 feet (33 m)
- Width: 73 feet (22 m)
- Materials: Granite

Administration
- Diocese: Iowa

Clergy
- Bishop: Betsey Monnot
- Dean: The Very Rev. Nicola Dance Chase
- St. Paul's Episcopal Church
- U.S. National Register of Historic Places
- Location within Iowa Location within the United States
- Coordinates: 41°35′16.95″N 93°37′44.4″W
- Area: less than one acre
- Built: 1953 (Parish House)
- Architect: Brooks Borg (Parish House)
- NRHP reference No.: 10000129
- Added to NRHP: March 31, 2010

St. Paul's Episcopal Cathedral, is located in downtown Des Moines, Iowa, United States. It is the cathedral church of the Episcopal Diocese of Iowa. The building was listed on the National Register of Historic Places as St. Paul's Episcopal Church.

The cathedral reported 351 members in 2025. Plate and pledge income for the congregation in 2025 was $209,285 with average Sunday attendance (ASA) of 83. This was a relative decrease from ASA of 147 persons reported in 2018.

== History ==
=== St. Paul's Episcopal Church ===
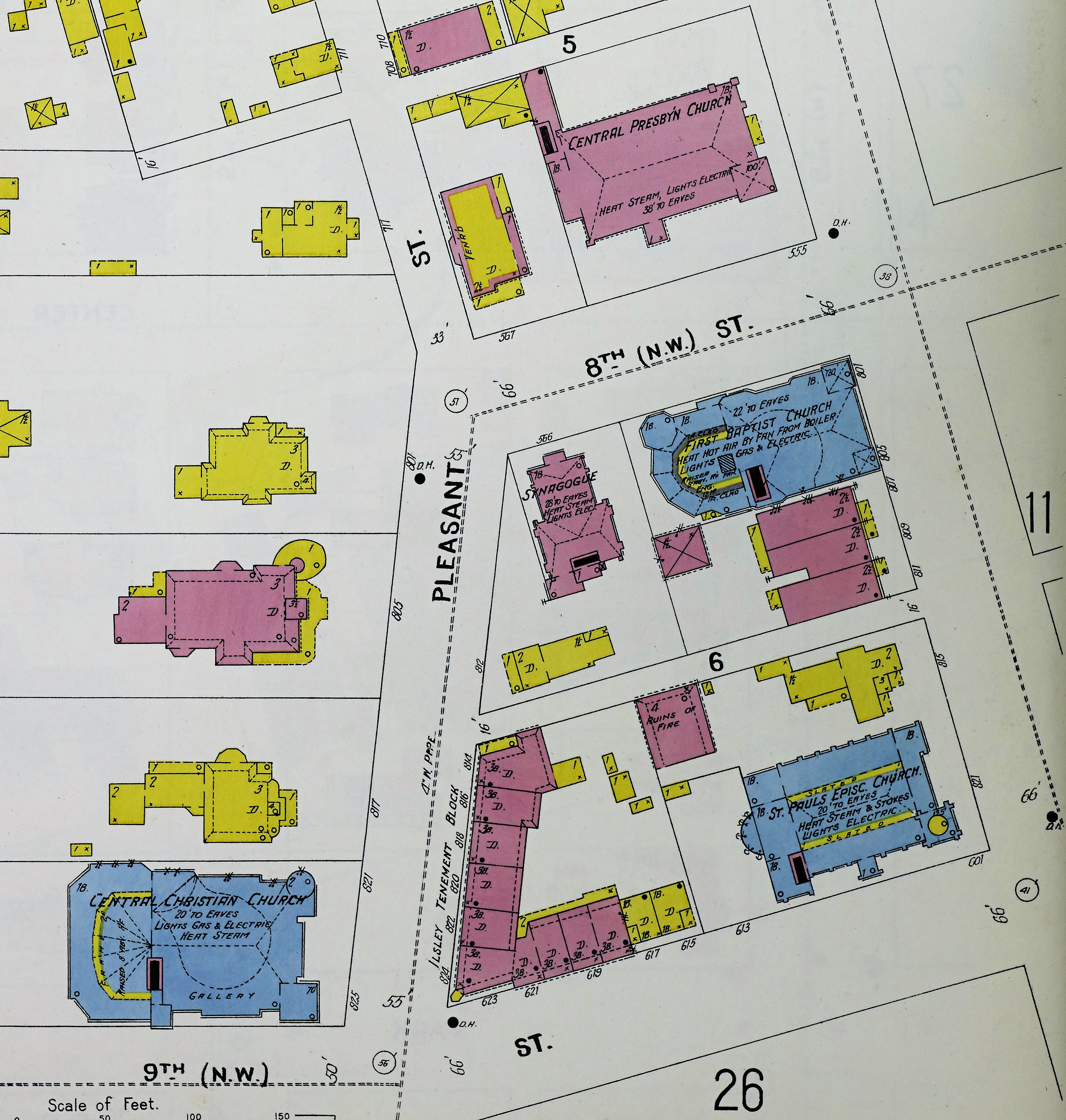
A 1901 Sanborn Fire Insurance Map showing Piety Hill. St. Paul's is in the lower-right in blue.

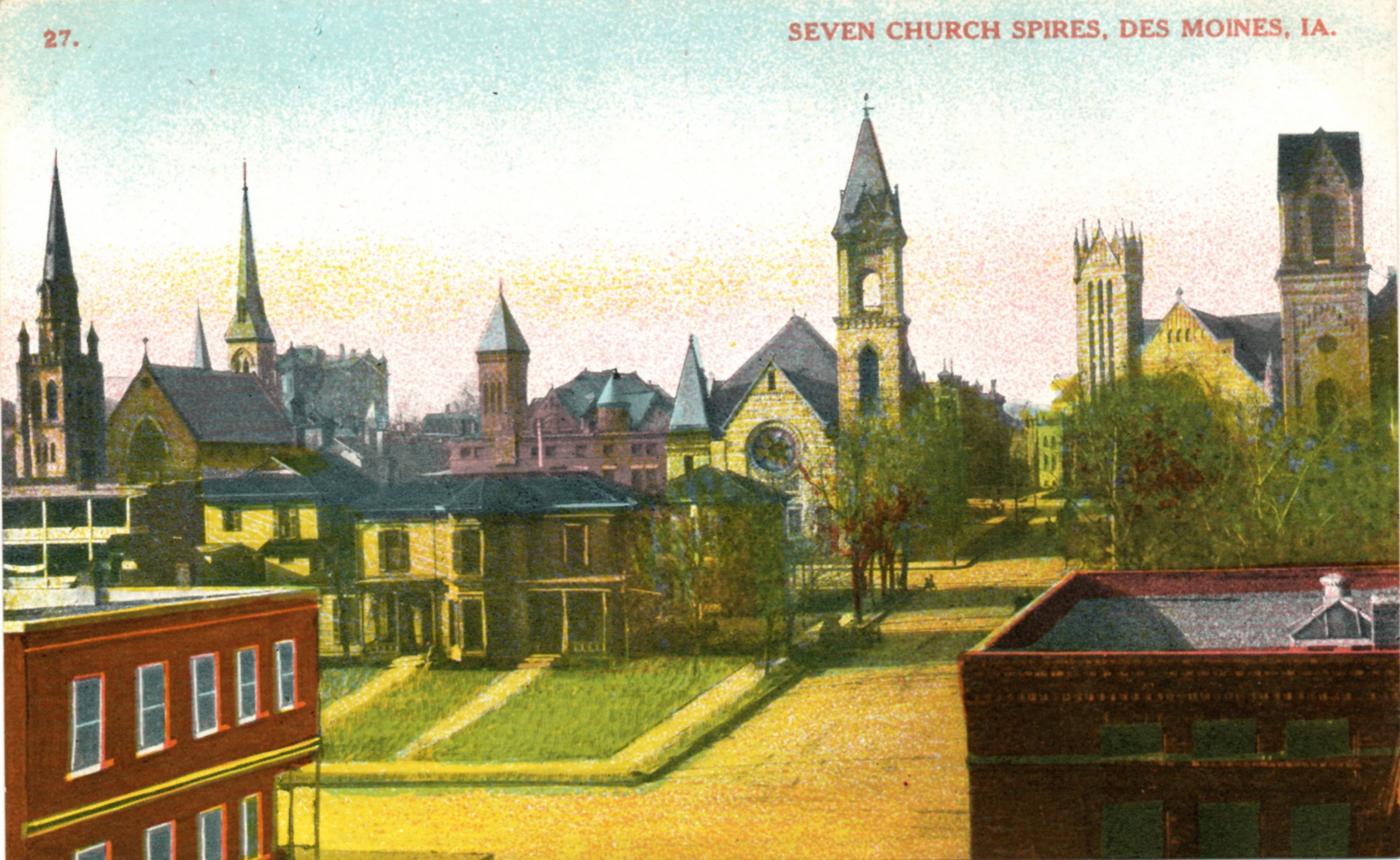
Postcard image of Piety Hill. St. Paul's is on the left with its original spire.

St. Paul's had its beginnings on October 15, 1854, when the first service was held at Fort Des Moines for ten communicants. A brick and frame church building was completed in 1857 on Seventh Street between Locust and Walnut Streets. Before its completion, services were held in the old Polk County Courthouse. By 1870 the congregation decided to replace its church building and purchased the current site. It would be another 13 years before construction began on the new church.

The present church building was completed in 1885, and the first service was held at Easter. It was designed by Des Moines architect William Foster of the architectural firm of Foster & Liebbe in the Gothic Revival style. Foster had studied architecture as an apprentice under Richard Upjohn, an early proponent of the use of Gothic Revival. Apparently, the parish vestry served as the contractor during construction and sub-contracted the work. Regan and McGorrish were responsible for the masonry work and a Mr. Wright was responsible for the carpentry work. Its basement was not exposed as it is now because Ninth and High Streets were lowered at a later date. Originally the church had a wooden steeple, but it was destroyed in a storm in the 1930s. It was replaced in the 1960s by a structure with a steel core. Later the tower was strengthened when the 25-bell carillon was added. A kitchen was added below the sanctuary in 1939. That work was designed by Brooks and Borg Architects of Des Moines. The Rambusch Company redecorated the chancel in the 1940s and the current reredos was added at that time.

In 1950 the parish's rector, the Rev. Gordon V. Smith, was elected the sixth Bishop of Iowa. The parish house was built in 1952. The building was designed by Brooks Borg Architects and Engineers of Des Moines. It was built by Arthur H. Neumann and Brothers, Inc. The new addition created space for classrooms, clergy and staff offices, the Guild Hall, and a chapel.

The Rev. S. Suzanne Peterson was ordained a deacon at St. Paul's on December 18, 1976. She was the first woman ordained in the Diocese of Iowa.

A $1.4 million renovation was undertaken in the 1980s when the congregation decided to remain downtown. William Dikis was the architect for the project. Further renovations were undertaken to the chancel area when St. Paul's was made the cathedral of the diocese. The cathedra (Bishop's chair), hand carved by a local artist, was installed in 1993, as was the current pipe organ. The new organ, Opus 3719, was built by Casavant Frères, Ltd of Saint-Hyacinthe, Quebec. The St. Sacrament Chapel was added at this time, reusing the original tabernacle, and providing accessibility for communicants with mobility challenges.

Over the years St. Paul's has assisted in the establishment of new mission churches in the Des Moines area. These churches and the year they were established include: St. Luke's in 1905, St. Andrew's in 1950, and St. Timothy's in 1960.

=== Cathedral Church ===
In 1992 the Diocese of Iowa decided that St. Paul's would become the liturgical cathedral for the Diocese of Iowa. It shares this distinction with the diocese's historic cathedral in Davenport, Trinity Cathedral. The liturgical ceremony designating St. Paul's as the cathedral took place on October 23, 1993. Bishop C. Christopher Epting, who had been the diocesan bishop since 1988 took his seat in the new cathedral in December 1993. Present at the ceremony was the founding Dean, Michael Barlowe (later Executive Officer of the General Convention of the Episcopal Church), and Ted Luscombe, the retired Bishop of Brechin and former Primus of the Scottish Episcopal Church.

=== Significance ===
The cathedral was listed on the National Register of Historic Places in 2010. Its significance is derived from its association with the architectural firm of Foster & Liebbe. St. Paul's is also the only one of three churches designed by the firm in Des Moines that still stands. While the 1952 parish house is not considered as significant, it does reflect the Gothic style of the church and therefore does not detract from it. It is also associated with the prominent Des Moines architecture firm of Brooks Borg. The cathedral is also significant as the last religious building in a four-block section of downtown known as "Piety Hill." The other five churches and a synagogue either disbanded or moved to other locations.

== Architecture ==
The cathedral church measures approximately 109 by 73 feet (33 by 22 m). The exterior walls are load-bearing masonry, and are composed of broken faced red granite that is laid in random ashlar. The exposed basement level is broken faced gray-buff limestone. The central nave is taller than the side naves creating a clerestory that is covered with red slate. The tower sits forward of the main body of the church. It features buttresses on its three exposed corners that have stone caps at each of their descending levels. The four top corners of the tower are marked with stone pinnacles. In between the cut stone cornice is crenellated with dressed stone on top. The main entrances into the church are located on the west face of the tower and on the east side of the narthex in a gabled structure facing High Street. The front gable of the cathedral has a tracery window and a stone cross at its peak.

The nave is six bays deep with a pointed-arch window in each bay. There are similar, but shorter, windows in the clerestory. All the window openings are filled with stained glass. The ceiling in the nave is vaulted, and it is held up by a line of columns. Wood tracery extends from the columns to the side walls over the side aisles. The chancel floor is elevated above the nave floor. The wooden altar, pulpit, choir seats, cathedra, and altar rail are located here. There are seven windows on the apse wall depicting Jesus Christ, the Four Evangelists, St. Peter, and St. Paul. The windows in the middle are obscured by the reredos. The organ chamber is to the left of the chancel. The pews are original to the church.

The Guild Hall on the street-side of the parish house is clad in red granite like the cathedral. The rest of the building behind it is brick. The architectural style of the Guild Hall is a mid-20th century interpretation of the Gothic style. The rest of the parish house is two stories in height with a level mostly below grade. An enclosed courtyard is located between the cathedral and the parish house. The Guild Hall has a gable roof while the rest of the building has a flat roof.

== Pipe organ ==
The Casavant Frères Ltée., (Opus 3719, 1997) pipe organ is located in the front of the sanctuary with some of the pipes exposed. It features a traditional style console with roll top. It is equipped with three manuals, seven divisions, 84 stops, 51 registers, 68 ranks, 3904 pipes, and electro-pneumatic (EP) chests. The manual compass is 61 notes and the pedal compass is 32 notes. The drawknobs are arraigned in vertical rows on angled jambs. There are balanced swell shoes/pedals with a standard AGO placement. The combination action is a computerized/digital system. Rounding out the features are AGO Standard (concave radiating) pedalboard, reversible full organ/tutti thumb piston, reversible full organ/tutti toe stud, combination action thumb pistons, combination action toe studs, coupler reversible thumb pistons, and coupler reversible toe studs.

Stoplist:

GRAND ORGUE

- 16' Violonbasse 12
- 8' Montre 61
- 8' Violon 61
- 8' Flûte à cheminée 61
- 8' Flûte harmonique 49 a
- 4' Prestant 61
- 4' Flûte ouverte 61
- 2 2/3' Quinte majeure 61
- 2' Doublette 61
- III Cornet 183
- IV Fourniture 244
- 16' Bombarde L/2 12
- 8' Trompette 61
- Tremblant
- Unison Off
- 8' Tuba Mirabilis CH
- 4' Tuba Clarion CH
- Chimes (existing)
- MIDI

RÉCIT

- 16' Bourdon doux 12
- 8' Diapason 61
- 8' Flûte majeure 61
- 8' Viole de gambe 61
- 8' Voix céleste 54
- 4' Octave 61
- 4' Flûte à fuseau 61
- 2 2/3' Nazard 61
- 2' Quarte de nazard 61
- 1 3/5' Tierce 61
- III-IV Plein jeu 232
- 16' Basson L/2 12
- 8' Trompette harmonique 61
- 8' Hautbois 61
- 4' Clairon harmonique 61
- Tremblant
- Sub
- Unison Off
- Super
- MIDI

CHAMADE (floating)

- 16' Bombarde-en-chamade tc
- 8' Trompette-en-chamade 61
- 4' Clairon-en-chamade 12

ANTIPHONAL (floating)

- 16' Bourdon 12
- 8' Montre 61
- 8' Bourdon 61
- 4' Prestant 61
- 4' Flûte conique 61
- 2' Principal 61
- II-IV Mixture 184

CHOEUR

- 8' Principal étroit 61
- 8' Voce Umana 49
- 8' Bourdon à cheminée 61
- 8' Flûte majeure RE
- 8' Flûte douce 61
- 8' Flûte céleste 49
- 4' Principal 61
- 4' Flûte octaviante 61
- 2' Principal 61
- 1 1/3' Larigot 61
- 1' Piccolo 61
- III Cymbale 183
- 16' Douçaine 12
- 8' Clarinet 61
- 8' Voix humaine 61
- 4' Cor anglais 61
- Tremblant
- Sub
- Unison off
- Super
- 16' Tuba Magna tc
- 8' Tuba Mirabilis 61
- 4' Tuba Clarion 12
- Carillon pf
- MIDI

PÉDALE

- 32' Contre violon 12 b
- 16' Contrebasse 32
- 16' Soubasse 32
- 16' Violonbasse GO
- 16' Bourdon doux RE
- 8' Octavebasse 32
- 8' Flûte à cheminée GO
- 8' Flûte majeure RE
- 4' Octave 32
- 4' Flûte ouverte GO
- III Théorbe --
- V Mixture 160
- 32' Contre trombone 12
- 16' Trombone 32
- 16' Bombarde GO
- 16' Basson RE
- 16' Douçaine CH
- 8' Trompette 12
- 8' Trompette GO
- 8' Clarinet CH
- 8' Tuba Mirabilis CH
- 4' Tuba Clarion CH
- 4' Hautbois RE
- Chimes
- MIDI

ANTIPHONAL PEDAL

- 16' Bourdon AN
- 8' Bourdon AN

a=1-12 from Flûte à cheminée

b=added in 2009; located at the rear of the nave

== See also ==
- List of the Episcopal cathedrals of the United States
- List of cathedrals in the United States
