= Christopher Epting =

American Episcopal bishop

The Right Reverend Carl Christopher Epting D.D.
- Bishop of Iowa
- Church: Episcopal Church
- Diocese: Iowa
- In office: 1988–2001
- Predecessor: Walter C. Righter
- Successor: Alan Scarfe
- Other posts: Deputy for Ecumenical and Interreligious Relations for the Episcopal Church (2001-2009)

Orders
- Ordination: November 8 1972
- Consecration: September 27, 1988 by Edmond L. Browning

Personal details
- Born: November 26, 1946 (age 79) Greenville, South Carolina, United States
- Denomination: Anglican
- Spouse: Pamela Flagg (m. 1969; died 2000) Susanne Watson (m. 2001)

Carl Christopher Epting (born November 26, 1946) is a bishop in the Episcopal Church in the United States of America. He served the Diocese of Iowa as coadjutor bishop and diocesan bishop from 1988 to 2001, and as the Deputy for Ecumenical and Interreligious Relations for the Episcopal Church from 2001 to 2009. He then served as the Assistant Bishop of the Diocese of Chicago from November 2011 through December 2015 before retiring. Since 2021, Bishop Epting and his wife, Susanne, have resided in Englewood, Colorado.

== Early life and ministry ==
Epting was born in Greenville, South Carolina, and was raised in Orlando.

He earned a bachelor's degree from the University of Florida, a Master of Divinity degree from Seabury-Western Theological Seminary and a Master of Sacred Theology degree from General Theological Seminary. He did his Clinical Pastoral Education at the University of Iowa. He married Pamela Flagg in 1969 and they were married until her death in 2000. In 2001, he married Susanne Watson, a deacon. Epting was ordained a deacon in April, 1972, and a priest in November of the same year.

Epting served 16 years in parish ministry in the Diocese of Central Florida. He had been a curate at Holy Trinity Church in Melbourne, a vicar at parishes in Mulberry and Lakeland, and a Canon Residentiary at St. John's Cathedral in Jacksonville.

== Diocese of Iowa ==
Epting was serving as rector at St. Mark's Church in Cocoa, Florida, when he was elected coadjutor bishop of the Diocese of Iowa. Epting was consecrated a bishop on September 27, 1988, by Edmond L. Browning, the Presiding Bishop, with William H. Folwell, Bishop of Central Florida, and Walter C. Righter, Bishop of Iowa. He was the 830th Episcopal bishop consecrated in the United States. Nineteen bishops attended the liturgy, including Ted Luscombe, Bishop of Brechin and former Primus of the Scottish Episcopal Church, and Bernard Mkhabela, Bishop of Swaziland.

Epting succeeded Righter as Bishop of Iowa upon Righter's retirement at the end of 1988. During his episcopate in Iowa he renewed the diaconate, spiritual formation and ecumenical relations. In 1989 the diocese began participation in Education for Ministry, an extension program of the School of Theology of the University of the South. The diocese was organized into deaneries in June 1992. The same year St. Paul's Church in Des Moines became the diocese's liturgical cathedral and Trinity Cathedral in Davenport became the historical cathedral of the diocese.

The diocese lost a couple of its institutions in the 1990s. In 1994 St. Luke's Hospital in Davenport merged with Mercy Hospital and became Genesis Health System. The Episcopal Center for Camps and Conferences was sold in 1996 because of its deteriorated condition and the cost to repair and replace the facilities.

Epting served in leadership positions in the state council of churches and Ecumenical Ministries in Iowa. He also chaired the Episcopal Church's writing team for Called to Common Mission, which established full communion between the Episcopal Church and the Evangelical Lutheran Church in America. In 1998, Epting attended the Lambeth Conference in England. He joined with 145 other bishops who disagreed with resolutions on the ordination of women, ordination of homosexuals and blessing same-sex unions. He signed a resolution affirming gay Anglicans and recognized the hurt that was caused by the passage of the resolutions. He also continued to ordain and deploy women as deacons and priests in Iowa.

== Deputy for Ecumenical and Interreligious Relations ==
In 2001, the Presiding Bishop of the Episcopal Church, Frank Griswold, asked Epting to serve as the church's Deputy for Ecumenical and Interreligious Relations. It was the first time a bishop served in this capacity. He continued in the position after Katharine Jefferts Schori became the Presiding Bishop. In this position, Epting served on the Central Committee of the World Council of Churches and the Governing Board of the National Council of Churches. He staffed the bilateral dialogues with the Roman Catholic Church and Presbyterian Church, the Lutheran-Episcopal Coordinating Committee, the Jewish-Christian dialogue of the National Council of Churches, and the Inter Anglican Standing Commission on Ecumenical Relations. He retired as the church's ecumenical officer at the end of 2009.

== Later life ==
On January 1, 2010, Epting became the interim dean at Trinity Cathedral in Davenport, Iowa. He became the Assistant Bishop of the Diocese of Chicago in January 2012. In late October, 2015 the Diocese of Chicago announced that Epting was planning to retire at the end of December.
