= Betsey Monnot =

Episcopal bishop of the Diocese of Iowa

The Right Reverend Betsey Monnot
- Bishop of Iowa
- Church: Episcopal Church
- Diocese: Iowa
- Elected: July 30, 2021
- In office: 2021-present
- Predecessor: Alan Scarfe
- Successor: Incumbent

Orders
- Consecration: December 18, 2021 by Michael Curry
- Rank: Bishop

Personal details
- Denomination: Anglican
- Spouse: Michael
- Children: 3
- Education: Church Divinity School of the Pacific

Elizabeth Lockwood Hawley Monnot is the tenth diocesan bishop of Iowa in The Episcopal Church.

== Biography ==
Monnot was elected on the third ballot as the X Bishop of Iowa at a special diocesan convention held on July 31, 2021, in Des Moines. At the time of election, she was priest-in-charge of St. Clement's Episcopal Church in Rancho Cordova, California. Prior to that she was co-rector with her husband at All Saint's Episcopal Church in Sacramento, California. A majority of the standing committees and Bishops were required to consent to her election, and these consents were all obtained by mid September, 2021.

Bishop Monnot was consecrated in Des Moines on the Advent ember day of December 18, 2021, in a ceremony led by Presiding Bishop Michael Curry. Monnot is the 1,139th Bishop consecrated in the Episcopal Church, and the first female Bishop of Iowa. Bishops Alan Scarfe, Chilton R. Knudsen, and Lucinda Ashby acted as co-consecrators. Ecumenical co-consecrators included Amy Current of the Evangelical Lutheran Church in America and Archbishop Melissa M. Skelton of the Anglican Church of Canada.

Her husband, Michael, is rector at All Saint's Episcopal Church, prior to which he was a Liaison to the Secretary of State for the Green Party of California.

== See also ==
- List of Episcopal bishops of the United States
- Historical list of the Episcopal bishops of the United States
