= Trinity Memorial Episcopal Church (Mapleton, Iowa) =

- U.S. National Register of Historic Places
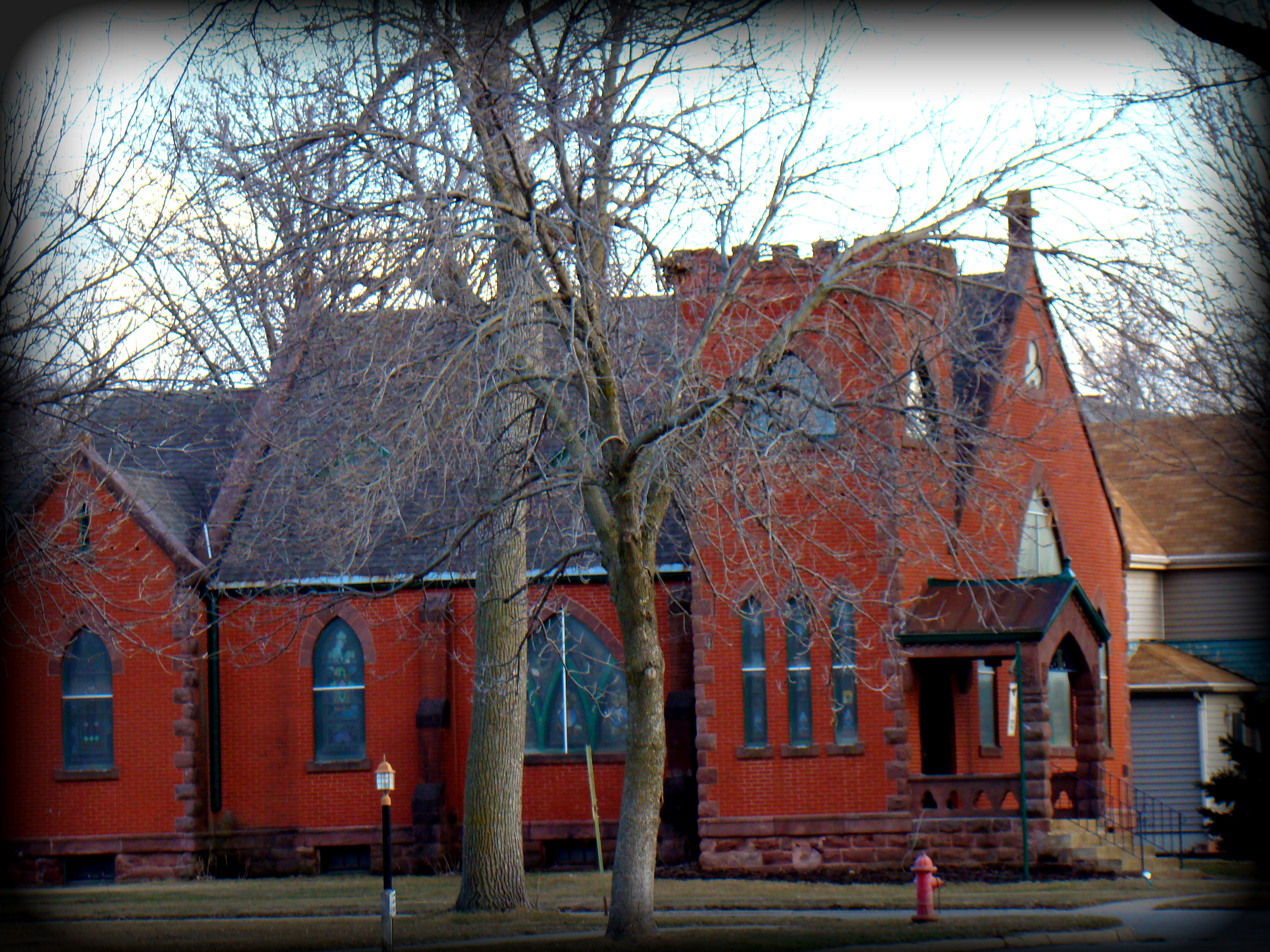
- Side and front of the church

- Location within Iowa Location within the United States
- Location: 302 S. 7th St. Mapleton, Iowa
- Coordinates: 42°09′47.7″N 95°47′18.6″W
- Area: less than one acre
- Built: 1896
- Built by: Albert and Edmund Jenkinson Contractors
- Architect: Edward S. Hammatt
- Architectural style: Gothic Revival; Romanesque Revival
- NRHP reference No.: 90001217
- Added to NRHP: August 10, 1990

Trinity Memorial Episcopal Church is a former parish church in the Episcopal Diocese of Iowa. The historic building is located in Mapleton, Iowa, United States. It was listed on the National Register of Historic Places in 1990. The former church building and hall now house the Museum of American History.

== History ==
The congregation was established in the mid-1880s. The church building was built as a memorial to Flora E. (Giddings) Whiting by her husband C.I. Whiting, a local banker. It was designed by Edward S. Hammatt from Davenport, Iowa. Trinity Memorial was one of at least seven churches he designed in the Diocese of Iowa. In addition, he also designed Kemper Hall, an Episcopal school for boys, and St. Katherine's Hall, a school for girls, both of which were located in Davenport. Albert and Edmund Jenkinson Contractors of Sioux City, Iowa built the building. The cornerstone was laid on May 28, 1896, by Bishop William Stevens Perry with the assistance of the Quarry Lodge No. 404 A.F. & A.M. of Mapleton. The church was consecrated on September 20, 1896. It cost approximately $15,000 to build the church and it was deeded to the Trustees of the Diocese of Iowa the year it was built debt-free.

The stained glass windows were donated by St. Thomas Episcopal Church in Sioux City. They had been removed from their former church before it was torn down in 1892. A rectory, which is now a private home, had been built at the same time as the church. The Rev. William Frost was the parish's first resident priest to live in the house. The Guild Hall was built in 1926.

The Rev. Vine Victor Deloria, the first priest of Native American heritage to serve in the Diocese of Iowa, was priest-in-charge at Trinity Memorial, Trinity in Denison, and St. John's in Vail from 1951 to 1953. After working in Washington, D.C. he returned to the diocese to serve as vicar at St. Paul's in Durant from 1959-1960 after which he left the diocese.

The funeral of Charles G. Whiting, son of C.I. and Flora Whiting, was the last liturgy celebrated in the church in 1984. Services to deconsecrate the church were held in 1988. The church building and hall were purchased that same year by Keith Robinson for the museum. His collection of political Americana provided the nucleus of the museum's collection, and remains its primary exhibit. The museum also has artifacts of local interest that appear in the context of significant national events.

== Architecture ==
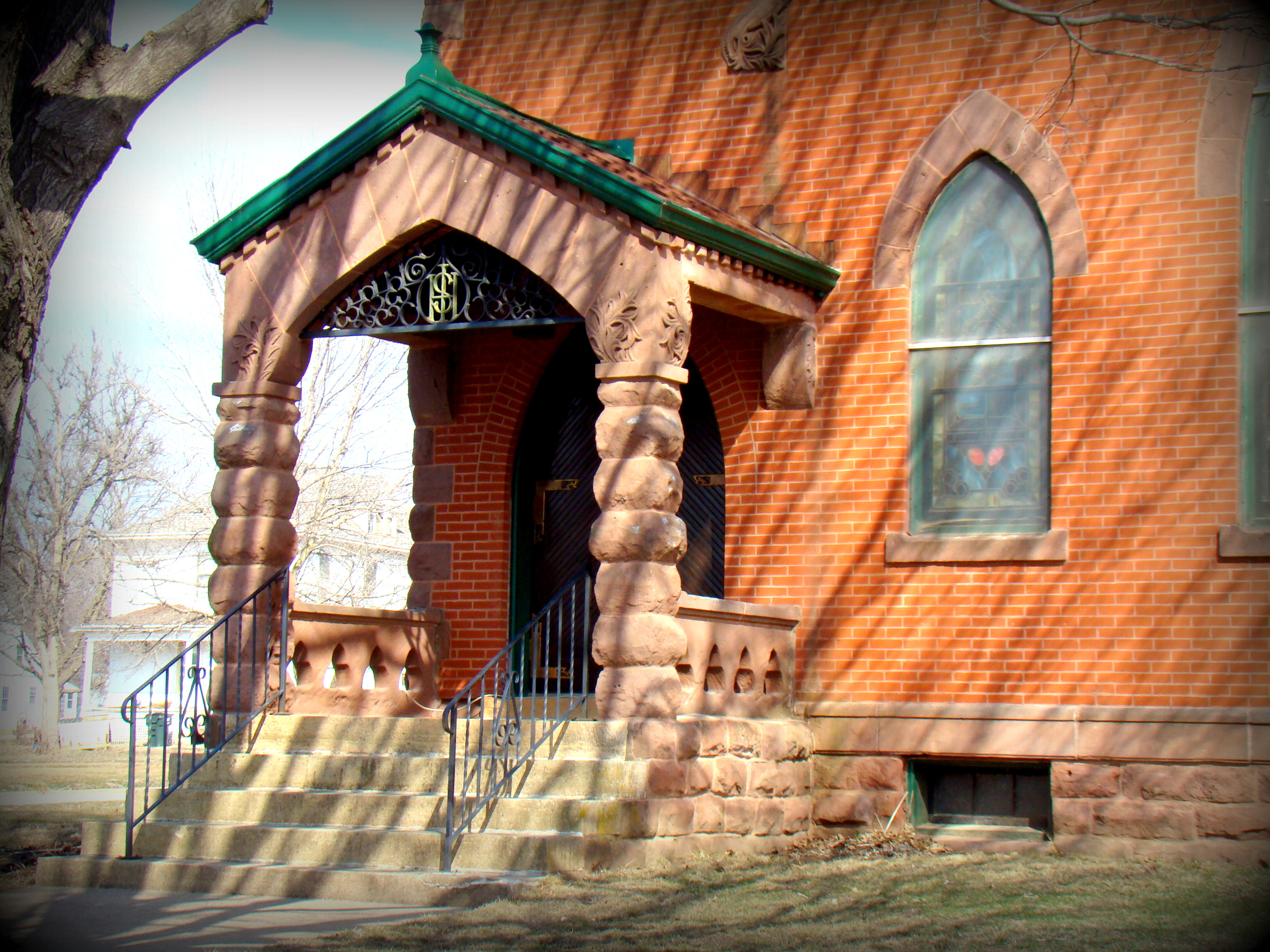
Church entryway

The church building is basically rectangular in shape, and measures 63 by 33 feet (19 by 10 m). It was designed in a combination of the Gothic Revival and Romanesque Revival styles. The Gothic is found in the polychrome finish of the brick and stone, the pointed arch windows and doors, the wall buttresses, the battlements on top the corner tower, and the steeply pitched roof with steep cross gables. The Romanesque is found in the short bell tower, the broad roof plane, the rusticated stone on the foundation, the entryway, and the quoins on the corners. The main facade on the west side is dominated by a large stained glass window that is flanked by two smaller windows. In the gable peak is a trefoil window below a large stone cross. A small narthex is located at the main entryway in the tower. The sandstone pillars of the portico are connected by a sandstone arch. Wrought iron grill work is located in the arch. Trefoils are cut into the sandstone railings. Medium-sized windows dominate both side elevations. The small extension on the north elevation was designed to house a pipe organ that was never installed. The sacristy was in the extension on the south elevation. The rounded apse on the east side of the building has four windows and is where the altar was located on the inside. A small cross tops the gable on the east side of the church above the apse.
