= Connor House (Rock Island, Illinois) =

Historic house in Illinois, United States

- U.S. National Register of Historic Places
- U.S. Historic district – Contributing property
- Rock Island Landmark
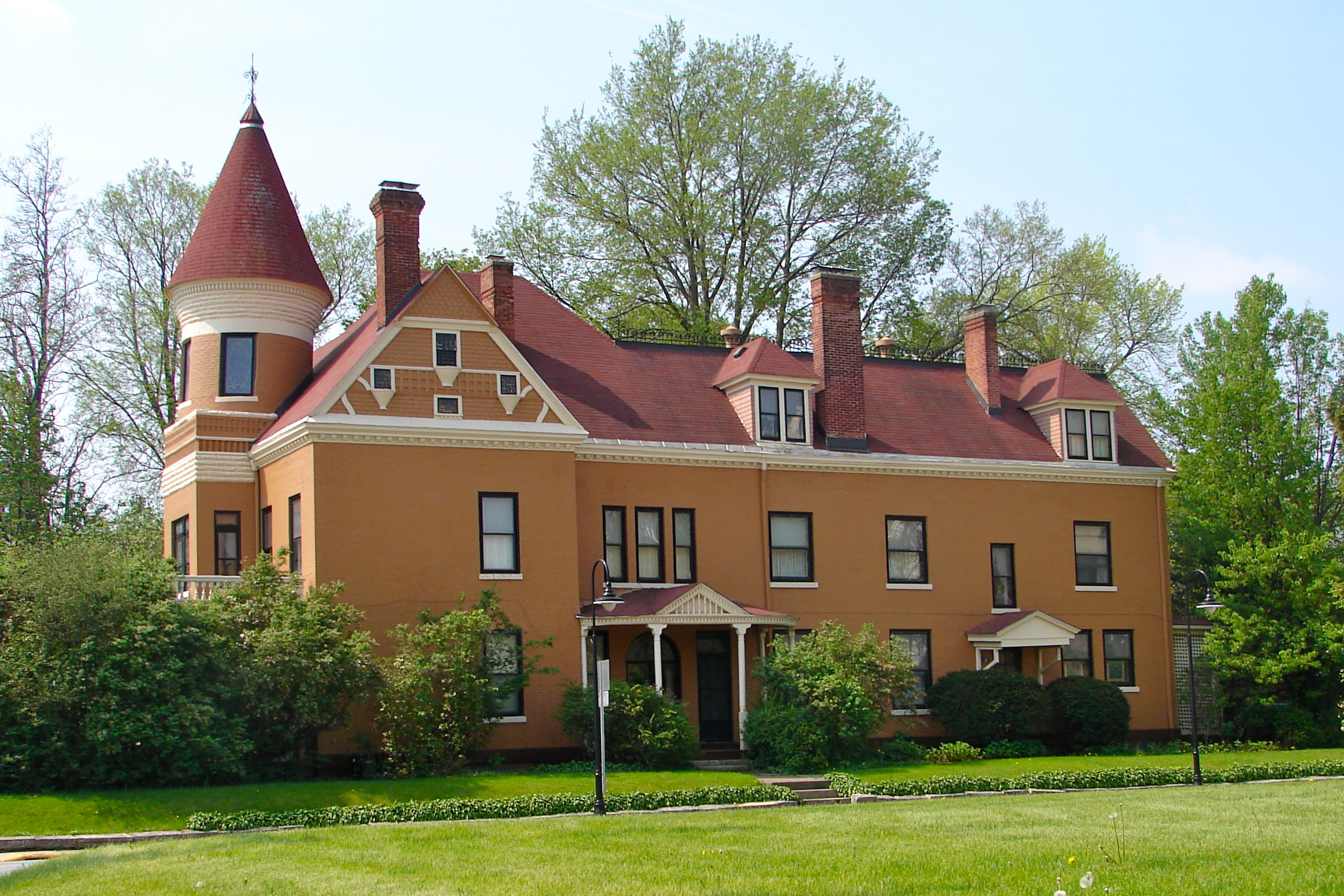

- Location within Illinois Location within the United States
- Location: 702 Twentieth St. Rock Island, Illinois
- Coordinates: 41°30′18″N 90°34′19″W
- Area: less than one acre
- Built: 1888
- Architect: E.S. Hammatt
- Architectural style: Queen Anne; Romanesque Revival; Classical Revival
- NRHP reference No.: 88001227

Significant dates
- Added to NRHP: August 11, 1988
- Designated RIL: 1987

The Connor House is an historic building located in Rock Island, Illinois, United States. It was designated a Rock Island Landmark in 1987. The house was individually listed on the National Register of Historic Places in 1988, and it was included as a contributing property in the Broadway Historic District in 1998.

== History ==
It is thought that the house was built for industrialist Homer Lowery, and it is an early example of the Queen Anne style in the city. The house's brick construction was also an oddity in the area's other Queen Anne style homes. The house was extensively remodeled for Peter Fries’ daughter's wedding in 1906. The home was later owned by the Conner family and since 1944 by the Parker family.

== Architecture ==
Davenport, Iowa architect E.S. Hammatt designed the house. He was also the architect for Lincoln School in Rock Island, as well as Kemper Hall and several additions made to St. Katherine's Hall in Davenport. In addition to the Queen Anne style, the house also exhibits elements of the Italianate style as well. It features a three-story conical tower, stylized shingles, symmetrical fenestrations, window bays, four varied porches, and stone window sills and lintels. Part of the remodeling project in 1906 was the full façade front porch. It features plain columns built atop brick piers and topped with Ionic capitals. The columns are in pairs and triplets. The large wing on the back of the house and the brick carriage house was also added in 1906. The Seventh Avenue side of the home features one of the best examples of residential stained glass in Rock Island. It contains a semi-circular stained glass panel atop a large square beveled glass sash. The 99 faceted jewels are fashioned in an asymmetrical floral design.
