= Renwick Building =

- U.S. National Register of Historic Places
- U.S. Historic district – Contributing property
- Davenport Register of Historic Properties
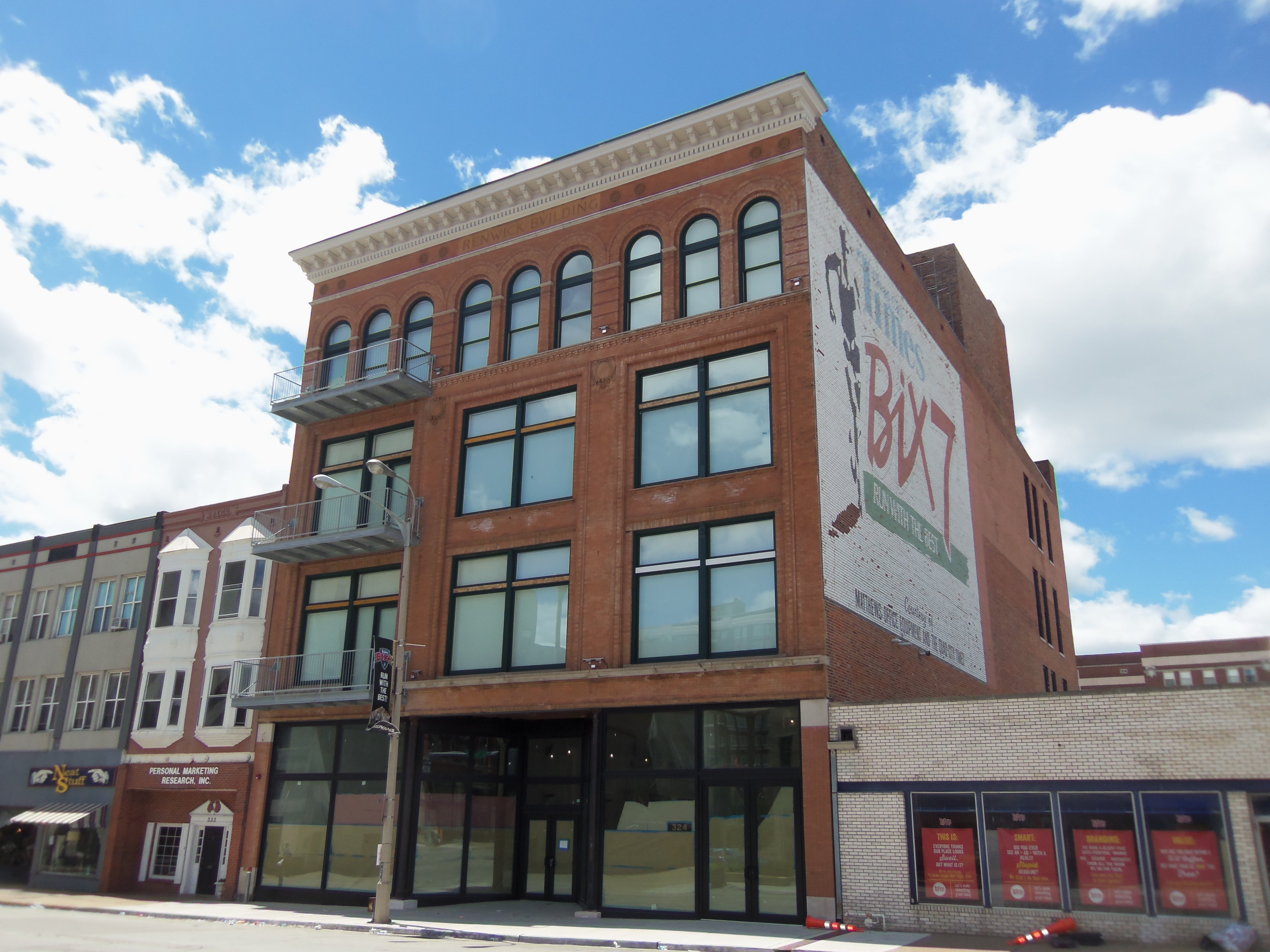

- Location within Iowa Location within the United States
- Location: 324 Brady Street; Davenport, Iowa
- Coordinates: 41°31′24″N 90°34′27″W
- Area: less than one acre
- Built: 1897
- Built by: C.E. Osborn; John Peters
- Architect: Clausen & Burrows
- Architectural style: Early Commercial
- Part of: Davenport Downtown Commercial Historic District (ID100005546)
- MPS: Davenport MRA
- NRHP reference No.: 83002491
- DRHP No.: 34

Significant dates
- Added to NRHP: July 7, 1983
- Designated DRHP: February 2, 2000

The Renwick Building is a historic building located in downtown Davenport, Iowa, United States. It has been listed on the National Register of Historic Places since 1983, and on the Davenport Register of Historic Properties since 2000. In 2020 it was included as a contributing property in the Davenport Downtown Commercial Historic District. It is known locally for the large painted sign on the north side of the building depicting the Bix 7 Road Race.

== History ==
The building was rebuilt in 1901 to replace the original 1893 structure that was destroyed by fire, and was commissioned by sisters Margaret and Rebecca Renwick. It is frequently (but wrongly) attributed to their brother William Renwick, who was a prosperous area industrialist in the late 19th and early 20th centuries. Two of the family's Davenport houses are also on the National Register of Historic Places, the Renwick House on Brady Street and the Renwick Mansion, which is a contributing property in the St. Katherine's Historic District. The reconstructed building contained 40,000 square feet of combined retail and warehouse space and was designed for tenant Drake Furniture & Carpet Co.; it continued to house various successor furniture stores over the years. The storefront was modernized in the 1930s. The building sat empty until 2012 when Restoration St. Louis, who also renovated the Forrest Block and the Hotel Blackhawk, began a $4.5 million renovation of the building. The upper floors house 18 loft-style apartments and commercial space on the main floor.

== Architecture ==
The Renwick Building is a steel frame and red brick commercial building. The four-story building is an outstanding example of the Chicago Commercial Style. It was designed by the Danish architect Frederick G. Clausen and his firm Clausen & Burrows, and constructed by Davenport contractors C.E. Osborn and John Peters. The brick façade acts as the building's skin around the steel frame, which supports the structure. This approach allowed a greater expanse of windows, which are found in this building. Decorative elements are found at the top of the building. Romanesque Revival arched windows in a tri-partite configuration line the fourth floor on the facade, and the building is topped with a heavy ornate cornice.
