= Edinger =

Edinger is a surname. Notable people with the surname include:

- Claudio Edinger (born 1952), Brazilian photographer
- Edward F. Edinger (1922–1998), medical psychiatrist, Jungian analyst and American writer
- Eva-Maria Edinger (born 1966), former synchronized swimmer from Austria
- Evan Edinger (born 1990), American-born YouTuber living in London
- Ludwig Edinger (1855–1918), German anatomist and neurologist and co-founder of the University of Frankfurt
- Paul Edinger (born 1978), former gridiron football placekicker
- Rudolf Edinger (1902–1997), Austrian weightlifter
- Tilly Edinger (1897–1967), German-American paleontologist and the founder of paleoneurology

== See also ==
- Edinger–Westphal nucleus, parasympathetic pre-ganglionic nucleus that innervates the iris sphincter muscle and the ciliary muscle
- Edward Edinger House, located in the West End of Davenport, Iowa, United States
