= St. Paul's Episcopal Church (Durant, Iowa) =

- St. Paul's Episcopal Church and Parish Hall
- U.S. National Register of Historic Places
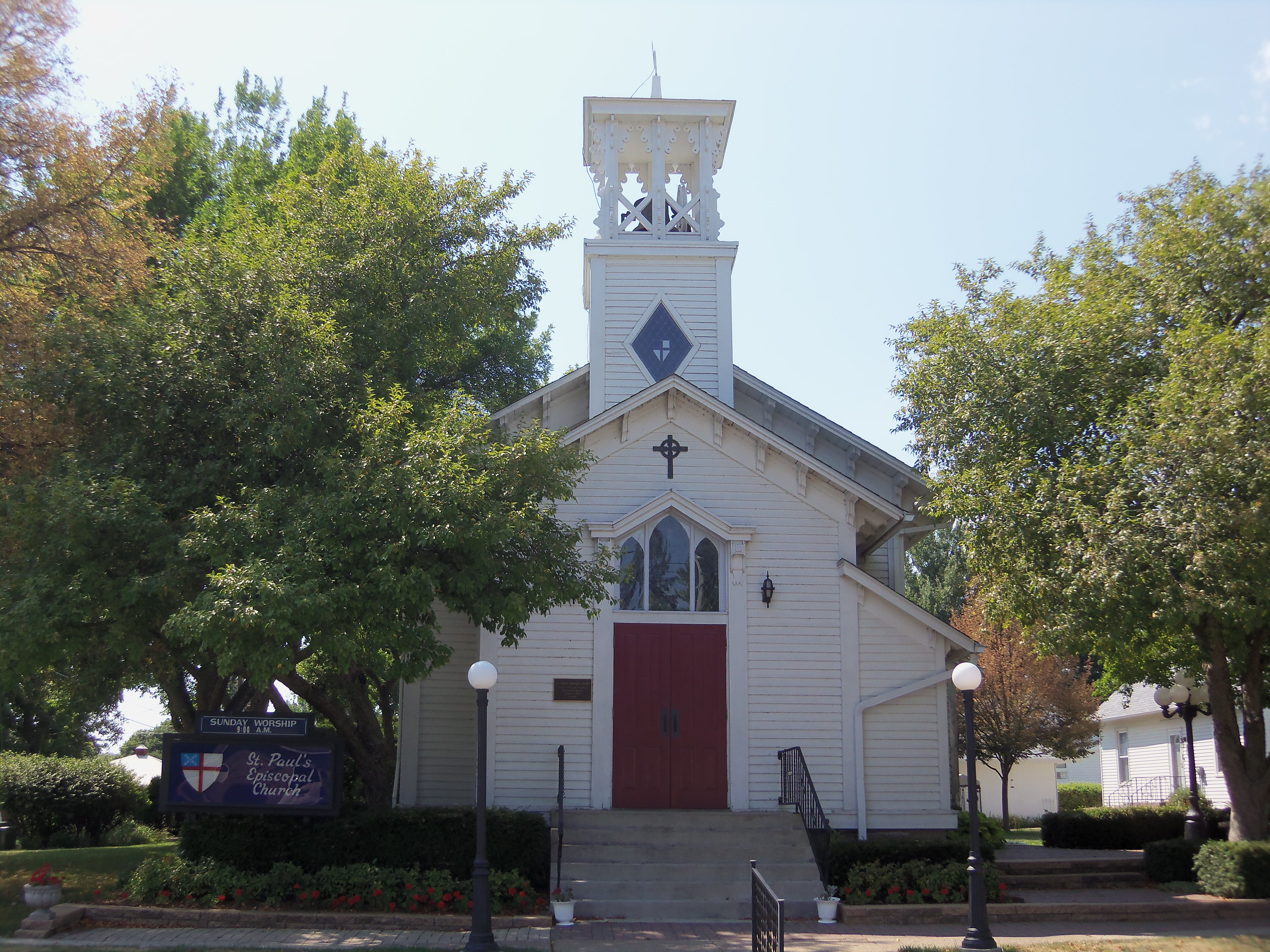

- Location within Iowa Location within the United States
- Location: 206 6th Ave. Durant, Iowa
- Coordinates: 41°35′55″N 90°54′46″W
- Area: less than one acre
- Built: 1856
- Architectural style: Italianate; Gothic Revival
- NRHP reference No.: 85000002
- Added to NRHP: January 3, 1985

St. Paul's Episcopal Church is a parish church in the Diocese of Iowa. The church is located in Durant, Iowa, United States. The church building and parish hall have been listed on the National Register of Historic Places since 1985.

== History ==
The Rt. Rev. Henry Washington Lee, the first bishop of the Episcopal Diocese of Iowa, led the first services in Durant in the Rock Island Railroad depot in 1856. Freight boxes containing champagne were used for the pulpit, altar, and pews. A meeting was held after the service to organize the parish. The name St. Paul was chosen because many of the members had belonged to St. Paul's Episcopal Church in New Haven, Connecticut before moving to Iowa. The church in Connecticut contributed $75 that began the building fund for the church.

Thomas C. Durant, the town's founder, donated land for the first church. It was located on the north side of town and was dedicated by Bishop Lee in October 1856. That same year a "seminary" for girls, or junior/senior high school, was established. In the early 1870s, the seminary curriculum was expanded to include boys and a library was built. The co-educational boarding and day school was renamed the Boardman School, after its primary benefactor. The school continued into the 1890s when Durant's public high school was established. The size of the congregation fluctuated with the local population in these same years. Because of the large number of German immigrants in Durant, services were held in the German language by 1879.

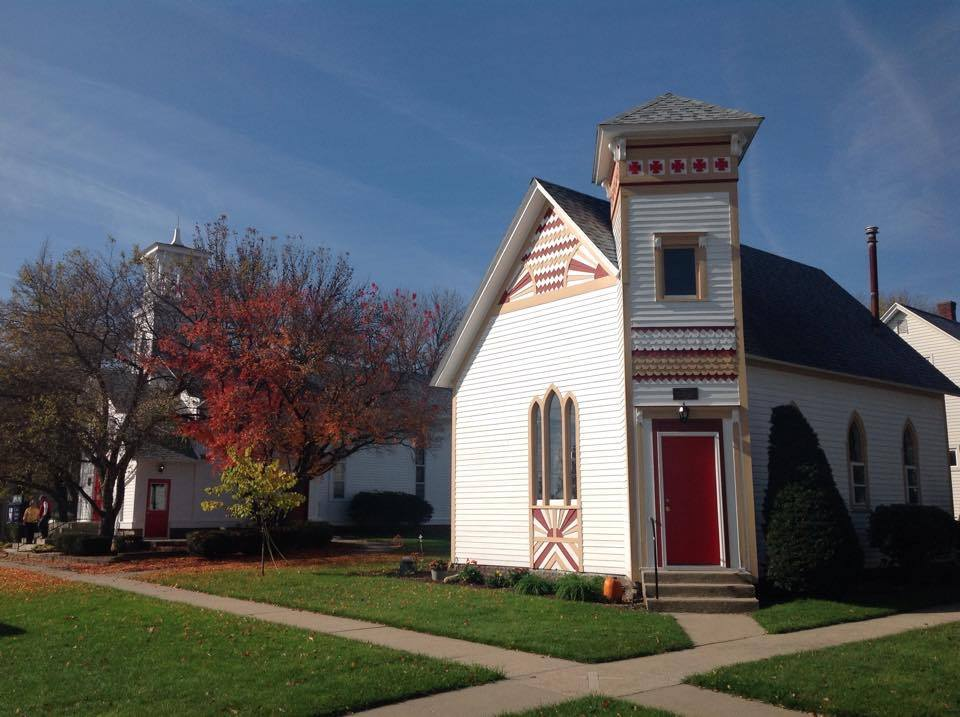
Parish Hall in 2014

By 1895 the congregation had outgrown its first building. On May 28 the original church was sold and the present building was purchased from the Congregationalists, who had built it in 1856. The bell, stained glass windows, and the furniture from the old church were moved to the new church. The chancel was added in 1895 to accommodate Episcopal worship. The parish hall was constructed next to the church by members of the congregation the same year. It has served as Sunday School building, vicar's office, town library, and town community center. It is thought the church's tower is from this same time period.

Samuel A. Dutton was instrumental in St. Paul's acquiring the church. He joined the parish after settling here from New Milford, Connecticut. Dutton was very involved in parish life through the 1870s when he was dropped from the parish roles. He joined the Congregationalist Church where he became the Sunday school superintendent and he was one of three trustees when St. Paul's acquired the church building. Dutton re-joined St. Paul's at that point and remained until around 1916 when he established a private interdenominational Sunday school in town. A large part of St. Paul's congregation left with him.

St. Paul's was unable to hold regular worship services from 1925 to 1944. During this time Gloria Dei Lutheran Church, which had been organized at this time, used the church building. In June 1944 the clergy and lay leaders from Trinity Episcopal Cathedral in Davenport restarted services. A parsonage was erected behind the church sometime between 1913 and 1948. The Rev. Vine Victor Deloria, first priest of Native American heritage to serve in the Diocese of Iowa, was vicar at St. Paul's from 1959 to 1960 after which he left the diocese. He had previously served as priest-in-charge at Trinity in Denison, Trinity Memorial in Mapleton, and St. John's in Vail.

An undercroft was added to the church in 1950. The "gingerbread gothic" steeple and belfry were restored in 1979. In 1981, the pipe organ from Trinity Cathedral was rebuilt and moved to Saint Paul's. It was later replaced for $6,000 in 1985 by the Kilgen organ, which had been built about 1879. St. Paul's achieved parish status in 2004.

== Architctecture ==
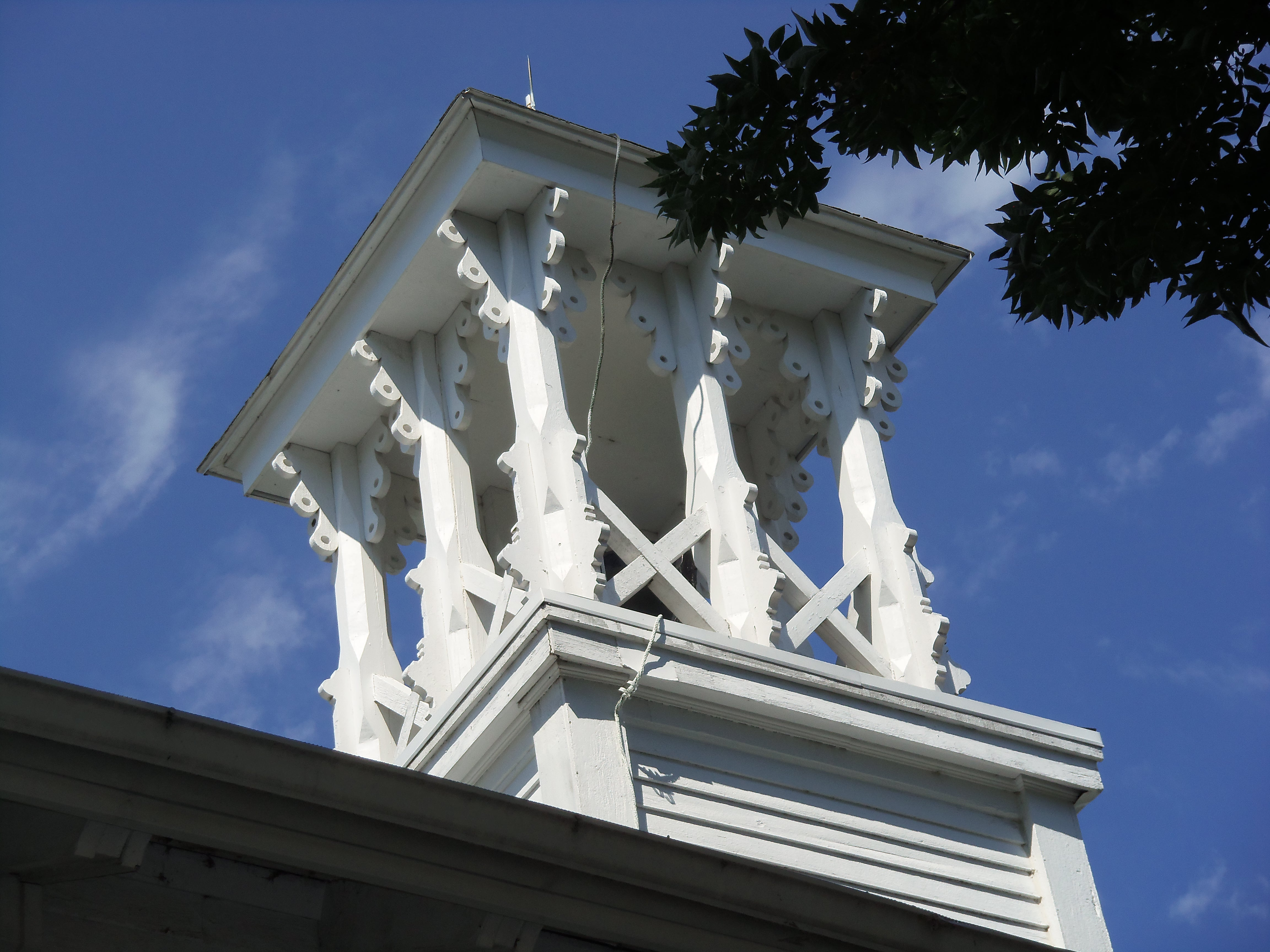
The church tower

Both the church and the parish hall are rectangular wood-frame structures built on concrete block foundations that have been simulated to appear as rusticated stone. The church's central tower is square in shape and it has a large diamond window centered on the front. The belfry is made up of eight chamfered columns with decorative gingerbread on its base and top. Located between the columns are crisscross braces that simulate a balcony effect. It is capped with a low pitched hip roof that is covered with tin. The belfry originally had a weather vane on top of it. The stained glass window above the main entrance of the church dates from 1870 and was originally a part of St. Barnabas Episcopal Church in Montrose, Iowa. It was given to St. Paul's in 1980 after St. Barnabas had been deconsecrated. Four lancet windows line the side walls.

The parish hall features a 45-degree turned corner tower and entryway. At one time it was capped with a spire. Elaborate shingling is found in the gable end, below the lancet windows on the main facade, and on the tower. A row of Maltese crosses are located at the cornice level of the tower. Three lancet windows line the side walls.
