= Lincoln School (Rock Island, Illinois) =

- Formerly listed on the U.S. National Register of Historic Places
- U.S. Historic district – Contributing property
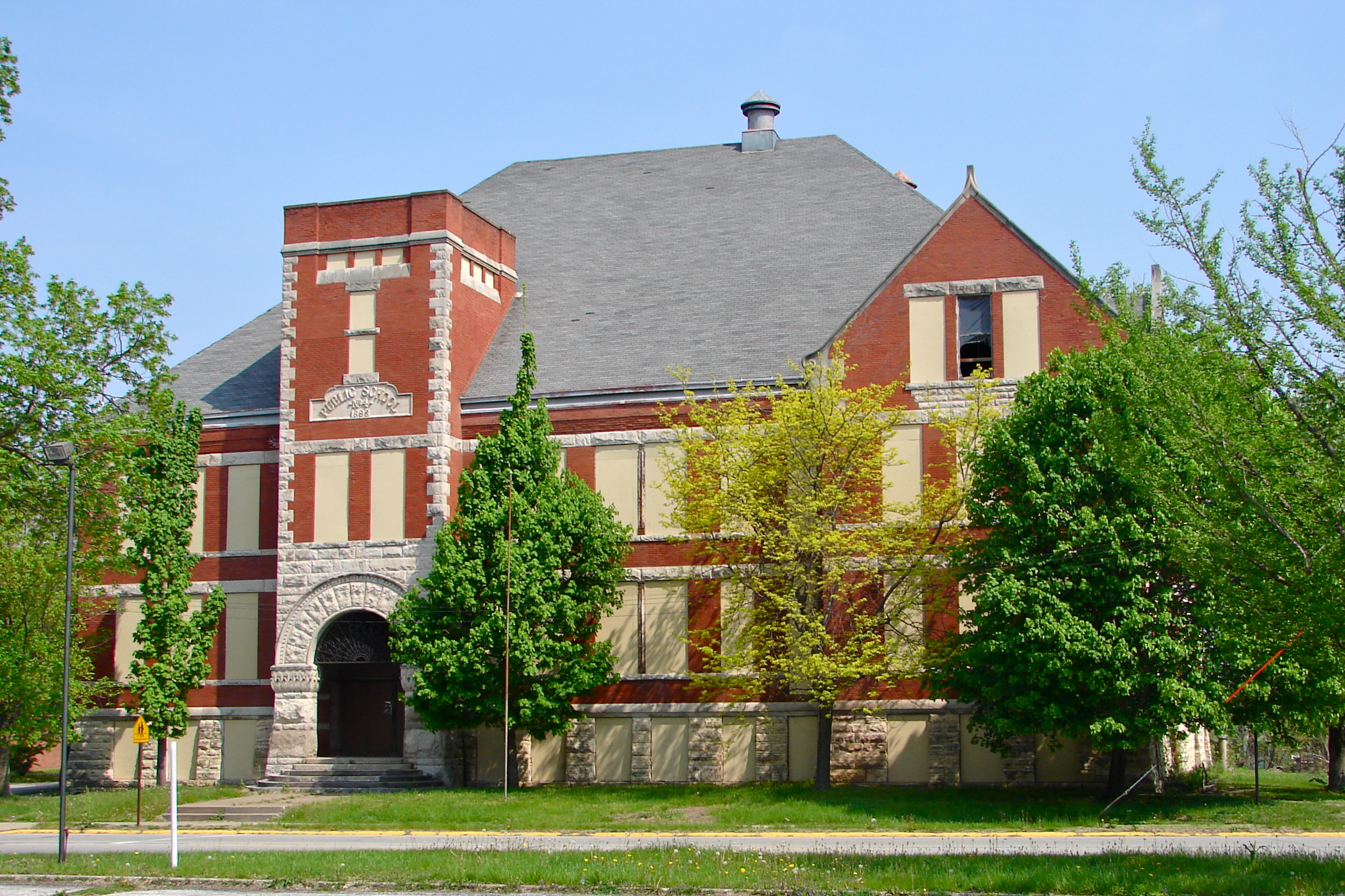

- Location within Illinois Location within the United States
- Location: 7th Ave. and 22nd St. Rock Island, Illinois
- Coordinates: 41°30′19.9″N 90°34′10.4″W
- Built: 1893
- Architect: E.S. Hammatt
- Architectural style: Romanesque
- Part of: Broadway Historic District (ID98001046)
- NRHP reference No.: 85001910

Significant dates
- Added to NRHP: August 29, 1985
- Designated CP: August 14, 1998
- Removed from NRHP: January 2, 2020

Lincoln School was a historic building located in Rock Island, Illinois, United States. It was designated a Rock Island Landmark in 1984, individually listed on the National Register of Historic Places in 1985, and became part of the Broadway Historic District when it was listed on the National Register in 1998. It was torn down in 2012 and delisted from the National Register in 2020.

== History ==
The school building, which originally housed Public School #4, was completed in July 1894. It was designed by Davenport, Iowa architect E.S. Hammatt, who had designed four other school buildings in Rock Island. He also designed school buildings for the Episcopal Diocese of Iowa in Davenport. Kemper Hall, which still stands on the Davenport Central High School campus, and multiple additions to St. Katherine's Hall were also his work. He was also the architect for the Connor House in Rock Island. Lincoln School was constructed by John Volk and Company.

Mary Platt, who taught ninth grade, was named the school's first principal. Shortly after that ninth grade was moved to Rock Island High School. Seventh and eighth grades remained at Lincoln until 1937. The school operated as an elementary school until 1980. It was scheduled for demolition in 1984 when it was given its landmark status. A neighbor who was interested in saving the building bought the old school. It remained vacant and was named one of 2005's Ten Most Endangered Historic Places in Illinois by the preservation advocacy group Landmarks Illinois.

By order of the City Council, the building was slated to be torn down on July 1, 2012, unless an organization could save it before then. The City voted to place a tarp over the leaking roof to allow for some of the building to be salvaged, but this was never completed. The building was torn down in August 2012.

== Architecture ==
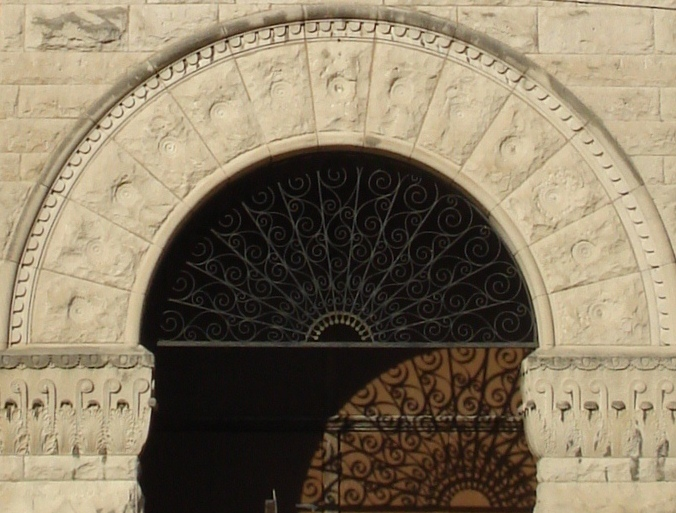
Archway in main entry featuring wrought-iron scrollwork

The building was designed in the Richardsonian Romanesque style. The exterior, which was composed of red brick and Anamosa Limestone and Bedford limestone, featured simple and bold massing. A flared and rusticated limestone base reinforced the visual weightiness of the building. A bell tower was constructed in brick on the front of the building and was removed in the 1940s. It featured stone quoining. A recessed entry was located below an archway that featured wrought-iron scrollwork.

The exterior of the school was simple and bold in massing. The hipped roof rose 41 feet (12 m) at the ridgeline and included cross gables on three sides of the building. A flared and rusticated limestone base reinforces the visual weightiness of the building.

The building's interior was noteworthy for its expansive hallways, which also housed the school's library. It also featured a grand staircase between floors.
