= Renwick House =

Renwick House may refer to:

- Renwick House (Davenport, Iowa), a NRHP-listed house in Davenport, Iowa
- Helen Goodwin Renwick House, a NRHP-listed house at Pomona College in Claremont, California
