= Edward Edinger House =

Historic house in Iowa, United States

- U.S. National Register of Historic Places
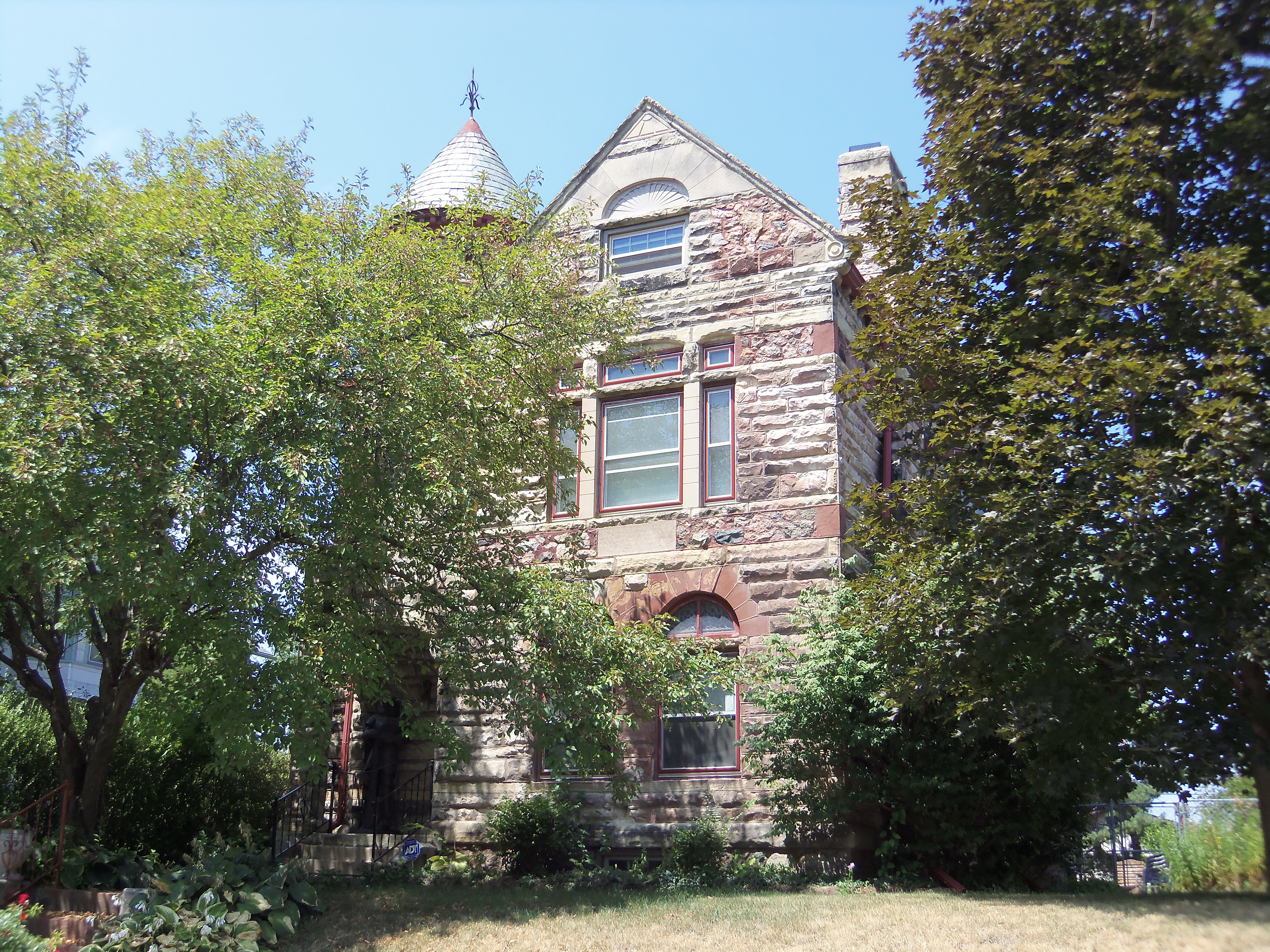

- Location within Iowa Location within the United States
- Location: 1623 W. 6th St. Davenport, Iowa
- Coordinates: 41°31′31″N 90°35′58″W
- Area: less than one acre
- Built: 1890
- Architect: Edward S. Hammatt
- Architectural style: Late Victorian
- MPS: Davenport MRA
- NRHP reference No.: 83002424
- Added to NRHP: July 27, 1984

The Edward Edinger House is a historic building located in the West End of Davenport, Iowa, United States. It has been listed on the National Register of Historic Places since 1984.

== History ==
This late Victorian home was designed by Edward Hammatt who had designed several buildings for the Episcopal Diocese of Iowa. In Davenport these buildings include a classroom-dormitory building at St. Katherine's Hall, Sheldon Hall, and Kemper Hall, which is still on the property of Davenport Central High School in the College Square Historic District. Edward Edinger, who had this house built, was a stonemason.

== Architecture ==
The Edinger House is a 2½-story structure that follows an irregular plan in a generalized medieval style. It features a corner tower with a conical roof in one the angles in the front of the house. The dominant feature of this structure is its masonry. The walls are composed of ashlar brownstone, laid in a random pattern. A lighter colored stone was used for the belt coursing. The second floor is framed with rubble stone, and it is also found on the gable ends. Edinger's stone business may have contributed to the idiosyncratic nature of the house's design.
