= College Square Historic District =

Historic district in Iowa, United States

- U.S. National Register of Historic Places
- U.S. Historic district
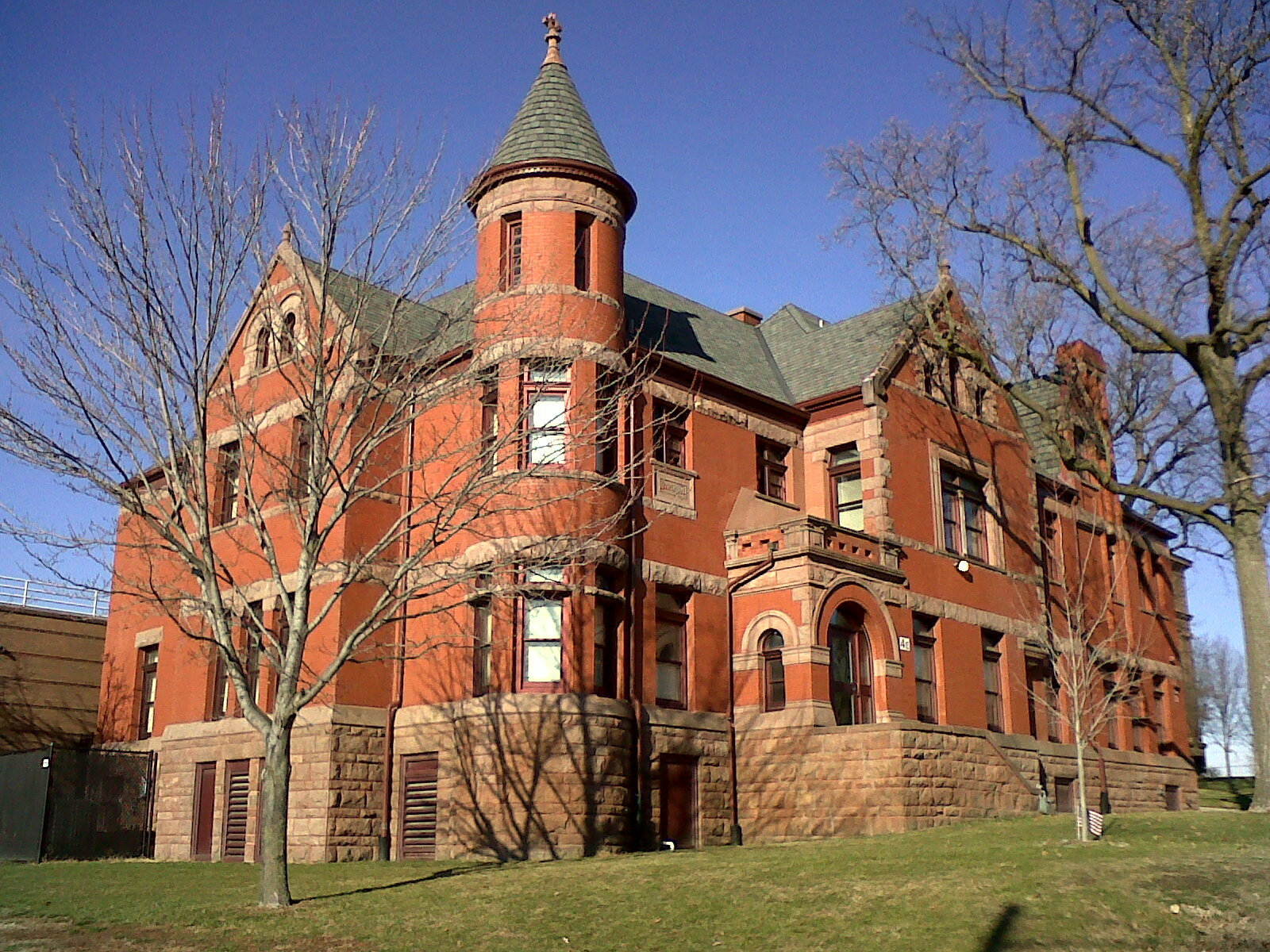
- Kemper Hall

- Location within Iowa Location within the United States
- Location: Roughly bounded by Brady, Main, Harrison, 11th, and 15th Sts., Davenport, Iowa
- Coordinates: 41°31′56″N 90°34′33″W
- Area: 31 acres (13 ha)
- Architect: Multiple
- Architectural style: Late Victorian
- MPS: Davenport MRA
- NRHP reference No.: 83003628
- Added to NRHP: November 18, 1983

College Square Historic District is a nationally recognized historic district located on a bluff north of downtown Davenport, Iowa, United States. It was listed on the National Register of Historic Places in 1983. The district derives it name from two different colleges that were located here in the 19th century.

== History ==
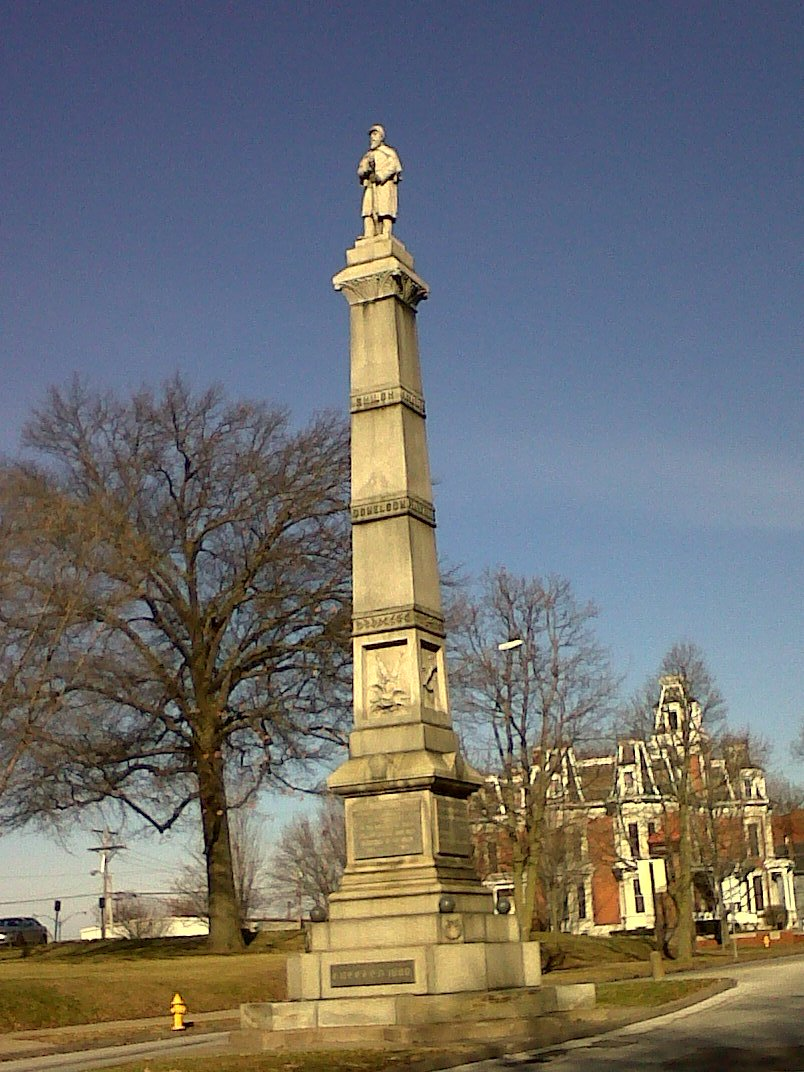
Civil War Monument

Iowa College was founded in 1846 by members of the Congregational Church on Western Avenue in Davenport. The land was donated by Antoine LeClaire, one of the city's founders. The school started as a college preparatory school and eventually added a collegiate department. The city decided to extend Western Avenue through the campus so the school moved further east in 1855 to where Central High School is now located. It was at that time that the property was first called College Square. That year they built a new stone building and boarding house for $22,000. Once again the city council voted to extend Main Street through the campus and in 1858 the trustees decided to move to Grinnell, Iowa in 1859 where the school was renamed Grinnell College.

The following year the school property was purchased by Henry Washington Lee, the first bishop of the Episcopal Diocese of Iowa for $36,000. He established Griswold College on the west side of the property. It too contained preparatory and collegiate divisions as well as a seminary department. The college started well at the beginning, but began to have financial problems as a result of the Panic of 1873 and started to decline. Kemper Hall, a college preparatory school for boys, was founded on the property. By the end of the 19th century, the schools were officially closed by the diocese. On the east side of the property, Bishop Lee built Grace Cathedral, which is now known as Trinity Episcopal Cathedral.

The diocese sold the property on the west side of Main Street to the Davenport Board of Education for $53,000. They built Davenport High School on the property between 1904 and 1907. The north part of the district is largely occupied by houses that were built largely in the two decades following the American Civil War. In the middle of the district is the city's Civil War soldier's monument. Also adjacent to the historic district is Palmer College of Chiropractic.

The College Square Historic District is part of the larger Hilltop Neighborhood. In 2010 community planners held workshops and other meetings to revitalize the area. They are focused on the commercial district on Harrison Street, which just to the west of the historic district, as well as infill housing in the residential sections.

== Trinity Episcopal Cathedral ==
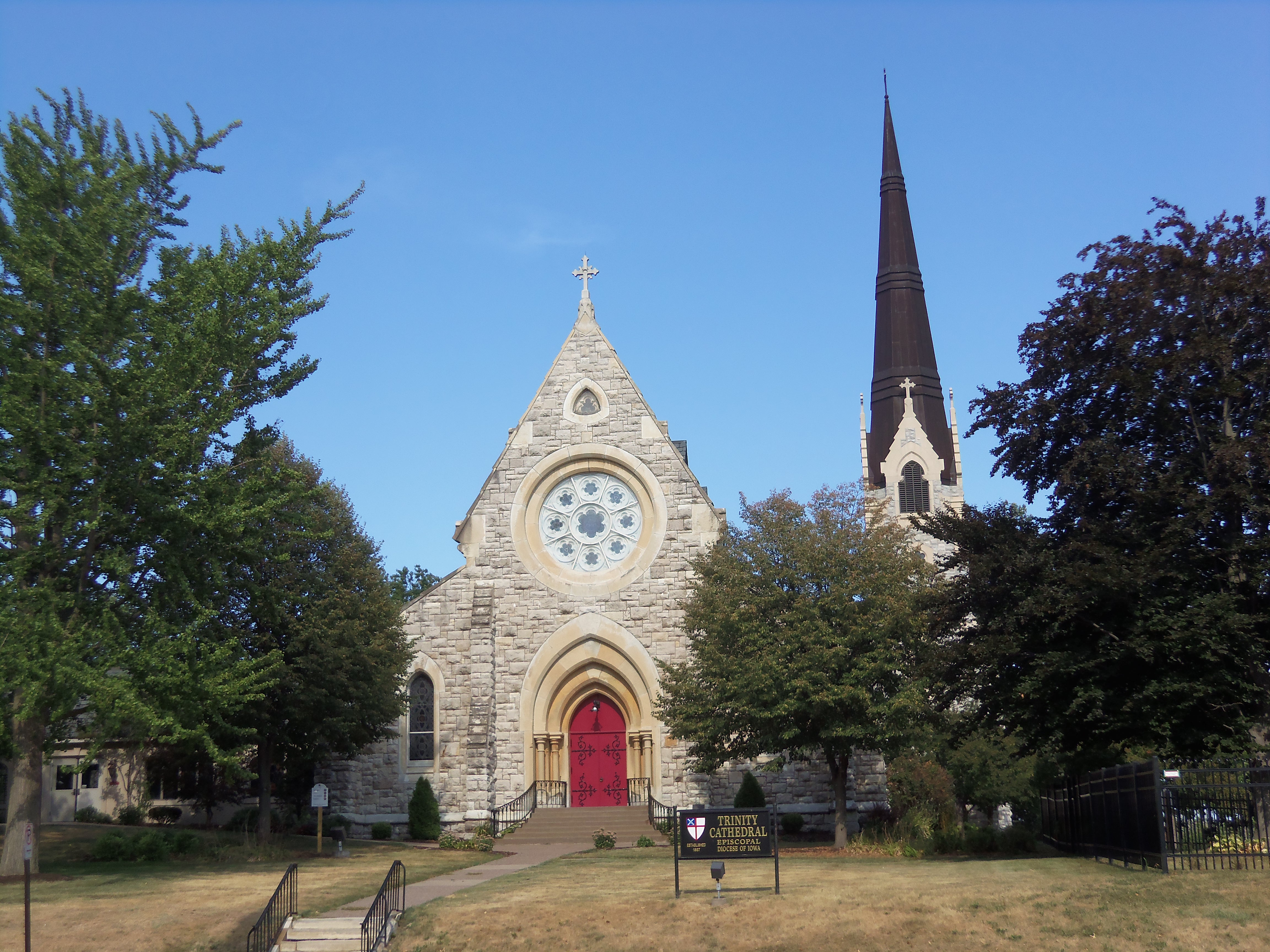
Trinity Episcopal Cathedral

The cornerstone for the cathedral was laid in 1867 and it was completed in 1873, except for its bell tower and spire. The church was designed by New York City architect Edward Tuckerman Potter and was completed for $80,000. It was only the second Episcopal Church in the United States built exclusively as a cathedral. The attached parish house was completed in 1993, replacing an older building, and the bell tower and spire were completed in 1998 after Potter's original design. The cross on top of the spire reaches 131 feet (40 m) above the ground. On the south side of the cathedral is the dean's house. The buildings are harmonious in appearance, scale, and materials. They are all masonry buildings, grey-tan in color and follow the cathedral's Gothic Revival style.

The cathedral complex had another building that was a contributing property in the historic district, but it has subsequently been torn down. Davenport architect John W. Ross designed the two-story, brick, Gothic Revival, Ely House (1881). Caroline D. Ely of New York paid for its construction, and its use was intended as the residence for the holder of a theological chair at Griswold College. The chair had been endowed by her late husband, David J. Ely, and the house was named in his memory.

== Central High School ==
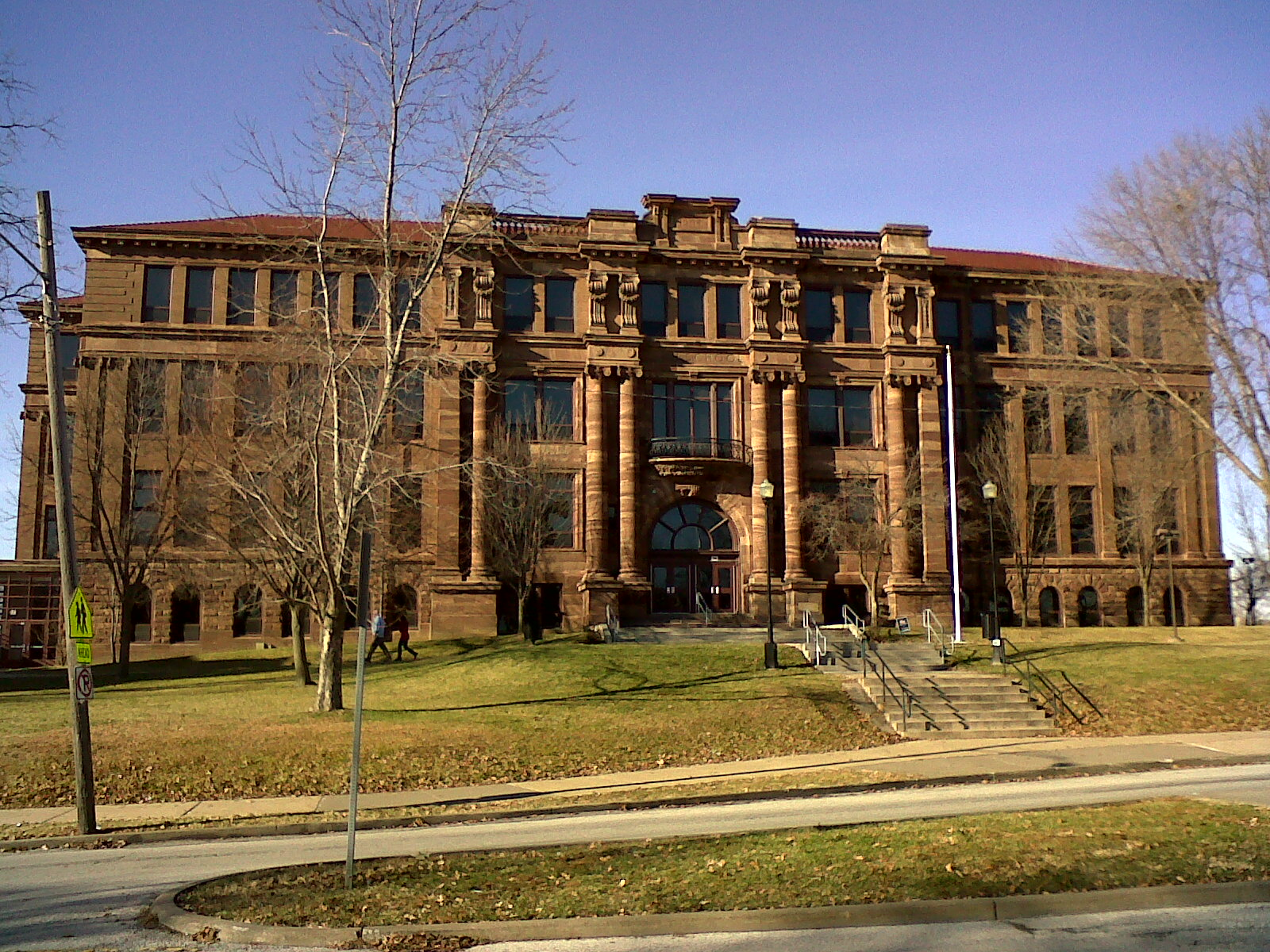
Central High School

Davenport Central High School sits directly across Main Street from Trinity Cathedral. Its building's darker coloring create a contrast with those of the cathedral complex, which are lighter in color. The school at one time was a multi-building complex. The main building of the high school was completed in 1907. It was designed by Parke Burrows in the Beaux Arts style and was built in dark red brick. The building is a square plan with a stone basement and hipped roof. On both the Main Street and Harrison Street sides of the building are single round-arched entrances that are framed with Ionic columns. Several additions have been made to the building over the years.

In front of the main school building sits the former Kemper Hall. It was designed by Edward S. Hammatt who also designed the buildings for Griswold College and St. Katherine's Hall, the Episcopal girls' school on the east side of Davenport. He utilized a Victorian Romanesque Revival style that was built in dark red brick and red-brown sandstone for the foundation and details. There is a round tower on the southeast corner of the building with a stylized cross on the top of the spire-shaped roof.

Before World War I an industrial arts building was built on the campus. It was a side-gable brick building in the Colonial Revival style. The building was illuminated by large multi-paned steel windows that were similar to those used in factories of the era. It has subsequently been torn down.

== Civil War Monument ==
Between the cathedral and the high school sits the Civil War Soldier's monument in the middle of Main Street. The monument is a stone obelisk topped by a statue of a soldier, which faces south towards the Mississippi River in the valley below. Battles in which local soldiers fought are engraved on each side of the obelisk in two rows. The battles listed are: Shilo, Donelson, Wilsons Creek, Fort Blakeley, Corinth, Prairie Grove, and Vicksburg. It was built in 1880, and listed on the Davenport Register of Historic Properties in 1993.

== Residential Neighborhood ==
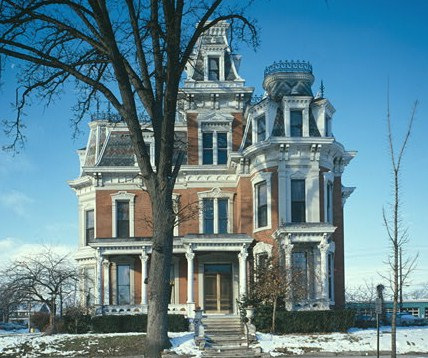
Parker-Ficke House

The residential section of the district is a four-block area north of the high school and cathedral complexes. Most of the houses are fairly large in size and reflect various architectural styles. Some of the styles include Second Empire, Queen Anne, Greek Revival, American Craftsman, and Colonial Revival. The most dramatic residence is the Parker-Ficke House on Main Street, across Twelfth Street from Central High School. It is considered one of the finest examples of Second Empire construction in the state of Iowa. Built in 1881, the house features a mansard roof, multicolor slate shingles, wrought-iron roof cresting, brackets, moldings, and fanciful window surrounds. Today the building serves as a fraternity house for Palmer College. It was listed on the Davenport Register of Historic Properties in 2003. The neighborhood at one time included the former St. Paul's English Lutheran Church. The Gothic Revival structure that was individually listed on the National Register of Historic Places has since been torn down.

In addition to the institutional buildings, several houses were also designed by local architects and builders. However, none of the commissions are considered their best work. They include T.W. McClelland (Parker-Ficke House and 133 West 13th Street), G.A. Hanssen (G.A. Koester House), and Edward S. Hammatt who designed a house for himself on West 13th Street.
