= St. Thomas Episcopal Church (Sioux City, Iowa) =

- U.S. National Register of Historic Places
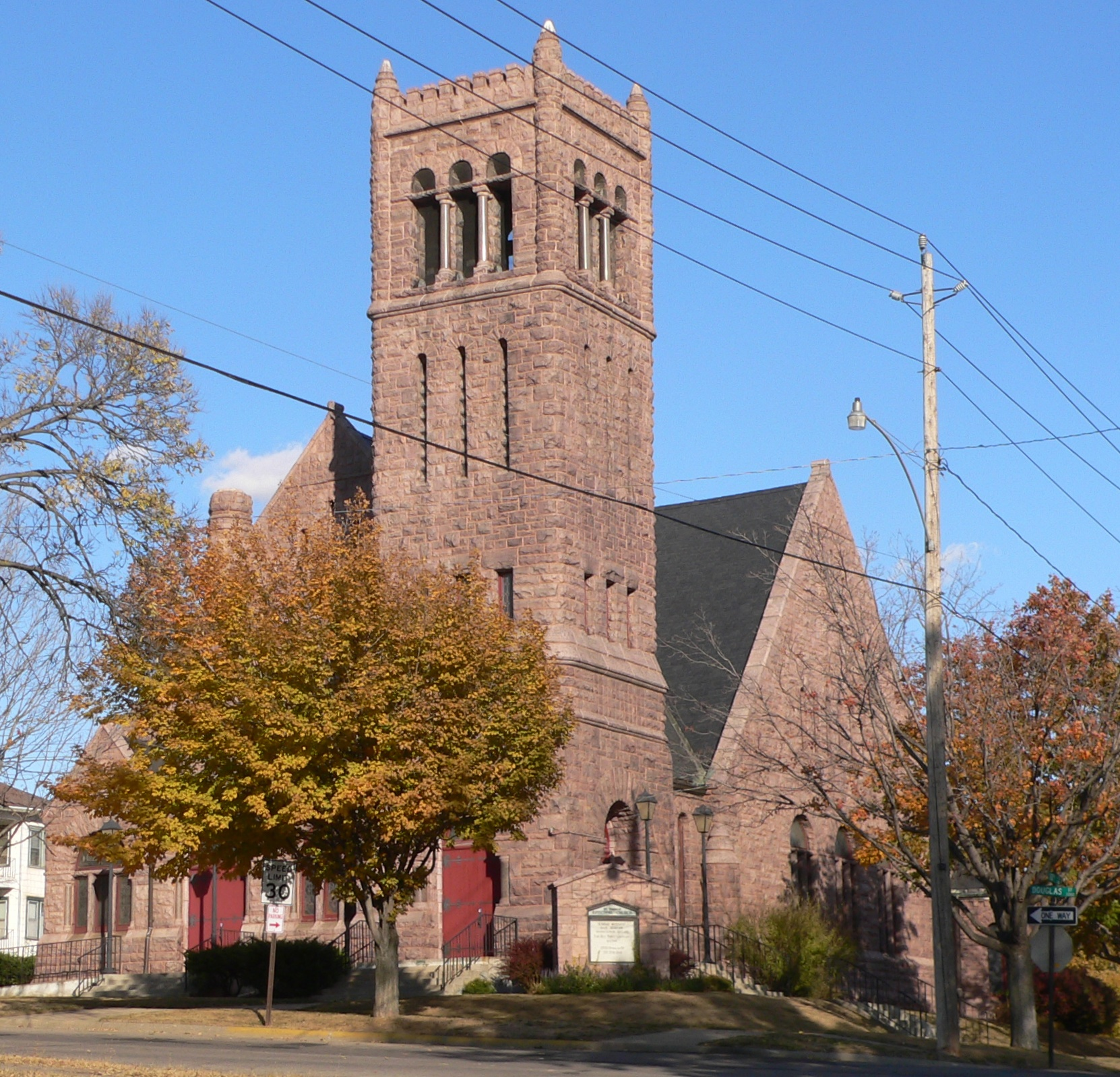
- View from the southwest, across 12th and Douglas

- Location within Iowa Location within the United States
- Location: 1200 Douglas St. Sioux City, Iowa
- Coordinates: 42°30′11″N 96°24′23″W
- Area: less than one acre
- Built: 1892
- Built by: John M. Poorbaugh
- Architect: James W. Martin
- Architectural style: Romanesque Revival
- NRHP reference No.: 84001612
- Added to NRHP: September 27, 1984

St. Thomas Episcopal Church is a parish church in the Episcopal Diocese of Iowa. The church is located in Sioux City, Iowa, United States. The church building was listed on the National Register of Historic Places in 1984.

In 2019, the church reported 79 members; in 2023, it reported 155 members. No membership statistics were reported in 2024 national parochial reports. Plate and pledge financial support reported by the church in 2024 was $90,290. Average Sunday Attendance (ASA) reported in 2024 was 87 persons. This was a relative increase from ASA of 49 persons reported in 2015.

== History ==
The first Episcopal Church service in Sioux City was conducted by a missionary from Council Bluffs, Iowa in 1857. St. Thomas Church was established two years later. A small frame church was built for the congregation on the corner of Nebraska and 7th Streets in 1860 for $1,550. By 1881 it became necessary to add onto the church, and a rectory was built at the same time. A pipe organ was purchased for the same price that the original church was built.

The cornerstone for the present church was laid in 1891. The church was designed in the Romanesque Revival style by local architect James W. Martin. John M. Poorbaugh was the contractor. It is considered an excellent example of the Richardsonian Romanesque mode. The building was completed in 1892 and cost about $80,000 to build. The stained glass windows from the old church were removed before the building was torn down. They were donated in 1893 to Trinity Memorial Episcopal Church in Mapleton, Iowa and were placed in their new church built in 1896. A new pipe organ was purchased in 1909 and the Weare Chapel was added at the same time.

In 1922 a fire from an overheated furnace caused extensive damage to the church. The building had to be rebuilt and a new organ was purchased. The church was redecorated again in 1951.

In the early 1960s, the Parish House was built and the parish acquired a new rectory. Weare Chapel was restored in 1980 under the direction of Howard Tervillian, who was Architect in Residence for the Washington National Cathedral, in Washington, D.C. Another renovation of the church occurred in 1982.

== Architecture ==
The 120 by 67 feet (37 by 20 m) structure is generally rectangular in plan. It is influenced by a later phase of Henry Hobson Richardson's design evolution in its more simplified cubic form. Its exterior is clad in rose-colored Sioux Quartzite was laid using in a broken ashlar technique. The broad slate cruciform roof-plan gives the building a monumental feel. The four-story Norman style corner tower rises to a height of 78 feet (24 m). The two-story Weare Chapel projects slightly from the main building on its northeast corner. The interior features a steeply pitched hammer beam birch ceiling, wainscoting, and a large Gothic arch at the chancel opening. The interior is a restored version of its original after the 1922 fire.
