= Edward Hammatt =

American architect

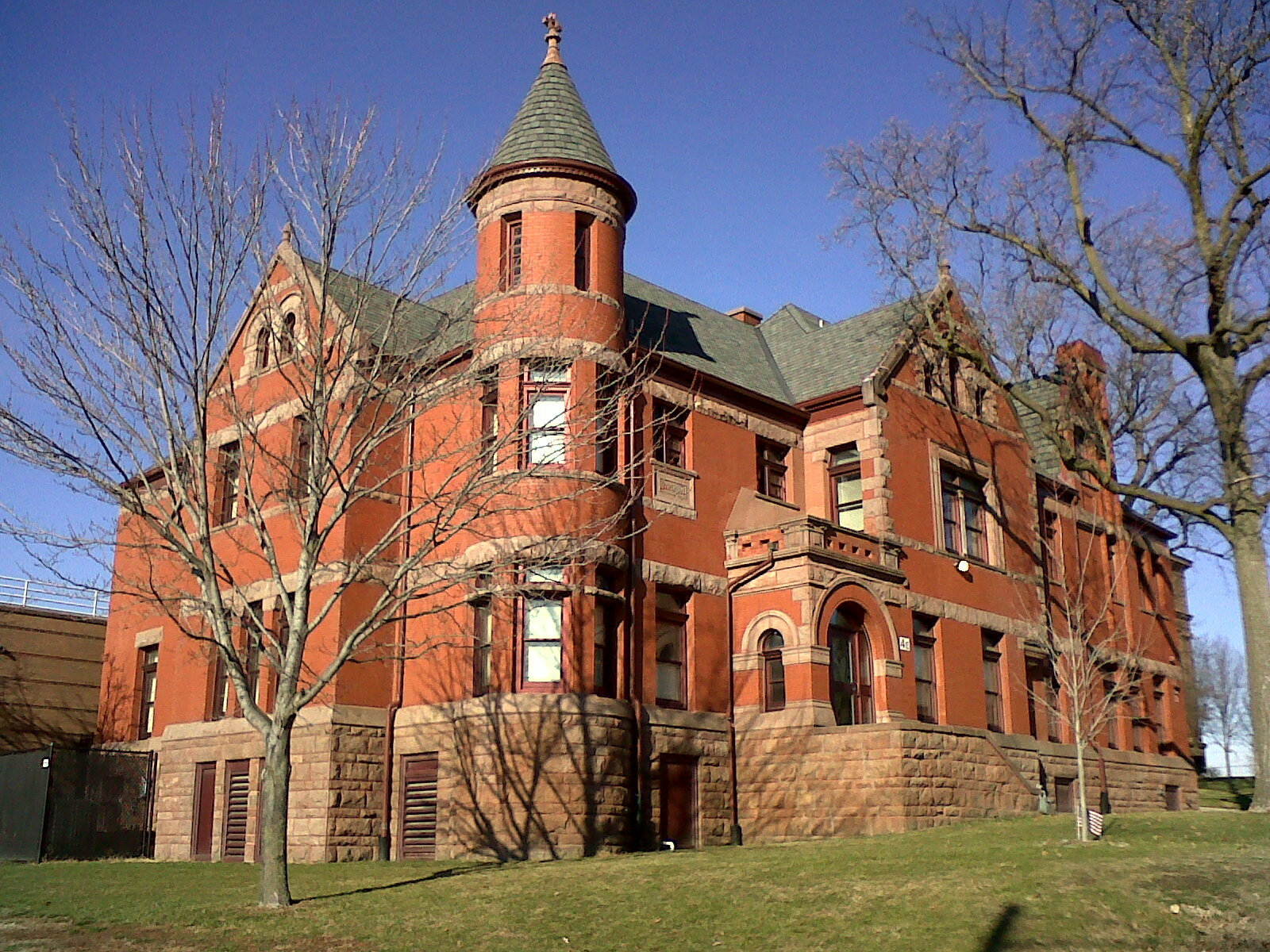
Kemper Hall (1885)

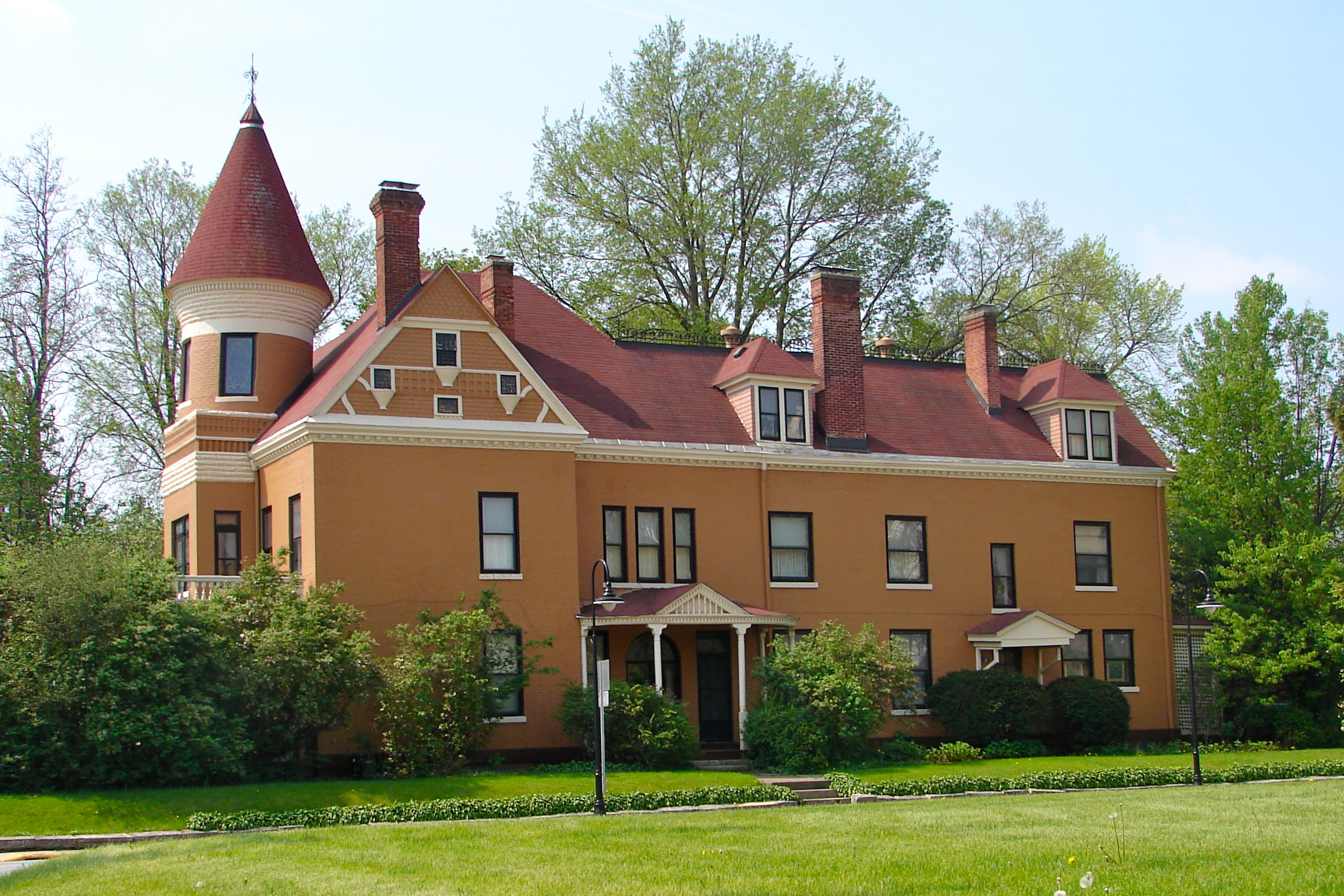
Connor House (1888)

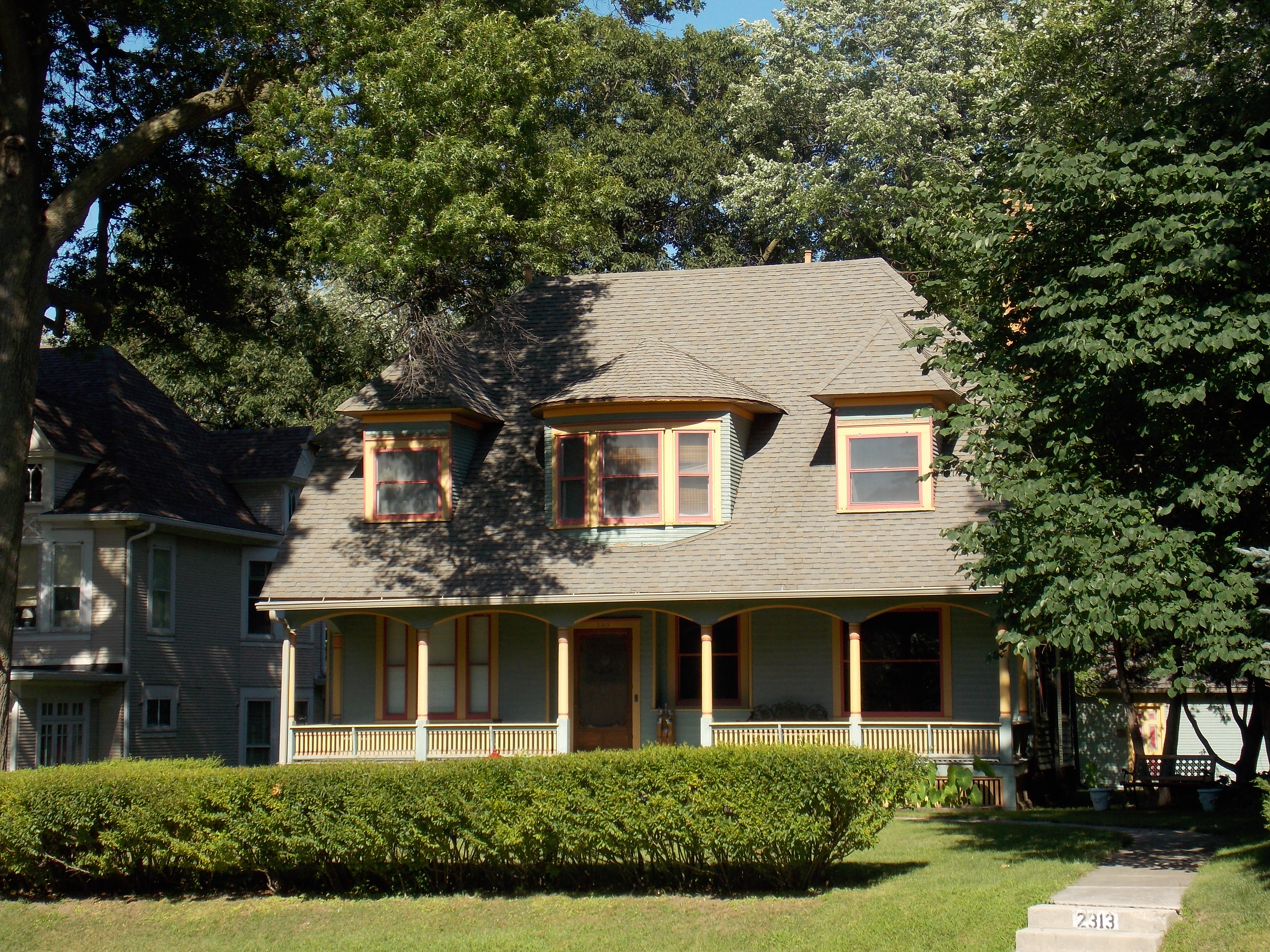
Edward S. Hammatt House (1896)

Edward Hammatt (September 8, 1856 – August 24, 1907) was an architect in the United States. He designed several notable buildings that are listed on the National Register of Historic Places.

== Biography ==
Edward Seymour Hammatt was born in Geneseo, New York. His family moved to Rochester, New York, where he was educated. He graduated from Lehigh University and the Massachusetts Institute of Technology, and then spent four years working for Ware & Van Brunt in Boston. He spent a further four years with the New York firm of Hardenbergh & Le Brun. He was also associated with John B. Snook. Hammett opened his own office in Davenport, Iowa, in 1883, where he worked until a few months before his death. His notable buildings include schools, business, and residential buildings and churches for the Episcopal Diocese of Iowa. In 1884 he was elected to membership in the Western Association of Architects. He became a Fellow of the American Institute of Architects in 1889 after the groups consolidated.

== Notable designs ==
The following buildings and one object are listed on the National Register of Historic Places:

- Trinity Episcopal Church, Davenport, Iowa (1874; no longer extant)
- Kemper Hall, a contributing property in the College Square Historic District, Davenport, Iowa (1885)
- One or more buildings in the St. Katherine's Historic District, Davenport, Iowa (1885, 1886)
- Connor House, Rock Island, Illinois (1888)
- Edward Edinger House, Davenport, Iowa (1890)
- Lincoln School, Rock Island, Illinois (1893)
- Old Main, Augustana College, Rock Island, Illinois (1893; with L.G. Hallberg)
- Entrance gates at Oakdale Memorial Gardens, a contributing object in the Oakdale Cemetery Historic District, Davenport, Iowa (1895)
- Trinity Episcopal Church, Ottumwa, Iowa, a contributing property in the Fifth Street Bluff Historic District (1895)
- Trinity Memorial Episcopal Church, Mapleton, Iowa (1896)
- Edward S. Hammatt House, a contributing property in the Vander Veer Park Historic District, Davenport, Iowa (1896)
- M.J. Eagal Block (1901); Winecke Block (1901), contributing properties in the Davenport Downtown Commercial Historic District, Davenport, Iowa
