= Old Main, Augustana College =

- U.S. National Register of Historic Places
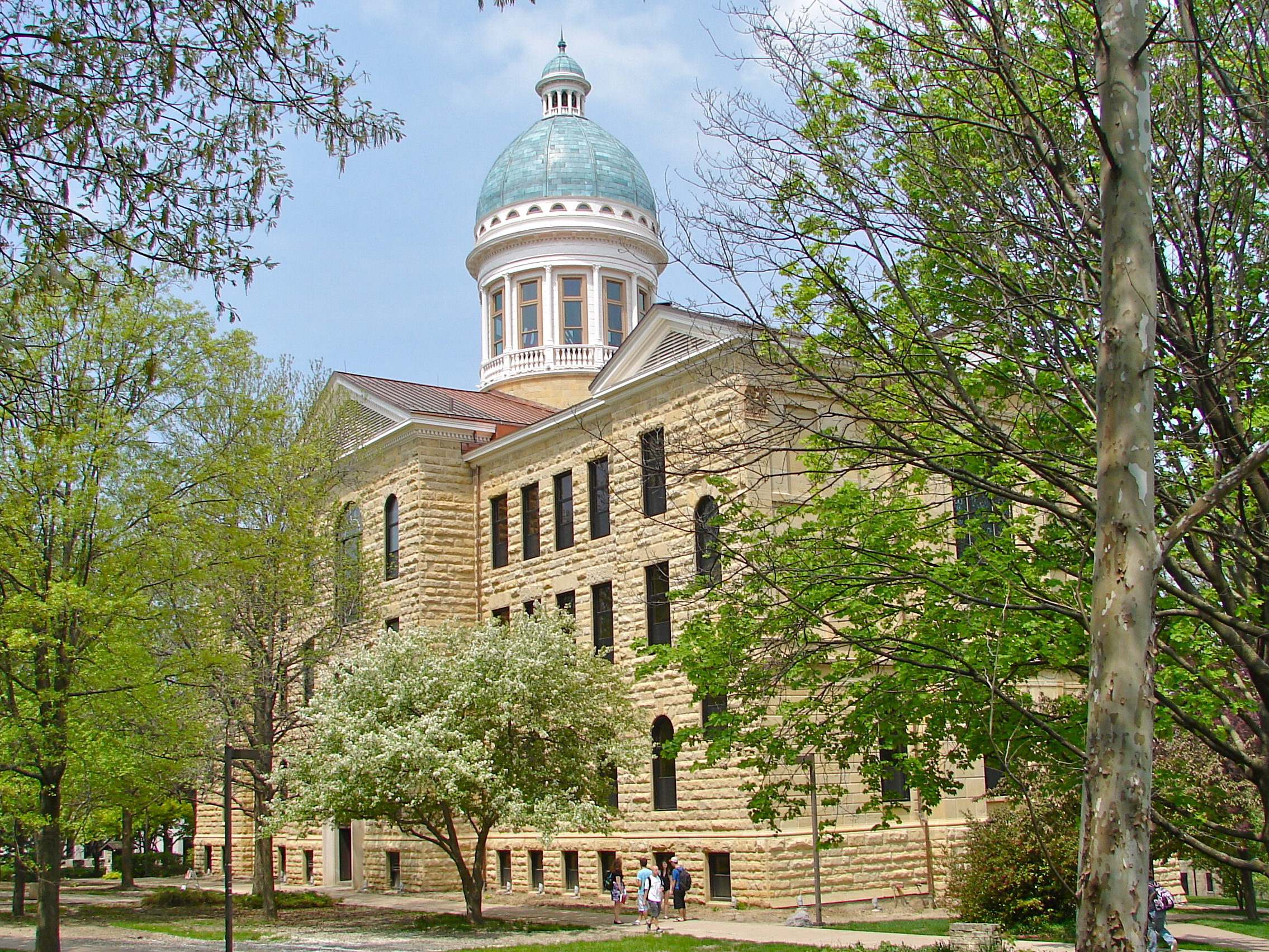

- Location within Illinois Location within the United States
- Location: 7th Ave. between 35th and 38th Sts., Rock Island, Illinois
- Coordinates: 41°30′16″N 90°32′58″W
- Area: less than one acre
- Built: 1884-1893
- Architect: L.G. Hallberg
- Architectural style: Renaissance Revival
- NRHP reference No.: 75000673
- Added to NRHP: September 11, 1975

Old Main, Augustana College is a historic building located in Rock Island, Illinois, United States. It was built between 1884 and 1893 on the campus of Augustana College, and it was listed on the National Register of Historic Places in 1975.

== History ==
Augustana College was established in Chicago in 1860 to educate Swedish immigrants by the Scandinavian Evangelical Lutheran Augustana Synod, now part of the Evangelical Lutheran Church in America. The school moved to Paxton, Illinois in 1863 and then to Rock Island in 1875.

Old Main was constructed from 1884 to 1893. It was dedicated as Memorial Hall in 1889 although it was still incomplete. The building's design was based on a similar building at the University of Uppsala in Sweden, which was the alma mater of many of the college's early faculty. The dome, however, was not part of the building's original design. The building in Uppsala features a crenelated octagon-shaped tower. A dome was believed to be more American, and so it was chosen to top the building. The original cost to build the building is estimated at $75,000. A third of the money was donated by a local industrialist, Philander Lathrop Cable. Cable Hall, on the second floor of the building, was restored to look like a 19th-century classroom.

A $13 million renovation of the building was begun in July 2010. The stone on the building's exterior was washed and tuck pointed, and the old windows were replaced. The building's dome, which was painted metal, was covered in a copper that has a pre-treated patina to give a weathered, bluish-green look.

== Architecture ==
The Renaissance Revival-style building was designed by L.G. Hallberg of Chicago and E.S. Hammatt of Davenport. A large central pediment with four two-story pilasters dominate in main façade of the building over the main entrance. Smaller pediments flank the ends of the façade and help to give the structure a balanced appearance. The exterior walls feature heavy textured stone on the ground level and smooth masonry walls on the second and third levels of the building. The buff-colored dolomite limestone was quarried near LeClaire, Iowa. It is the same quarry that produced the stone blocks that were used to build the shops on nearby Rock Island Arsenal. The dome on top of the building is based on 16th-century Italian designs.
