= William Stevens Perry =

American bishop

The Right Reverend William Stevens Perry
- Bishop of Iowa
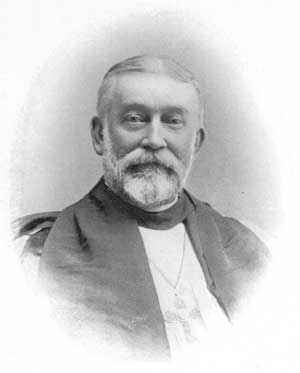
- Church: Episcopal Church
- See: Iowa
- Elected: June 21, 1876
- In office: 1876–1898
- Predecessor: Henry Washington Lee
- Successor: Theodore Nevin Morrison

Orders
- Ordination: April 7, 1858 by Manton Eastburn
- Consecration: September 10, 1876 by William Bacon Stevens

Personal details
- Born: January 22, 1832 Providence, Rhode Island, United States
- Died: May 13, 1898 (aged 66) Dubuque, Iowa, United States
- Buried: Church of St. James the Less
- Denomination: Anglican
- Parents: Stephen Perry & Katharine Whittemore Stevens
- Spouse: Sara Abbot Wood Smith (m. 1862)
- Education: Harvard College

William Stevens Perry (January 22, 1832 – May 13, 1898) was a 19th-century bishop of the Protestant Episcopal Church in the United States of America and an educator. He served as the second bishop of the Diocese of Iowa from 1876 to 1898.

== Biography ==
=== Early life and ministry ===
He was born at Providence, Rhode Island, studied at Brown University, but took his degree from Harvard in 1854. He studied theology at Virginia Theological Seminary before finishing his studies privately. He was ordained a deacon at Grace Church in Newton, Massachusetts, and a priest (1858) at St. Paul's, Boston, where he spent the first year of his ministry. His succeeding charges were in St. Luke's Church Nashua, New Hampshire, St. Stephen's Church Portland, Maine, St. Michael's Church Litchfield, Connecticut, and Trinity Church Geneva, New York.

He taught history at Hobart College for several years and served the institution as president from April to September, 1876, when he was consecrated Bishop of Iowa.

=== Bishop of Iowa ===
He did much for the cause of education in his diocese—reopened Griswold College, founded St. Katharine's Hall for girls, Kemper Hall for boys, and Lee Hall for training candidates for orders. Several other schools were founded throughout the diocese. Some of the schools were parish based while others were sponsored by the diocese.

Bishop Perry reformed the vestries in the diocese, and reduced the number parishes by removing the ones that did not function on a regular basis, if at all. Grace Cathedral had been completed by his predecessor, Bishop Henry Washington Lee, but it was up to Perry to establish the administration. He named the Very Rev. Willis H. Barris as dean and a chapter based on the English model. He gave a report on the model at the Anglican Congress in London while he attended the Lambeth Conference.

In the 1884 Diocesan Convention, Bishop Perry proposed goals that embraced the Social Gospel Movement that was popular at the time. As a result, three hospitals were founded during his episcopate: Cottage Hospital in Des Moines, St. Luke's Hospital in Cedar Rapids and St. Luke's Hospital in Davenport. A Home for the Friendless, supported by J.M. Griffith, was begun in Dubuque and a Home for the Friendless was also begun in Davenport by Clarissa C. Cook.

In 1862 he became the Assistant Secretary of the General Convention and became Secretary in 1868. He attended the Third Lambeth Conference in 1888 and the Fourth in 1897.

He was a hereditary member of the Rhode Island Society of the Cincinnati, a founding member of The Sons of the Revolution in Iowa, and also a member of the Massachusetts Commandery of the Naval Order of the United States. He was also a member of the Masonic Brotherhood

=== Later life and death ===
Bishop Perry was in poor health during the latter part of his life and took several trips to Europe to recuperate. While he was on visitation to Northeast Iowa, Bishop Perry suffered a paralytic stroke on May 12, 1898, and died the following day. His funeral was held in St. John's Church in Dubuque and he was buried in the churchyard of the Church of St. James the Less in Philadelphia, Pennsylvania.

== Honors ==
Perry received several honorary degrees. In 1869 he received a Doctor of Sacred Theology from Trinity College in Dublin, and the College of William and Mary awarded him a Doctor of Laws in 1876. He was elected a member of the American Antiquarian Society in 1882. Oxford University awarded him a Doctor of Divinity in 1888 when he was in England for the Lambeth Conference. He was made an Honorary Chaplain of the Venerable Order of St John in England on 9 May 1898.

== Writings ==
Among his writings are:

- Documentary History of the Protestant Episcopal Church in the United States of America (1863–1864), with Dr. F. L. Hawks
- Historical Collections of the American Colonial Church (five volumes, 1871–1878)
- Historical Notes and Documents Illustrating the Organization of the Protestant Episcopal Church in America (1874)
- Historical Sketch of the Protestant Episcopal Church. 1784–1884 (1884)

== Literature ==
- William Stevens Perry, Episcopate in America (1895), sketch and bibliography
