= Renwick House (Davenport, Iowa) =

Historic house in Iowa, United States

- U.S. National Register of Historic Places
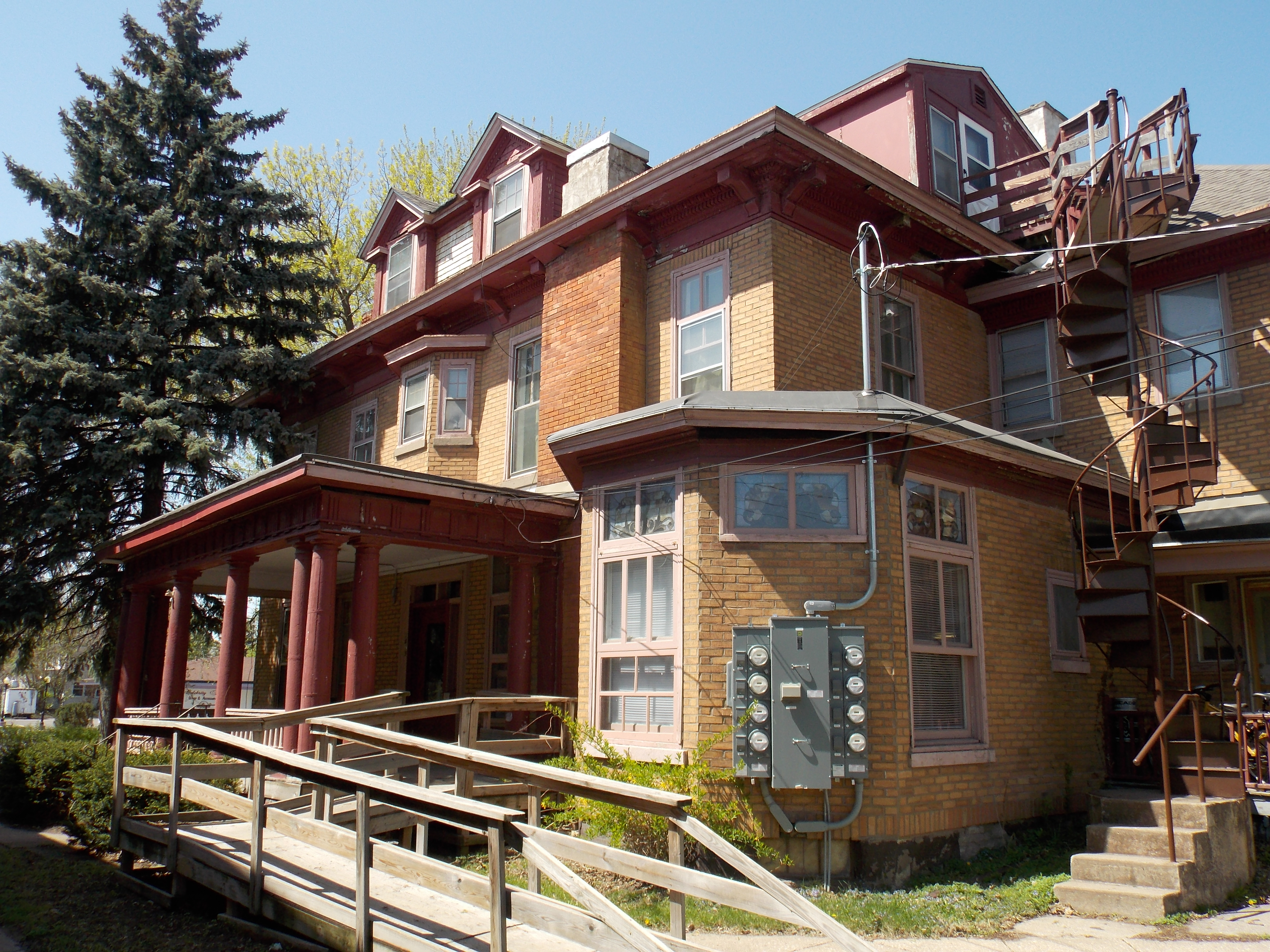
- The front of the Renwick House from the alley

- Location within Iowa Location within the United States
- Location: 1429 Brady St. Davenport, Iowa
- Coordinates: 41°32′3″N 90°34′28″W
- Area: less than one acre
- Built: 1867
- Architectural style: Colonial Revival
- MPS: Davenport MRA
- NRHP reference No.: 83002492
- Added to NRHP: July 7, 1983

The Renwick House is a historic building located in the central part of Davenport, Iowa, United States. It has been listed on the National Register of Historic Places since 1983.

== History ==
The Renwick family may have built this house in 1867, and various members of the family lived here into the 20th century. Lumber baron William Renwick, a partner in the firm Renwick, Crossett & Shaw, lived here from 1867 to around 1895, when he moved to a mansion he built closer to the Mississippi River. That house eventually became a part of St. Katharine's School. His sisters Margaret and Rebecca Renwick lived here from the mid-1890s to just before World War I. It was during this time that the house was extensively renovated. Rebecca owned her own millinery shop named Renwick and Hannah. The house has subsequently been converted into apartments.

== Architecture ==
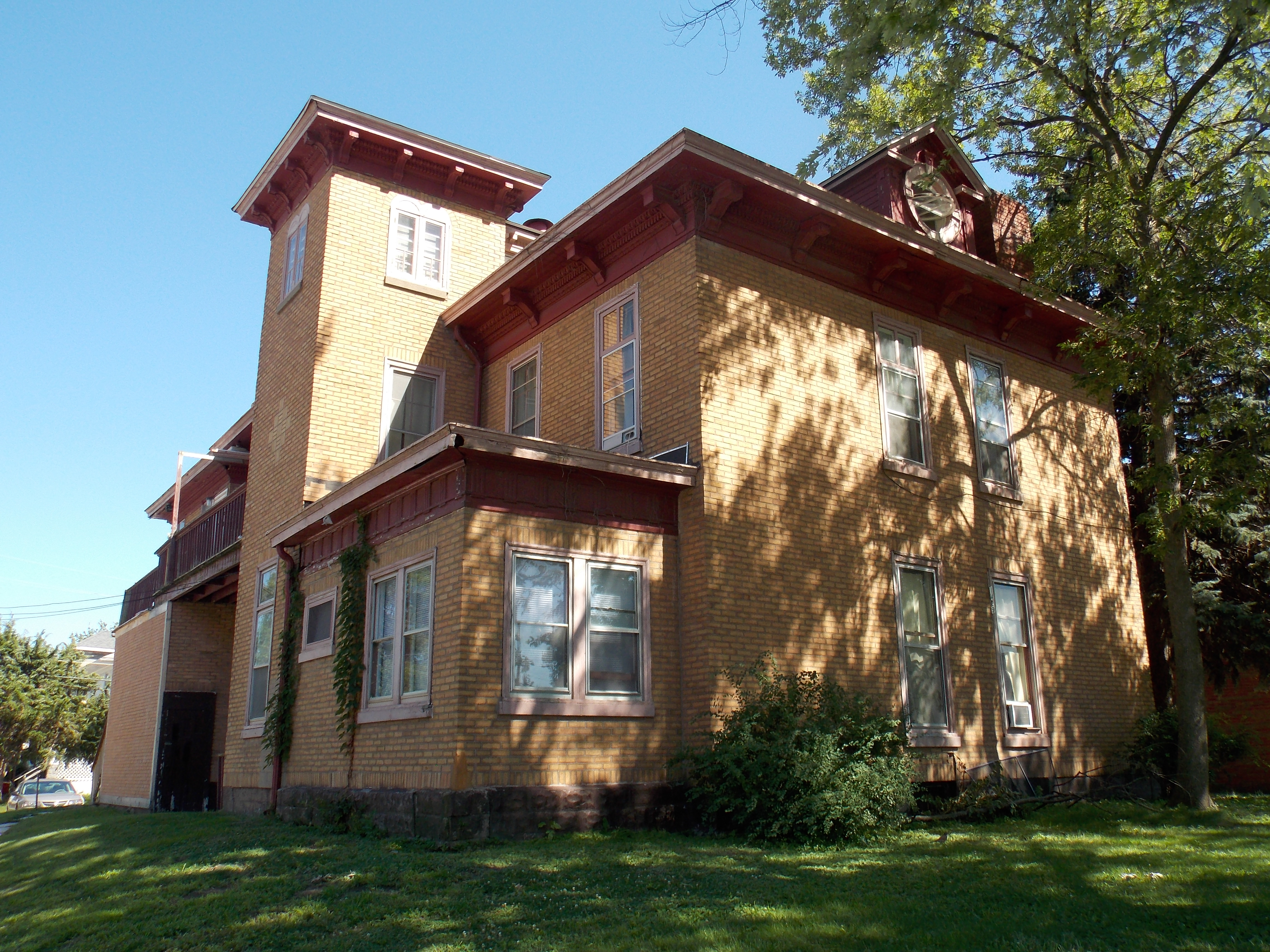
The tower in the back of the house

When the house was built in the late 1860s, it appears to have followed the Italianate style. This is suggested by the three-stage tower still visible at the back of the house. It features a low, bracketed hipped roof typical of the style. The house sits perpendicular to the street and may have faced a great lawn to the south. The back of the house faces Fifteenth Street. It was converted to the Colonial Revival style when it was renovated in 1905. It features a symmetrical façade and a hipped roof with dormers. The dormers themselves have a gable roof that features partially returned cornices and fluted pilasters that flank the small windows. Egg-and-dart and denticular moldings are found on the house's main cornice. The columns on the main porch follow the Doric order. To the right of the porch is an irregularly shaped solar that has stained glass transom panels over tall windows.
