= Henry W. Lee (bishop) =

American bishop

The Right Reverend Henry Washington Lee D.D., LL.D.
- Bishop of Iowa
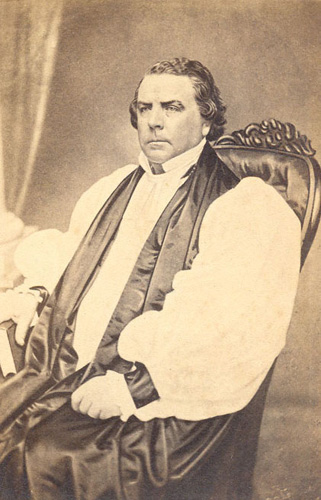
- Church: Episcopal Church
- Diocese: Iowa
- Elected: June 1, 1854
- In office: 1854–1874
- Successor: William Stevens Perry

Orders
- Ordination: October 9, 1839 by Alexander Viets Griswold
- Consecration: October 18, 1854 by John Henry Hopkins

Personal details
- Born: July 29, 1815 Hamden, Connecticut, United States
- Died: September 26, 1874 (aged 59) Davenport, Iowa, United States
- Buried: Oakdale Memorial Gardens
- Denomination: Anglican
- Parents: Roswell Lee & Phebe Potter
- Spouse: Lydia Mason Morton (m. 1839)
- Children: Caroline Lewis née Lee

Henry Washington Lee (July 29, 1815 – September 26, 1874) was a 19th-century bishop in the Protestant Episcopal Church in the United States of America. He served as the first Bishop of Iowa from 1854–1874. He also served as Provisional Bishop of Nebraska from 1857–1859 and Provisional Bishop of Kansas, 1860–1864.

== Biography ==
=== Early life and ministry ===
Lee was born in Hamden, Connecticut, but the family soon moved to Springfield, Massachusetts, where he grew up and was educated. His father was Roswell Lee, who was a colonel and the superintendent of the Springfield Armory and Phebe Lee née Potter. He was ordained a deacon at Grace Church in New Bedford, Massachusetts and a priest in the Episcopal Church by Alexander Viets Griswold in October, 1839. That same year he married Lydia Mason Morton of Taunton, Massachusetts. She was the daughter of Marcus Morton, governor of Massachusetts and Charlotte Morton née Hodges. They raised two sons and a daughter. Lee spent four years as rector of Christ Church in Springfield, and eleven years as rector of St. Luke's Church in Rochester, New York. He received a Doctor of Divinity (DD) degree from Hobart College in 1850, and the University of Rochester in 1852. He received an honorary Doctor of Laws (LLD)from the University of Cambridge, England in 1867.

=== Bishop of Iowa ===
Lee was elected the first bishop of the Diocese of Iowa on June 1, 1854, and he was consecrated by John Henry Hopkins, Bishop of Vermont and Presiding bishop; Samuel A. McCoskry, Bishop of Michigan; and William H. DeLancey, Bishop of Western New York, on October 18, 1854, in St. Luke's Church, Rochester. The bishops of Massachusetts, Maine, and Illinois were also in attendance. Lee was the 61st Episcopal bishop consecrated in the United States, and represented the Evangelical wing of the church.

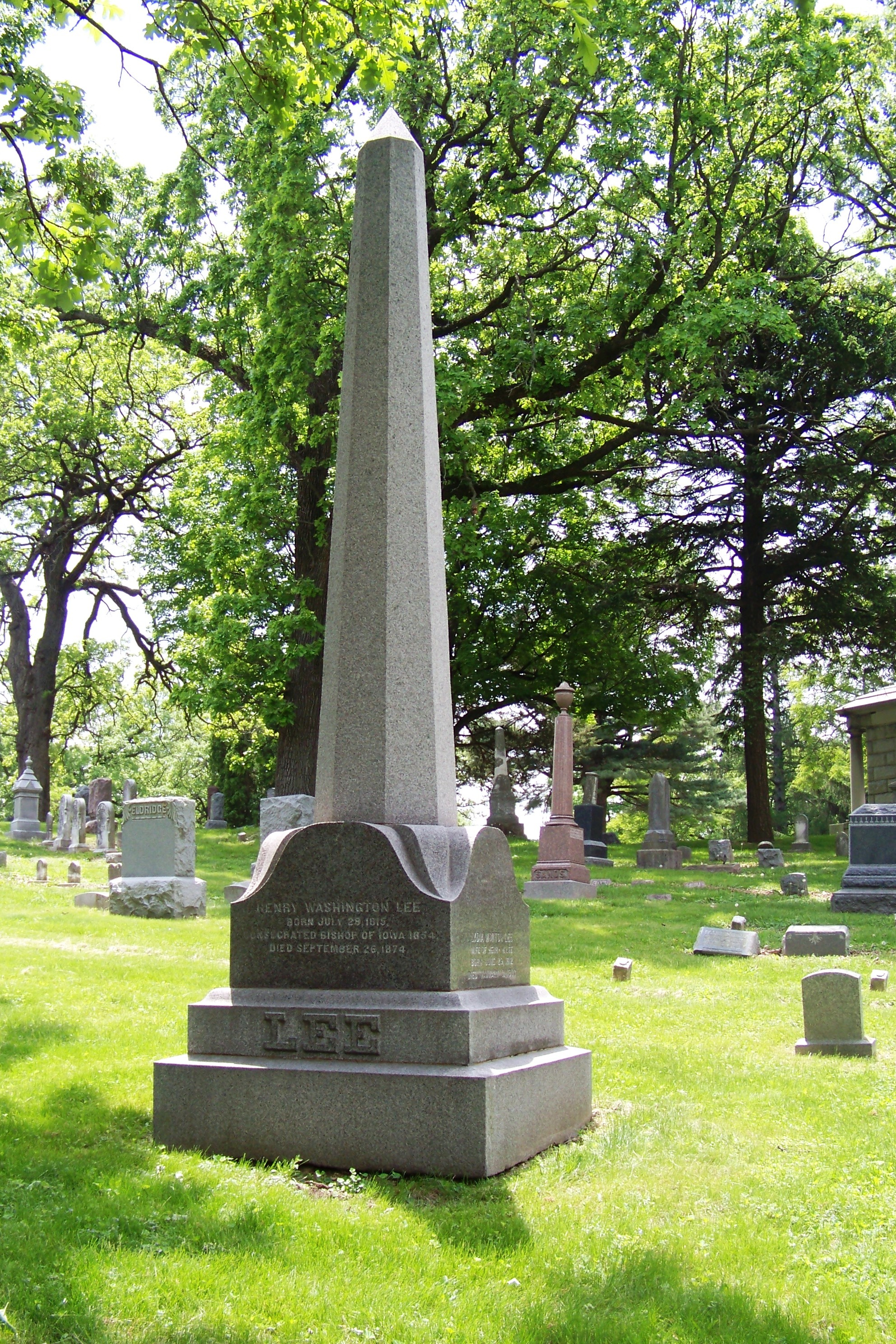
Grave at Oakdale Cemetery

Before Lee arrived in Iowa he visited several large and wealthy churches on the east coast and solicited necessary funds for his new diocese. He then made a visitation of the principal churches of his diocese and then took up residence in Davenport. There were at the time 200 Episcopalians in the state. He invested the money he had obtained from donors in the eastern United States by purchasing 6,000 acres (2,400 ha) of land. With the sale of this land over time he was able to build an episcopal residence and start Griswold College in Davenport. The diocese was also able to realize an endowment of $53,000.

Lee’s hard work in Iowa was recognized by the national church. He played an active role on the Board of Missions. Lee was also selected to serve as Provisional Bishop of Nebraska from 1857–1859 and he served as Provisional Bishop of Kansas from 1860 to 1864.

Lee was bishop during the American Civil War (1861–1865) and he refused to make a public statement or even discuss the matter in private. He also urged those who attended the diocesan convention to do likewise. Lee did, however, preach to the Union soldiers at Camp McClellan and Camp Hendershoot at Davenport, as well as the Confederate prisoners of war at Rock Island. Through an interpreter he also preached to members of the Dakota Tribe who were held prisoner in Davenport following the New Ulm Uprising in Minnesota.

In 1867, Lee made a trip to Europe to attend the first Lambeth Conference. While he was there he preached in some of the largest churches in England, Ireland and France. That same year he laid the cornerstone for Grace Cathedral, later renamed Trinity Cathedral, in Davenport. He lived long enough to see the church completed in 1873, but without its steeple. It was one of the first cathedrals built by the Episcopal Church in the United States.

Lee died at his home in Davenport on September 26, 1874. His funeral was held in Grace Cathedral and he was laid to rest in Oakdale Cemetery in Davenport.

He was an author of several sermons, and a book: Cornelia: or the Deaf Mute.
