= St. Katherine's Historic District =

Historic district in Iowa, United States

- U.S. National Register of Historic Places
- U.S. Historic district
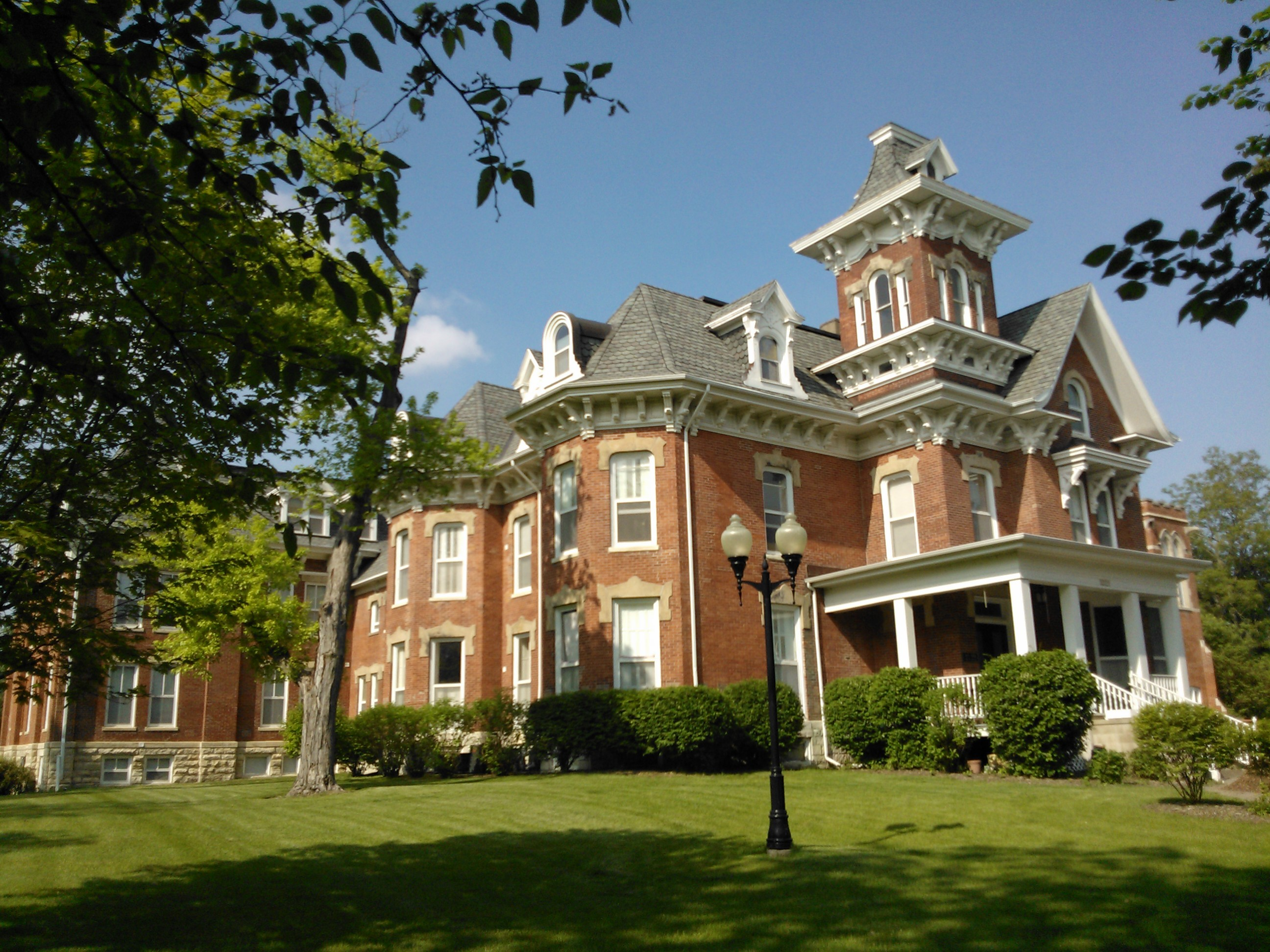
- Cambria Place is the building in which the school began.

- Location within Iowa Location within the United States
- Interactive map showing the location of St. Katherine’s Historic District
- Location: 901 Tremont St. Davenport, Iowa
- Coordinates: 41°31′43″N 90°33′36″W
- Area: 9.37 acres (3.79 ha)
- Built: 1872
- Architect: John C. Cochrane; Edward S. Hammatt
- Architectural style: Italianate; Gothic Revival; Late Victorian
- MPS: Davenport MRA
- NRHP reference No.: 84001551
- Added to NRHP: April 5, 1984

St. Katherine's Historic District is located on the east side Davenport, Iowa, United States and is listed on the National Register of Historic Places. It is the location of two mansions built by two lumber barons until it became the campus of an Episcopal girls' school named St. Katharine's Hall and later as St. Katharine's School. The name was altered to St. Katharine-St. Mark's School when it became coeducational. It is currently the location of a senior living facility called St. Katherine's Living Center.

== Description ==
The historic district is a campus of 9.37 acres (3.79 ha). At the time of its nomination to the National Register, it was made up of six buildings. Two of the buildings were built as houses, Cambria Place and the Renwick Mansion. The other buildings include a large combination classroom and dormitory building, a chapel, and a combination classroom and gymnasium building. The sixth building was a modern dormitory that was not a contributing property and has subsequently been torn down. The district is located in the southeast corner of the LeClaire Reserve. The landscaped grounds are on the side of a hill overlooking a mixed residential and light industrial area along the Mississippi River to the south. To the east is the Bridge Avenue Historic District, a residential neighborhood dating from the 1870s to the 1910s. The LeClaire Reserve, which is largely made up of residential neighborhoods, is located to the north and west.

== History ==
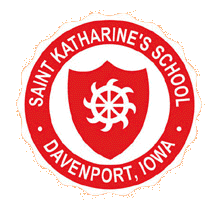
School Seal

In 1883 the Rt. Rev. William Stevens Perry, the second Bishop of Iowa announced his intention to build a school for girls in Davenport. The diocese already operated Griswold College in Davenport. It was founded on the property of the former Iowa College, now known as Grinnell College after it moved to Grinnell, Iowa. The school had been founded in 1859 by the Rt. Rev. Henry Washington Lee, the first Bishop of Iowa. A high school for boys, called Kemper Hall, was created later on the campus in 1885. The school was officially closed in 1899. The college property today is the location of Trinity Episcopal Cathedral and Davenport Central High School.

St. Katharine's Hall replaced Trinity School for girls, which was located in the parish hall of the cathedral. The diocese was able to consider opening a new school for girls based on the will of Sarah Burr from New York City. She had bequeathed $30,000 for such a purpose. They chose a residence on the east side of Davenport called "Cambria Place," the former home of John L. Davies, for the location of the school that opened in 1884. Adelia Rice was the school's first principal. Its initial enrollment was 25 students. The institution was considered a "superior" church boarding school with a college preparatory curriculum. It also allowed day students from the area to enroll. The school grew quickly and an addition, called St. Mary's Hall, was built in 1885 and 1886. By its third year, there was room for 60 boarding students. While most of the students were Episcopalian, there was no such requirement for admission to the school.

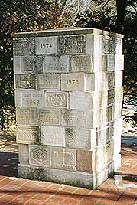
Class stones

The school continued to grow. In 1888 the Richardson Observatory was built. It was said to contain the finest telescope in Iowa. In 1902 the administration of the school was taken over by the Sisters of St. Mary. St. Mary's Chapel and a gymnasium were built in 1903 and the neighboring Renwick House was added to the campus in 1909. It was renamed St. Margaret's Hall.

A former teacher at St. Katharine's, Marion Crandall, was the first American woman killed in World War I. She had taught French at the school and went to work for the French Canteen. Crandall was killed by an exploding shell in France on March 27, 1918.

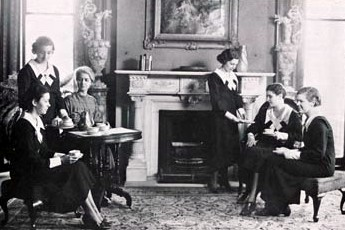
A picture from St. Katharine's in the early 20th century

Major changes came to St. Katharine's in the second half of the 20th century. The school became co-educational in 1966 and discontinued accepting boarding students in 1968. With the addition of boys, the name of the school was changed to St. Katharine-St. Mark. In 1973 it moved to the Joseph F. Bettendorf House in neighboring Bettendorf, Iowa. The school amicably broke its ties with the Episcopal Church in 1980. In 2000 the name of the school changed to Rivermont Collegiate.

When the school moved to Bettendorf, the St. Katharine's property was sold and became a nursing home complex. The buildings started to fall into disrepair until they were bought in 1997 by historic property developer Chris Ales, who converted the complex into a senior living center in 2001. The facility was transformed into 38 low-income senior citizen apartments. The Renwick House was renovated by Ales for his company's headquarters, but he was forced to sell the property to Dr. Joseph Seng in 2007. It was turned into a bed and breakfast.

== Mass Mound ==
There is a legend in the city of Davenport that it will be spared from destruction by a tornado because of the Mass Mound. In 1835 after a period of intense storms a Jesuit missionary, the Rev. Charles Van Quickenborne, SJ, led the first Christian service in what would become the city of Davenport. He erected a crucifix made from native black walnut on a crude altar placed on top of what he called a Mass Mound. It was located on the side of the hill on what would become the St. Katharine's property. He gathered both the white settlers and the Native Americans in the region, regardless of their faith, and celebrated Mass for a week. On the last day, Benediction of the Blessed Sacrament was held and Van Quickenborne blessed the area to preserve it from storms and tornadoes.

The early settlers in Davenport considered the spot a sacred place. Rev. J.A.M. Pelamourges, the first pastor of St. Anthony's Church in Davenport regularly meditated at the site and was known to spend the night in prayer there before the cross before major decisions or when problems arose. Eventually, the crucifix fell apart and was taken away. In time lumber baron John L. Davies built his home on the property before the Diocese of Iowa bought the property for St. Katharine's.

A fire erupted at several lumber mills on July 24, 1901, in the Village of East Davenport. It destroyed 20 acres (8.1 ha) of land, 250 people were left homeless, and businesses suffered $1.25 million in losses. When the fire got to St. Katharine's the wind shifted towards the river. The Mass Mound was credited for sparing the rest of the city.

A shrine was erected in 1928 at the Mass Mound site to the southwest of where the main building is located. It was blessed by the Rt. Rev. Theodore N. Morrison, the third Bishop of Iowa. An altar dedicated to Saint Joseph was blessed by Dean Philbrook of Trinity Cathedral on April 29, 1931. The altar was moved to Bettendorf when St. Katharine-St. Mark's School relocated to the Bettendorf Mansion.

== Architecture ==
Both Cambria Place and the Renwick Mansion were designed by John C. Cochrane, who was one of Davenport's first professional architects. His most famous work was the Iowa State Capitol in Des Moines. Both houses were built in the Italian Villa style, which Cochrane introduced to Davenport. The additions were designed by Davenport architect Edward S. Hammatt, who also designed several other buildings for the Diocese of Iowa, including Kemper Hall. The additions were designed to match Cambria Place.

=== Cambria Place ===
The principal significance of this building comes from its association with lumber baron John L. Davies. Davies moved to Davenport in 1841. After ten years he entered a partnership in a planning mill with B. F. Coates. In 1859 he bought the Cannon and French Sawmill with George H. French as his partner. He continued to expand his lumber interests in Wisconsin and Iowa. Politically, Davies belonged to the Republican Party and was an ardent abolitionist. He had Cambria Place built in 1872.

Cambria Place is an eclectic version of the Italian Villa and exemplifies the extravagant Late Victorian architecture found in Davenport. It is a 2½-story structure that features asymmetrical massing and an entrance tower. The house was constructed of red brick, with a hipped roof covered in slate, ornamented eve brackets, decorative gabled dormers, and different window shapes. The dormers and gable ends feature round arch windows while the windows on the first floor have wide, nearly flush stone lintels of irregular shapes. On the west side of the house are two full height, projecting polygonal bays. The brick porch and the bay window to the right were added in the early 20th century.

=== Renwick Mansion ===
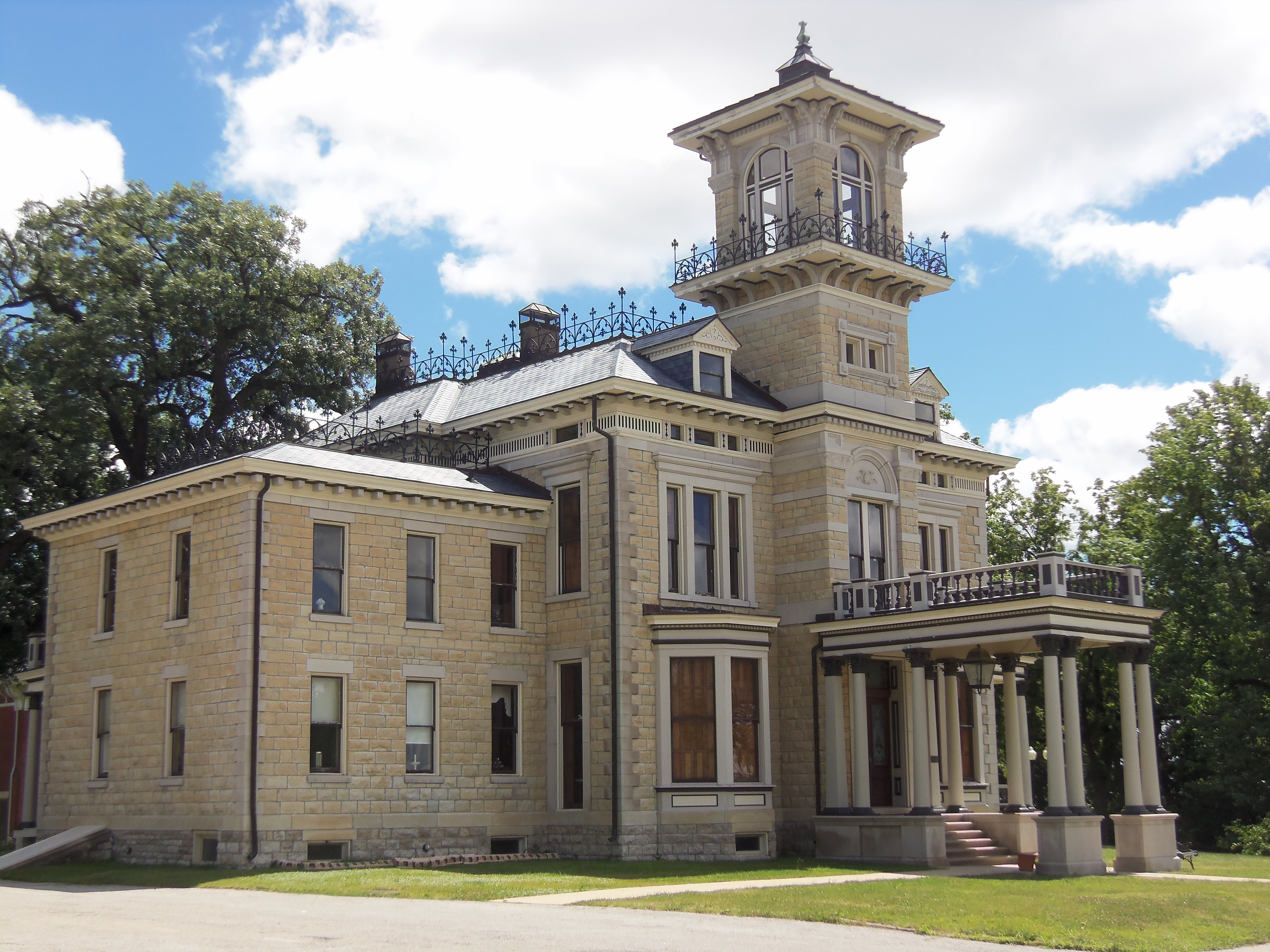
Renwick Mansion

The Renwick Mansion is significant by its association with another lumber baron, William Renwick. He also moved to Davenport in the 1840s. He began his working career in 1850 when he joined his father in the grain commission business. They entered a partnership to manufacture lumber under the name Renwick & Son in 1852. By the end of the decade, William continued the business as a sole proprietor named Renwick & Company. He entered into a partnership in 1875 with George S. Shaw and Edward S. Crosset, and they operated the lumber manufacturing firm of Renwick, Shaw & Crossett. In terms of production and workforce, it was the third-largest mill in the city. Around 1884 they sold the business to Friedrich Weyerhäuser and his partner Frederick Denkmann. The mill buildings were destroyed in the 1901 East Davenport fire. Renwick is associated with two other structures on the National Register of Historic Places in Davenport, his previous home Renwick House (1867) and the Renwick Building (1897).

Renwick had this house built by T. W. McClelland in 1877, and H.G. Braunlich designed the landscaping. It is considered the finest example of the Italian Villa style in the city. The two-story house features a tripartite, symmetrical facade that is clad in rock-faced limestone. Projecting polygonal bays flank the main entrance and a columned porch. The entrance itself is in a large three-story entry tower with ornate iron cresting. In the frieze of the cornice are small rectangular windows in groups of three at the front. It is capped with a hipped roof and ornate iron cresting. The interior features 12-foot (3.7 m) to 14-foot (4.3 m) high wood parlor doors, eight fireplaces, and a three-story staircase.

=== Classroom/Dormitory ===
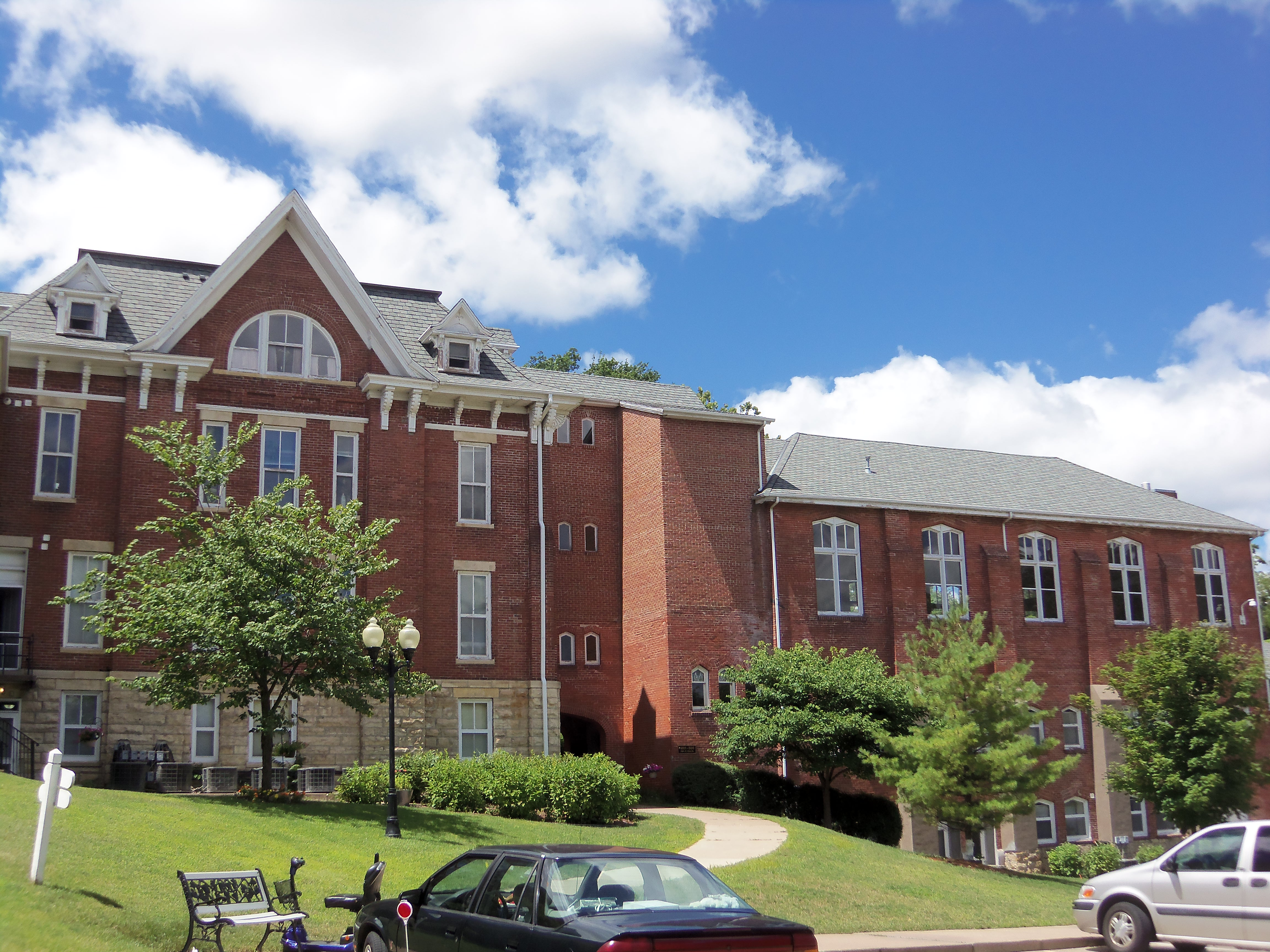
Classroom/Dormitory building (left) and Classroom/Gymnasium (right)

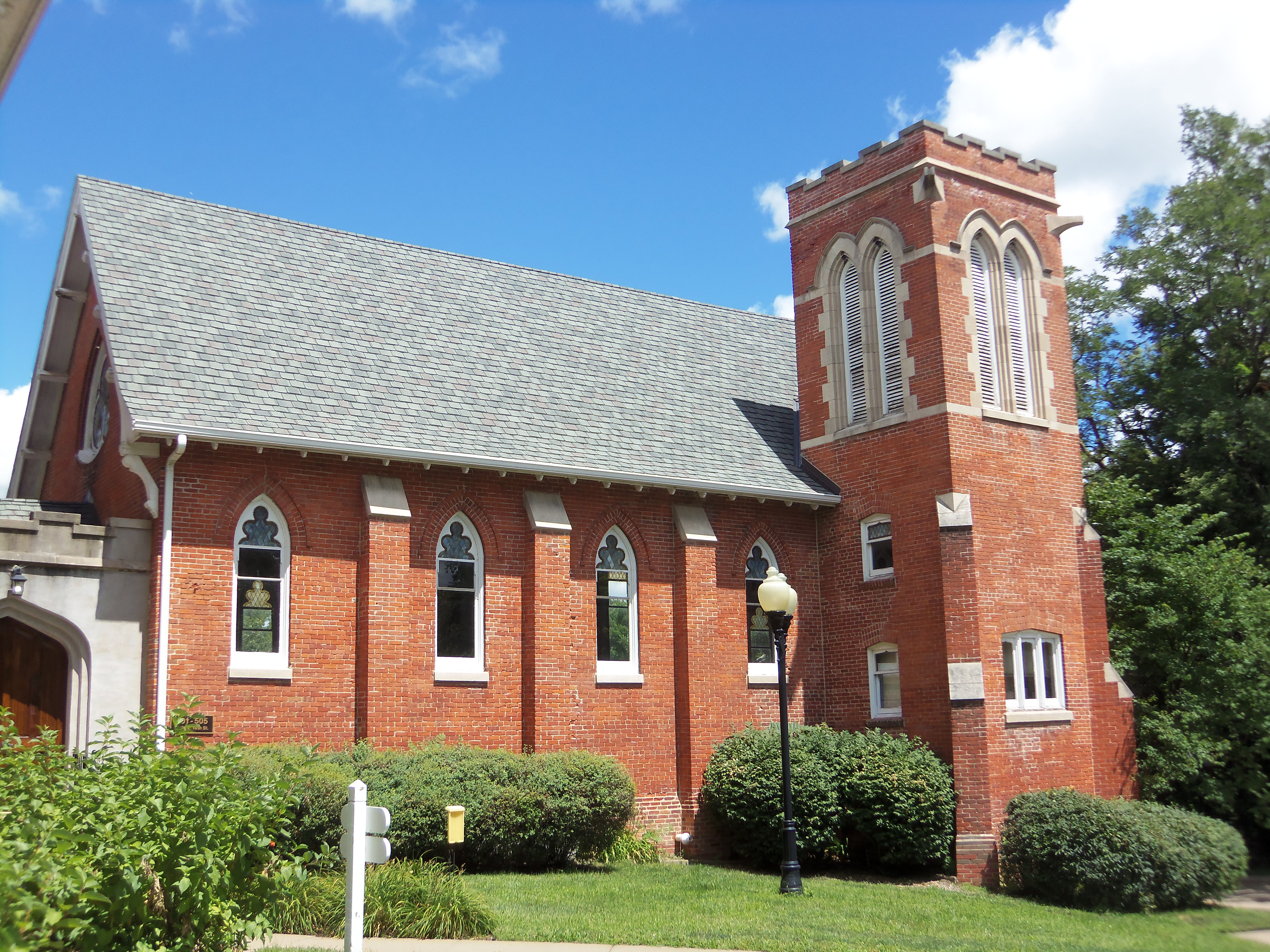
St. Mary's Chapel

The Classroom/Dormitory building, also known as St. Mary's Hall, was built as an addition to Cambria Place from 1884 to 1885. It is a two-story, rectangular plan structure built on a high basement. Designed in a late Victorian Eclectic style, it is capped with a high hipped mansard roof. It features large gabled wall dormers and small wood roof dormers. Round arch windows are found in the roof dormers below a pediment. Both the wall and the roof dormers have gable roofs that are flared at the eaves. The cornice is broad and it is decorated with large fan-shaped wooden brackets.

=== Classroom/Gymnasium ===
The Classroom/Gymnasium addition was added onto St. Mary's Hall from 1902 to 1903. It is a three-story brick structure that follows a largely rectangular plan and it is capped by a hipped roof. The lower half of the wall buttresses are faced with concrete. This addition is much plainer than the rest of the facility and it suggests the move from the picturesque forms of the late 19th century to a more utilitarian form. The triangular-headed windows suggest the Gothic Revival style. Large brick wall buttresses divide the length of the building into five bays. The gymnasium was located on the third floor and is indicated on the exterior by the tall windows. A two-story addition was built later onto the north side.

=== St. Mary's Chapel ===
St. Mary's Chapel was added at the same time as the Classroom/Gymnasium addition. It too was designed in the late Gothic Revival style. Constructed in brick, the chapel features a square bell tower on the south side that is crenelated at the top. The bargeboards are flared at the gable ends. The chapel is five bays in length and divided by buttresses. The nave is indicated by lancet windows. It is connected to St. Mary's Hall by a hyphen.
