= Byron E. Pay (Medal of Honor) =

Medal of Honor Recipient (1844–1906)

- Pay c. 1905

Deputy U.S. Marshal
- In office 1874–1885

Sergeant-at-arms of the Dakota Territorial House of Representatives
- In office 1872–1873

Personal details
- Born: Byron Edward Pay; October 21, 1844 Le Ray, New York, U.S.
- Died: February 19, 1906 (aged 61) Volga, South Dakota, U.S.
- Resting place: Arlington Cemetery; Arlington, South Dakota, U.S.
- Awards: Medal of Honor

Military service
- Allegiance: United States of America
- Branch/service: Union Army
- Years of service: 1861–1864
- Unit: Company H, 2nd Minnesota Infantry Regiment
- Battles/wars: American Civil War

Byron Edward Pay (October 21, 1844 – February 19, 1906) was an American soldier who served in the Union Army during the American Civil War. Pay and eight other soldiers from the 2nd Minnesota Infantry Regiment received the Medal of Honor for actions taken on February 15, 1863, during a skirmish with 125 Confederate cavalry in Nolensville, Tennessee.^{:137}

== Early life ==
Pay was born on October 21, 1844, in Le Ray, New York,^{:137} he was the son of William Pay and Susanne Pay who were English emigrants from London. In 1856 Pay's family moved Woodstock, Illinois, a year later in the spring of 1857, Pay moved to Washington County, Iowa where Pay worked for the local Washington Press newspaper as a printer's devil. In the summer of 1857 Pay move to Blue Earth County, Minnesota where he lived with his brother, Benjamin Pay, and worked on a farm. According to the book History of Blue Earth County and Biographies of its Leading Citizens, Pay resided in Vernon Center, Minnesota shortly before the American Civil War.

== Military service ==
Pay enlisted in the Union Army in Mankato, Minnesota on July 15, 1861, and was enrolled into the ranks of Company H of the 2nd Minnesota Infantry Regiment as a Private. Pay fought with the 2nd Minnesota Infantry at the Battle of Mill Springs, the Battle of Shiloh, the Siege of Corinth, the Battle of Perryville, and the Battle of Stones River.

=== Skirmish at Nolensville ===
On February 15, 1863, Pay was a member of a foraging detail which was sent to forage for food and mules near Nolensville, Tennessee.^{:137} The foraging detail consisted of 10 teams of wagons and 16 soldiers. Pay's detachment was led by First Sergeant (later Lieutenant) Lovilo N. Holmes and consisted of Corporals Milton Hanna, William A. Clark and Samuel Wright, Privates James Flannigan, Samuel Leslie, Louis Londrash, Joseph Burger, John Vale, Samuel Loudon, Charles Liscom, Nelson Crandall, Charles Kraus, Homer Barnard, and Pay himself.^{:137}

Pays detachment followed the Concord Church Road before reaching a farmhouse and began foraging.^{:137} Pay's detachment was suddenly attacked by a Confederate cavalry force of roughly 125 men^{:138} from the 6th Alabama Cavalry Regiment.^{:137} Pay and the detachment successfully defended their wagon train from the cavalry force in an extended skirmish before returning to their main force.^{:137} Eight total men from the detachment received the Medal of Honor for their actions on February 15, 1863.^{:137}

=== Later service ===
Pay was wounded in action at the Battle of Chickamauga in September 1863 and was later discharged from service on July 14, 1864, on the expiration of his 3-years of service, he did not reenlist.

== Medal of Honor citation ==
Pay's September 11, 1897 Medal of Honor citation states the following:

"The President of the United States of America, in the name of Congress, takes pleasure in presenting the Medal of Honor to Private Byron E. Pay, United States Army, for extraordinary heroism on 15 February 1863, while serving with Company H, 2d Minnesota Infantry, in action at Nolensville, Tennessee. Private Pay was one of a detachment of 16 men who heroically defended a wagon train against the attack of 125 cavalry, repulsed the attack and saved the train".

== Later life and death ==
Following the war, Pay had a debt of $100 to the Union Army, to work off this debt Pay was employed by James Boyd Hubbell of the American Fur Company as a teamster to transport freight wagons and furs to Fort Thompson in Dakota Territory. Byron was later assigned as a civilian teamster to Company L of the 2nd Minnesota Cavalry Regiment which had been fighting the Dakota people in Dakota Territory during Sully's Expedition and were tasked with deporting the Dakota living in Minnesota to the Crow Creek Indian Reservation. Pay later hauled freight to Fort Berthold and would work for the American Fur Company until 1871.

Pay eventually moved with his family to Brookings County in Dakota Territory in 1873 and settled on a farm near modern-day Oakwood Lakes State Park. From 1872 to 1873 Pay served as the Sergeant-at-arms for the Dakota Territorial House of Representatives. While in Oakwood, Pay was employed as the village postmaster from 1874 to 1875. Pay later moved to Volga, South Dakota where he was employed as a Deputy U.S. Marshal from 1874 to 1885. In 1879 Pay worked as an Indian agent for the United States Department of Justice in Yankton, South Dakota and the Black Hills.

Pay died of a stroke on February 19, 1906, in Volga, he is buried in Arlington Cemetery in Arlington, South Dakota.

== Personal life ==
Pay was married to Hattie Youngman from Minnesota on September 10, 1867, together they had two sons.
