= Milton Hanna (Medal of Honor) =

American Union Army soldier (1842 – 1913)

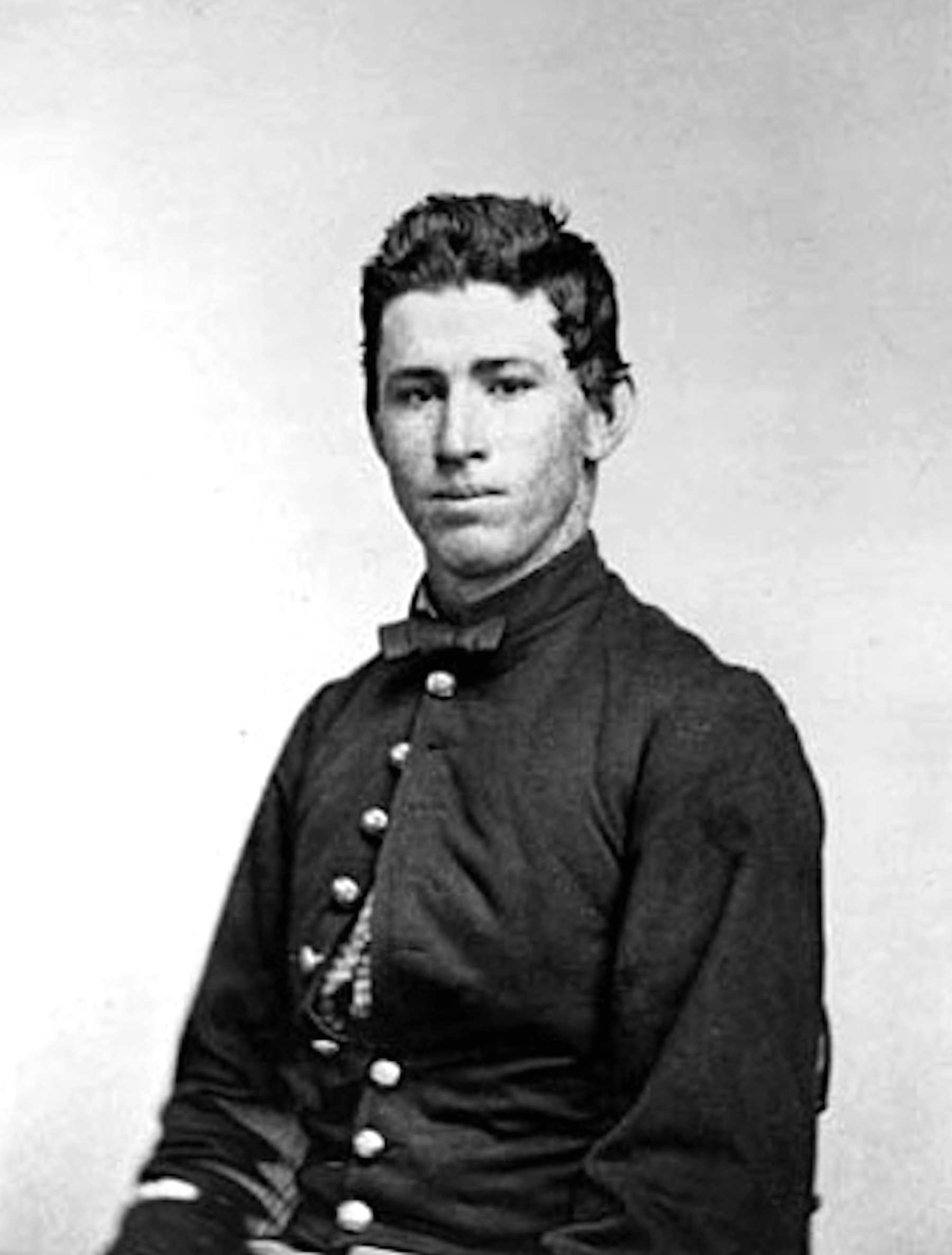
- Hanna in the 1860s
- Born: January 12, 1842; Etna Township, Ohio, U.S.
- Died: January 21, 1913 (aged 71); Minnehaha, Minneapolis, U.S.
- Burial place: Glenwood Cemetery; Mankato, Minnesota, U.S.
- Military career
- Allegiance: United States of America
- Branch: Union Army
- Service years: 1861–1865
- Rank: Sergeant
- Units: Company H, 2nd Minnesota Infantry Regiment
- Conflicts: American Civil War
- Awards: Medal of Honor

Milton Hanna (January 12, 1842 – January 21, 1913) was an American soldier who served in the Union Army during the American Civil War. Hanna and 8 others from his company received the Medal of Honor for actions taken on February 15, 1863 during a skirmish with Confederate cavalry in Nolensville, Tennessee.

== Early life ==
Hanna was born in Etna Township, Ohio on January 12, 1842 to parents James Hanna and Nancy (nee: Bowden) Hanna. On May 13, 1853, his family moved to Minnesota Territory and settled in what is now Mankato, Minnesota in Blue Earth County. After the death of his father in 1855, Hanna pursued a livelihood of farming before enlisting in the military.

== Military service ==
At the outbreak of the American Civil War Hanna, at 19 years old, volunteered for service in the Union Army, enlisting on June 22, 1861. He was enrolled into the ranks of Company H of the 2nd Minnesota Infantry Regiment and fought with the regiment at the Battle of Mill Springs, the Battle of Shiloh, the Siege of Corinth, the Battle of Perryville, and the Battle of Stones River.

=== Skirmish at Nolensville ===
Following Stones River on February 15, 1863, Hanna and 14 other soldiers of Company H of the 2nd Minnesota along with a 10-team wagon train were detailed to search the countryside near Nolensville, Tennessee for feed for the company's mules, under the command of then-Sergeant Lovilo N. Holmes. The detachment consisted of Sergeant Holmes, Corporals Milton Hanna, William A. Clark and Samuel Wright, Privates James Flannigan, Samuel Leslie, Louis Londrash, Joseph Burger, Byron Pay, John Vale, Samuel Loudon, Charles Liscom, Nelson Crandall, Charles Kraus, and Homer Barnard.

The detachment stopped at a plantation to load corn from a corn crib into their wagons when they were suddenly attacked by a Confederate cavalry force of 125 mounted soldiers of the 6th Alabama Cavalry Regiment. Sergeant Holmes ordered the 15-man detachment to take cover inside the barn and corn crib and to hold their fire until he fired first. A small skirmish between Holmes' detachment and the cavalry force ensued until reinforcements from the 2nd Minnesota came to Holmes' aid. Holmes and his significantly smaller force were able to successfully defend themselves and their wagons from the Confederate assault.

For their role in the defense of the wagon train, eight of the soldiers from the detachment were each awarded the Medal of Honor on September 11, 1897; the recipients were Burger, Clark, Flannigan, Hanna, Holmes, Pay, Vale, and Wright. Other recipients of the Medal of Honor who did not receive it because they had died before 1897 included Louden, who was killed at the Battle of Missionary Ridge in 1863, Barnard, who died in 1864, and Crandall and Kraus, who were both killed during the Chattanooga campaign in 1864.

=== Later service ===
Hanna was seriously wounded at the Battle of Chickamauga in September 1863, but re-enlisted in Company H on December 15, 1863. He served the rest of his re-enlistment with the 2nd Minnesota and later took part in the Grand Review of the Armies before being mustered out of service with the rest of the regiment on July 11, 1865 in Louisville, Kentucky.

== Medal of Honor citation ==
Hanna's Medal of Honor citation states the following:

"The President of the United States of America, in the name of Congress, takes pleasure in presenting the Medal of Honor to Corporal Milton Hanna, United States Army, for extraordinary heroism on 15 February 1863, while serving with Company H, 2d Minnesota Infantry, in action at Nolensville, Tennessee. Corporal Hanna was one of a detachment of 16 men who heroically defended a wagon train against the attack of 125 cavalry, repulsed the attack and saved the train".

== Personal life and death ==
Hanna was married to Louise N. Purrier on November 1, 1869, and together they had two children. The book History of Blue Earth County and Biographies of its Leading Citizens states that Hanna was a follower of Presbyterianism. Following the war, Hanna was an active member in the Grand Army of the Republic and belonged to Wilkin Post No. 19 of the GAR. He died on January 21, 1913 at the Minnehaha Soldiers' Home in Minneapolis.
