= Mortimer Thomson =

American journalist

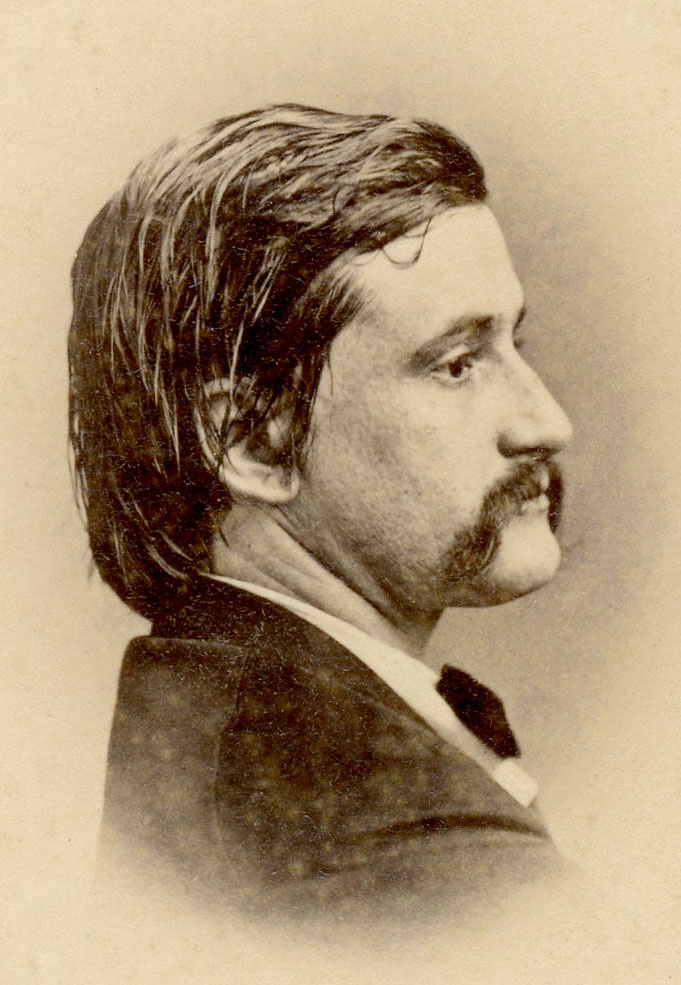
- Mortimer Thomson
- Born: September 2, 1831; Riga, New York, US
- Died: June 25, 1875 (aged 43); New York, New York, US
- Spouses: Anna Houston Van Cleve (m. 1857; died 1858) Grace Harrington Eldredge (m. 1861; died 1862)
- Children: 2
- Relatives: Fanny Fern (mother-in-law); Horatio P. Van Cleve (father-in-law); Charlotte Ouisconsin Clark Van Cleve (mother-in-law)

Mortimer Neal Thomson (September 2, 1831 – June 25, 1875) was an American journalist and humorist who wrote under the pseudonym Q. K. Philander Doesticks. He was born in Riga, New York and grew up in Ann Arbor, Michigan. He attended Michigan University but was expelled along with several others either for his involvement in secret societies or for "too much enterprise in securing subjects for the dissecting room." After a brief period working in theater, he became a journalist and lecturer.

For his published writings, he used the pen name "Q. K. Philander Doesticks, P. B.", a pseudonym he had first used in university (the full version is "Queer Kritter Philander Doesticks, Perfect Brick"). A collection published in 1855, Doesticks What He Says, reprinted many of his pieces. In 1856 he wrote Plu-Ri-Bus-Tah, a parody of Henry Wadsworth Longfellow's The Song of Hiawatha. Thomson is credited with coining terms including brass knuckles, gutter-snipe, good and ready, and grin and bear it.

In on October 31, 1857 he married Anna Houston Van Cleve, daughter of Horatio P. Van Cleve and Charlotte Ouisconsin Clark Van Cleve. She died shortly after giving birth to a son, Mark Van Cleve Thompson, in December 1858. Three months later, Thomson went to Savannah, Georgia posing as a buyer for the Great Slave Auction while undercover for the New-York Tribune. He then published a biting article titled, "What Became of the Slaves on a Georgia Plantation?", which was later published as a pamphlet in 1863 by the American Anti-slavery Society and translated into several languages. The title of the pamphlet included the subtitle: "A Sequel to Mrs. Kemble's Journal" in reference to Journal of a Residence on a Georgian Plantation 1838-1839 written by Fanny Kemble, based on her first-hand accounts of the plantation owned by her husband and seller of the auction, Pierce Mease Butler.

In May 1861, Thomson married Grace Harrington Eldredge, daughter of Fanny Fern and Charles Harrington Eldredge. They had one daughter, Grace Ethel Thomson, on December 1, 1862. Grace Harrington Eldredge died several weeks later. Grace Ethel was then adopted by her maternal grandmother, Fanny Fern and her step-grandfather James Parton. Grace Ethel would later change her name to Ethel Parton and become a well-known writer of children's books.

Thomson died on June 25, 1875 in New York City. In 1888, when his short piece "A New Patent Medicine Operation" was anthologized in Mark Twain's Library of Humor, an introductory paragraph described Thomson as a figure whose "dashing and extravagant drolleries" had quickly passed from fashion.

== Books ==
- Doesticks: A Poetical Letter ... to His Younger Brother, Containing a Thousand and One Lines. Detroit: Wales, 1854.
- Doesticks What He Says. New York: E. Livermore, 1855.
- Plu-Ri-Bus-Tah: a song that's by no author, a deed without a name. New York: Livermore & Rudd, 1856.
- (with Edward Fitch Underhill) The History and Records of the Elephant Club: Comp. from Authentic Documents Now in Possession of the Zoological Society. New York: Livermore & Rudd, 1856.
- Nothing to Say: a Slight Slap at Mobocratic Snobbery, Which Has 'Nothing to Do' with 'Nothing to Wear'. New York: Rudd, 1857.
- Great Auction Sale of Slaves at Savannah, Georgia, March 2d and 3d, 1859. New York: American Anti-slavery Society, 1859.
- The Witches of New York, as Encountered by Q.K. Philander Doesticks, P.B. New York: Rudd & Carleton, 1859.
- The Lady of the Lake: A Travestie in One Act. The minor drama, no. 176. New York: S. French, 1860.
