= Horatio P. Van Cleve House =

Historic house in Minnesota, United States

- U.S. National Register of Historic Places
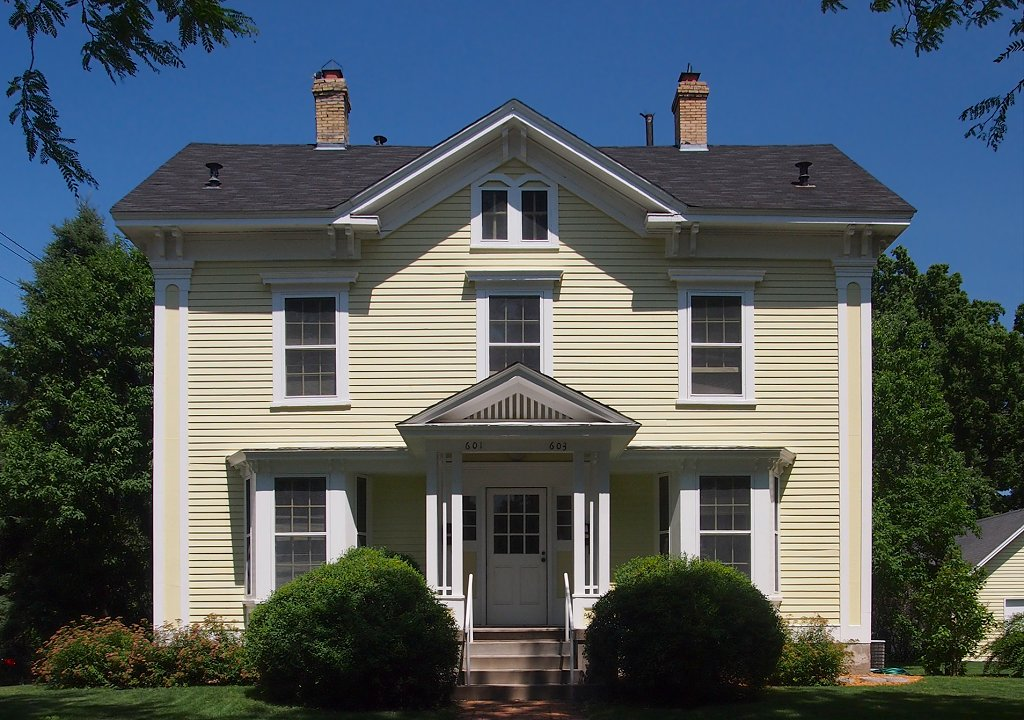
- The Van Cleve House from the southwest

- Location within Minnesota Location within the United States
- Location: 603 5th St., SE, Minneapolis, Minnesota
- Coordinates: 44°59′10″N 93°14′44″W
- Built: 1858
- Architectural style: Greek Revival
- NRHP reference No.: 76001064
- Added to NRHP: March 16, 1976

The Horatio P. Van Cleve House is a house in the Marcy-Holmes neighborhood of Minneapolis, Minnesota, United States. The house contains elements of the Greek Revival and Italianate styles. It was originally built for William Kimball, a furniture manufacturer; the Van Cleves were the second owners. Horatio P. Van Cleve served as colonel of the 2nd Minnesota Volunteer Infantry Regiment and later a general during the American Civil War.

His wife, Charlotte Ouisconsin Clark Van Cleve, was the mother of 12 children, a women's suffrage advocate, and the first woman elected to the Minneapolis School Board. She was also a social reformer who founded an organization to help "erring women" in 1875. The house is listed on the National Register of Historic Places.
