= Judson Wade Bishop =

Union Army officer and railroad executive (1831–1917)

Brigadier General Judson Wade Bishop
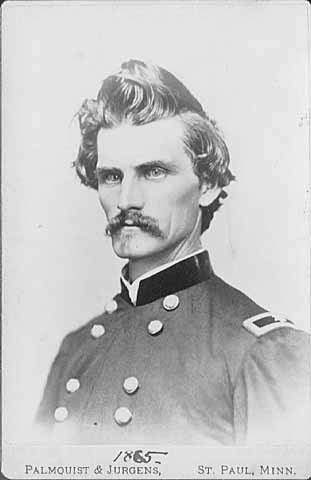
- Brigadier General Judson Wade Bishop, c. 1865
- Born: June 24, 1831; Le Ray, New York, U.S.
- Died: March 19, 1917 (aged 85); Saint Paul, Minnesota, U.S.
- Burial place: Oakland Cemetery, St. Paul, Minnesota
- Education: Rensselaer Polytechnic Institute
- Spouses: Ellen "Nellie" S. Husted; Mary Libannia Axtell
- Children: Charles Hustad Bishop; Edwin Judson Bishop; Robert Haven Bishop
- Military career
- Allegiance: United States
- Army: Union Army
- Service years: June 16, 1861 – July 11, 1865
- Rank: Colonel, Brevet Brigadier General
- Units: Company A, 2nd Minnesota Infantry Regiment
- Commands: 2nd Minnesota Volunteer Infantry Regiment; 1st Brigade, 3rd Division, XIV Corps
- Conflicts: American Civil War; Battle of Mill Springs; Shiloh Campaign; Siege of Corinth; Heartland Offensive; Battle of Perryville; Tullahoma Campaign; Battle of Hoover's Gap; Chickamauga Campaign; Battle of Chickamauga; Siege of Chattanooga; Battle of Missionary Ridge; Atlanta campaign; Battle of Resaca; Battle of Kennesaw Mountain; Siege of Atlanta; Battle of Jonesborough; Carolinas campaign; Battle of Bentonville
- Other work: Chief Engineer and General Manager of the Chicago, St. Paul, Minneapolis and Omaha Railway; Co-owner of the Langdon, Bishop, and Company railroad contracting firm; Owner of the St. Paul Trust Company

Judson Wade Bishop (June 24, 1831 – March 19, 1917) was an American railroad draftsman, surveyor, newspaper editor, and brigadier general who commanded the 2nd Minnesota Infantry Regiment during the American Civil War. He was later a key figure in the consolidation of the Chicago, St. Paul, Minneapolis and Omaha Railway.

Born in New York and trained as a civil engineer, Bishop settled in Minnesota Territory in 1857 and worked as a railroad draftsman and newspaper publisher before enlisting in 1861. He rose to command the 2nd Minnesota and led its uphill charge at the Battle of Missionary Ridge in 1863, a feat later depicted in a painting commissioned for the Minnesota State Capitol. Brevetted a brigadier general in 1865, he returned after the war to Minnesota's railroad industry and published a regimental history, The Story of a Regiment (1890).

== Early life ==
Judson Wade Bishop was born on June 24, 1831, near Le Ray, New York, to the Reverend John Fletcher Bishop and Allena Bishop (née Brown). According to the Minnesota Historical Society, Bishop had one brother, John F. Bishop, and two sisters, Anna Bishop and Lena Bishop. Bishop was educated at the academies in both Fredonia and Belleville, and was later trained in civil engineering at the Rensselaer Polytechnic Institute in Troy, New York.

From 1853 to 1857, Bishop worked as a draftsman for the Grand Trunk Railway Company of Canada. In 1857, Bishop moved to the Minnesota Territory, where he worked as a draftsman and surveyor for the Winona and St. Peter Railroad and the River Valley and Southern Minnesota Railroad. Following the Panic of 1857, Bishop wrote for and published the Chatfield Democrat newspaper from 1859 to 1861 in Chatfield, Minnesota.

== Civil War ==
During the American Civil War, Bishop enlisted in the Union Army in Chatfield, Minnesota. As the 1st Minnesota Infantry Regiment had already filled its quota for recruits, Bishop helped to organize the recruitment of Company A, nicknamed the "Chatfield Guards", of the 2nd Minnesota Infantry Regiment, under the command of Colonel Horatio P. Van Cleve.

According to The Weekly Pioneer and Democrat, the Chatfield Guards were composed of "well-to-do" farmers from the surrounding area. Bishop was elected captain of Company A. In his memoir The Story of a Regiment, Bishop is purported to be the first man to enlist in the 2nd Minnesota.

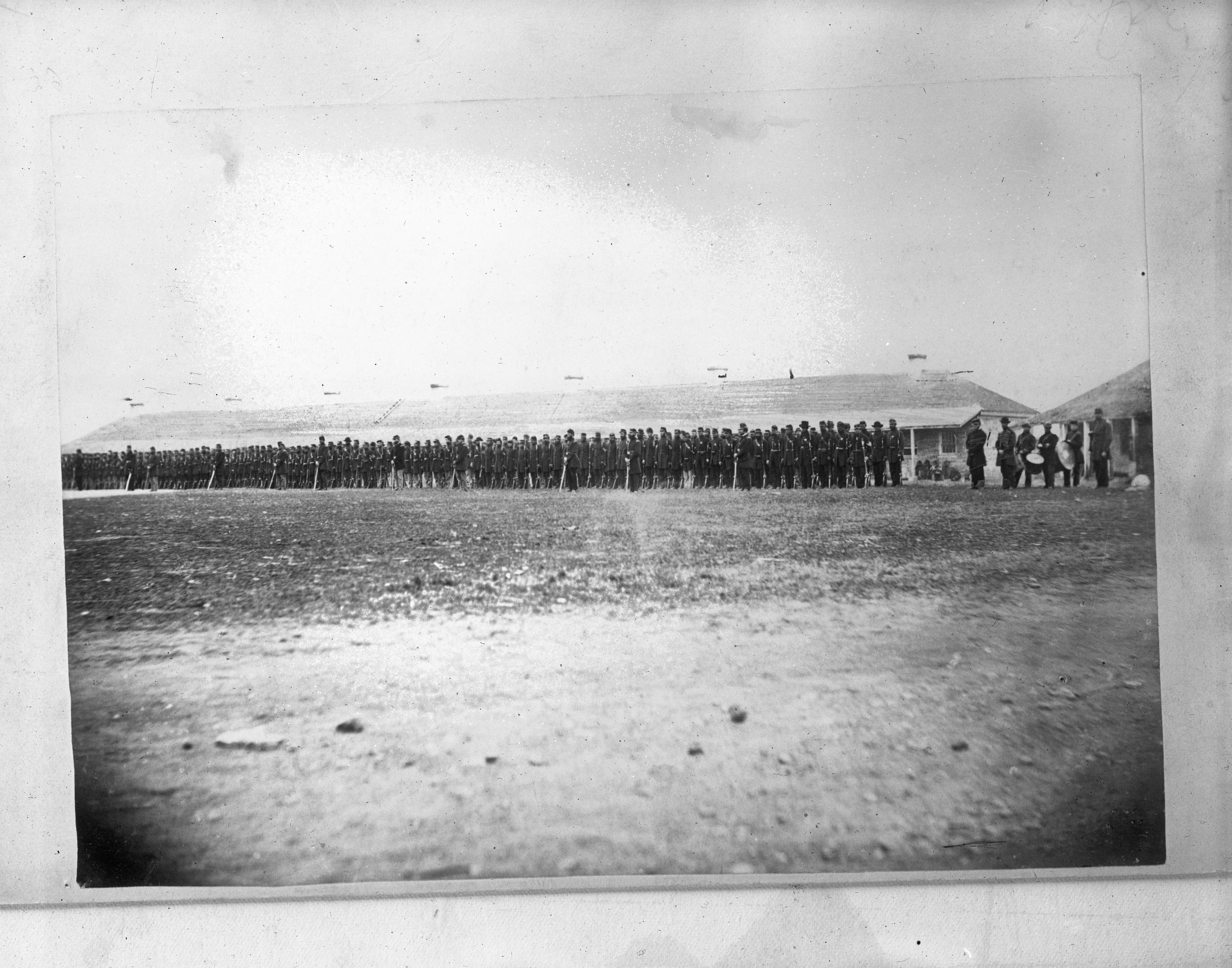
2nd Minnesota Regiment of Volunteers just before they left for the Civil War, 1861.

Bishop's Company A was initially composed of only 83 men, including one fifer, two drummers, and one teamster. Bishop's length of service during the American Civil War spanned the entirety of the regiment's service history from 1861 to 1865.

=== Siege of Corinth and Perryville ===
During the Siege of Corinth, Bishop was promoted from captain of Company A to major on May 15, 1862. Shortly after the Battle of Perryville, Bishop was promoted to lieutenant colonel on October 15, 1862.

=== Charge at Missionary Ridge ===
During the Battle of Missionary Ridge in Tennessee, Bishop led the 2nd Minnesota alongside other regiments of the XIV Corps in an uphill assault, which resulted in the Union gaining control of an important rail center and breaking the Confederate line.

The 2nd Minnesota's brigade commander Colonel Ferdinand Van Derveer described Bishop's assault as follows:

"My brigade moved at once with cheers and a hearty good will, the 2nd Minnesota occupying a position in the first line. The precipitous ascent, the enemy's sharpshooters in front and the terrific enfilading artillery fire upon each flank, were forgotten in their eager haste to storm the heights - As my men sprang over the works, the enemy's cannoneers were caught in the act of loading, and were bayonetted or driven off before they could fire their pieces. Five guns were found here in position and captured by the brigade two (2) by the 2nd Minnesota and three (3) by the 35th Ohio. The larger part of the enemy retired along the ridge towards the left, vigorously pursued and driven near half a mile".

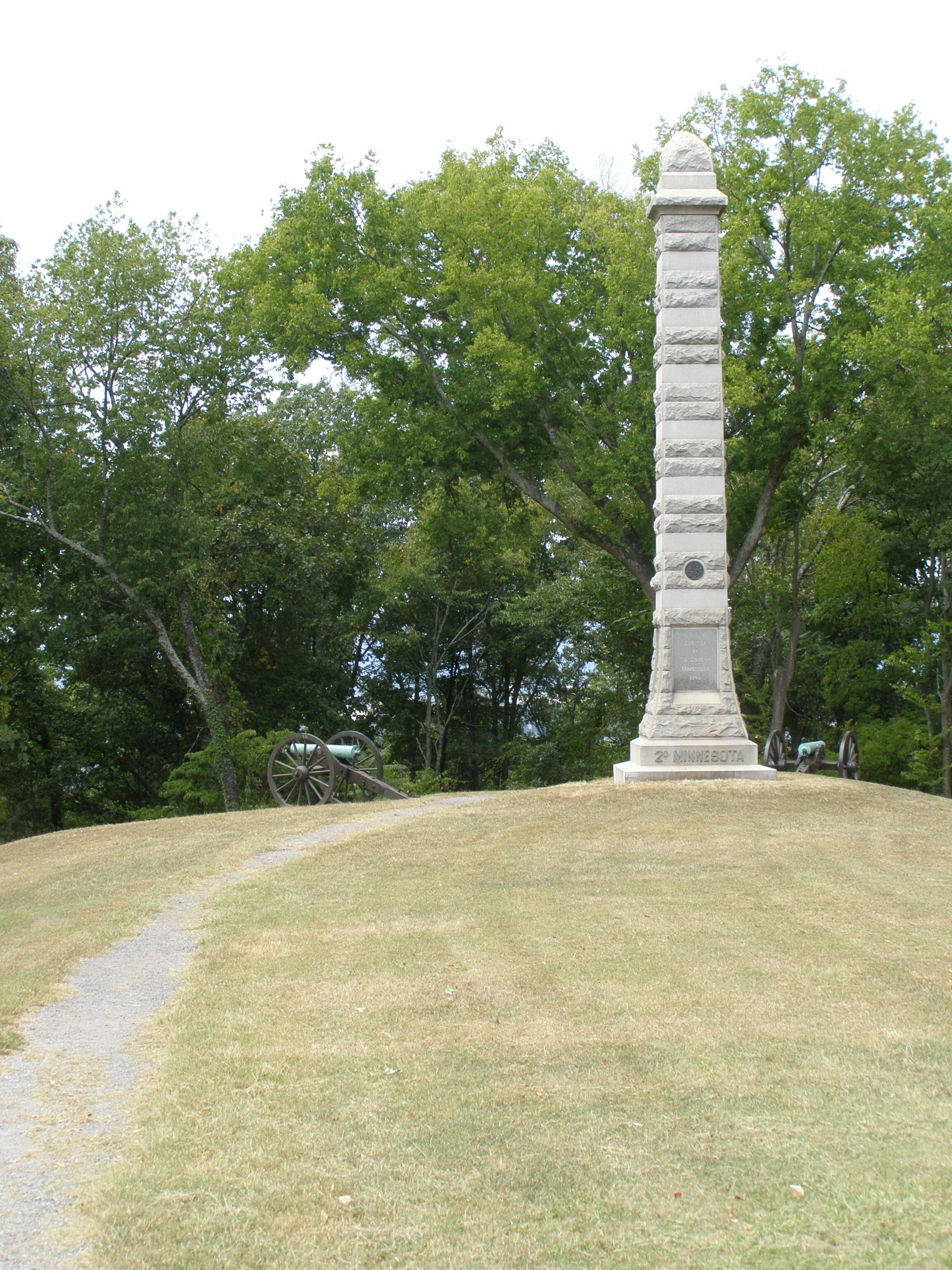
2nd Minnesota Monument atop Missionary Ridge on DeLong Reservation (Chattanooga).

For his bravery in leading the charge of the 2nd Minnesota, Bishop was recommended for promotion to colonel by Colonel Newell Gleason, the commander of the 2nd Brigade, 2nd Division, XIV Corps. Major Calvin S. Uline and Captain Clinton A. Cilley were also recommended for promotion to lieutenant colonel and major respectively. Colonel Gleason wrote in a July 14, 1864 letter to Adjutant General of Minnesota Oscar Malmros:

"I take this opportunity to state that the 2nd Minnesota Veteran Volunteer Infantry is regarded as one of the very best organizations in the service, and that the above named officers are especially deserving of promotion for their efficiency and strict attention to duty. The good of the service and justice to these officers require that the regiment be filled to the minimum, in order that a full quota of field officers may be mustered".

=== Atlanta Campaign and Carolinas ===
Bishop was promoted to colonel of the 2nd Minnesota after the June 29, 1864, resignation of the regiment's longtime leader, Mexican–American War veteran Colonel James George. On June 7, 1865, Bishop was brevetted to the rank of brigadier general for meritorious service during the conflict. Bishop commanded the 1st Brigade, 3rd Division, XIV Corps with Lieutenant Colonel Calvin S. Uline serving as the 2nd Minnesota's impromptu commander until being mustered out on July 11, 1865, in Louisville, Kentucky.

== Railroad career ==
Judson W. Bishop's The Story of a Regiment, c. 1890.

After the war, Bishop returned to Minnesota and worked as a railroad draftsman alongside Robert Bruce Langdon in St. Paul. Together, Bishop and Langdon created the Langdon, Bishop and Company railroad contracting firm. Later in 1883, Bishop created the St. Paul Trust Company, which he operated until 1903. Bishop was a significant contributor to the rail transport industry of St. Paul. Bishop worked extensively as the chief engineer on the merging of the Chicago, St. Paul, Minneapolis and Omaha Railway, where he would eventually serve as the general manager of its operations.

In 1890, Bishop published a regimental history book of the Second Minnesota Regiment titled, The Story of a Regiment: Being the Narrative of the Service of the Second Regiment, Minnesota Veteran Volunteer Infantry in the Civil War from 1861-1865. Bishop died on March 19, 1917, at his home in the Historic Hill District of St. Paul and is buried at the Oakland Cemetery in St. Paul.

== Personal life ==
On June 11, 1866, Bishop married Ellen "Nellie" S. Husted (1839 - 1878) and had three sons. Bishop later married Mary Libannia Axtell, the daughter of the Reverend Charles Axtell of Xenia, Ohio, and had five daughters.

== Legacy ==
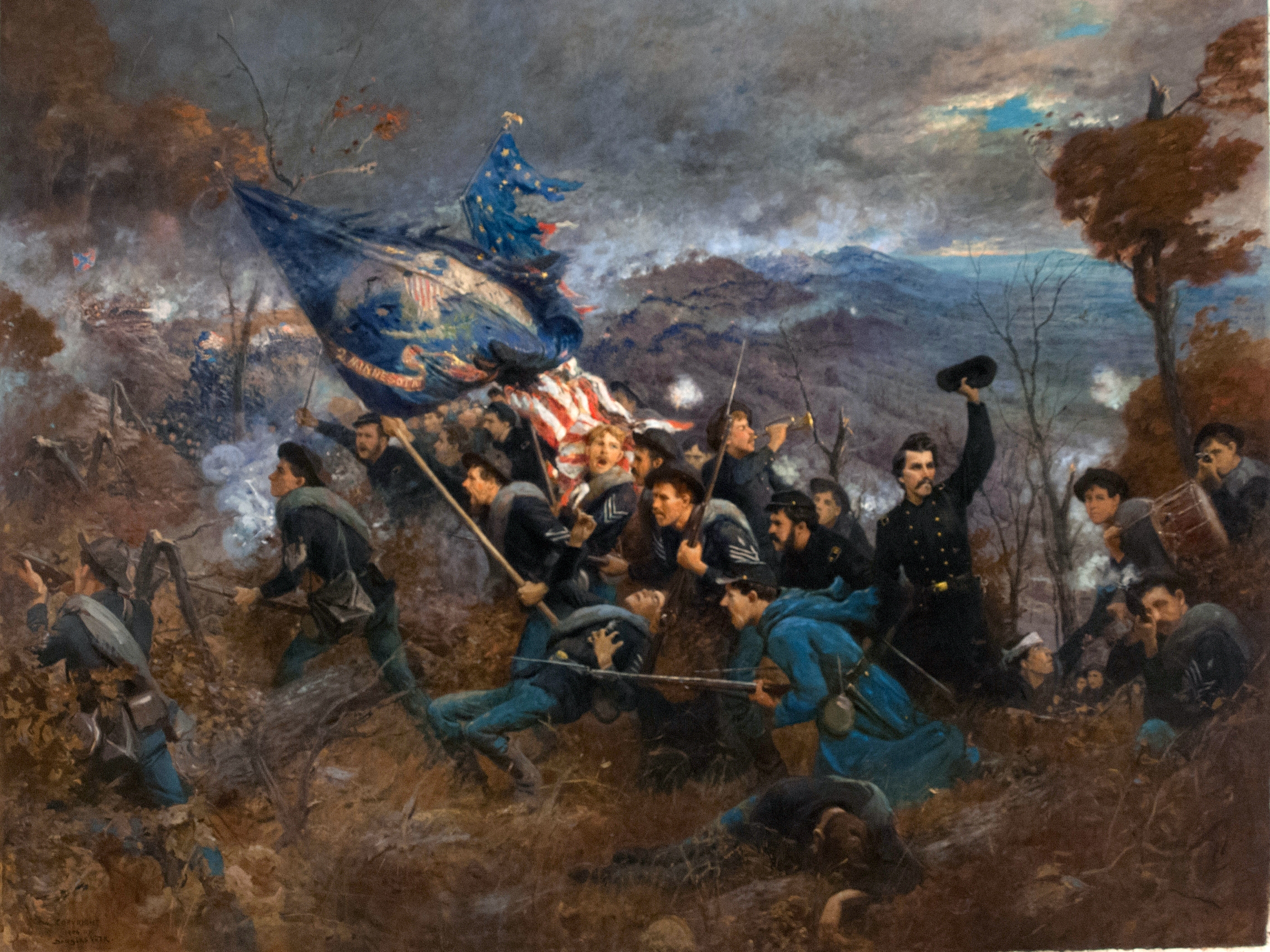
The Second Minnesota Regiment at Missionary Ridge, c. 1906, by Douglas Volk.

In 1905, Bishop's feat at the Battle of Missionary Ridge was commissioned by Cass Gilbert, the architect of the Minnesota State Capitol, among other artwork. Gilbert had commissioned Massachusetts artist Douglas Volk to create a painting of the moment when Bishop's troops captured the summit. Preliminary sketches and variants of the final painting are held by the Minnesota Historical Society. Volk would go on to establish the Minneapolis School of Fine Art in 1886, the predecessor to the Minneapolis College of Art and Design. Volk's portrait is still on display in the Governor's Reception Room at the Minnesota State Capitol. In 2016, following a heated debate, the portraits were voted to remain at the Minnesota State Capitol.

In 1882, Bishop commissioned an elegant Second Empire style home to be built at 193 Mackubin Street in Saint Paul, Minnesota. Bishop's house was nominated in 1977 for the National Register of Historic Places. According to the nomination paperwork, the house features a "two and one half story frame building with mansard roof". Special features to Bishop's house include carved wooden front doors and stained glass in two of the window bays. The home is part of the Woodland Park District, an island within the Historic Hill District of St. Paul.

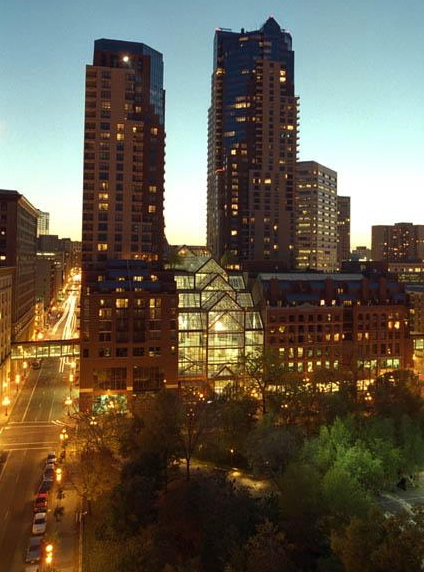
The Cray Plaza (Galtier Plaza) where the Bishop Block is now located.

The Bishop Block, also known as the Sperry Building, was a Victorian architecture building built by Asher Bassford, the brother of famous St. Paul architect Edward Bassford. The building was located at 371–375 North Sibley Street in Saint Paul, Minnesota. Bassford built the structure in 1882–1883 for Bishop, who used it as a rental property and the headquarters of the Langdon, Bishop and Company railroad contracting firm. The Bishop Block housed many of St. Paul's largest companies over the years. The Bishop Block and the John Wann Building are two of the oldest structures in the Lowertown Historic District. The Bishop building was later demolished with the facade being moved halfway up the block to the north, where it was incorporated into Galtier Plaza.

== See also ==
- List of Minnesota Civil War Units
