= Lynching of Ephraim Grizzard =

African American man who was lynched in the U.S.

- Location: Woodland Street Bridge, Nashville, Tennessee, U.S.
- Date: April 30, 1892
- Attack type: Lynching

Ephraim Grizzard and Henry Grizzard were African-American brothers who were lynched in Middle Tennessee in April 1892 as suspects in the assaults on two white sisters. Henry Grizzard was hanged by a white mob on April 24 near the house of the young women in Goodlettsville, Tennessee.

Ephraim and another brother, John Grizzard, had been arrested and taken to jail in Nashville, along with two other suspects. John Grizzard and another detainee were released because there was no evidence that they had been involved in the alleged assaults. On April 29, a mob of 300 white men attempted to lynch Ephraim, but retreated after the police opened fire on them, killing two of them.

The police guards and took Ephraim Grizzard from the jail. He was dragged through the streets to the Woodland Street Bridge, where he was hanged. Members of the mob then shot his dead body more than two hundred times.

In June 2017 Ephraim Grizzard's memory was honored with a church service at Fisk University and a plaque was dedicated at St. Anselm's Episcopal Church in Nashville. An historical commemoration was planned for a week in June 2019 by "We Remember Nashville" and the Equal Justice Initiative to acknowledge the Grizzard brothers and two victims of an earlier lynching in Nashville.

== Lynching ==
In April 1892, Mollie and Rosina Bruce, two daughters of the Bruce family in Goodlettsville, Tennessee, were reportedly assaulted by several African-Americans. They were the daughters of the late Lee Bruce, a veteran of the Confederate States Army during the American Civil War. The Bruce daughters lived in Goodlettsville with their widowed mother, who served as a tollkeeper, and younger siblings.

Henry Grizzard was caught first and supposedly confessed, implicating another man named Mack Harper. Grizzard was quickly hanged by a mob at 10 AM on April 28, 1892, near Goodlettsville, which spans Davidson and Sumner counties. His brothers John and Ephraim Grizzard were both arrested and jailed as suspects in Nashville, the county seat of Davidson County. Mack Harper and Manuel Jones were also arrested, but the police soon released John Grizzard and Jones for lack of evidence. The two Bruce girls did not make a positive identification of Grizzard and Harper as their assailants.

At 10 p.m. on April 29, 1892, a mob of 300 white men from Goodlettsville went to the Nashville jail to try to take Ephraim Grizzard from jail for lynching. Governor John P. Buchanan and Adjutant General Norman went to the jail shortly before 2 a.m. A shooting occurred at 2:25 a.m.; the mob fired gunshots from outside and the police shot back from inside the building. Two white men, Charles Rear and N.D. Guthrie, were mortally wounded and died. At 2:45 a.m., Governor Buchanan asked the mob to let Grizzard be tried in a court of law. The mob dispersed shortly before 5 a.m.

At 2 p.m. on April 30, 1892, a mob of 6,000 men from 20 towns gathered in Nashville. A "wealthy merchant" from Goodlettsville gave a speech in front of the crowd, which had grown to 10,000. The mob returned to the Nashville jail, where they took Grizzard out of his cell. He was "dragged through the streets in broad daylight", and taken to the east side of the Woodland Street Bridge over the Cumberland River (near the modern-day Nissan Stadium). Grizzard was hanged and shot to death. Riddled with bullets, he was shot 200 times. His corpse was taken back to Goodlettsville, shown to the Bruce family, and burned.

A fund was set up for the Bruce family by The Daily American on May 1, 1892. One of the donors was Edmund William Cole, the president of the Nashville, Chattanooga and St. Louis Railway.

Civil rights activist Ida B. Wells investigated the lynching. She found that Ephrain Grizzard allegedly had visited one of the Bruce daughters. Wells maintains that Grizzard was punished for this interracial contact, rather than an actual assault on the daughter. She noted that a white man who was then in jail charged with raping an eight-year-old black girl was not harmed by the mob. She described Grizzard's murder as "A naked, bloody example of the blood-thirstiness of the nineteenth century civilization of the Athens of the South." She added, "No cannon nor military were called out in his defence."

On May 2, 1892, African Americans in Triune reportedly killed at least three white residents as retaliation for the Grizzard lynching.

== Legacy ==
In June 2017, the Episcopal Diocese of Tennessee Task Force on Anti-Racism and Lipscomb University's Christian Scholars' Conference organized a service, held in honor of the 1892 lynching victim Ephraim Grizzard, at the Fisk University Memorial Chapel.

It was followed by the dedication of a plaque in his memory in the St. Anselm's Episcopal Church in Nashville. This historic plaque also honors the memory of two other lynching victims: his brother Henry Grizzard, and Samuel Smith of Nolensville, Tennessee, who was killed in relation to another incident. The Grizzard brothers and Smith were three of the six blacks documented as lynched in Davidson County in the post-Reconstruction period.

According to Natasha Deane, who researched the article for St. Anselm's website on the history of the lynchings and memorial marker, issues of the Nashville Banner from the days immediately following the report of Grizzard's lynching are missing from the archive at the Nashville Public Library.

In May 2019, the Metropolitan Nashville Davidson County Community Remembrance Project (We Remember Nashville) announced its plans together with the Equal Justice Initiative to conduct several days of remembrance and education to mark the local history of lynchings of black men. Brothers Ephraim and Henry Grizzard, killed on April 30 and 24, 1892, respectively, were to be recognized with a historical marker in downtown Nashville. A second marker will be installed downtown to recognize David Jones and Jo Reed, black men who were lynched during Reconstruction, in 1872 and 1875, respectively. The year 1877 marked the withdrawal of federal troops from the South at the end of the Reconstruction era and a rise in violence of whites against blacks into the early 20th century.
