= William A. Clark (soldier) =

American Civil War Medal of Honor recipient

- Born: July 24, 1828; Pennsylvania
- Died: January 9, 1916 (aged 87); Shelbyville, Minnesota
- Burial place: Nicollet, Minnesota
- Military career
- Allegiance: United States of America
- Branch: United States Army
- Service years: 1861–1865
- Rank: Corporal
- Unit: 2nd Regiment Minnesota Volunteer Infantry
- Conflicts: American Civil War; *Battle of Chickamauga
- Awards: Medal of Honor
- Other work: lawyer, judge, politician

Corporal William A. Clark (July 24, 1828 – January 9, 1916) was an American soldier of the Civil War who, during a battle at Nolensville, Tennessee on 15 February 1863, successfully defended a wagon train. For his actions he earned the Medal of Honor. He served with the 2nd Minnesota Volunteer Infantry Regiment. He was born in Pennsylvania, lived in Shelbyville and is buried in Nicollet, Minnesota.
