= Samuel Wright (Medal of Honor) =

- Medal of Honor 1862–1895 Army version
- Born: January 20, 1828; Plympton, Massachusetts, U.S.
- Died: July 7, 1918 (aged 90); Tribune, Kansas, U.S.
- Military career
- Allegiance: United States of America
- Branch: Union Army
- Service years: 1861–1865
- Rank: Corporal
- Units: Company H, 2nd Minnesota Infantry Regiment
- Conflicts: American Civil War
- Awards: Medal of Honor

Samuel Wright (January 20, 1828 - July 7, 1918) was an American soldier who fought for the Union Army in the American Civil War. He was awarded the Medal of Honor for his actions at Nolensville defending a wagon train. Wright was born 20 January 1828 in Plympton, Massachusetts. He fought in Company H of the 2nd Minnesota Infantry during the Civil War. He died on July 7, 1918 and is buried in Maple Grove Cemetery, Wichita, Kansas.

== Medal of Honor Citation ==
For extraordinary heroism on 15 February 1863, in action at Nolensville, Tennessee. Corporal Wright was one of a detachment of 16 men who heroically defended a wagon train against the attack of 125 cavalry, repulsed the attack and saved the train.

Date Issued: 11 September 1897.
