= John Vale =

- Born: September 9, 1835; London, England
- Died: February 4, 1909 (aged 73); Davenport, Iowa, US
- Burial place: Oakdale Memorial Gardens
- Military career
- Allegiance: United States; Union
- Branch: United States Army; Union Army
- Service years: 1861–1865
- Rank: Sergeant
- Units: Company H, 2nd Minnesota Volunteer Infantry
- Conflicts: American Civil War
- Awards: Medal of Honor

John Vale (August 9, 1835 – February 4, 1909) was a member of the Union Army during the American Civil War. He received the Medal of Honor in 1897 for his bravery on February 15, 1863, at Nolensville, Tennessee.

== Biography ==
=== Early life ===
Born in London, England, Vale grew up in the city and was employed as a store clerk at the age of 13. In 1851 he immigrated to Le Claire, Iowa, and found employment in a sawmill. He moved to farmland he purchased near Mapleton, Minnesota, in 1856. He was there when the Civil War started.

=== Military service ===
Vale enlisted in the 2nd Minnesota Volunteer Infantry at Rochester, Minnesota, on July 15, 1861. Sixteen members from Company H, of which he was a member, were foraging near the town of Nolensville, Tennessee, on February 15, 1863. Vale, then a Private, was assigned to picket duty. He watched for the Confederates as others searched farm buildings. He warned the others as 125 Confederate cavalry attacked the small detachment of Union soldiers. The Union soldiers moved to a log building for cover and returned fire. The 1st East-Tennessee Cavalry drove the confederates off. Three Union soldiers were wounded, while five Confederates were wounded. Four of the Confederate's horses were killed, three horses were captured, and they also lost seven saddles and three guns.

Vale was later promoted to Corporal and then to Sergeant. He re-enlisted as a Veteran Volunteer on December 15, 1863, and was discharged from the army on July 11, 1865.

=== Later life and death ===
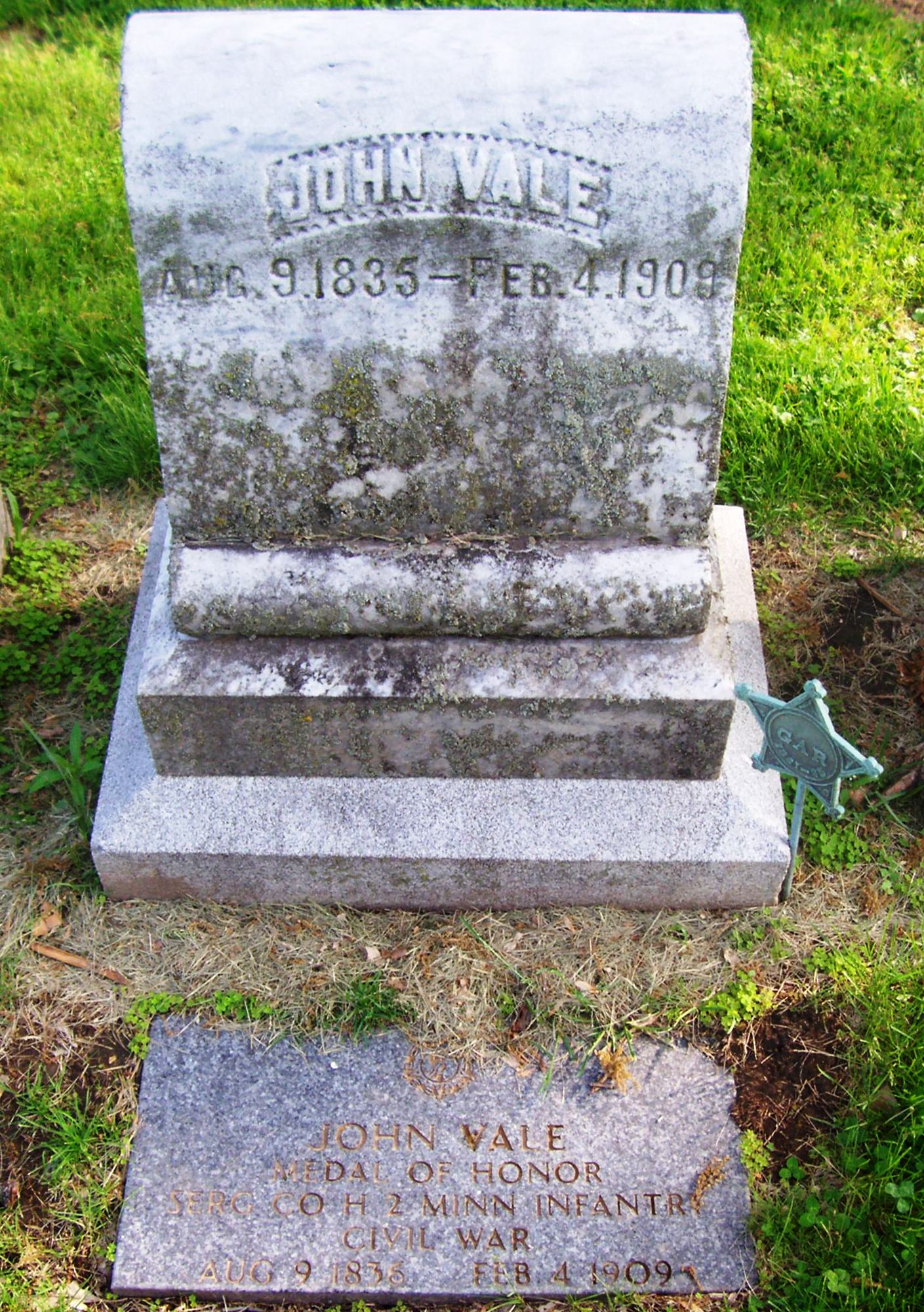
Grave in Oakdale Cemetery

After the war, Vale returned to the Rochester area. In 1869 he returned to Scott County, Iowa, and initially farmed there. He was appointed as the chief mailing clerk for the Davenport post office in 1873 and worked there for the next 26 years.

Vale married May Middleton in 1881, and she died two years later. In 1888 he married Margaret J. Peters, and they raised two children. He was a member of various lodges and active in the Grand Army of the Republic. After he retired in 1899 he remained in Davenport. He died February 4, 1909, and was buried in Oakdale Cemetery.

== Medal of Honor citation ==
Rank and Organization: Private, Company H, 2d Minnesota Infantry. Place and Date: At Nolensville, Tenn., 15 February 1863. Entered Service At: Rochester, Minn. Birth: England. Date Of Issue: 11 September 1897.

Was one of a detachment of 16 men who heroically defended a wagon train against the attack of 125 cavalry, repulsed the attack and saved the train.

== See also ==
- List of Medal of Honor recipients
- List of American Civil War Medal of Honor recipients: T–Z
