= Lynching of Samuel Smith =

African American who was lynched in the U.S.

- Location: Frank Hill Road, Nolensville, Tennessee
- Date: December 15, 1924
- Attack type: Lynching
- Weapons: hanging and gunshots
- Victim: Samuel Smith
- Charges: shooting and wounding a white man

Samuel Smith was a 15-year-old African-American youth who was lynched by a white mob, hanged and shot in Nolensville, Tennessee, on December 15, 1924. No one was ever convicted of the lynching.

Smith's memory was honored in June 2017 with a plaque at St. Anselm Episcopal Church in Nashville; two other lynching victims from Nashville have also been memorialized there.

== Lynching ==
Nolensville is about 22 miles from Nashville. At 1 a.m. on December 13, 1924, a white grocer named Ike Eastwood reportedly heard noises outside his house, grabbed a gun, and found an African-American man, Jim Smith, in his garage. He thought Smith was stealing spark plugs from his car. Eastwood shot Smith, but the man was joined by his nephew, Samuel Smith, age 15, who shot and wounded Eastwood. The grocer fired back, wounding the younger Smith as well.

Samuel Smith ran away, and tried to hitch-hike to Nashville. The next morning, Sam Smith was arrested 100 yards from Eastwood's house. The police took him to Nashville's General Hospital for treatment, where he was chained to his bed. His uncle Jim Smith was captured by police at the garage, and was taken to the county jail.

At midnight on December 15, 1924, Samuel Smith was seized by a group of six or seven masked and armed men from his hospital room in Nashville. They were joined by a larger masked mob outside the hospital. Smith was taken to Frank Hill Road in Nolensville, where he had been arrested near Eastwood's house. He was stripped, hanged from a tree, and riddled with bullets. The lynching was watched by onlookers in thirty cars, many of whom shot guns as soon as Smith was hanged, before they drove away. At 12:50 a.m., an unidentified individual called The Tennessean newspaper and reported the lynching.

Smith's body was found hanging from an oak tree by W. F. Fly, a farmer who had been woken by the gunshots, at 1 a.m. Shortly after, the hospital superintendent called the police, and County Sheriff Robert Riley drove to Nolensville, where he saw the hanged and shot youth. Riley was joined by county coroner J. R. Allen, and several police officers. They left the body hanging at the scene, about 200 yards north of the Williamson county line along the Nolensville Pike. The Nashville Tennessean noted that it was reminiscent of the 1892 lynching of Ephraim Grizzard.

The lynching was denounced by Nashville Mayor Hilary Ewing Howse. Prominent city residents wrote an open letter to Governor Austin Peay and Sheriff Riley asking them to bring the perpetrators of the lynching to justice. The Nashville Chamber of Commerce offered a reward of $5,000 to identify and arrest the lynchers. Members of the Vine Street Temple condemned the lynching, and leaders of the Agora Club, an African-American club, wondered if they should encourage fellow blacks to move to other parts of the country.

An article in The Leaf-Chronicle noted, "Such open defiance and violation of law cannot escape detection unless public opinion in that community approves it. Somebody knows who did it and somebody will tell unless somebody is afraid or unwilling to tell." No one was ever convicted of the lynching. According to the Tennessee Tribune, this is "believed to be the last lynching" in the Nashville area. Fisk University Dean Reavis L. Mitchell Jr. said, "There may have been others, but there’s no public record."

== Legacy ==
In June 2017, a worship service was held at the chapel at Fisk University Memorial Chapel, entitled "Reclaiming Hope Through Remembering", in memory of lynching victims Sam Smith and brothers Ephraim and Henry Grizzard, killed in 1892. In addition, a plaque was installed in their memories in St. Anselm's Episcopal Church in Nashville. The ceremonies were related to three years of work by a diocesan task force working on policy and community discussions related to racism in Nashville. The services were open to all the public.
