= Joseph Burger (Medal of Honor) =

Austrian-American Union Army officer and politician (1848-1921)

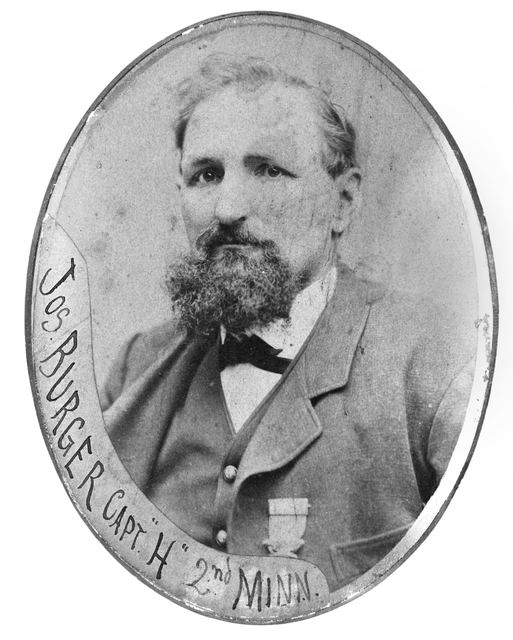
- Burger c.1881
- Born: April 16, 1848; County of Tyrol, Austrian Empire (present-day Tyrol, Austria)
- Died: January 2, 1921 (aged 72); St. Paul, Minnesota, U.S.
- Burial place: Oakland Cemetery; St. Paul, Minnesota
- Military career
- Allegiance: United States of America
- Branch: United States Army
- Service years: 1861–1865
- Rank: Private
- Unit: 2nd Regiment Minnesota Volunteer Infantry
- Awards: Medal of Honor

Joseph Burger (April 16, 1848 – January 2, 1921) was an Austrian German soldier who fought in the American Civil War. Burger received the United States' highest award for bravery during combat, the Medal of Honor, for heroism during combat at Nolensville, Tennessee on February 15, 1863, when Burger was 14 years of age. He was honored with the award on September 11, 1897.

== Biography ==
Burger was born in Tyrol, Austria on April 16, 1848. He emigrated with his parents to the United States as an infant. He was orphaned at age 6, following the death of his parents from cholera. He enlisted into the 2nd Minnesota Infantry as a drummer boy at age 13.

He was commissioned a captain at age 16, becoming one of the youngest men to attain that rank during the Civil War.

Following the war he served two terms as member of the Minnesota state legislature.

He died in St. Paul on January 2, 1921, and his remains are interred at Oakland Cemetery in Minnesota. His grandson, Warren Burger served as Chief Justice of the United States from 1969 to 1986.

== Medal of Honor citation ==
Was one of a detachment of 16 men who heroically defended a wagon train against the attack of 125 cavalry, repulsed the attack and saved the train.

== See also ==
- List of American Civil War Medal of Honor recipients: A–F
