= Charlotte Ouisconsin Clark Van Cleve =

American women's suffrage advocate and social reformer

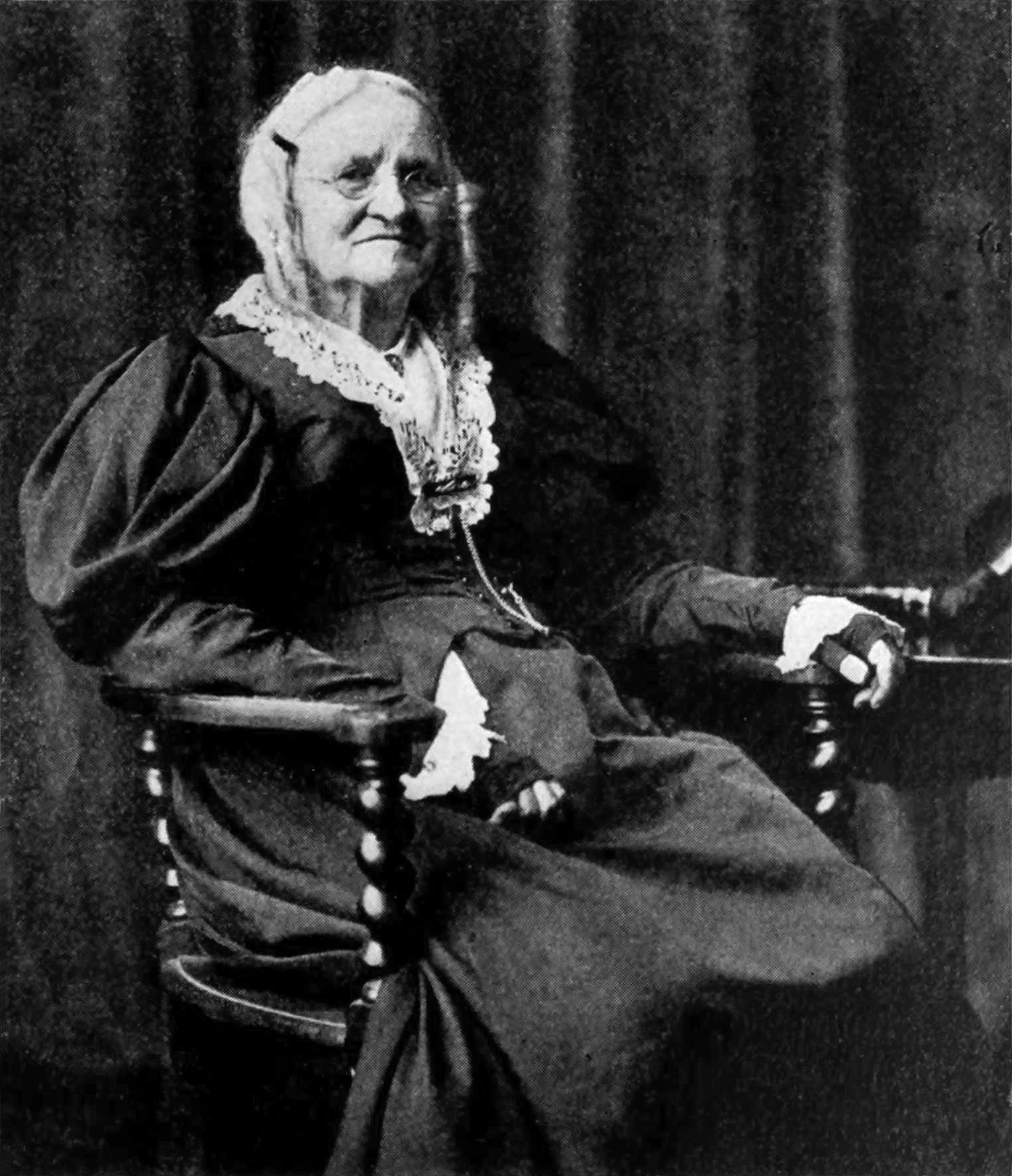
- Born: July 1, 1819; Prairie du Chien, Wisconsin
- Died: April 1, 1907 (aged 87); Minneapolis, Minnesota
- Spouse: Horatio P. Van Cleve

Charlotte Ouisconsin Clark Van Cleve (July 1, 1819 – April 1, 1907) was an American women's suffrage advocate and social reformer during the early history of Minnesota, and the first woman elected to the Minneapolis School Board. She was married to Major-General Horatio P. Van Cleve. Born during her parents' journey to help build the future Fort Snelling, she lived to see a fledgling community grow into an urban center.

== Early life ==
In 1819 the U.S. government looked to protect its fur trading interests in the northwest. To do this it ordered the 5th Infantry Regiment from its headquarters in Detroit to the junction of the Mississippi and Minnesota Rivers to build a fort. On July 1 the infantry stopped to rest at Fort Crawford in Prairie du Chien (present-day Wisconsin).

A short time later a daughter was born to Lieutenant Nathan Clark and his wife, Charlotte Ann Seymour. Also named Charlotte, she came to be affectionately known as a "daughter of the fifth regiment" and was given the middle name Ouisconsin (a French spelling of Wisconsin) by its members in recognition of her birth site. The regiment continued north and arrived at the site of Fort St. Anthony (later renamed Fort Snelling) on August 23.

Having a father in the army meant that Clark moved many times throughout her childhood. She spent the first sixteen years of her life traveling from fort to fort. During that time she developed an abiding love for the military. The patriotism and altruism she learned within its confines guided her decisions throughout her life.

Clark observed many of the changes that marked the Minneapolis–Saint Paul region's growth from a rural outpost into an urban center. At Fort St. Anthony in May 1823, four-year-old Clark witnessed the arrival of the Virginia—the first steamboat ever seen that far north along the Mississippi. It carried supplies for the fort and its inhabitants. In 1862 she saw the area's first train pull its cars into the city of St. Anthony. In 1905, during the sunset of her life, Clark was driven to the fort by automobile.

== Adulthood ==
Charlotte Clark met her future husband, Lieutenant Horatio P. Van Cleve, at Fort Winnebago in Wisconsin Territory in 1833. The two married on March 22, 1836, shortly before Charlotte's seventeenth birthday. Horatio left the military to begin a life with his wife.

The couple moved between Ohio, Missouri, and Michigan over the next twenty years, but Charlotte longed for the open prairies of her childhood home. She and her family returned to Minnesota Territory in 1856, settling in Long Prairie to farm. After five years the American Civil War broke out and Horatio, then fifty-one years old, volunteered to join the fight. In July 1861 he was commissioned as colonel of the 2nd Minnesota Volunteer Infantry. The Van Cleves left Long Prairie and moved to Fort Snelling, and later St. Anthony, where they would spend the rest of their lives.

The strain of the war years aged Charlotte. Her hair prematurely grayed and her sight and hearing eventually failed. In spite of the challenges of her ailments, Charlotte remained devoted to causes that she believed in. She entered public life in 1876 as the first woman elected to the Minneapolis School Board, and used her prominence to champion women's causes.

Charlotte fiercely supported the rights of so-called "fallen women." In 1879 she helped incorporate Bethany Home and acted as its first president. The house helped women that society looked down on—generally prostitutes and unwed pregnant girls—to better their lives. Residents committed a year to the house and in turn were offered a safe place to stay and a chance to learn job skills like cooking and sewing. By 1884 Charlotte had become such a powerful voice for women's suffrage that she was named an honorary vice president of the National Woman Suffrage Association, despite having no formal involvement with the organization.

== Legacy ==
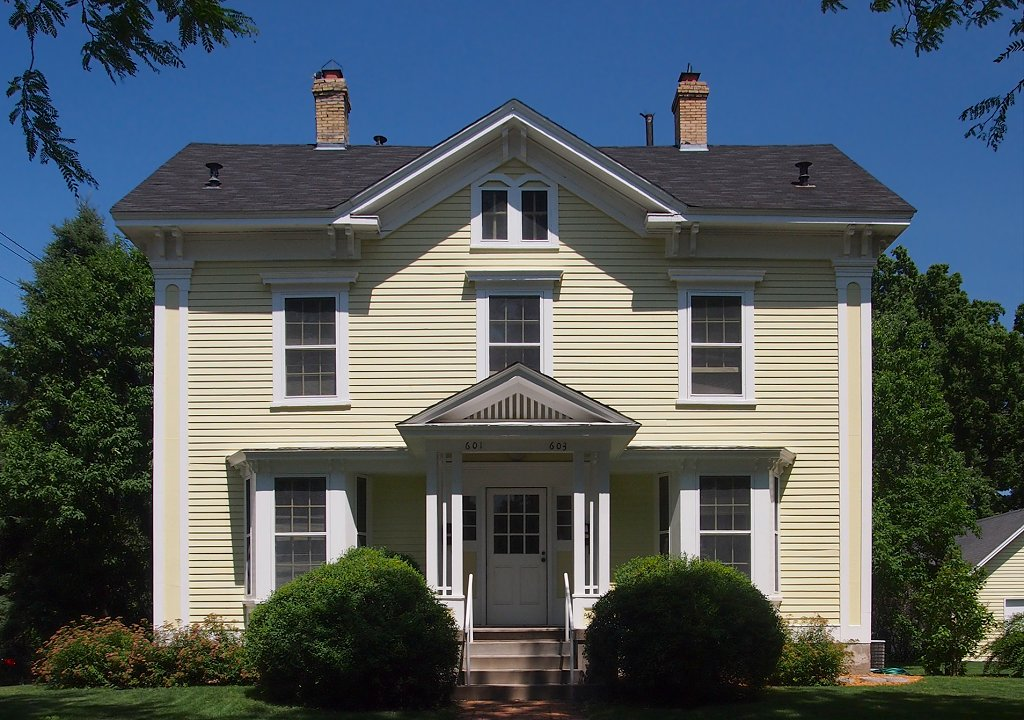
The Horatio P. Van Cleve House in Minneapolis

Horatio died in 1891 and Charlotte on April 1, 1907, just short of her eighty-eighth birthday. In February 1938 a group of senior high school girls formed the Charlotte Van Cleve Good Citizens Club in her honor. They carried on her legacy of good works, providing need-based scholarships to school children, donating to school libraries, and assisting in nursing homes.

The Horatio P. Van Cleve House, where Charlotte and her husband lived beginning in 1862, still stands in the Marcy-Holmes neighborhood of Minneapolis, Minnesota. It was added to the National Register of Historic Places in 1976 in part for her accomplishments.
