= Lovilo N. Holmes =

American military officer

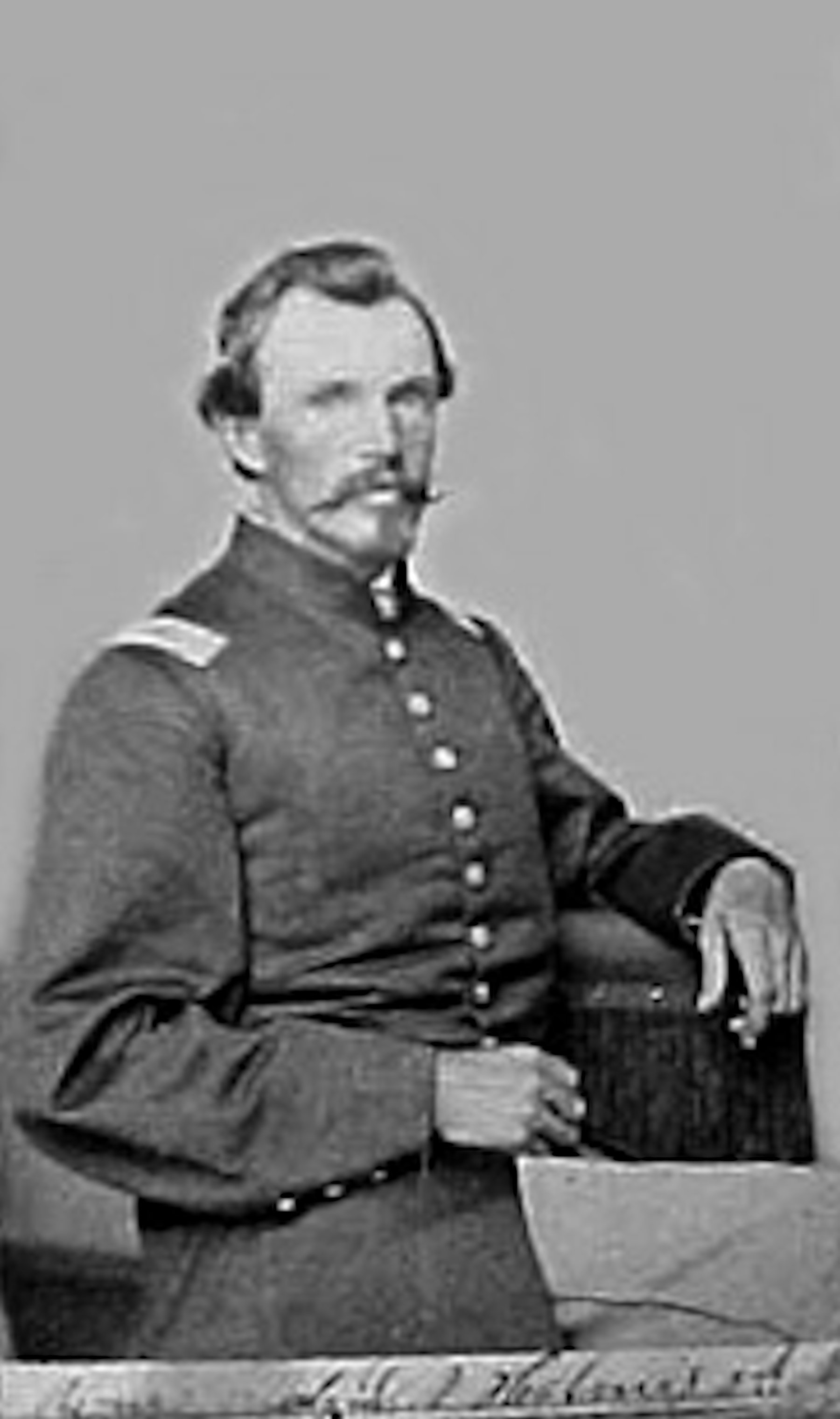
- Holmes in 1865
- Born: October 10, 1830; Farmersville, New York, US
- Died: May 7, 1914 (aged 83); Mankato, Minnesota, US
- Burial place: Glenwood Cemetery; Mankato, Massachusetts, US
- Military career
- Allegiance: United States of America
- Branch: United States Army; Union Army
- Rank: First Sergeant
- Unit: 2nd Minnesota Volunteer Infantry Regiment
- Awards: Medal of Honor

Lovilo N. Holmes (October 10, 1830 – May 7, 1914) was an American soldier in the Union Army and recipient of the Medal of Honor during the American Civil War.

== Biography ==
Holmes was born in Farmersville, New York, in 1830. During the Civil War he served as a First Sergeant in Company H of the 2nd Minnesota Volunteer Infantry Regiment. His medal was for actions at Nolensville, Tennessee on February 15, 1863. His citation reads "Was one of a detachment of 16 men who heroically defended a wagon train against the attack of 125 cavalry, repulsed the attack and saved the train." The medal was presented on September 11, 1897. Holmes died in 1914 and is now buried in Glenwood Cemetery in Mankato, Minnesota.
