= James Flannigan (Medal of Honor) =

Soldier fought in the American Civil War

James Flanagan
- Born: c. 1833; British North America
- Died: October 4, 1905; Louisville, New York
- Burial place: Saint Lawrence Cemetery
- Military career
- Allegiance: United States of America
- Branch: United States Army
- Rank: Private
- Units: Company H, 2nd Minnesota Volunteer Infantry Regiment
- Awards: Medal of Honor

Private James Flanagan (c. 1833 – October 4, 1905) was a soldier who fought in the American Civil War. Flanagan received the United States' highest award for bravery during combat, the Medal of Honor, for his action at Nolensville, Tennessee on 15 February 1863. He was honored with the award on 11 September 1897.

== Biography ==
Flannigan was born in British North America in 1833. He enlisted into the 2nd Minnesota Infantry. He died on 4 October 1905 and his remains are interred at the Saint Lawrence Cemetery in Louisville, New York.

== Medal of Honor citation ==
The President of the United States of America, in the name of Congress, takes pleasure in presenting the Medal of Honor to Private James Flannigan, United States Army, for extraordinary heroism on 15 February 1863, while serving with Company H, 2d Minnesota Infantry, in action at Nolensville, Tennessee. Private Flannigan was one of a detachment of 16 men who heroically defended a wagon train against the attack of 125 cavalry, repulsed the attack and saved the train.

== See also ==
- List of American Civil War Medal of Honor recipients: A–F
