= Horatio P. Van Cleve =

Horatio Phillips Van Cleve
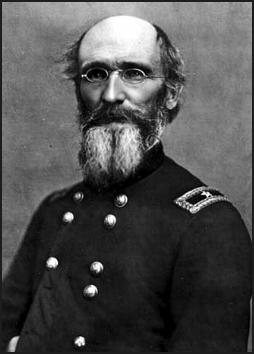
- Born: November 23, 1809; Princeton, New Jersey, U.S.
- Died: April 24, 1891 (aged 81); Minneapolis, Minnesota, U.S.
- Burial place: Lakewood Cemetery, Minneapolis, Minnesota, U.S.
- Military career
- Allegiance: United States; Union
- Branch: United States Army; Union Army
- Service years: 1831-1836, 1861-1865
- Rank: Brigadier General; Brevet Major General
- Commands: 2nd Minnesota Volunteer Infantry
- Conflicts: American Civil War; Battle of Mill Springs; Siege of Corinth; Battle of Perryville; Battle of Stones River; Battle of Chickamauga; Battle of Wilkinson Pike

Horatio Phillips Van Cleve (November 23, 1809 – April 24, 1891) was a general in the Union Army during the American Civil War.

== Early life ==
Van Cleve was born in Princeton, New Jersey. He studied for two years at Princeton University, and then entered the United States Military Academy. He graduated in 1831 and served at frontier posts in the Michigan Territory. He was commissioned as a second lieutenant of infantry on December 31, 1831. He resigned from the Army on September 11, 1836, and settled in Michigan. He taught in Cincinnati, Ohio, in 1840–41, and then engaged in farming near Ann Arbor, Michigan. Van Cleve was an engineer in the service of the state of Michigan in 1855, and then United States Surveyor of Public Lands in Minnesota. In 1856, he engaged in stock-raising.

== Civil War ==
After the start of the Civil War, he was commissioned as colonel of the 2nd Minnesota Volunteer Infantry Regiment on July 22, 1861. He met wife Charlotte Ouisconsin Clark Van Cleve, at Fort Winnebago, while both her father and Horatio were stationed there. She would write the book Three Score Years and Ten, Life-Long Memories of Fort Snelling, Minnesota, and Other Parts of the West, about the early days of Fort Snelling and her travels through the pioneer midwest. She was the first white woman born in the Wisconsin Territory, in the settlement of Prairie du Chien.

Van Cleve served under Maj. Gen. George H. Thomas at Mill Springs, and was later promoted to brigadier general of volunteers on March 21, 1862, in recognition for his services at that battle. He commanded a brigade at the siege of Corinth and a division at Perryville. He was disabled by a wound at Stones River, but returned to his division upon recovery. He fought at Chickamauga, and was in command of the post and forces at Murfreesboro, Tennessee, after the battle. He was in command of the defenses of the Nashville and Chattanooga Railroad until he was mustered out in 1865. In the omnibus promotions in 1866 following the war, he was brevetted major general, dating from March 13, 1865.

== Postbellum life ==
He was the Adjutant General of Minnesota in 1866–70 and 1876–82.

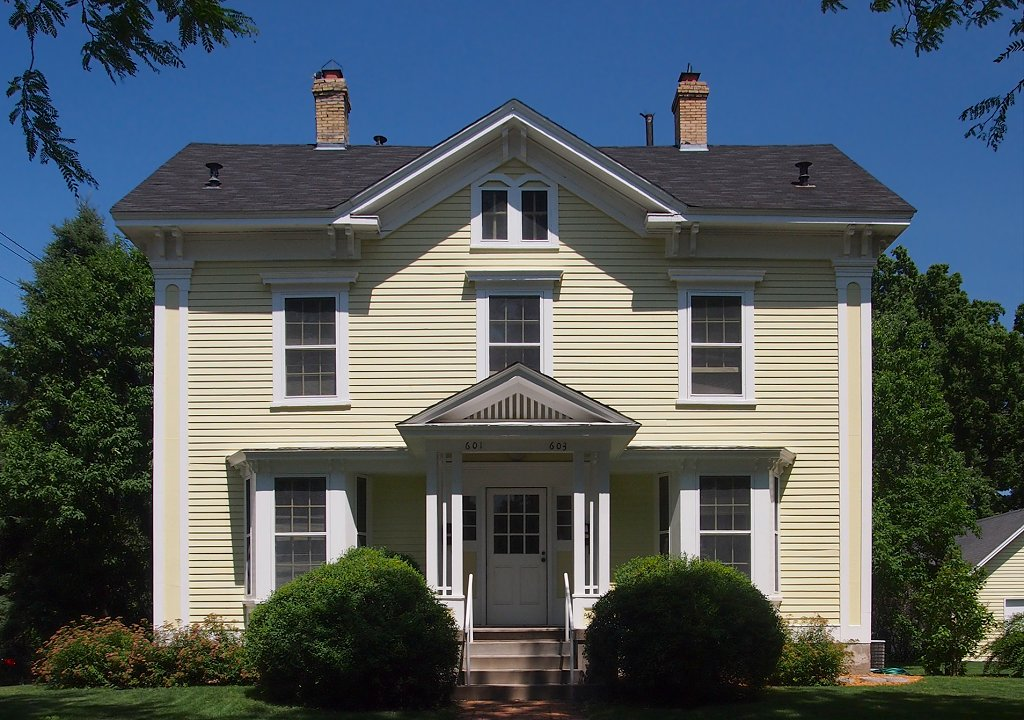
The Horatio P. Van Cleve House in Minneapolis

Van Cleve died in Minneapolis, Minnesota on April 24, 1891, and is buried there in Lakewood Cemetery. His home in that city was added to the National Register of Historic Places in 1976. He had his favorite horse buried in the front yard of that house before he died.

A park in Minneapolis is named in his honor. (44°59'10"N 93°13'50"W)

== See also ==
- List of American Civil War generals (Union)
