= Nolensville, Tennessee =

- Town
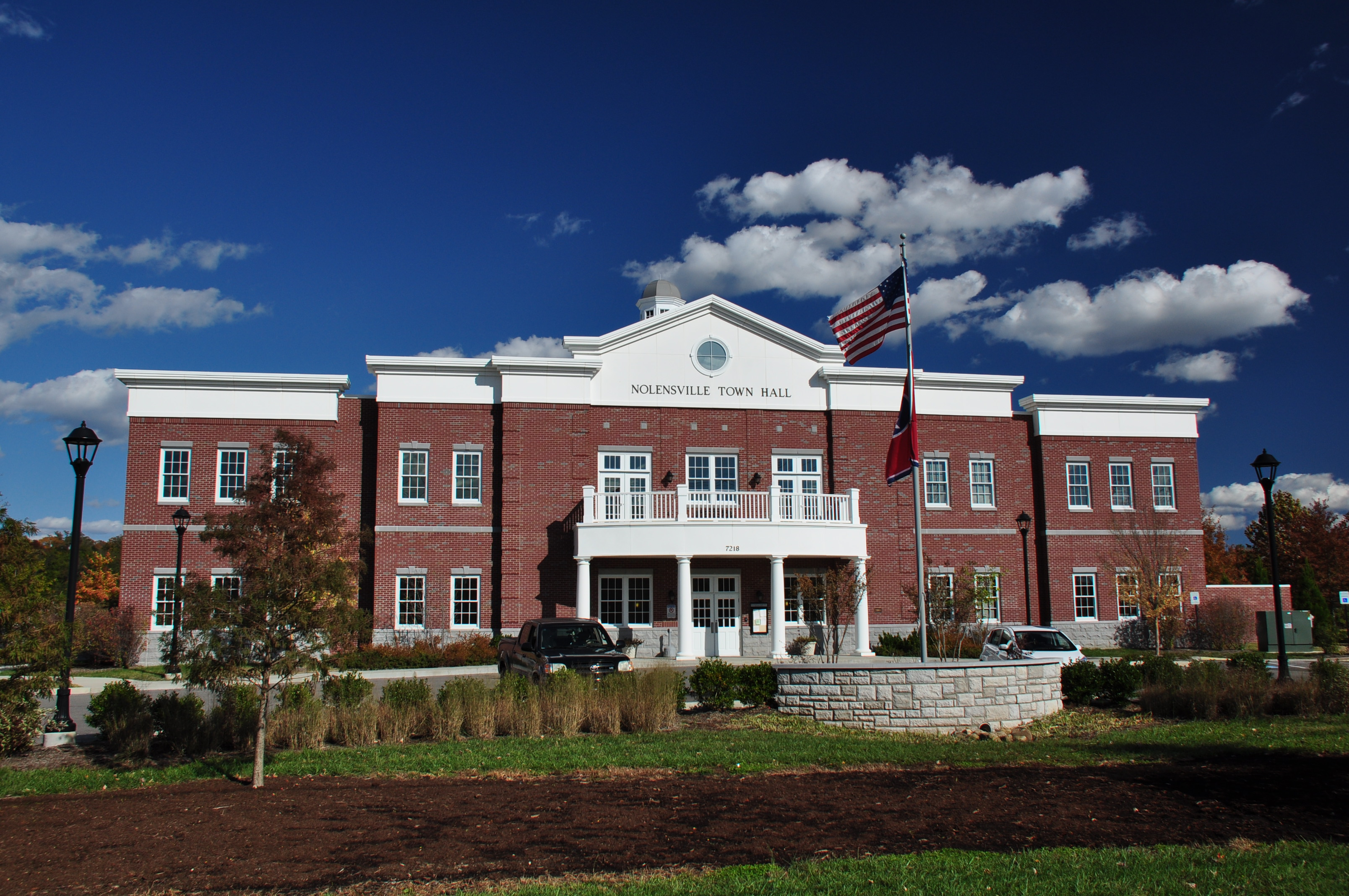
- Nolensville Town Hall in November 2013.

- Seal

- Location of Nolensville in Williamson County, Tennessee.
- Coordinates: 35°57′24″N 86°40′1″W
- Country: United States
- State: Tennessee
- County: Williamson
- Settled: 1797
- Incorporated: 1996
- Named for: William Nolen (early settler)

Area
  - Total: 10.44 sq mi (27.05 km^{2})
  - Land: 10.44 sq mi (27.05 km^{2})
  - Water: 0 sq mi (0.00 km^{2})
- Elevation: 620 ft (190 m)

Population (2020)
  - Total: 13,829
  - Density: 1,324.2/sq mi (511.26/km^{2})
- Time zone: UTC-6 (Central (CST))
  - Summer (DST): UTC-5 (CDT)
- ZIP code: 37135
- Area code: 615
- FIPS code: 47-53460
- GNIS feature ID: 1295807
- Website: www.nolensvilletn.gov

Nolensville is a town in Williamson County, Tennessee. Its population was 13,829 at the 2020 census. It was established in 1797 by William Nolen, a veteran of the American Revolutionary War. Located in Middle Tennessee, it is about 22 miles southeast of Nashville. The town was reincorporated to the state in 1996.

== Geography ==
Nolensville is located at 35°57′24″N 86°40′1″W (35.956786, -86.666967).

According to the United States Census Bureau, the town has a total area of 10.44 square miles (27.0 km^{2}), consisting entirely of land. It is mostly flat, although there are a few hilly areas.

== History ==
This area was settled by European Americans after the American Revolutionary War, when pioneers began to move west of the Appalachian Mountains. William Nolen, a war veteran, his wife, Sarah, and their five children were passing through the area in 1797 when their wagon wheel broke (The town's nickname is now called "Broken wheel town". Surveying his surroundings, Nolen noted the rich soil and abundance of natural resources. He decided to settle here and the community was later named for him as Nolensville. William Nolen purchased a portion of a land grant made to Jason Thompson, on which Nolensville later developed. Nolen's historic house was moved to a new location in 2009.

In the early 19th century, a large migration from Rockingham, North Carolina, brought the Adams, Allen, Barnes, Cyrus, Fields, Glenn, Irion, Johnson, Peay, Scales, Taylor, Vernon, Wisener, Williams, and other families to the area. Built along Mill Creek, the town was incorporated in 1839.

Foraging and skirmishing took place here during the Civil War. Gen. John Wharton's Confederate cavalry unit was stationed in town briefly and Gen. Joseph Wheeler's command captured a Union supply train here on December 30, 1862. A small group of soldiers from the 2nd Minnesota Volunteer Infantry successfully defended a Union wagon train against a much larger Confederate cavalry force in February 1863, with several of them earning the Medal of Honor for their actions.

From the post-Reconstruction period into the early 20th century, Whites lynched a total of five African Americans in Williamson County. They did not allow the legal system to prosecute these men, but conducted extrajudicial murder. Among the victims was 15-year-old Samuel Smith, an African American who was lynched in Nolensville in December 1924. He was arrested there for shooting and wounding Ike Eastwood at his house, after Eastwood shot Smith's uncle; the grocer also shot and wounded Smith. Smith was taken for treatment to a hospital in Nashville. A group of masked men took him from the hospital, and with a larger mob, back 22 miles to Nolensville. There, the mob hanged the youth near Eastwood's house and shot him multiple times. Although the Nashville Chamber of Commerce offered a $5000 reward in the case, no one was convicted of Smith's murder. On June 5, 2017, a plaque was installed in his memory at St. Anselm Episcopal Church in Nashville; it memorialized two other local lynching victims, as well.

=== Post-World War II to present ===
On both sides of Nolensville Road, from north of Oldham Drive to the south as far as York/Williams Road, are many structures from the 19th century that are still in use as homes and/or stores. The Home Place Bed and Breakfast was built in 1820 as a private residence. Within the described area above is a historic section, which in the 19th century was the center of Nolensville. Of note are the Waller Funeral Home, built in 1876; the Nolensville Mill Company, which operated from 1890 to 1986 (today it houses a store featuring Amish goods); and the Nolensville Co-Op Creamery, which operated from 1921 to 1957. Now serving as an antique store, the creamery had produced butter known for its excellence throughout the area. The house north of the cemetery today serves as a veterinary clinic.

Nolensville voted by referendum to reincorporate in August 1996. In October 1996, the first election was held, electing the first three-member Nolensville board of mayor and aldermen. The first mayor of Nolensville was Charles F. Knapper, elected along with Aldermen Thomas "Tommy" Dugger, III, and Parman Henry. The town for the first time hired a town attorney, Robert J. Notestine, III.

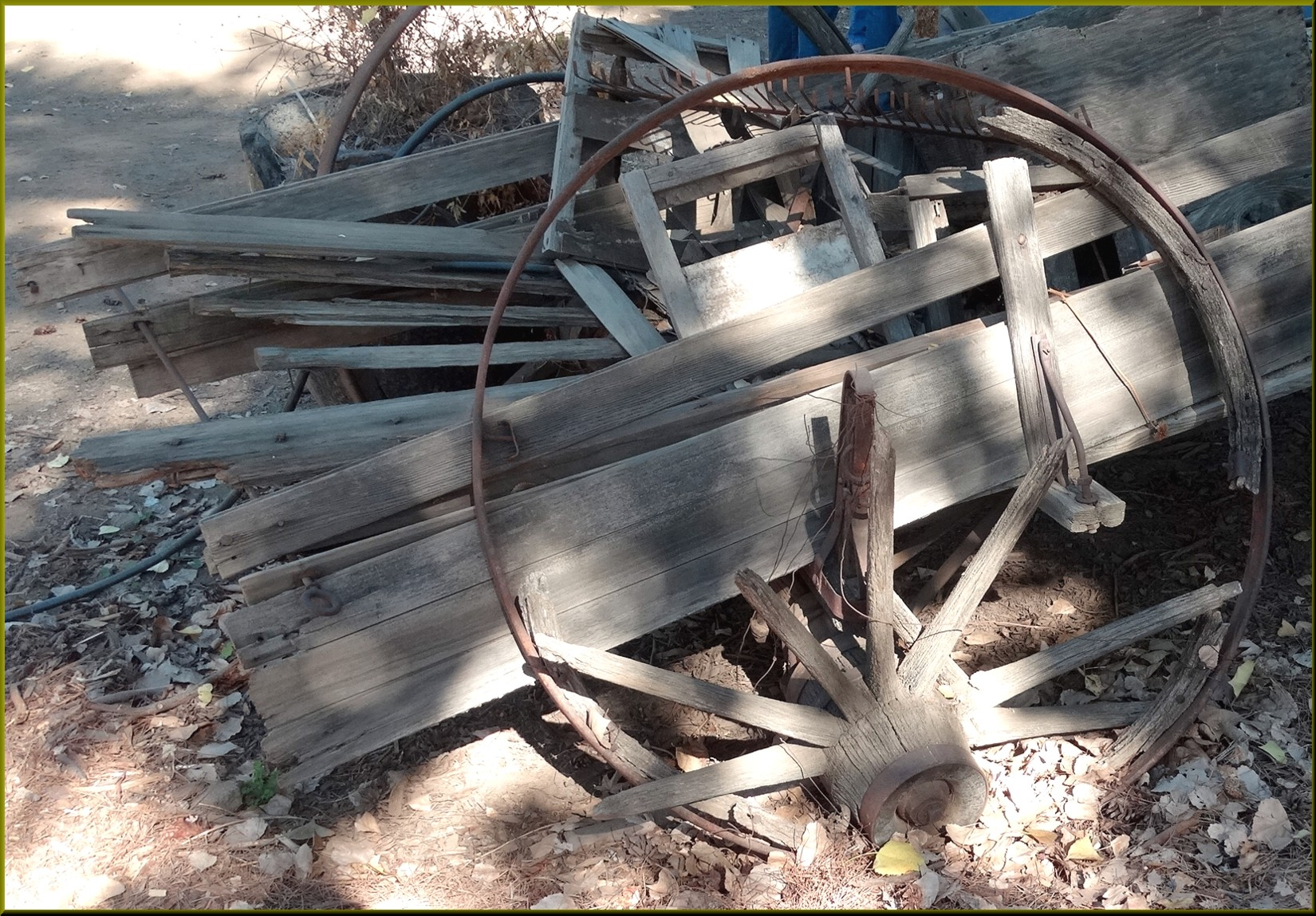
Broken wheel (Not the actual one)

Since 1996, Nolensville has had sustained growth. New home developments have been built around the town, including Bent Creek, Winterset Woods, Burkitt Place, Silver Stream, Ballenger Farms, Sunset Farms, and Summerlyn. Nolensville has had 290 residential building permits since the 2010 census; it boasts of having the lowest property tax rates in Williamson County. Other signs of growth are the new multimillion-dollar town hall, proposals for multiuse developments, and a high level of investment in commercial real estate.

To accommodate the many new students brought by families settling in the area, the Williamson County School Board purchased 95 acres (38 ha) on the south side of Nolensville for the construction of new elementary, middle, and high schools. These opened in the fall of 2016.

== Demographics ==
Historical population
Census	Pop.	Note	%±
1880	145		—
1990	1,570		—
2000	3,099		97.4%
2010	5,861		89.1%
2020	13,829		135.9%
2025 (est.)	15,789	▲	14.2%
Sources: Note: For Census-designated place in 1990

=== 2020 census ===
As of the 2020 census, Nolensville had a population of 13,829. The median age was 35.6 years. 35.3% of residents were under the age of 18 and 7.5% of residents were 65 years of age or older. For every 100 females there were 97.8 males, and for every 100 females age 18 and over there were 93.3 males age 18 and over.

96.1% of residents lived in urban areas, while 3.9% lived in rural areas.

There were 4,089 households in Nolensville, of which 62.1% had children under the age of 18 living in them. Of all households, 80.8% were married-couple households, 5.2% were households with a male householder and no spouse or partner present, and 11.9% were households with a female householder and no spouse or partner present. About 6.9% of all households were made up of individuals and 3.3% had someone living alone who was 65 years of age or older.

There were 4,216 housing units, of which 3.0% were vacant. The homeowner vacancy rate was 1.2% and the rental vacancy rate was 6.4%.

Racial composition as of the 2020 census
Race	Number	Percent
White	11,017	79.7%
Black or African American	752	5.4%
American Indian and Alaska Native	13	0.1%
Asian	907	6.6%
Native Hawaiian and Other Pacific Islander	11	0.1%
Some other race	139	1.0%
Two or more races	990	7.2%
Hispanic or Latino (of any race)	705	5.1%

=== Demographic estimates ===
U.S. Census Bureau QuickFacts reports that Nolensville had 2,164 families.

=== 2010 census ===
As of the census of 2010, 5,861 people in 1,831 households lived there. The racial makeup of the town was 85.5% White, 5.3% African American, 0.2% Native American, 6.3% Asian, 0.6% from other races, and 2.1% from two or more races. Hispanics or Latinos of any race were 2.8% of the population.

About 77.1% of households were married couples living together, and 9.6% were not families; 8.3% of all households were made up of individuals. The average household size was 3.25, and the average family size was 3.45.

In the town, the age distribution was 41.9% under 18, 1.8% from 18 to 24, 27.3% from 25 to 44, 23.7% from 45 to 64, and 5.3% who were 65 or older. The median age was 33 years. For every 100 females, there were 93.5 males.

The median income for a household in the town was $102,982, and for a family was $105,589. Males had a median income of $71,114 versus $36,190 for females. The per capita income for the town was $33,705. About 4.5% of families and 5.2% of the population were below the poverty line, including 4.7% of those under 18 and none of those age 65 or over.

=== Population Growth ===
There has been a very large boom in population in almost all of middle Tennessee, especially in the town of Nolensville. The predicted population for Nolensville by 2030 is ~19000 people. Nolensville is expected to be the 38th largest city in all of Tennessee based on population alone.

=== List of Rankings for Nolensville ===
Total Population	# 38	93rd
Population Density	# 23	96th
Median Household Income	# 6	99th
Housing Affordability Index	# 179	36th
Per Capita Income	# 18	97th
Diversity Index	# 98	81st

As of July 1st 2025, this is the list of Nolensville's ranking in Tennessee based on many sources.

== Education and schools ==
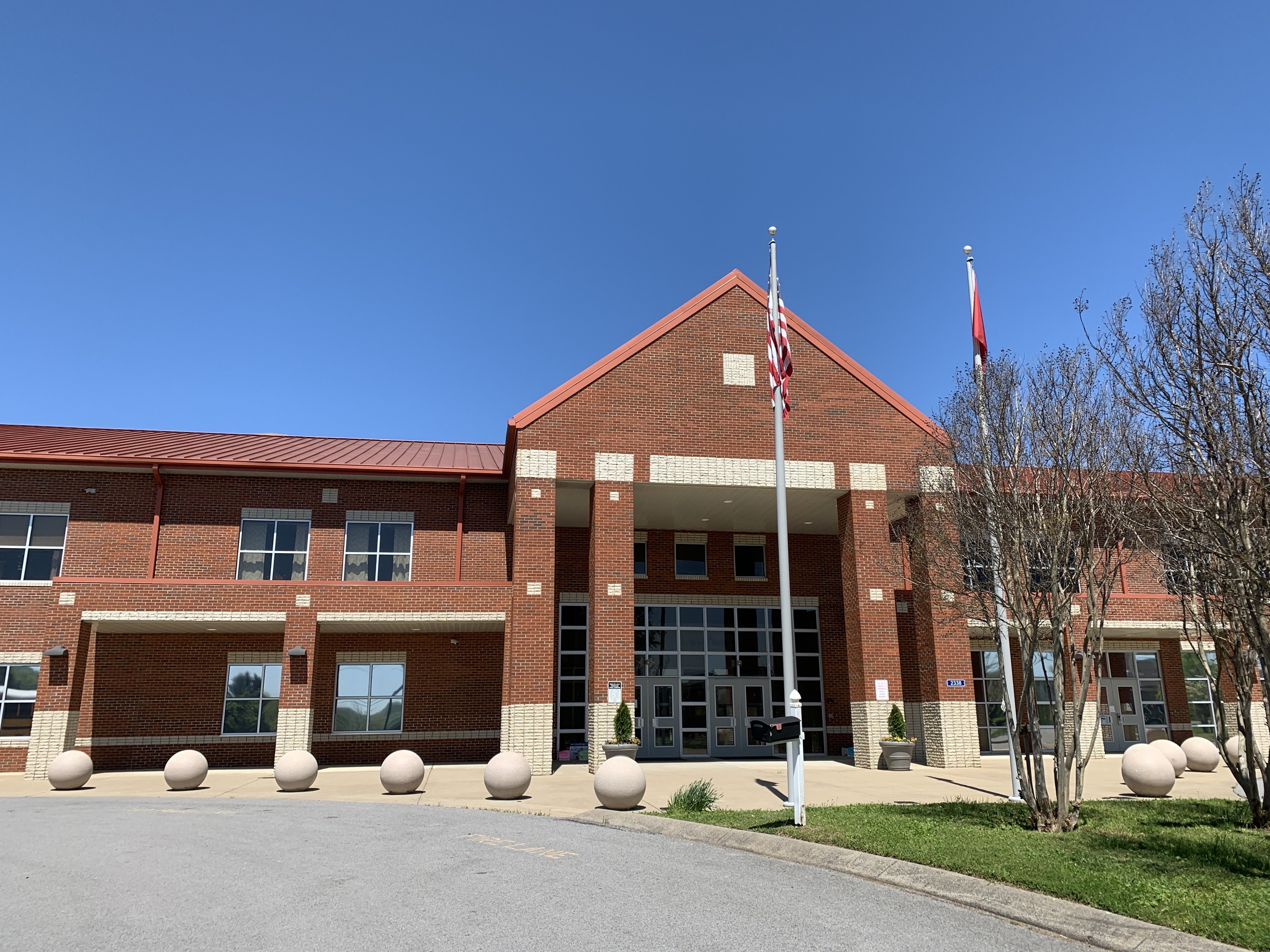
Nolensville Elementary School

Nolensville area schools include:

- Nolensville Elementary School
- Mill Creek Elementary School
- Sunset Elementary School
- Sunset Middle School
- Mill Creek Middle School
- Nolensville High School
- St. Michael Academy

== Recreation ==
Nolensville has two public parks, an indoor recreation center, an outdoor pool/splash pad, and an extensive trail system. These facilities host a variety of different organized activities, including youth sports leagues, fitness classes, and town holiday celebrations. Work on a new park near Sunset Elementary School and Sunset Middle School has begun. The name of the park is Chrismon Brown park.

== Little League World Series ==
Little League teams from Nolensville participated in the 2021, 2022 and 2023 Little League World Series, thus becoming, respectively, the 9th, 10th and 11th teams to qualify in Tennessee history. The 2022 team finished in fourth place out of a 20-team field.

== Government ==
Residents of Nolensville voted to change its charter from mayor-aldermanic to manager-commissioner in the fall of 2020.The issue passed 1,910 to 731 for a total of 2,641 votes cast. Legislative power is vested in the board of commissioners, while day-to-day executive functions are handled by the town manager. The current Town Manager is Victor Lay.

Nolensville board of commissioners
Halie Gallik, mayor
Jessica Salamida, vice mayor
Derek Adams
Kate Cortner
Joel Miller

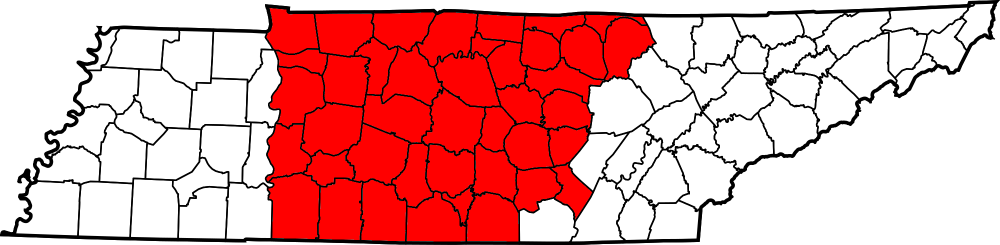
Map of Middle Tennessee

== Festivals and Events ==
Many residents of Nolensville participate in festivals and/or events. There are also many shops such as Amish markets and clothing stores. The most famous festival is the buttercup festival. The buttercup festival attracts upwards of ~120 vendors. The buttercup festival celebrates the art, music, food, & creativity of Nolensville. It almost always occurs in early May or late April. The reason it is named "The buttercup festival," because of the buttercups which are native to the area of Nolensville, this year the buttercup festival is on 2nd of may, 2026.

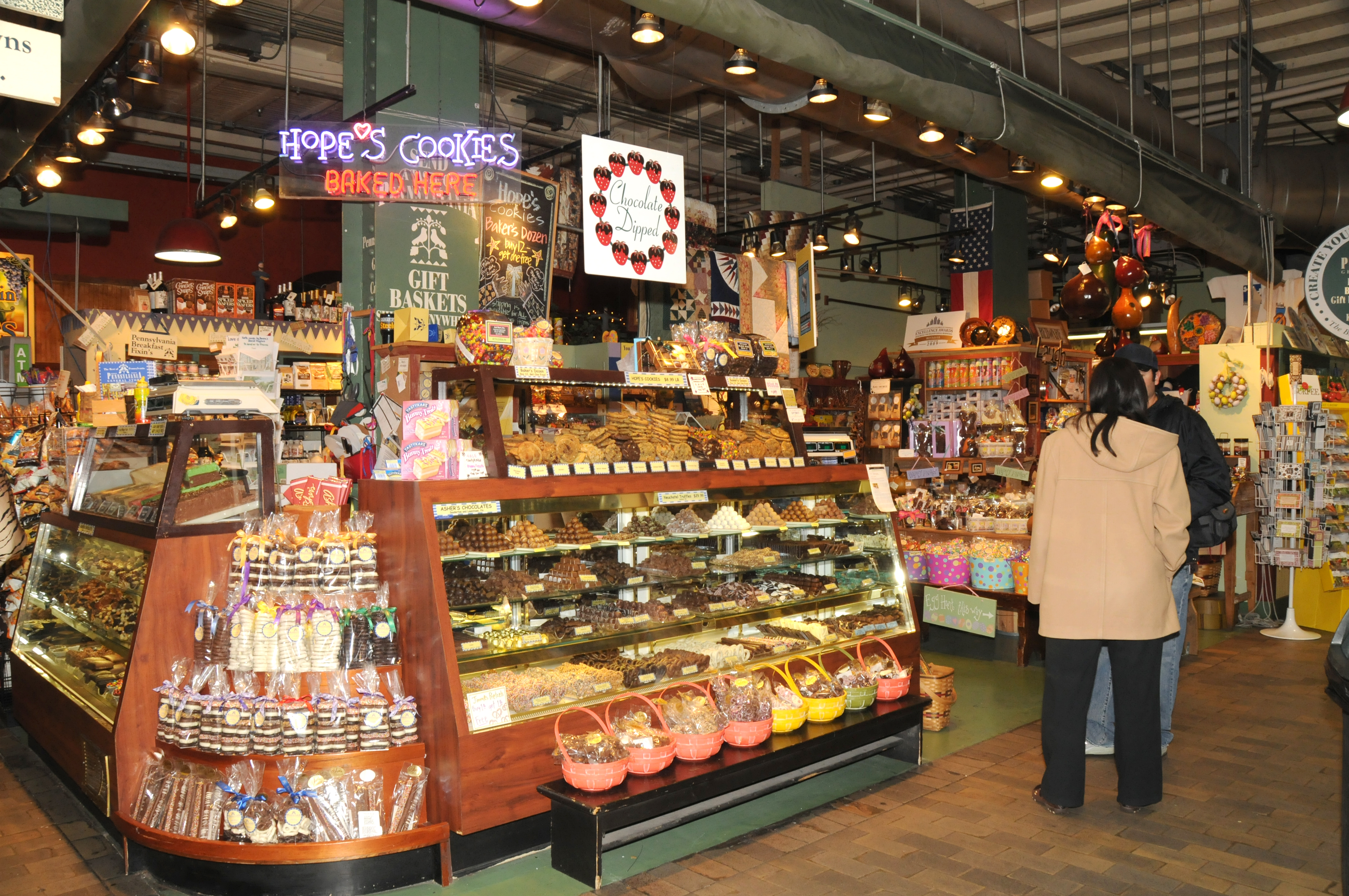
Amish market

=== History of the buttercup festival ===
The first buttercup festival was in 1915, in order to celebrate the arrival of spring. During the early 1900's, the festival was a small event, mostly only a few towns people. However, by the late 1900's to early 2000's, the festival evolved into a larger, regional event. The 2026 festival promises to be the largest one yet, including more live music, a petting zoo and games for children, and also including everything above.
