= 2nd Minnesota Infantry Regiment =

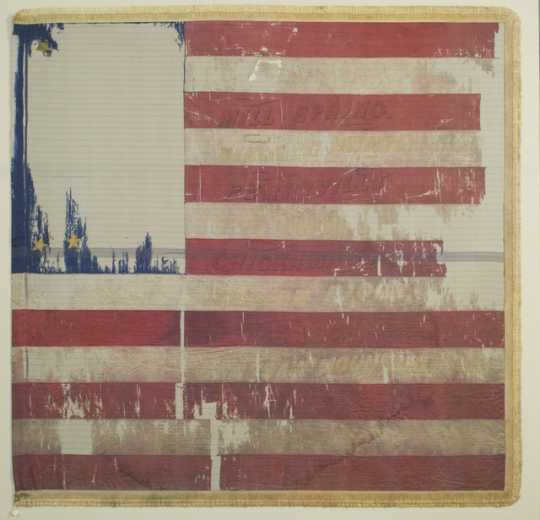
- 2nd Minnesota Infantry Regiment National Flag
- Active: June 26, 1861, to July 11, 1865
- Country: United States
- Allegiance: Union
- Branch: Infantry
- Engagements: American Civil War: Battle of Mill Springs; Shiloh Campaign; Siege of Corinth; Heartland Offensive; Battle of Perryville; Tullahoma Campaign; Battle of Hoover's Gap; Chickamauga Campaign; Battle of Chickamauga; Siege of Chattanooga; Battle of Missionary Ridge; Atlanta campaign; Battle of Resaca; Battle of Kennesaw Mountain; Siege of Atlanta; Battle of Jonesborough; Carolinas campaign; Battle of Bentonville

Commanders
- Notable commanders: Horatio P. Van Cleve; James George; Judson Wade Bishop

The 2nd Minnesota Infantry Regiment was a Minnesota USV infantry regiment that served in the Union Army during the American Civil War. The regiment went on to campaign in the south and especially distinguish itself at the battles of Mill Springs, Chickamauga, and Missionary Ridge.

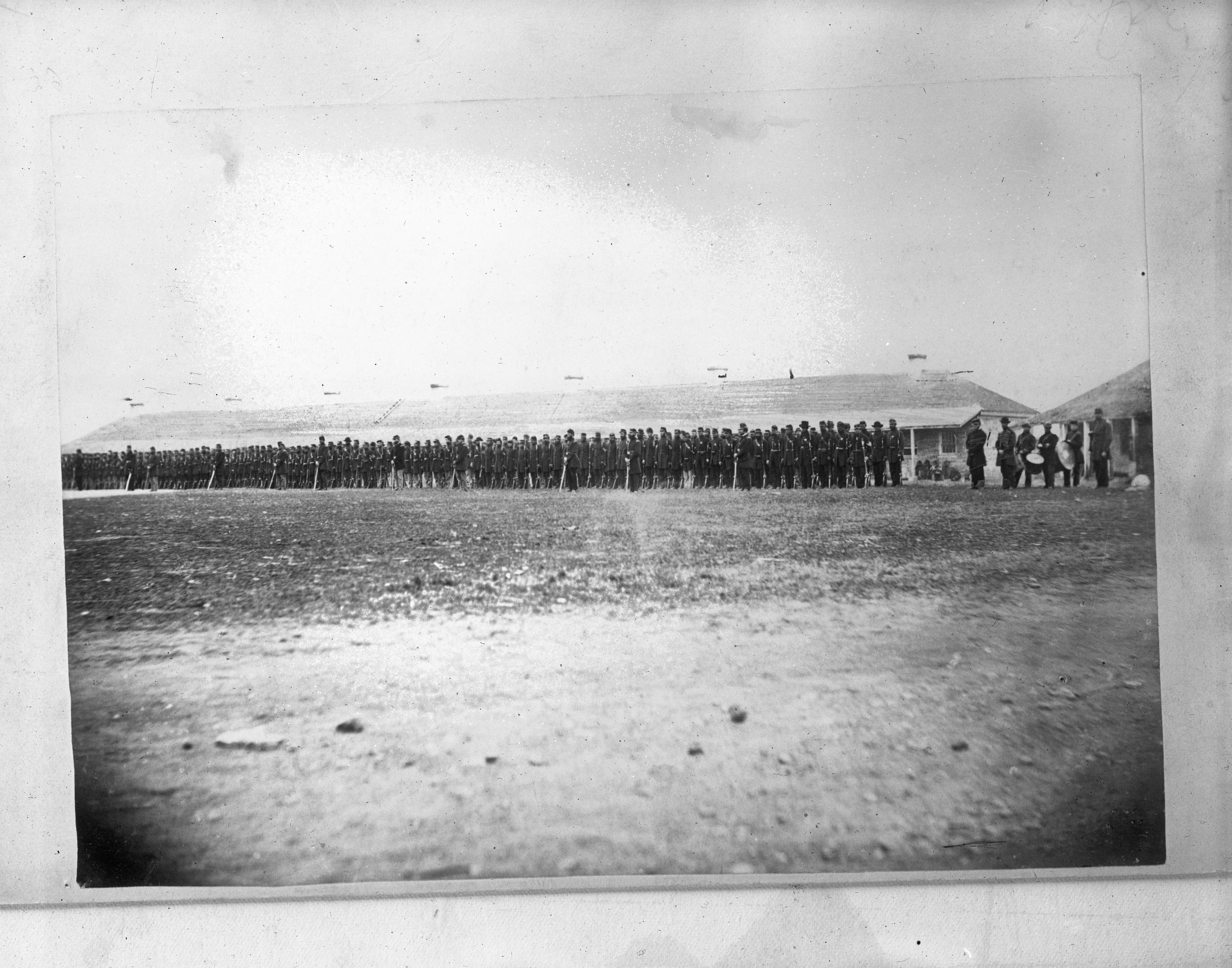
2nd Minnesota Regiment of Volunteers just before they left for the Civil War, 1861

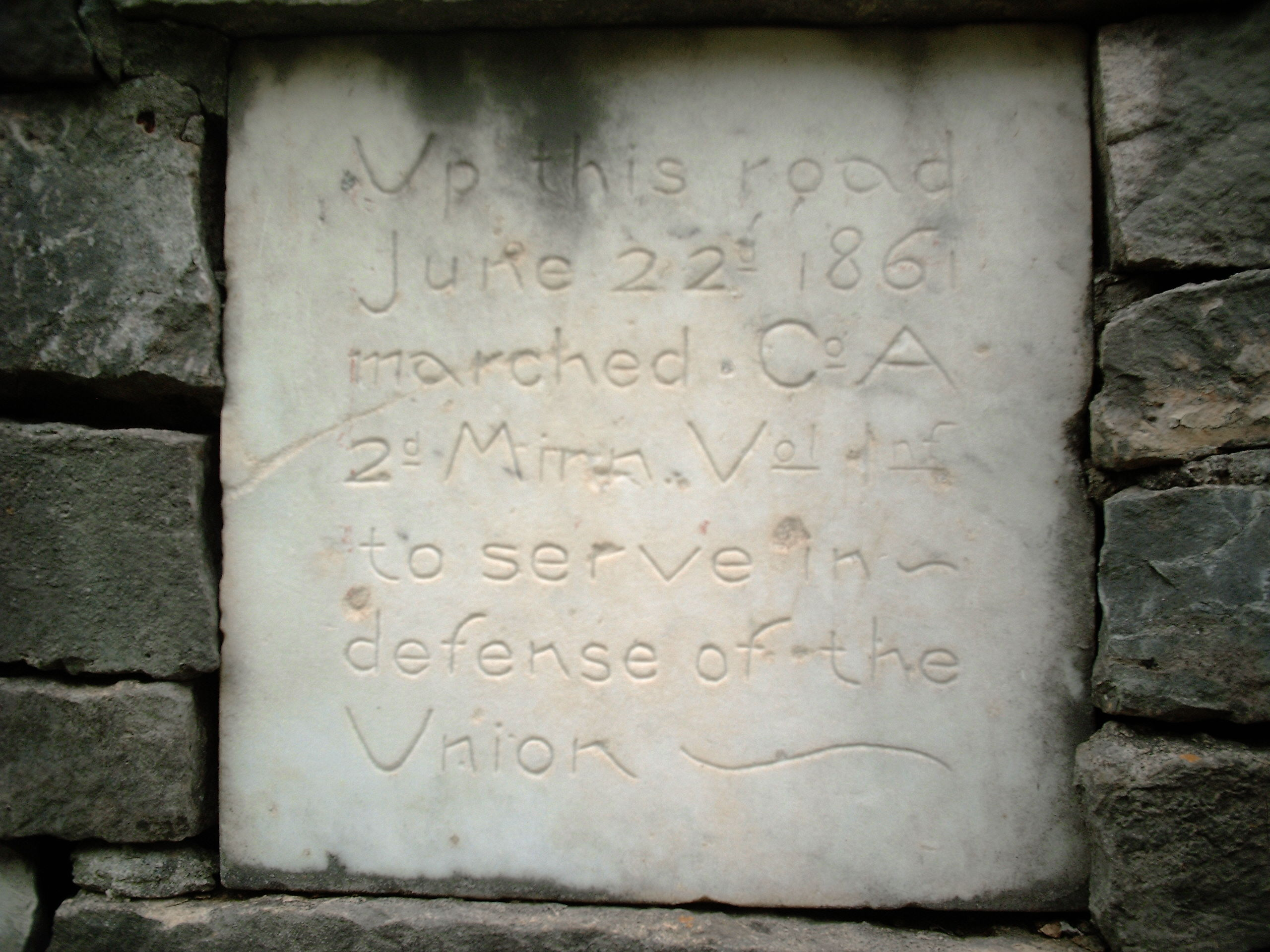
Company A memorial in Chatfield, Minnesota.

== History ==
=== Organization and early service ===
When the 1st Minnesota Infantry Regiment formed in answer for President Lincoln's call for 75,000 volunteers, the companies quickly filled beyond capacity. Thus, on June 14, 1861, a second Minnesota Infantry Regiment was announced. The regiment organized at Fort Snelling, Minnesota and mustered in by companies for three years service beginning June 26, 1861.

After muster, Companies A and F were sent to Fort Ripley. companies B and C to Fort Abercrombie, companies D and E to Fort Ridgely, and the rest remained in Fort Snelling for the time being. On July 22, Horatio P. Van Cleve was made Colonel of the 2nd Minnesota. The next few weeks were dedicated to the preparation of the regiment for service in the war.

Company Organization when mustered in 1861.
Company	Earliest Moniker	Primary Place of Recruitment	Earliest Captain
A	Chatfield Guards	Fillmore, Winona, and Olmsted Counties	Judson Wade Bishop
B	Olmsted County Volunteers or Rochester Volunteers	Olmsted County and Ramsey County	William Markham
C	Anoka Volunteers	Ramsey, Anoka, and other assorted counties	Moody C. Tolman
D	Dodge County Volunteers	Dodge County and Wabasha County	James George
E	St. Peter Guards	Nicollet County and Le Sueur County	Asgrim Knutson Skaro
F	Minnehaha Volunteers or Western Zouaves	Ramsey County and Washington County	Horace Henry Western
G	German Union Guards	Ramsey, Brown, and Hennepin Counties	Andrew K. Kiefer
H	Red Wing Volunteers	Goodhue County and surrounding area	Captain Graw
I	Blue Earth County Volunteers	Blue Earth County and Ramsey County	Nelson W. Dickerson
K	Ramsey County Volunteers	McLeod County and Ramsey County	Captain Irvine

On September 20, 1861 all companies were recalled to Fort Snelling. By the first week of October, the regiment had assembled all together for the first time, with close to 1,000 personnel. On October 14, the regiment received orders to report to Washington D.C and left with a large crowd bidding them farewell. When the regiment reached Pittsburgh, the orders changed; the regiment would report to Kentucky. The 2nd Minnesota arrived at Louisville on October 22 and reported to General William Tecumseh Sherman, commanding the Department of the Cumberland.

=== Mill Springs ===
Come January 2, 1862, the 2nd Minnesota was assigned to the III brigade of George H. Thomas' I division, Army of the Ohio. Throughout January, the army moved to push the advancing Confederate Generals Felix Kirk Zollicoffer and George B Crittenden across the Cumberland River. On January 19, the two forces collided near Mill Springs, Kentucky.

The 2nd Minnesota took position in the rear, hearing the fight begin without them. Eventually, Thomas himself ordered reinforcements to the front, the 2nd included. The regiment advanced through the woods until coming into plain view of a line of Confederate infantry in front. The Minnesotans took position on a fence and the enemy was driven away, but the line they had fought was actually the Confederate's second line; the first being hidden underneath the smoke of gunfire and mist from the morning rain on the opposite side of the fence. This was later identified as the 20th Tennessee Infantry.

Close quarters fighting immediately broke out between the combatants. Col. McCook, commanding the III brigade described the combat:

The contest was at first almost hand to hand; the enemy and the Second Minnesota were poking their guns through the same fence.

The rebel infantry quickly fled except for one officer who fired his revolver, wounding Lieutenant Stout of Company I before being shot down; this man was later identified as Bailie Peyton. The 2nd then took part in a bayonet charge with the 9th Ohio against the wavering rebel lines. Company A, on picket duty until then, finally joined their regiment in the battle The Confederate army took to rout and was pursued to their camp; the Battle of Mill Springs would be the first major Union victory of the war, and the first combat of the 2nd Minnesota.

=== Perryville ===
On August 26, 1862, major changes were made to the structure of the regiment: Van Cleve had been promoted to brigade command on March 21, so Lt.-Col. James George was made the regiment's Colonel, Lt.-Col. Alexander Wilkins was reassigned Colonel of the 9th Minnesota. In turn, he was replaced by Judson Wade Bishop, who would go on to write much of the 2nd Minnesota's history. Capt. Davis of Company F was promptly made Major.

Come October 1, 1862, the Army of the Ohio prepared to recover parts of Kentucky and Tennessee taken by the Confederates in the Heartland Offensive. This effort culminated in the Battle of Perryville on October 8. Due to miscommunication between the senior army officers, the 2nd Minnesota took no active part in the main engagement. On the morning of the battle, Bishop lead a company of men to gather water to fill the regiment's canteens. As they approached a pool of water, they reported the distinct sounds of battle approaching. To their confusion, their corps was not fully committed. The men were followed by a friendly regiment later that night, and a close call was made. In the darkness, the two bodies of men could barely make out if each other were friends or enemies. Bishop described this encounter in the 2nd's narrative:

We had no experience in the whole war so startling as that cocking of muskets behind us, knowing as we did that they were in the hands of friends who were not informed of our presence in front of them.

=== Action of Battle's Farm ===
Eventually, the 2nd Minnesota found themselves coincidentally encamped on the property of Col. Battle, 20th Tennessee, who was now with his regiment in Confederate General Braxton Bragg's army.

On February 15, 1863, a detachment of 14 men from Company H led by Sgt. Homes went foraging. About 3–4 miles from camp, they were surrounded by 125 rebel cavalrymen. A skirmish ensued in which the Confederates advanced against the Minnesotans. Homes' men fired back, wounding several men. It wasn't long before the cavalry withdrew, and the men of Company H could return to camp. Several rebels were wounded; three of which were brought back to the Union camp; two of them died of wounds.

=== Tullahoma campaign ===
The 2nd Minnesota joined the command of Maj. Gen. William Rosecrans in the Tullahoma campaign. The main objective was to drive Bragg's army out of central Tennessee, then threaten the strategic city of Chattanooga.

The campaign was largely one of maneuvers in which the 2nd Minnesota was engaged in several skirmishes, most notably at Hoover's Gap. The Union troops forced Bragg's men to withdraw from the gap. The 2nd suffered no casualties. On July 3, 1863, the campaign ended in a resounding victory for Rosecrans as Bragg was completely outflanked. Around the same time that Vicksburg had surrendered and Gettysburg was won, Chattanooga opened to the Union army.

=== Chickamauga ===
Although Rosecrans' operations around Chattanooga were successful, he did not pursue and defeat Bragg's army in detail. After receiving reinforcements from Virginia, Bragg attacked Rosecrans at Chickamauga on September 18, 1863. The 2nd Minnesota would serve in the III brigade, III division, XIV Corps, Army of the Cumberland in the coming battle.

==== September 19 ====
Next morning on September 19, the Minnesotans enjoyed a 20-minute breakfast before being ordered off of the Lafayette-Chattanooga road to take part in the day's fighting. The regiment found itself on the left of the III brigade in between McDaniel's and Kelly's houses. The 2nd and its brigade were soon ordered to advance and defeat the Confederate forces before them; it did not take long for them to find the enemy in the wooded areas in front. Musketry could be heard coming from the regiment's right and front engaging with Baird's division. The 2nd moved southward to engage the enemy, and in no time firing commenced. The rebels attacked, were repulsed, rallied, and were repulsed once more by the III brigade. The 2nd used the brief lull to replenish its ammunition and carry the wounded to the rear.

Within a few minutes, bullets began passing by the 2nd Minnesota. The regiment was unable to return fire, as foliage obscured any view of the enemy. The soldiers held their fire until the enemy finally came within view. To their surprise, Union stragglers first came into view, pouring over the III brigade. Almost immediately as they finally passed by, Confederate forces could be distinctly seen charging the 2nd Minnesota. The regiment immediately fired a volley, halting the enemy's fast approach. A firefight continued for the next few minutes until the rebel infantry could no longer stand it, and they rapidly withdrew.

Afterward, the 9th Ohio of the same brigade returned from guarding an ammunition train, and attempted to recapture Gunther's Battery lost earlier in the day. The 2nd Minnesota helplessly watched as the 9th Ohio were obliged to withdraw in the face of yet another Confederate assault. Union skirmishers warned the brigade that the Confederates were attempting to take the left flank of the line. The 2nd Minnesota promptly faced eastward to meet the onslaught. The rebel infantry came on and were again repulsed by the 2nd alone. Another rebel force approached from the North, and the regiment once again turned to repulse the threat. A battery of artillery took position by the III brigade as the enemy was waited for.

Suddenly, several ranks of Confederate infantry silently appeared out of the wood. The 2nd commenced firing by files and halted the enemy, which began to fire sporadically. The federal cannons opened up with canister to support the infantry. At around 40-60 yards from the Union line, the rebel ranks broke in confusion. This was the final combat of the 2nd Minnesota for the 19th. However, the battle would continue the next day.

==== September 20 ====
Next morning, the III brigade, III division was formed west of the Lafayette Road, in reserve, near Kelly's house. At 9:00 am firing opened along the front and soon bullets could be heard whistling by the reserve and 2nd Minnesota. Stragglers from the first line ran by and the regiment tried to stop many of them. It seemed like the action of the previous day was to repeat. The 2nd soon received orders to move to the left of the line, facing east and parallel to the Lafayette Road. This was done quickly with the 2nd taking position on the right of the first line of the III brigade with a battery on its right flank.

Suddenly, shots rang out in front of the first line as Confederates appeared from the smoke. The III brigade changed front and lost many men doing so; only two of the officer's horses in the entire brigade survived the ordeal. Despite the danger, the III brigade continued charging against the rebel forces and drove them into the woods; the first line fired into the withdrawing Confederates. Once the enemy retired, the regiment and the brigade were ordered to the left in order to help repulse an attack from Confederate General John C. Breckenridge. Confederate forces reoccupied the area once the regiment left, taking most of the wounded men and 12 men assisting them prisoner.

The regiment was directed to move to Horseshoe Ridge near the Snodgrass house. The Union right flank had collapsed and the last phase of the battle began. Along the way, Maj. Gen. Thomas rode by the regiments he had led at Mill Springs, including the 2nd Minnesota and said he was glad to see them in "good order". Upon arriving, the 2nd Minnesota relieved the 21st Ohio and took view of the Confederate columns approaching. For a while, several attacks were made and repulsed. The 2nd Minnesota, as well as most of the regiments defending Horseshoe Ridge, were running out of ammunition. Fortunately, Steedman's brigade soon arrived with reinforcements and ammunition. Fighting on Horseshoe Ridge continued until dark. During the night, the regiment and the rest of their allied forces retired to Rossville.

Although a victory for Bragg, the Battle of Chickamauga had been costlier for the Confederates than the Union, and Union control of the route to Chattanooga was saved by the conduct of George Thomas' command and the 2nd Minnesota. Out of 384 men present for duty at Chickamauga, 35 were killed, 113 were wounded, 14 were made prisoner. The conduct of the regiment was praised by Col. Van Deerver, III brigade commanding:

It is a noticeable fact that the Second Minnesota Regiment had not a single man missing.

=== Missionary Ridge ===
After the battle of Chickamauga, the 2nd Minnesota went with the Union army back to Chattanooga where Bragg intended to besiege the defenders by utilizing key terrain around the city. George Thomas took command of the Army of the Cumberland, second to Maj. Gen. Ulysses S. Grant who now commanded the Union armies of the west. The 2nd Minnesota had been reassigned to the II brigade, III division of the XIV Corps now commanded by John M. Palmer. From late September to late November, another battle was expected. Throughout those months the 2nd aided in the construction and defense of the fortifications around Chattanooga.

==== November 23 ====
By November 23, 1863, all preparations to begin the advance against Bragg were complete. The divisions of the Army all moved east and captured the Confederate fortifications at Orchard Knob.

==== November 25 ====
On the 24th, Hooker's army attacked Lookout Mountain and successfully drove the Confederates in defeat. The next area to be attacked was the northern end of Missionary Ridge, which was later reinforced by some of the rebel units defeated on the 24th. The next day, the III division was to attack with the II brigade assigned to the center, 2nd Minnesota leading in front. The regiment had two companies deployed ahead as skirmishers with six behind. Companies E and G were on detached service.

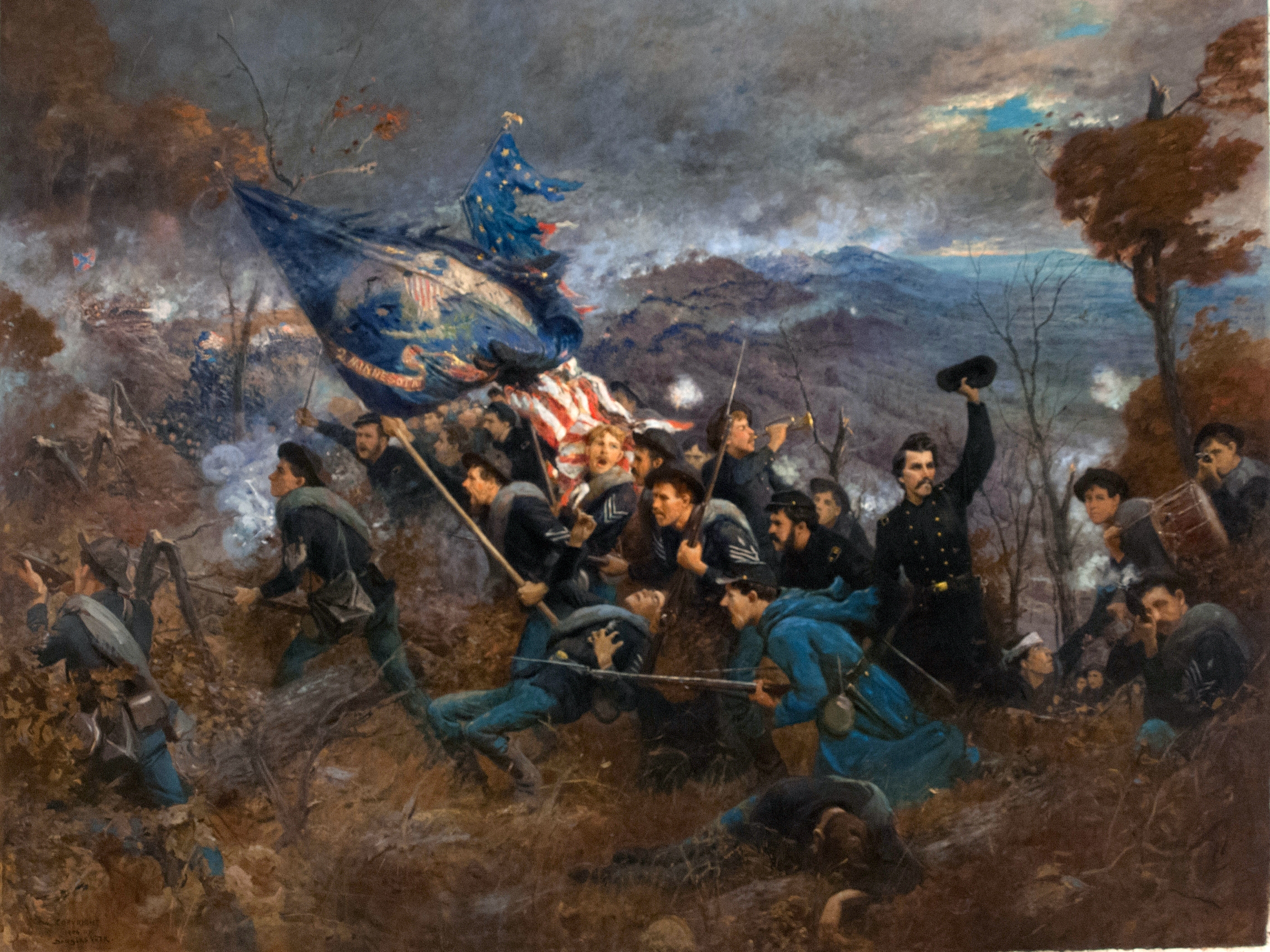
The Second Minnesota Infantry Regiment charging up Missionary Ridge by Douglas Volk, 1906.

At 3:00 pm the regiment advanced to the foot of Missionary Ridge. The regiment appeared from the edge of the woods that concealed them and could fully view the enemy defenses atop the ridge and at its foot. As the 2nd Minnesota came within range, the Confederate artillery and infantry opened fire, inflicting many losses. At around 100 paces, the Minnesotans hurried themselves onto the enemy defenses, which were quickly abandoned in the face of the advance. The rebel infantry retired to their second line of breastworks as the 2nd Minnesota took possession of the first line. Firing commenced and continued for 20 minutes until the rest of the supporting regiments began a general advance.

The 2nd Minnesota then surged up the ridge through entanglements and difficult terrain all while under fire. Soon, the III brigade became intermingled, but crowned the top of the Confederate breastworks. The ferocity of the charge triggered a rout of the rebel forces, who left their artillery pieces in place. Two of the six 12-pounder Napoleons captured by the brigade were conquered by the Minnesotans. No sooner were the enemy guns captured when a counterattack by Confederate reserves was made. The 2nd Minnesota and the III brigade made another charge, this time driving the Confederates from the ridge completely. The Union army had revenge for the Battle of Chickamauga, and Chattanooga would remain firmly in northern hands. The 2nd Minnesota had 185 men and officers present for duty of which five were killed and 34 wounded; despite the uphill advance against entrenched infantry and artillery.

=== Veteranization ===
By November 30, 1863, companies F and G reunited with the others in the regiment. A few weeks later around 10 December, an announcement was received from the War Department stating that regiments who had served for a period of two years or longer were welcome to re-enlist for three more. On Christmas day, 300 men of the 2nd Minnesota had re-enlisted, 80% of the soldiers remaining in the regiment. The War Department promised a 30-day furlough to all re-enlisting men, and the 300 veterans embarked on 8 January 1864, for Minnesota; the 75 non-veterans remained behind in a temporary company. From 3–6 March 1864, the veterans began their return to the front; the regiment returning late due to delays in reaching Minnesota. On the 10th, the veterans returned to their same formations at Ringgold Gap, Georgia.

== Casualties ==
The regiment lost a total of 281 men during service; 2 officers and 91 enlisted men killed or mortally wounded, 2 officers and 186 enlisted men died of disease.

== Commanders ==
- Colonel Horatio P. Van Cleve - July 23, 1861, to March 21, 1862
- Colonel James George - May 15, 1862, to June 29, 1864
- Colonel Judson Wade Bishop - March 5 to July 11, 1865

== Continued lineage ==
The 2nd Battalion, 136th Infantry Regiment, 34th Infantry Division of the Minnesota Army National Guard traces its roots back to the 2nd Minnesota Infantry Regiment. The 136th retains its campaign streamers from the Civil War.

== See also ==
- List of Minnesota Civil War Units
- Minnesota in the American Civil War
