= Eldridge Turn-Halle =

- Formerly listed on the U.S. National Register of Historic Places
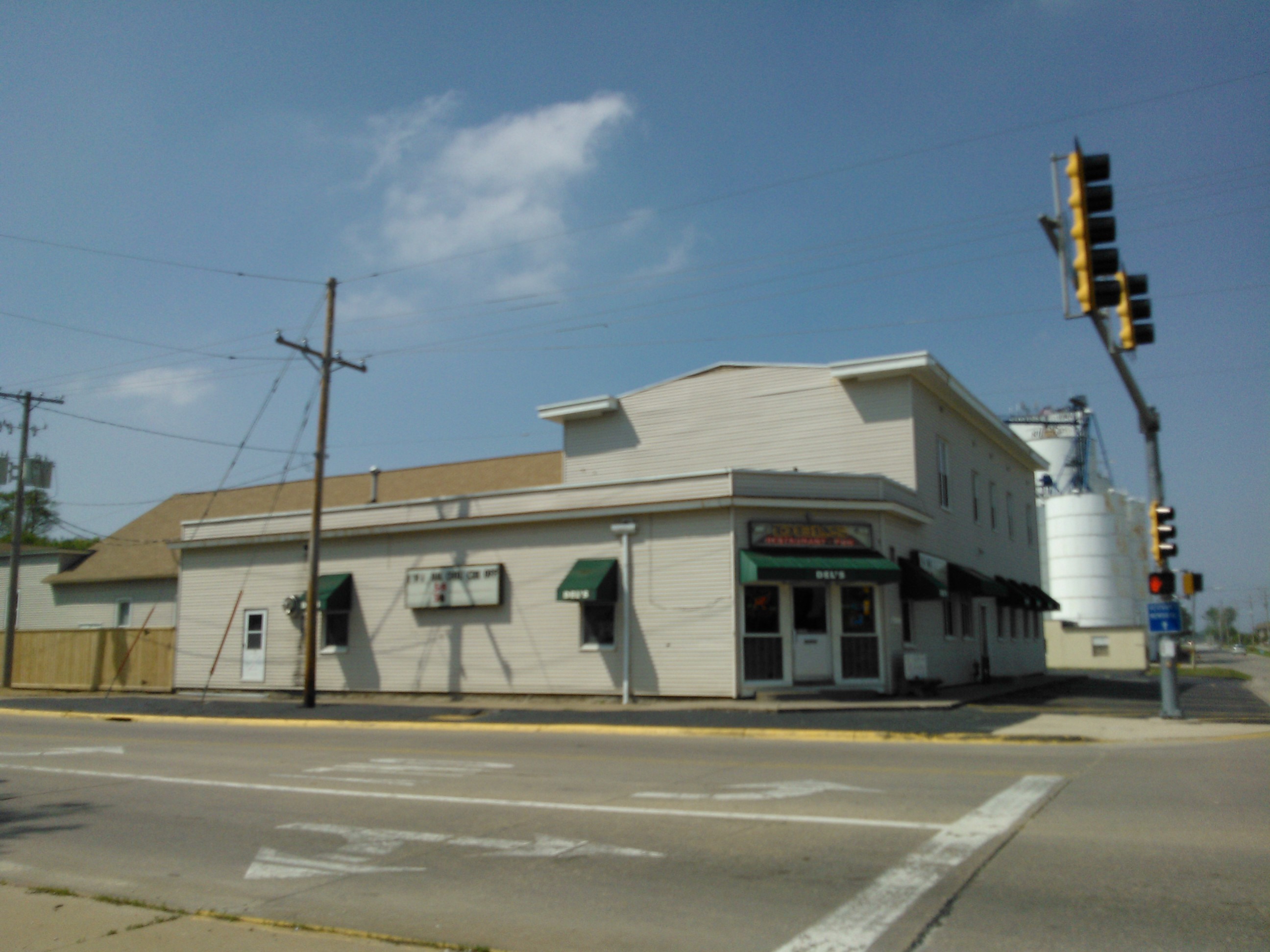

- Location within Iowa Location within the United States
- Location: 102 W. LeClaire St. Eldridge, Iowa
- Coordinates: 41°39′18″N 90°34′59″W
- Built: c. 1885
- NRHP reference No.: 87000032

Significant dates
- Added to NRHP: February 5, 1987
- Removed from NRHP: March 7, 2019

The Eldridge Turn-Halle, also known as Tomberg's Turner Hall, was a historic building located in Eldridge, Iowa, United States. It was listed on the National Register of Historic Places in 1987. The building was destroyed in a fire in 2013 and it was delisted from the National Register in 2019.

== Turnvereins ==
Friedrich Ludwig Jahn (1778–1852) was a teacher in Berlin who started outdoor physical education classes in 1811. His twin goals were to promote physical fitness and German nationalism. Over the next three decades gymnastic societies known as Turnvereins were begun in many German cities. Their members were known as “Turners”, the German word for gymnasts. The societies also served as gathering places for people who desired democratic reforms in the governments of the various German states. They supported the revolution that began in 1848 and when it failed they fled to the United States. Many Germans came to Scott County at that time and the county became the home to five Turnvereins, or Turner halls.

== Eldridge Turners ==
Emigration from the German states of Schleswig and Holstein to Scott County began as early as 1836 and continued through the 1880s. It first peaked after the failure of First Schleswig War in the early 1850s to liberate these states from the domination of Denmark. The German free-thinkers who wanted to protect their civil rights, and later those motivated by economic factors, made up a quarter of the county's population by the 1880s. Sheridan Township was initially dominated by Scotch-Irish emigres, but by 1860s the German's started to appear. Because of the high concentration of German immigrants in the county, many cultural organizations began to form, especially in Davenport. They also began to dominate in both business and politics. The first Turner Bund (Turnverein) in the county was established in Davenport by 1852.

Eldridge was platted in 1871 as a railroad town along the Davenport and St. Paul Railroad. Thirty percent of the households in town were German-born by 1880 and by 1900 they had risen to 49%. Another 25% had parents who had been born in Germany, which brought the total number of ethnic German's to 74%. The number of German business owners topped out at 83%.

This structure was built around 1885 and was used by the Eldridge Turnverein, which was established in 1893. It remained an influential organization in the community into the 1930s. Leo and Marie Tombergs owned the building for 53 years. During that time it was used for a reception and social hall. The Tombergs sold the property to the DelVichio family in 1996 and they operated a restaurant and pub in the building until it was destroyed in a fire on January 17, 2013. The remains of the building were torn down in April of the same year.

== See also ==
The following are clubhouses in Scott County, Iowa that are also listed on the National Register of Historic Places:

- Northwest Davenport Turner Society Hall
- Outing Club
- Wupperman Block/I.O.O.F. Hall
