= Turner Hall (Postville, Iowa) =

- U.S. National Register of Historic Places
- Turner Hall in 2021

- Location within Iowa Location within the United States
- Location: 119 East Greene Street; Postville, Iowa
- Coordinates: 43°05′13″N 91°34′04″W
- Area: less than one acre
- Built: 1914
- Architectural style: Late 19th and 20th Century Revivals
- NRHP reference No.: 00000921
- Added to NRHP: December 11, 2000

Turner Hall is a historic building located in Postville, Iowa, United States. A Turn Verein was a German social and athletic organization. Because Allamakee County in general, and Postville in particular, had a significant German immigrant population a Turn Verein was organized here. Their first building was a frame structure on Green Street, but when it proved insufficient they built this two-story brick structure in 1914. While the local German population used the facility for their gymnastics and other social customs, it also was used by the community at large as a community center. Three weeks after it opened the community filled the hall to capacity to hear Postville native John Mott, national leader of the YMCA, speak. He would win the Nobel Peace Prize in 1946. From 1940 to 1990 the building housed the Postville city hall. Even during these years, and after, it was a meeting place for various community organizations. The building was listed on the National Register of Historic Places in 2000.
