= Turners =

German-American gymnastic club members

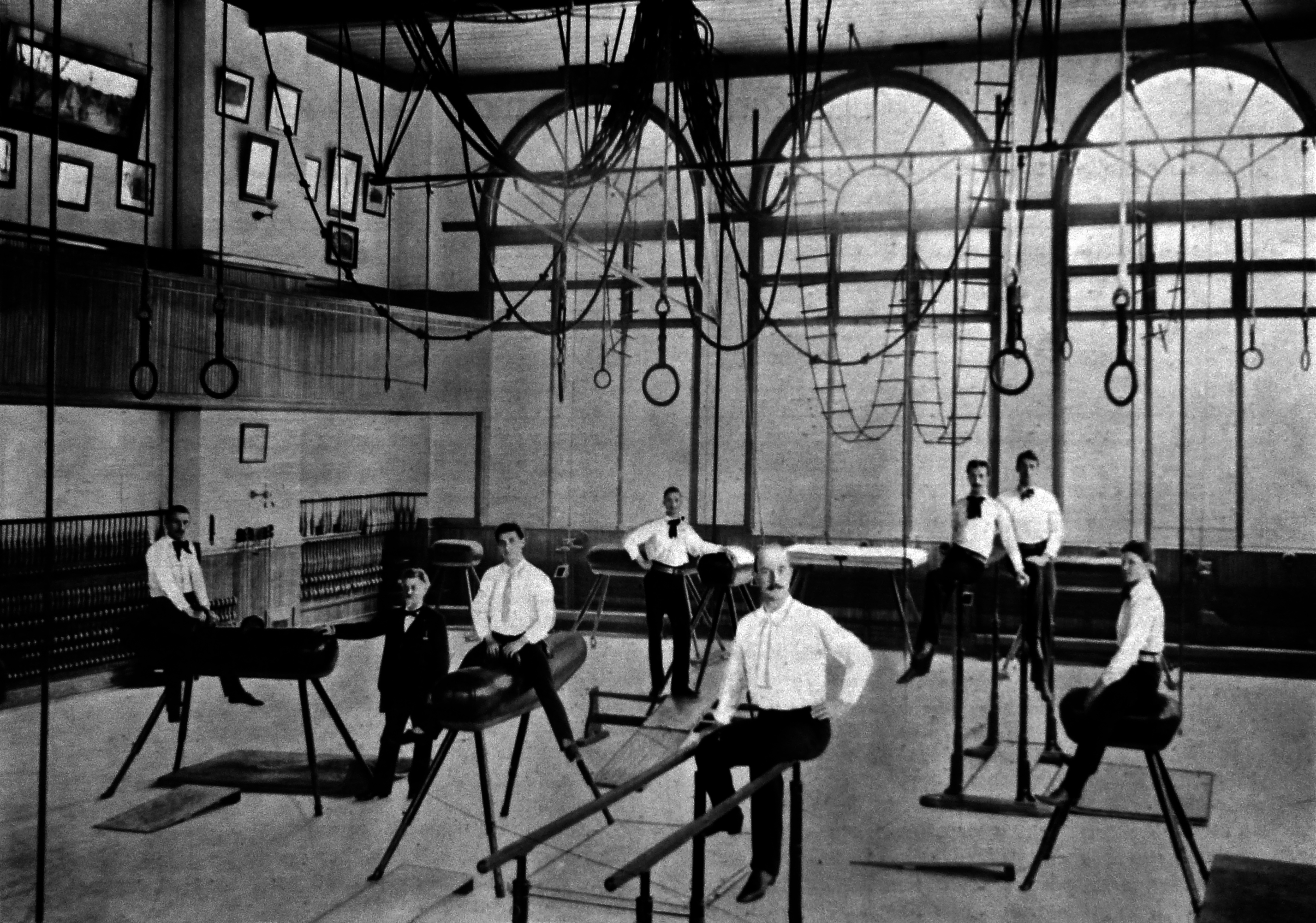
Gymnastics room in Turner Hall, Milwaukee, c. 1900

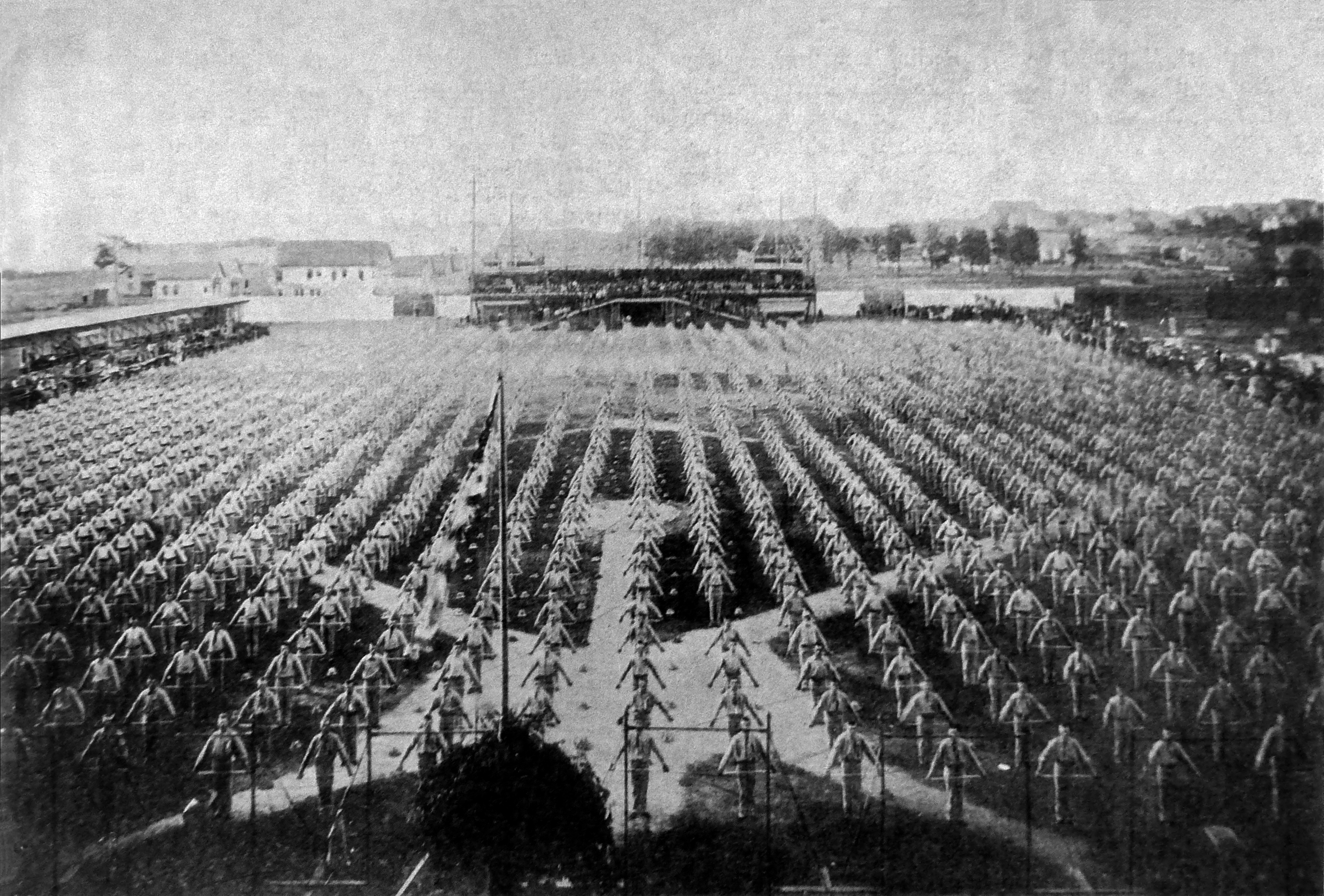
3,000 Turners performed at the Federal Gymnastics Festival in Milwaukee, 1893.

Turners (German: Turner, German: [ˈtʊʁnɐ]) are members of German-American gymnastic clubs called Turnvereine. They promoted German culture, physical culture, and liberal politics. Turners, especially Francis Lieber, were the leading sponsors of gymnastics as an American sport and the field of academic study.

In Germany, a major gymnastic movement was started by Turnvater ("father of gymnastics") and nationalist Friedrich Ludwig Jahn in the early 19th century when Germany was occupied by Napoleon. The Turnvereine (German: [ˈtʊʁnfɛɐ̯ˌʔaɪ̯nə]; "gymnastic unions"; from German turnen meaning "to practice gymnastics" and Verein meaning "club, union") were not only athletic but also political, reflecting their origin in similar ethnocentric "national gymnastic" organizations in Europe (such as the Czech Sokol), who participated in various national movements for independence. The Turner movement in Germany was generally liberal in nature, and many Turners took part in the Revolutions of 1848.

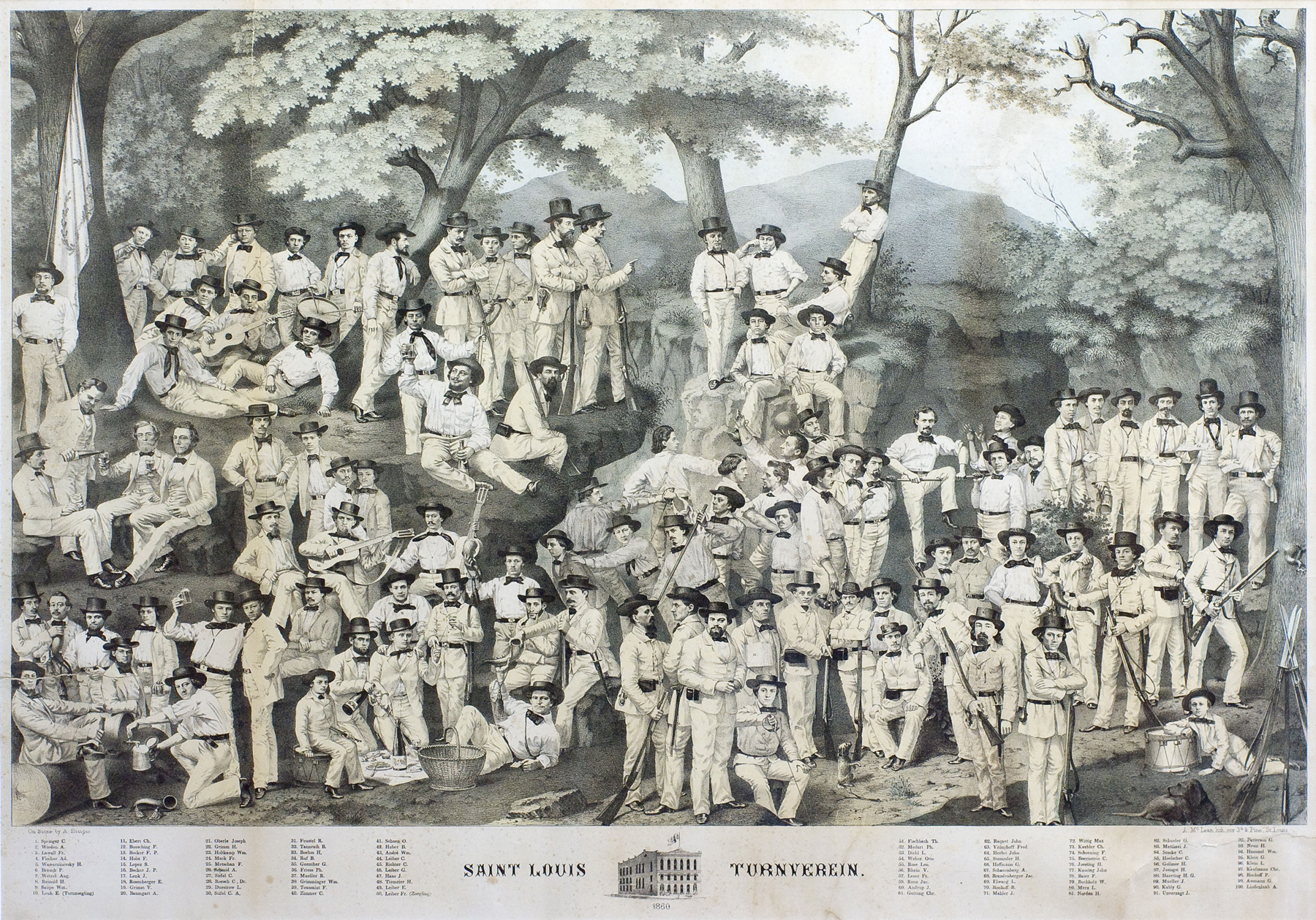
Group portrait of the St. Louis, Missouri Turnverein in 1860

After the failure of the 1848 Revolution in Germany, the Turner movement was suppressed, and many Turners left Germany, some for the United States, especially the Ohio Valley region, Wisconsin, Missouri, and Texas. Several of these Forty-Eighters became Union soldiers and some became Republican politicians. Besides serving as physical education, social, political, and cultural organizations for German immigrants, Turners were also active in public education and labor movements. They were leading promoters of gymnastics in the U.S. as a sport and a school subject. In the U.S., the movement declined after 1900, and especially after 1917.

== History in the United States ==
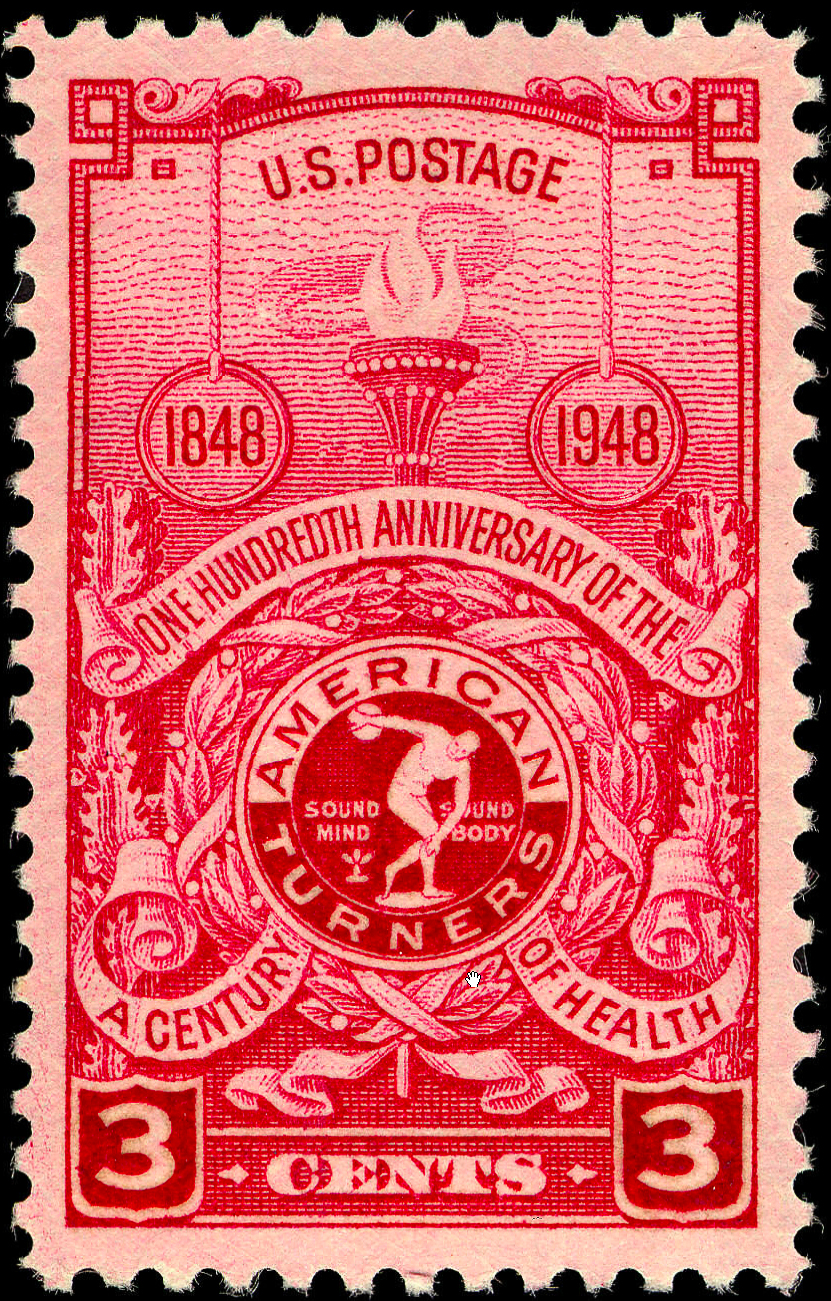
Postage stamp commemorating the hundredth anniversary of the American Turners

The Turner movement was preceded by the first wave of gymnastics in the U.S. in the 1820s, led by Germans such as Charles Beck and Charles Follen and Americans such as John Neal. Beck opened the first gymnasium in the U.S. in 1825 at the Round Hill School in Northampton, Massachusetts. Follen opened the first college gymnasium and the first public gymnasium in the States in 1826 at Harvard College and in Boston, Massachusetts, respectively. Neal was the first American to open a public gymnasium in the U.S., in Portland, Maine, in 1827. He documented and promoted these early efforts in the American Journal of Education and The Yankee, helping to establish the American branch of the movement.

The Turnvereine contributed to German-Americans' integration into their new home. They still exist in areas of heavy German immigration, such as Iowa, Texas, Wisconsin, Indiana, Ohio, Minnesota, Missouri, Syracuse, New York, Kentucky, New York City, Sacramento, and Los Angeles.

About 1,000 Turners served as Union soldiers during the Civil War. Anti-slavery was a common element, as typified by Carl Schurz. Many Republican leaders in German communities were members. They provided the bodyguard at Abraham Lincoln's inauguration on March 4, 1861, and at his funeral in April 1865. In the Camp Jackson Affair, a large force of German volunteers helped prevent Confederate forces from seizing the government arsenal in St. Louis just before the war began. After the war, the national organization took a new name, Nordamerikanischer Turnerbund, and supported German-language teaching in public high schools, as well as gymnastics. Women's auxiliaries formed in the 1850s and 1860s. The high point in membership came in 1894, with 317 societies and about 40,000 adult male members, along with 25,000 children and 3,000 women.

In the 1904 Olympics, several competitors represented Turners organizations in Missouri, Illinois, Pennsylvania, New Jersey, and New York, and some Olympic teams were sponsored by Turners.

Like other German-American groups, the Turners experienced suspicion during World War I, even though they no longer had much contact with Germany. German-language instruction ended at many schools and universities, and the federal government imposed restrictions on German-language publications. The younger generation generally demanded the switch to exclusive use of English society affairs, which allowed many Turner societies to continue to function.

Cultural assimilation and both World Wars with Germany took a gradual toll on membership, with some halls closing and others becoming regular dance halls, bars, or bowling alleys. As of 2011, 54 Turner societies remained in the U.S. The American Turners' headquarters is in Louisville, Kentucky.

In 1948, the US Post Office issued a 3-cent commemorative stamp to mark the 100th anniversary of the movement in the country.

The Turnverein in Sacramento, founded in 1854, claims to be the oldest institution in the city still in existence. The Turnverein Vorwaerts of Fort Wayne, Indiana, owned the Hugh McCulloch House from 1906 to 1966. It was listed on the National Register of Historic Places in 1980.

== Gallery ==
=== Vintage photos of the Milwaukee Turnverein ===
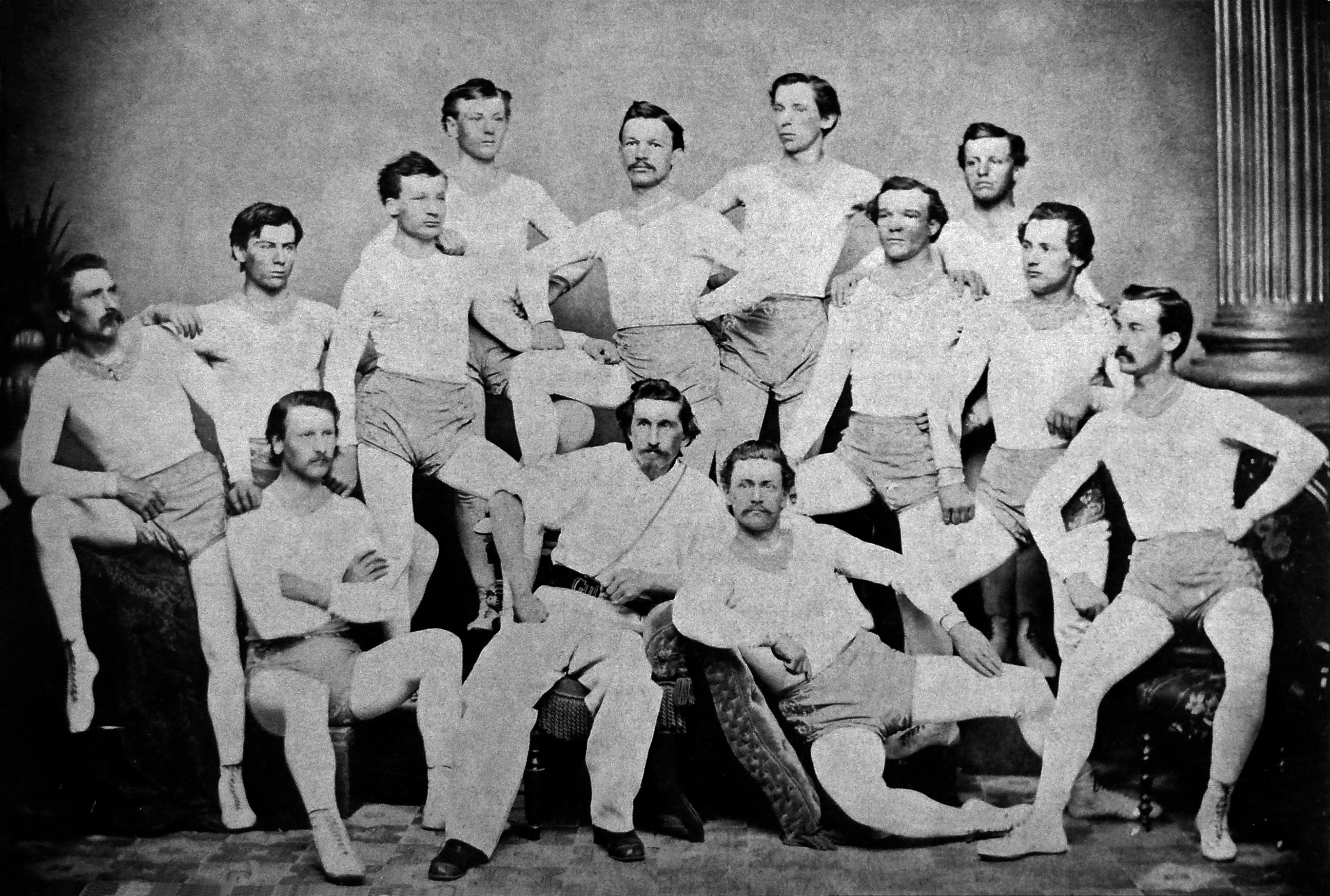
1866

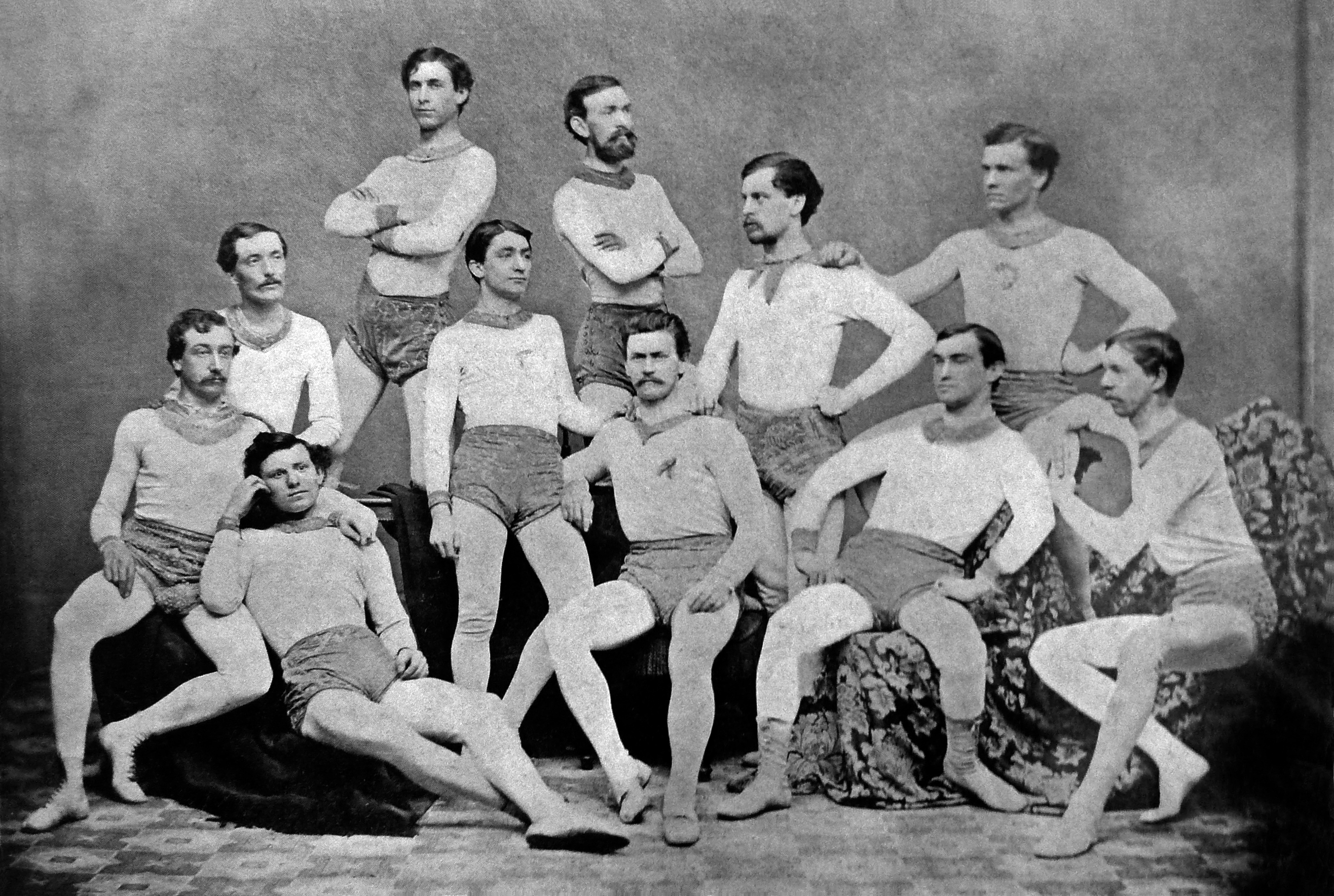
1869

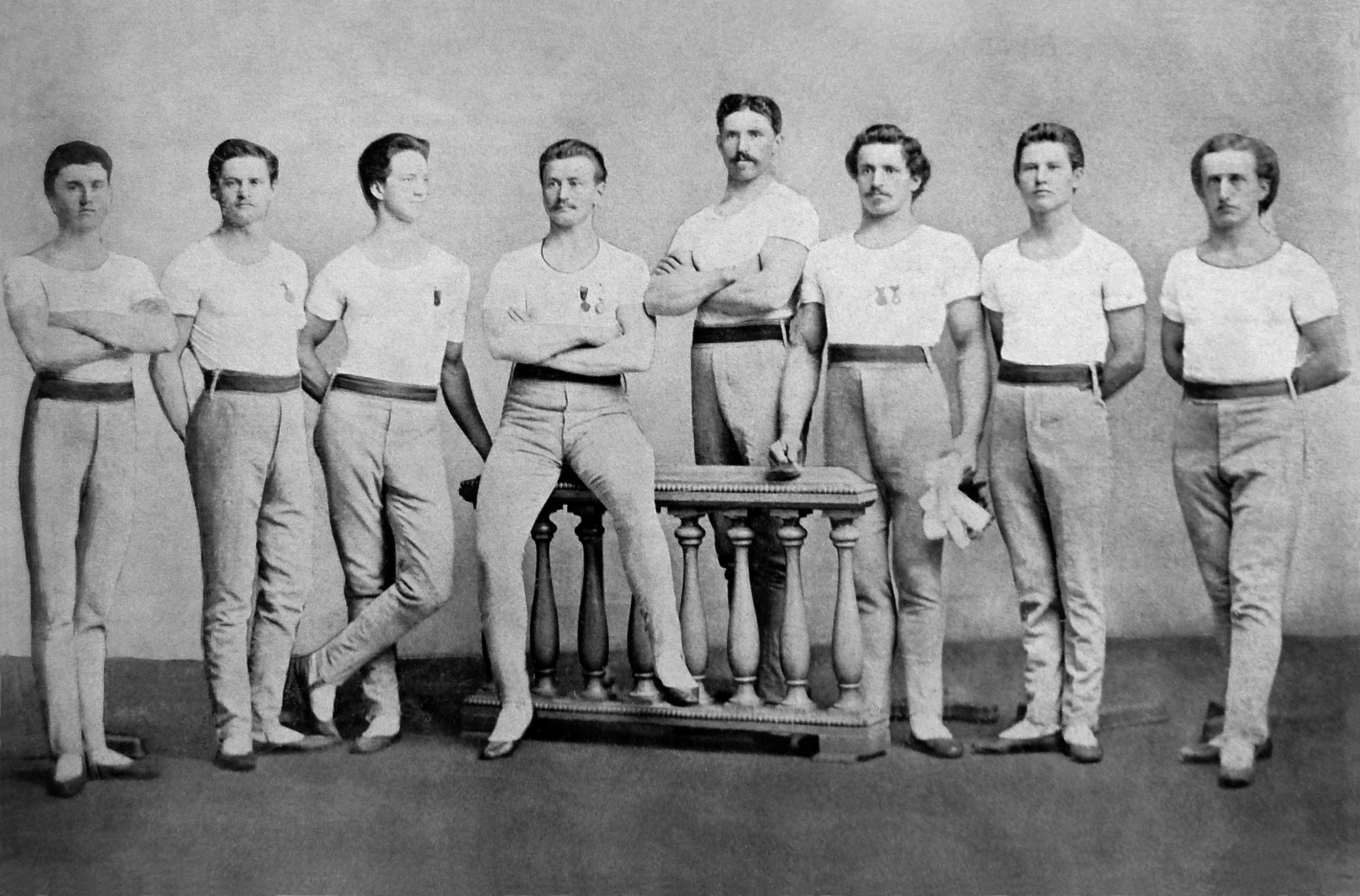
1875

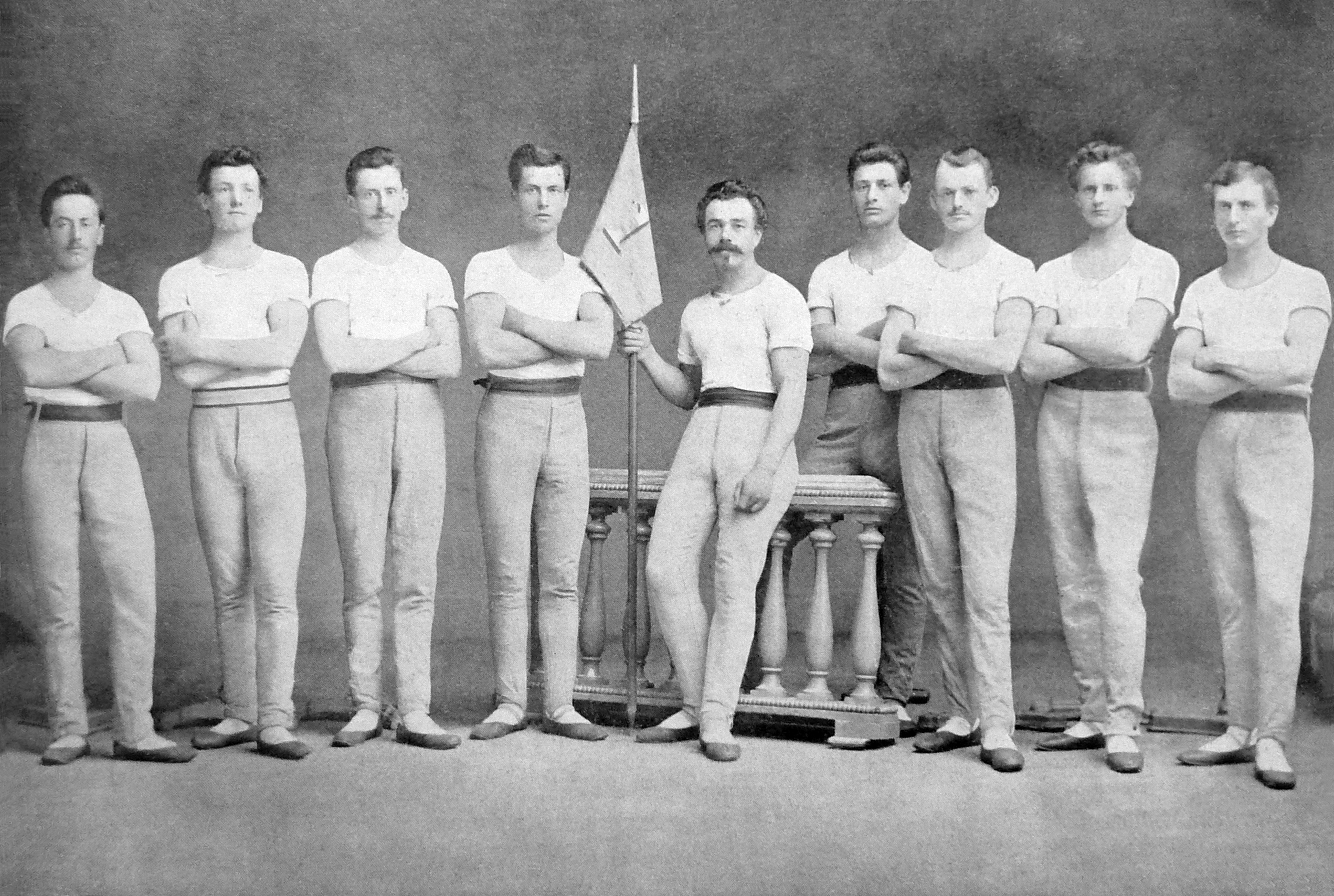
1879

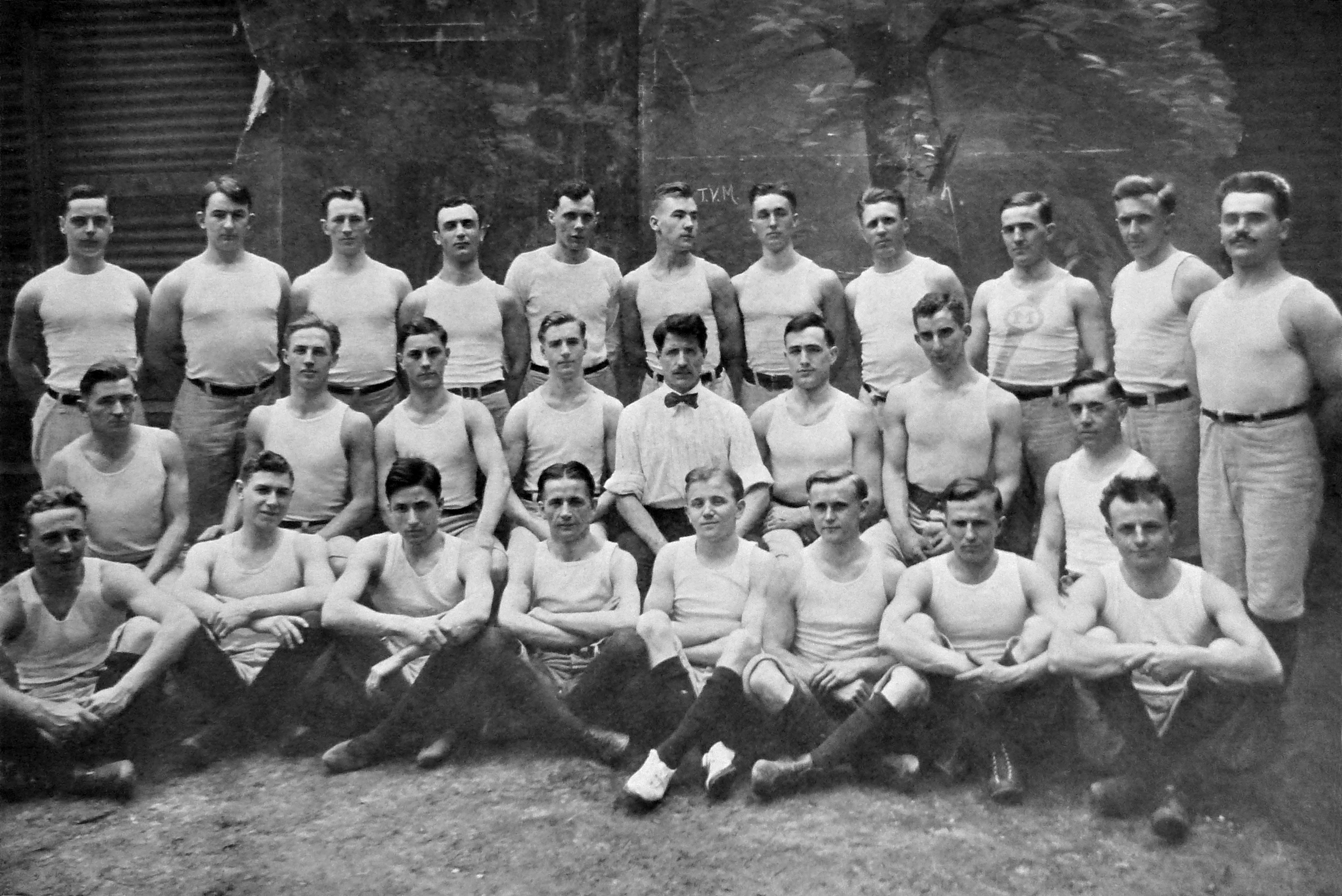
1915

=== Other Wisconsin Turners in 1915 ===
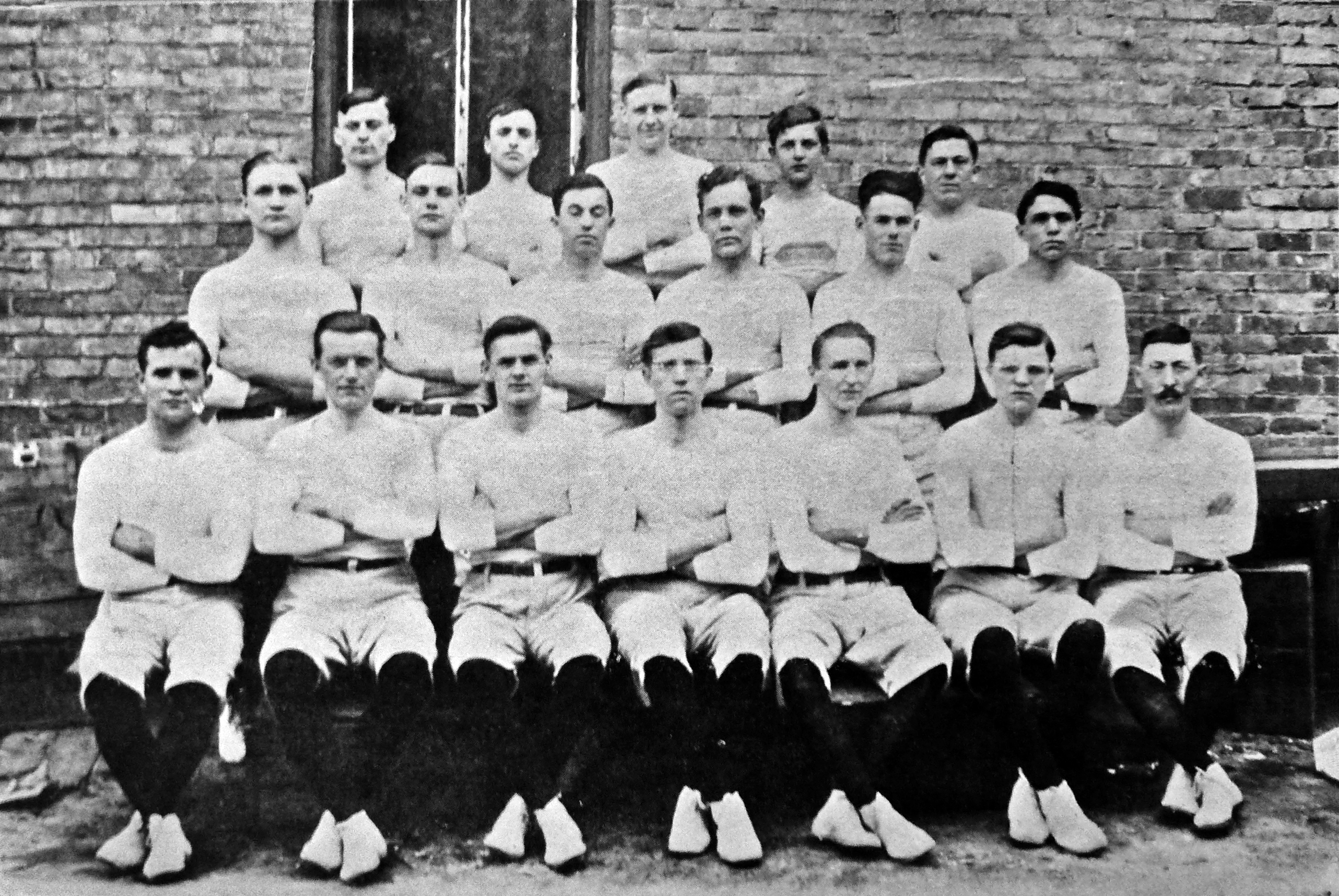
Kenosha

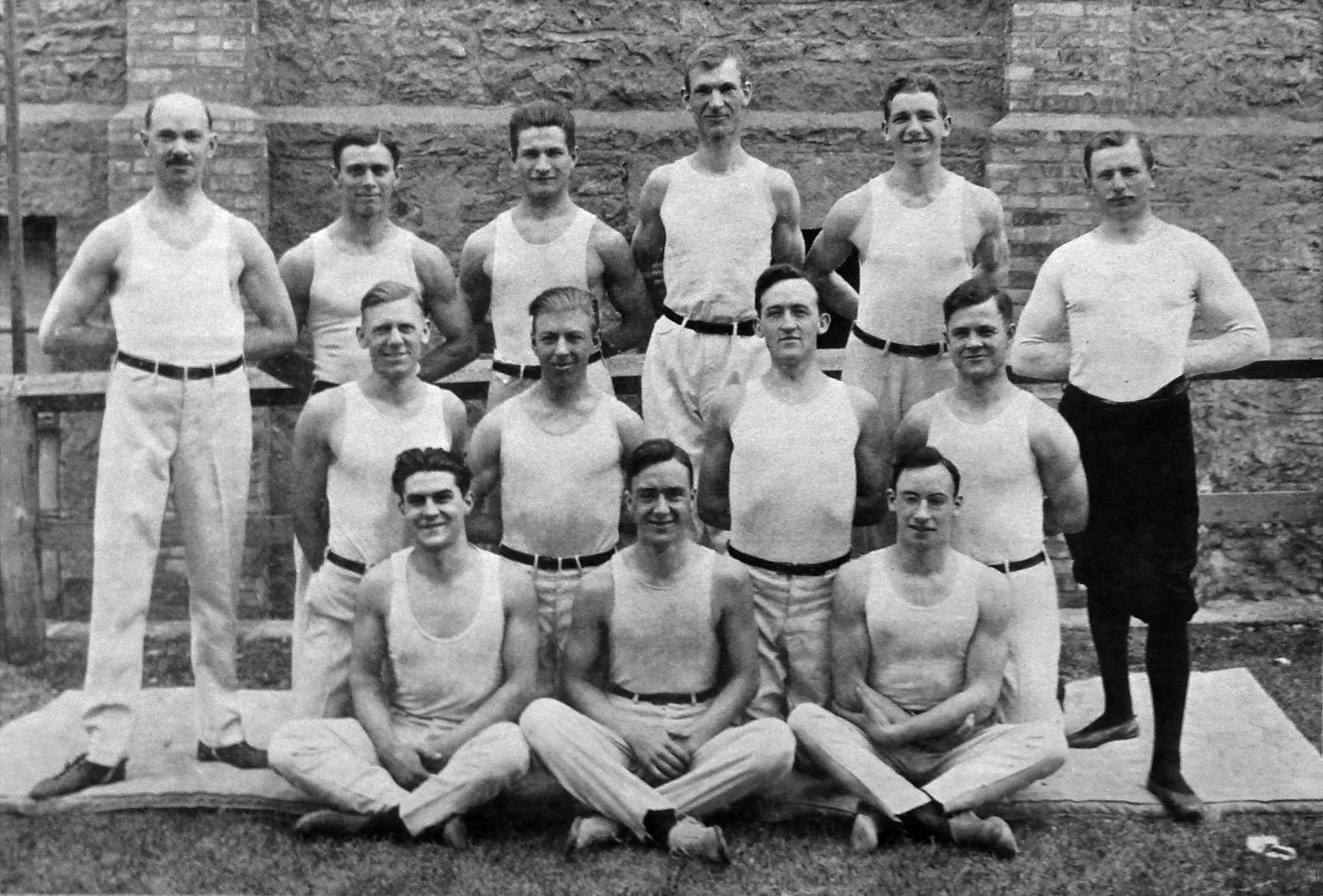
Madison

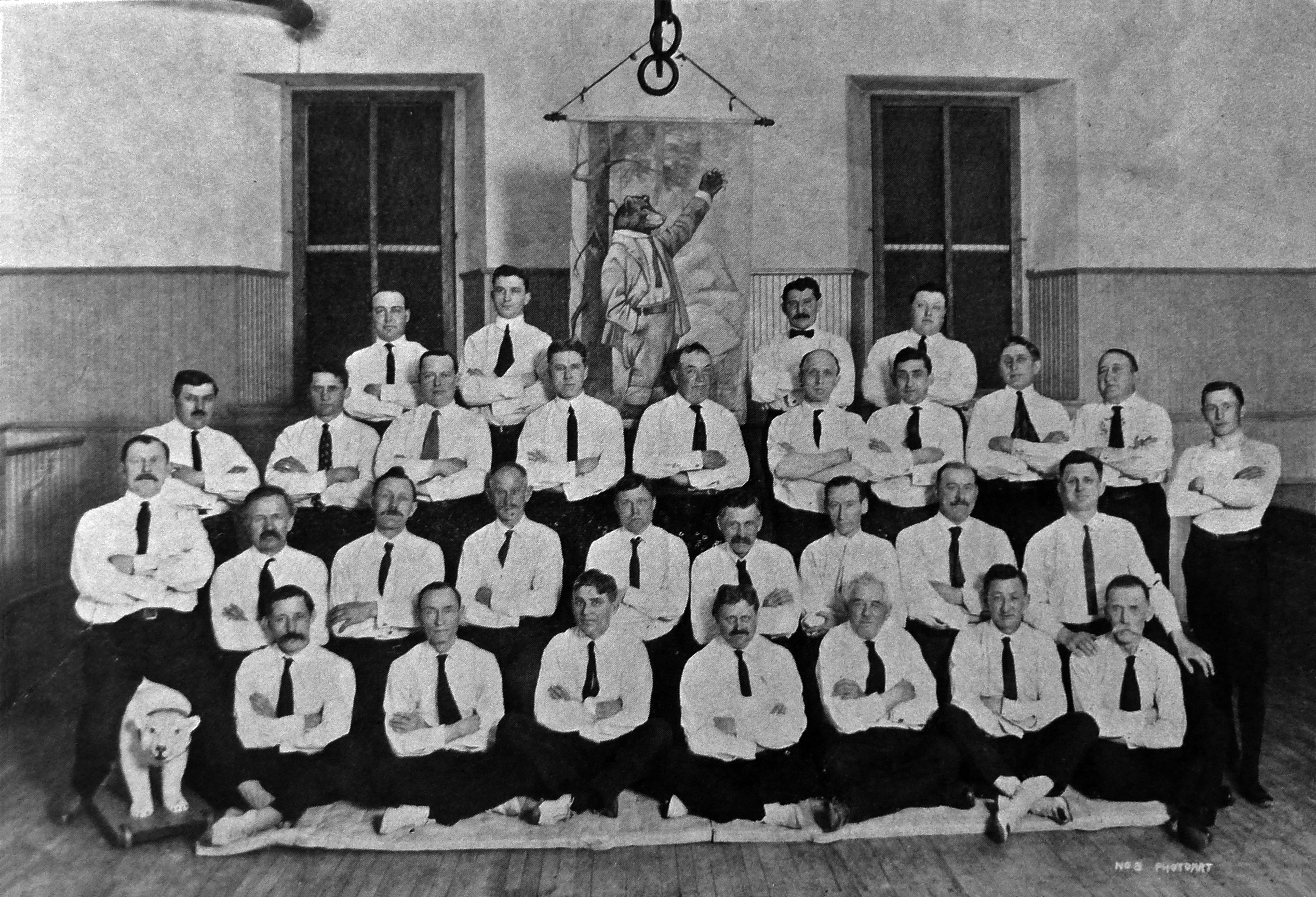
Madison Bears (seniors)

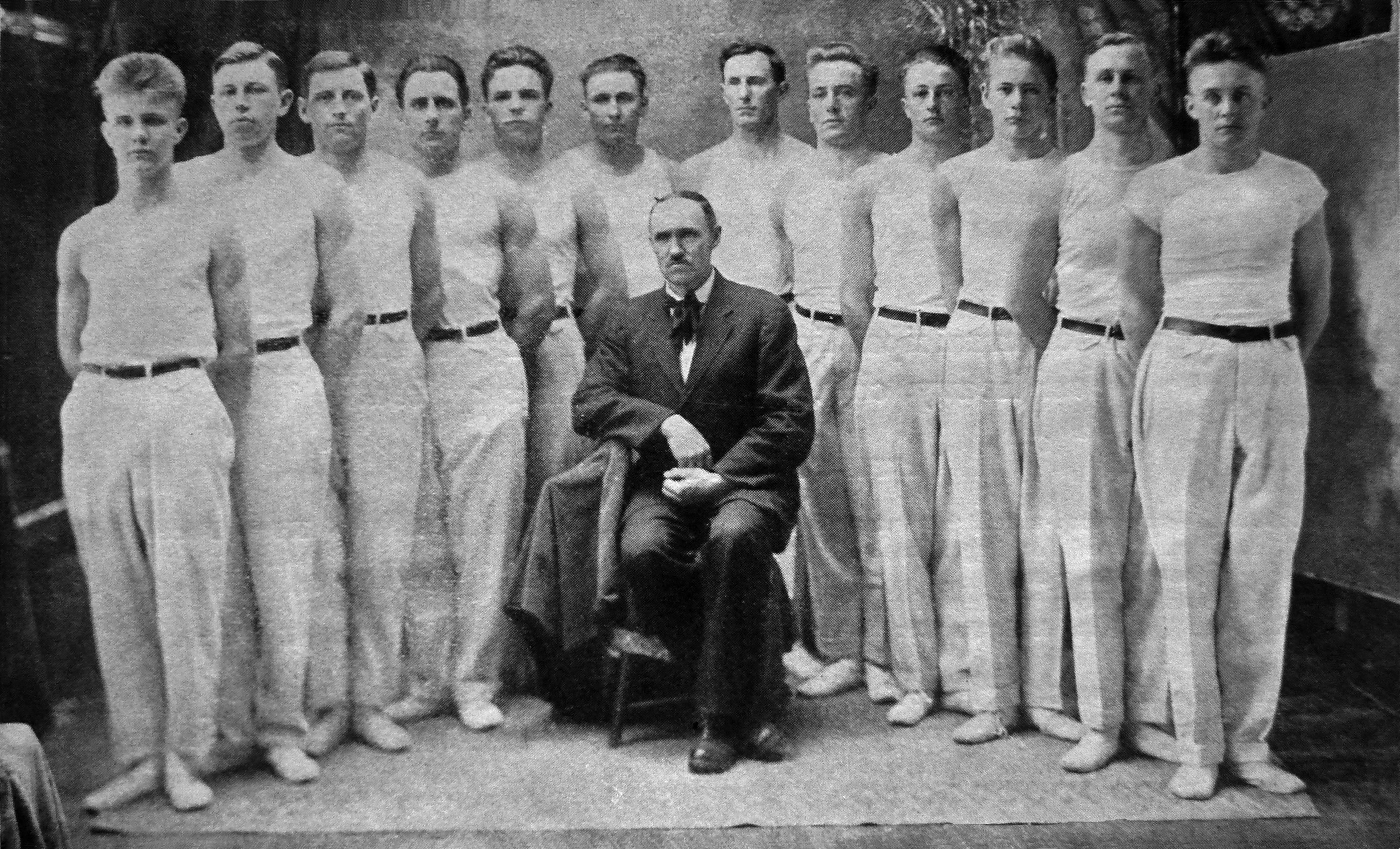
New Holstein

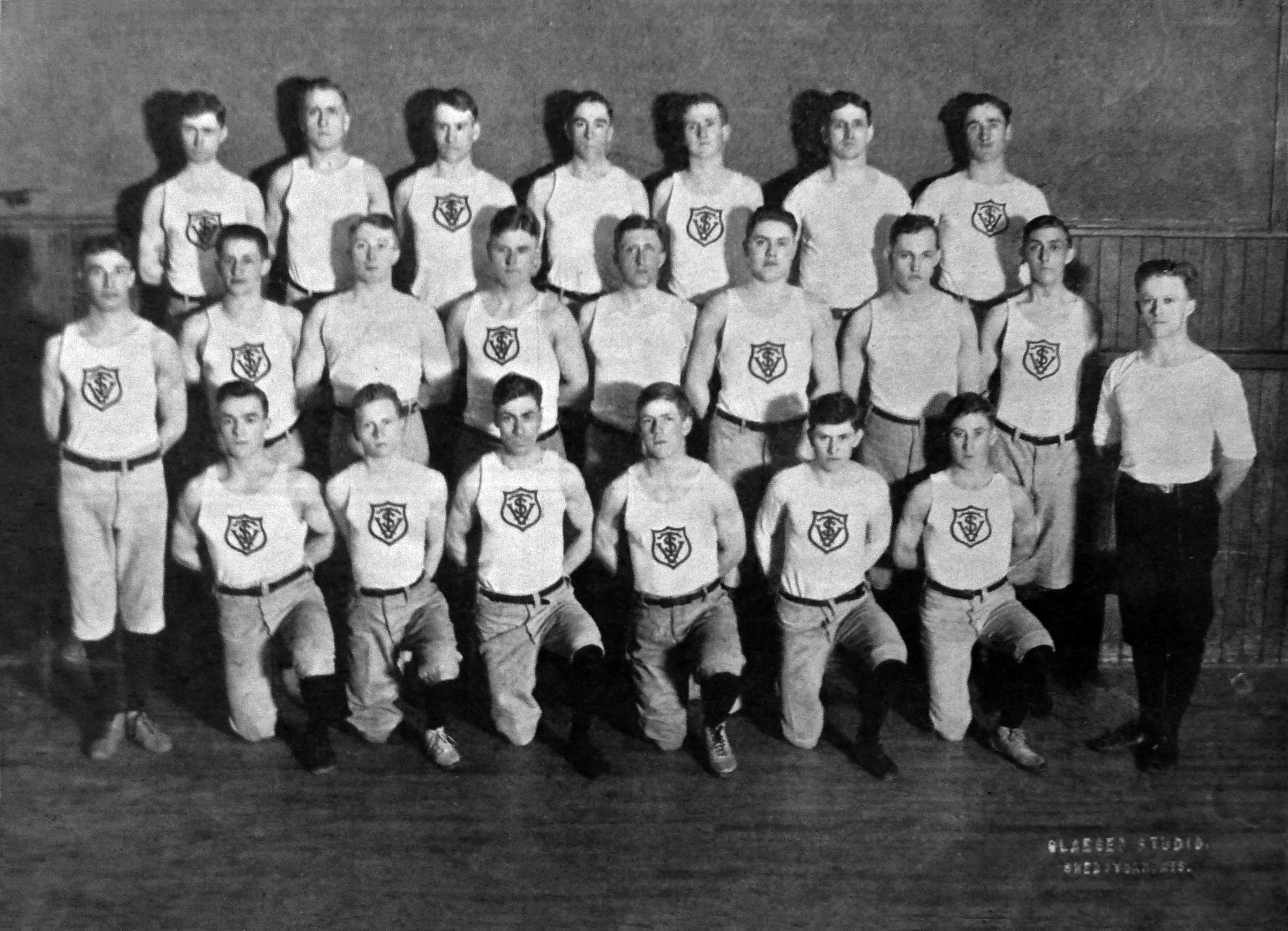
Sheboygan

=== Monuments in the United States ===
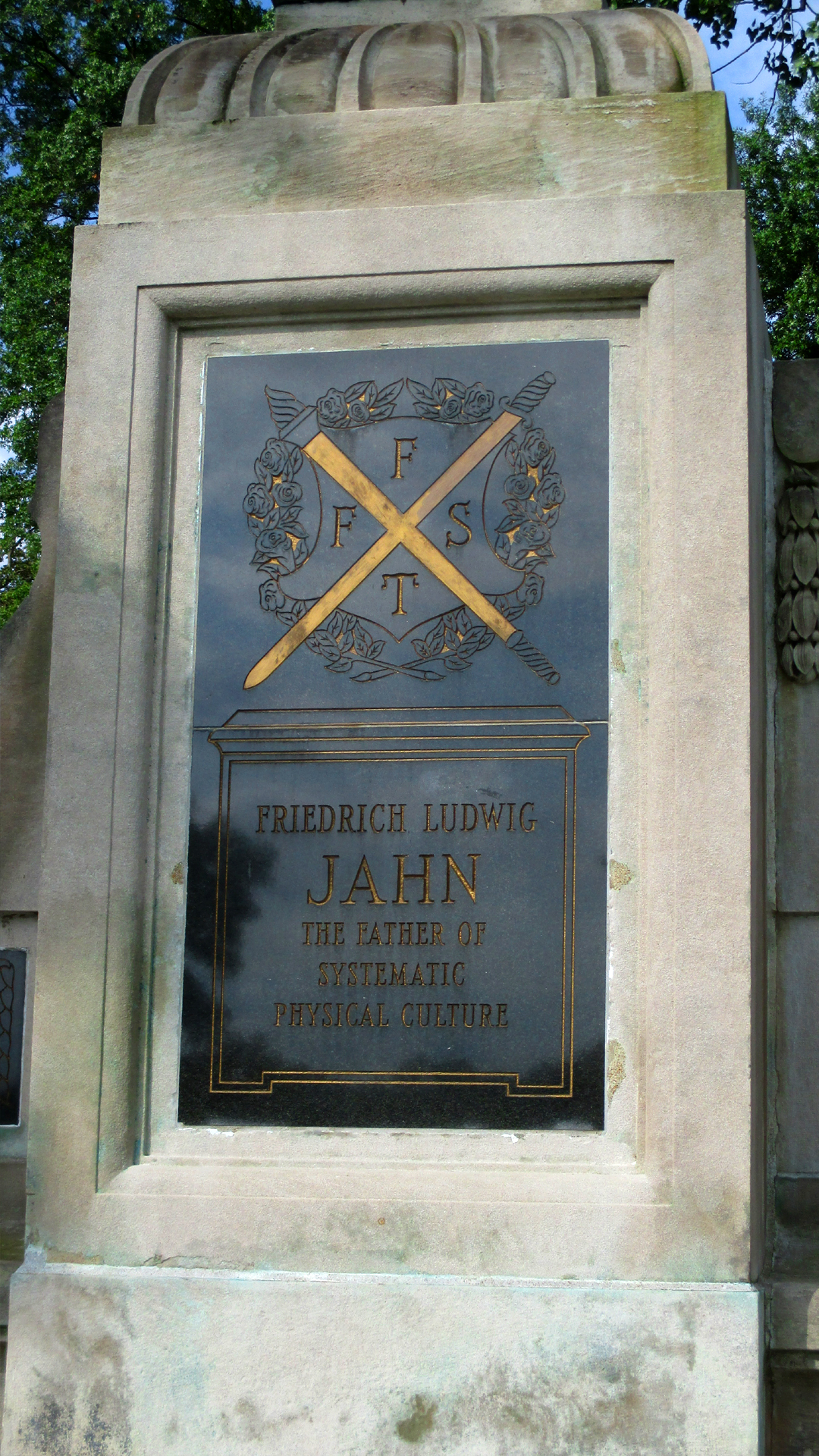
Jahn Monument in St. Louis, Missouri

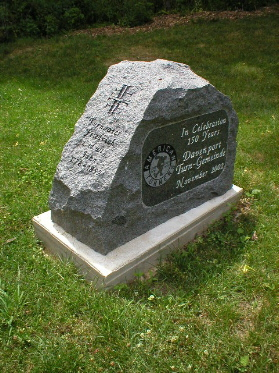
Davenport, Iowa Turngemeinde Monument

=== Jahn Monument in Berlin with memorial plaques from American Turnvereine ===
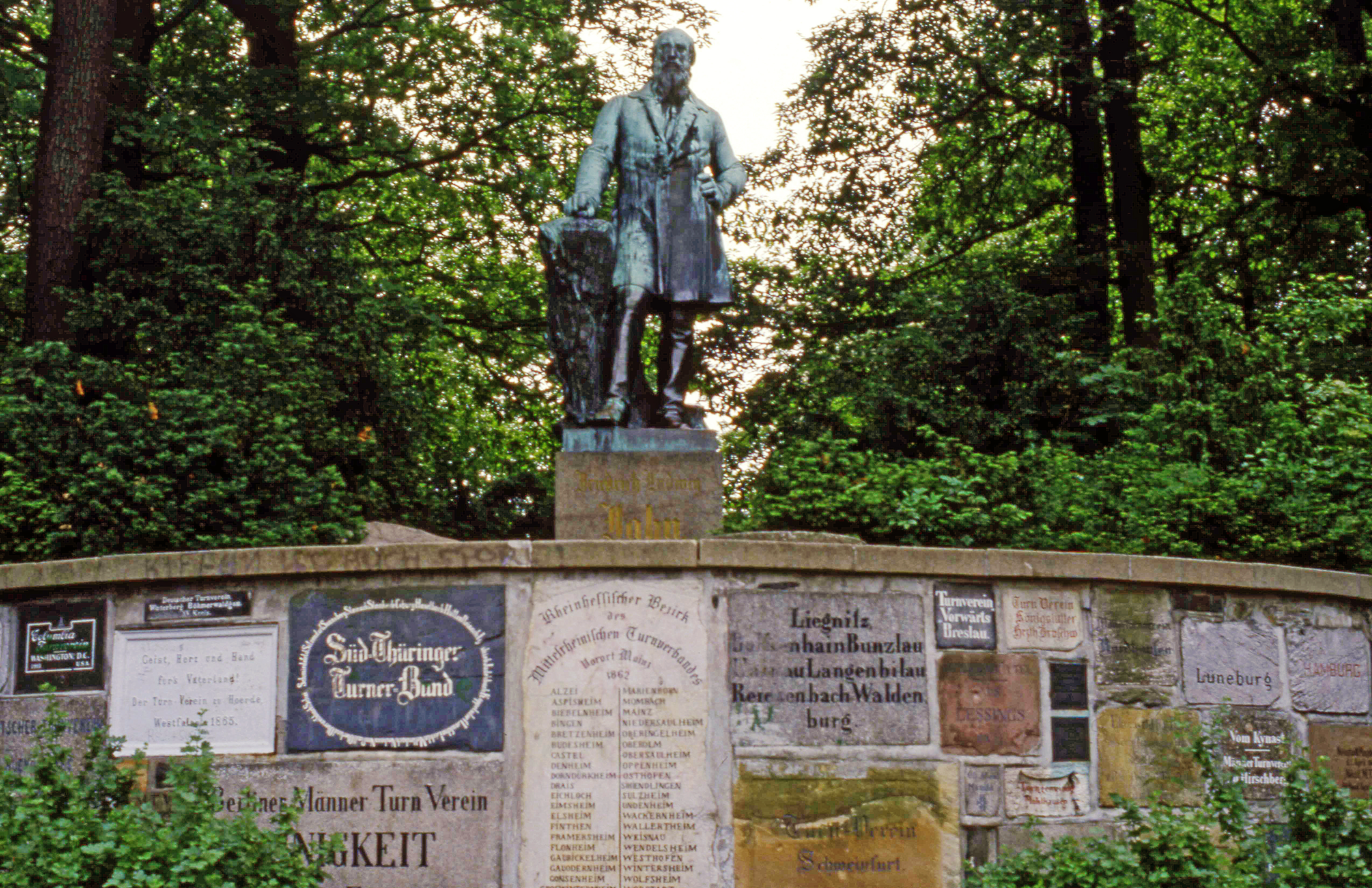
The Berlin monument

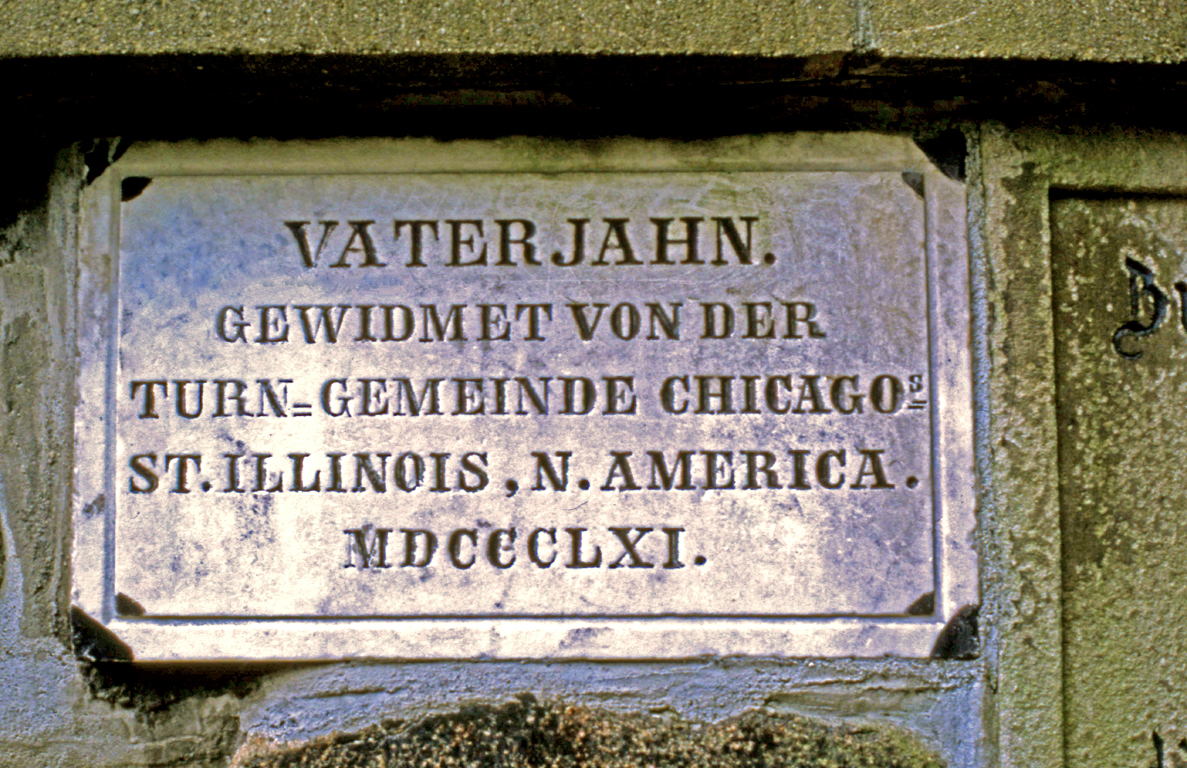
Chicago, 1861

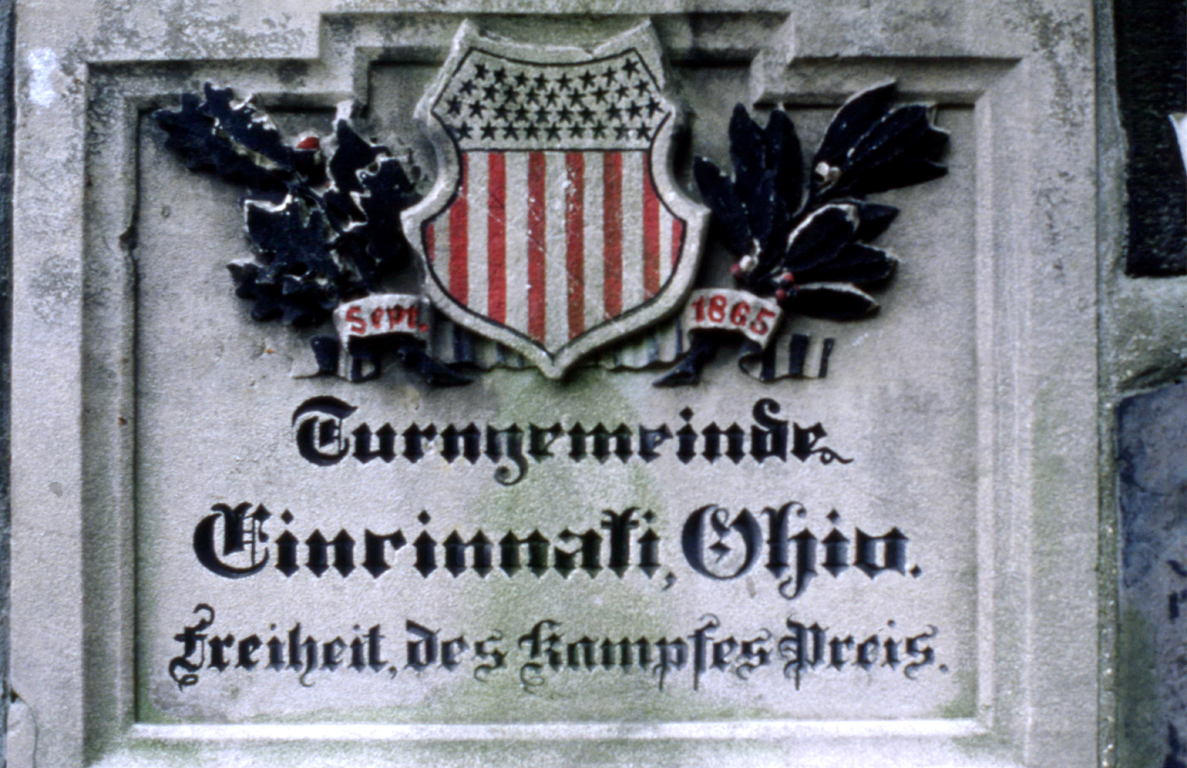
Cincinnati, 1865

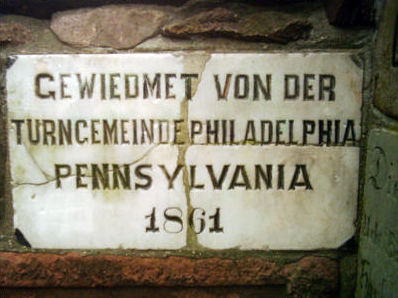
Philadelphia, 1861

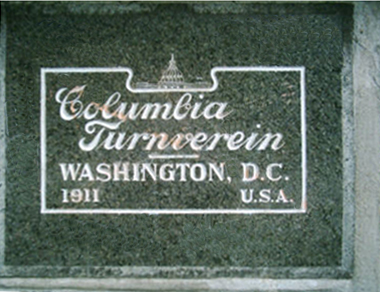
Washington, D.C., 1911

=== Turner Halls ===
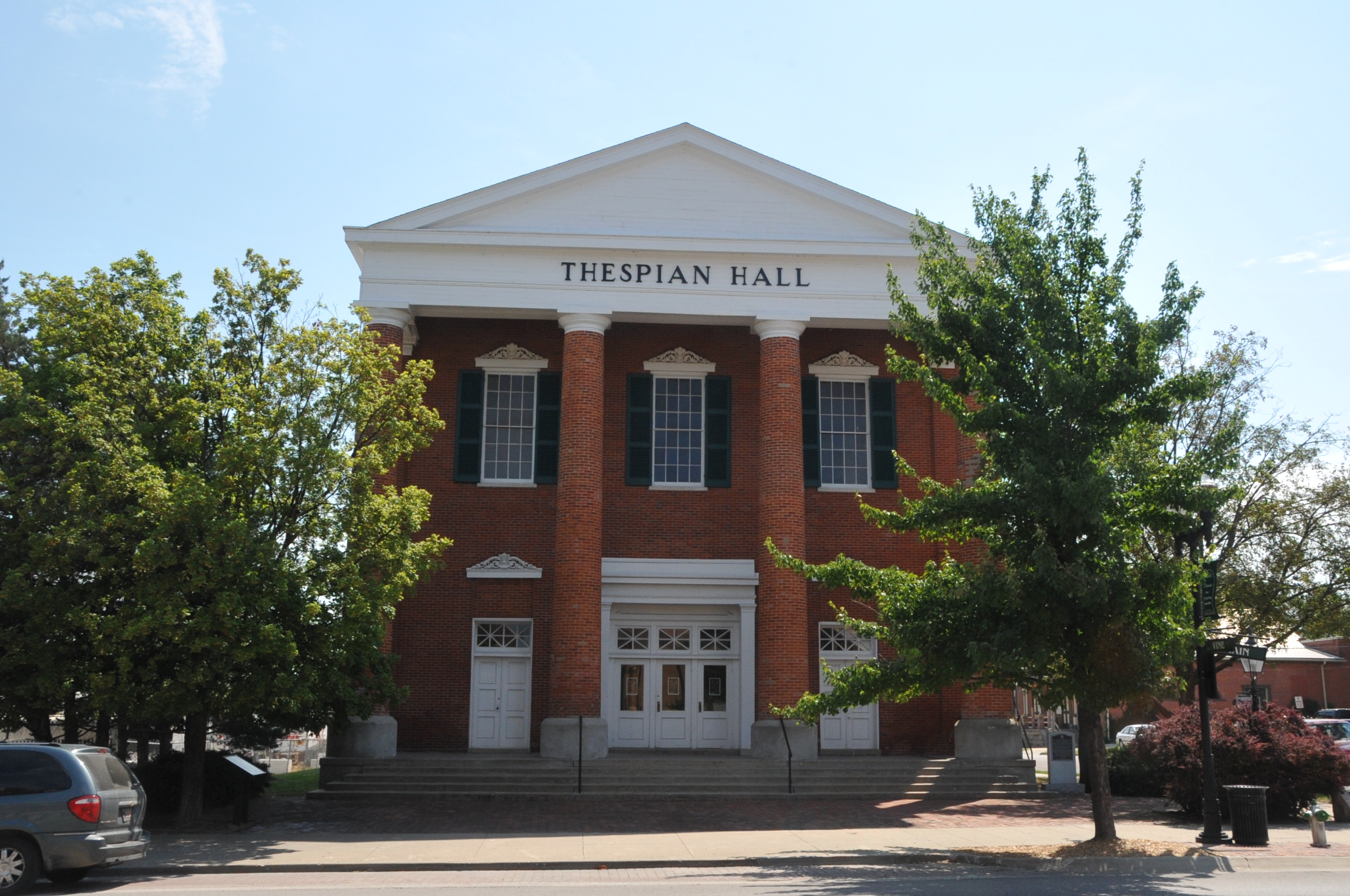
Turner Hall
Boonville, Missouri

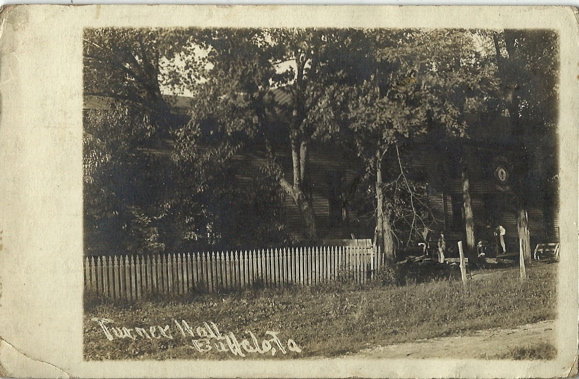
Turner Hall
Buffalo, Iowa

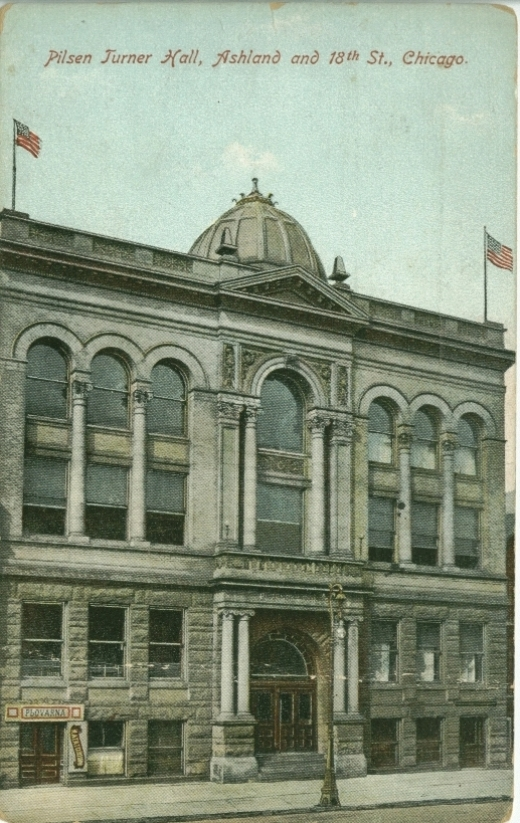
Pilsen Turner Hall, Chicago, Illinois

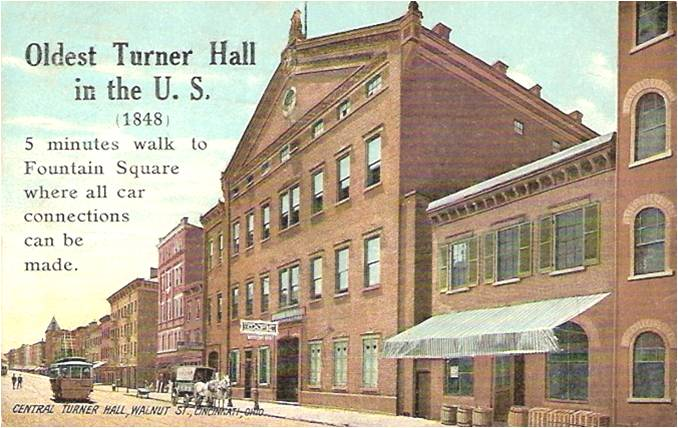
Central Turner Hall (1848), Cincinnati, Ohio

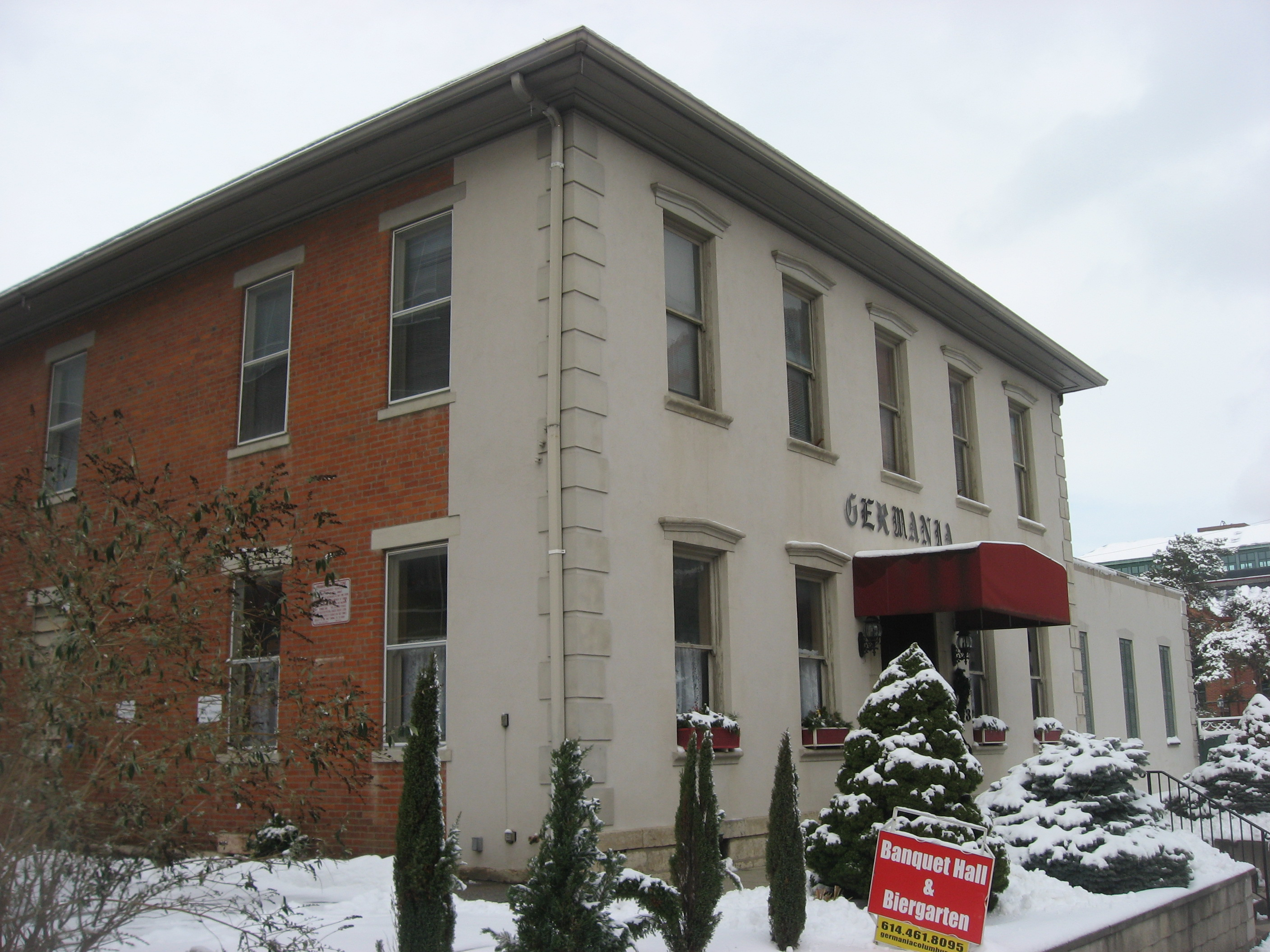
Germania Singing and Sport Society, Columbus, Ohio

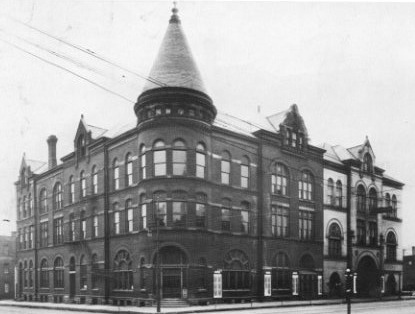
Central Turner Hall (1888), Davenport, Iowa

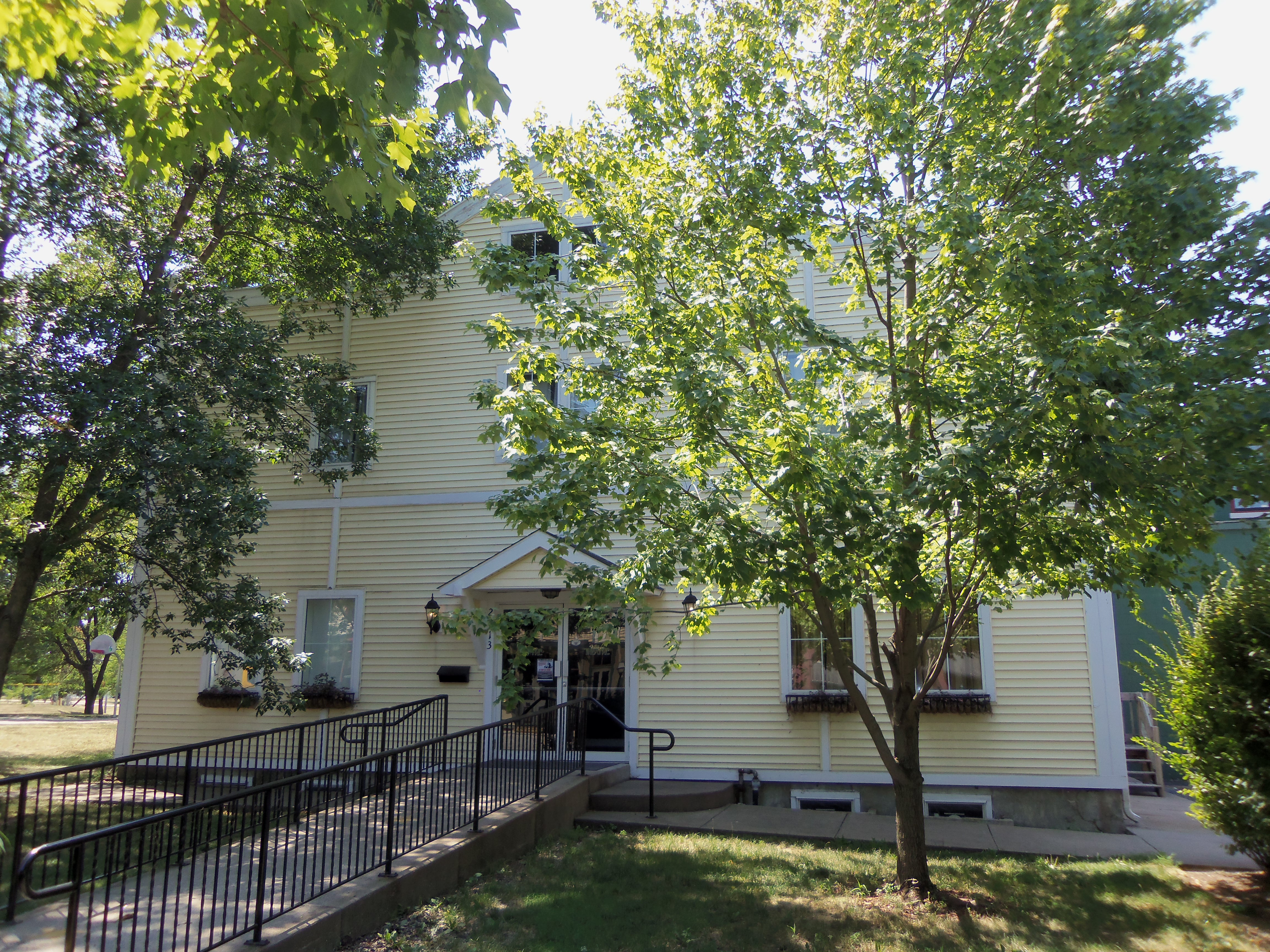
East Turner Hall (1891), Davenport, Iowa

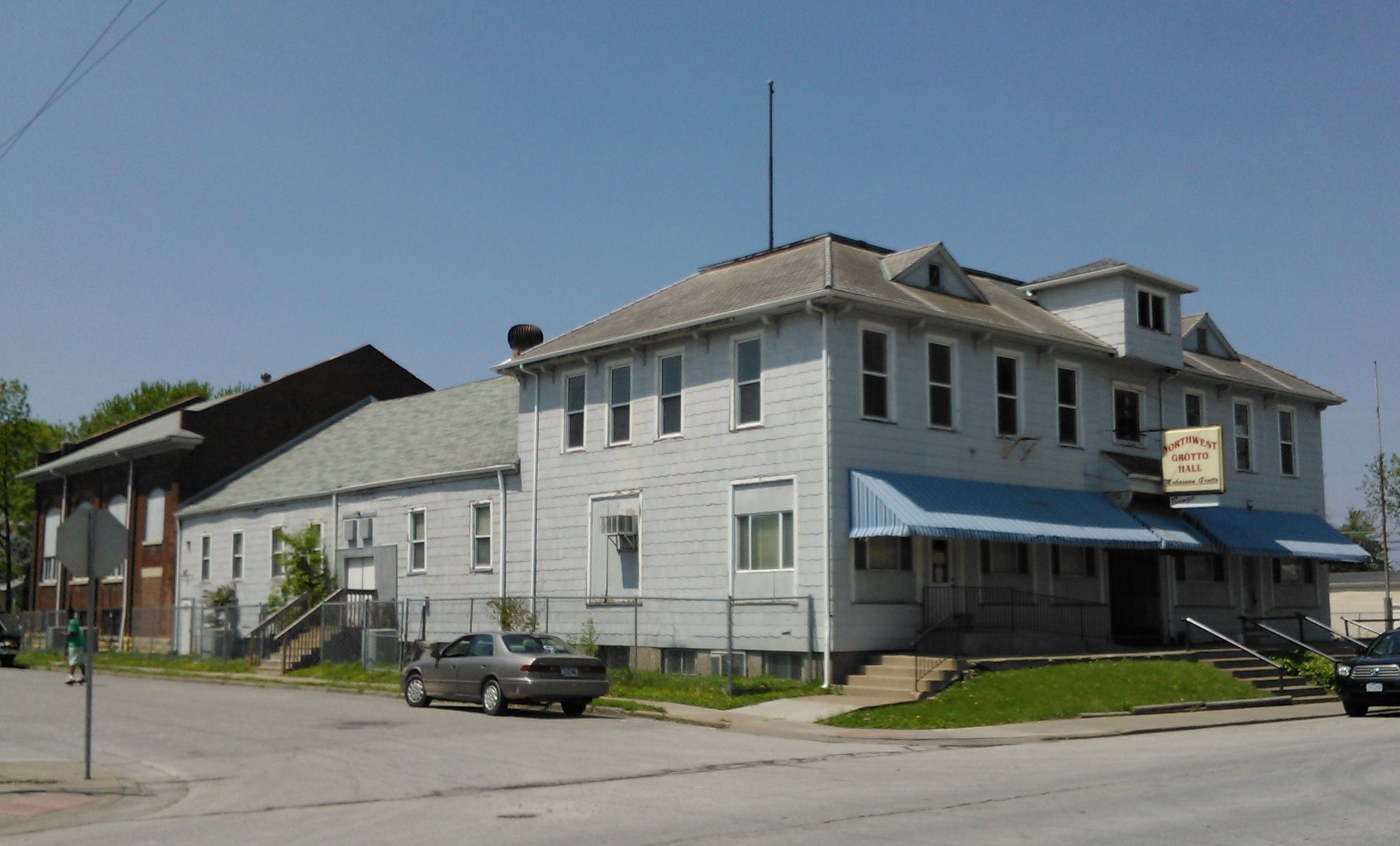
Northwest Turner Hall (1882), Davenport, Iowa

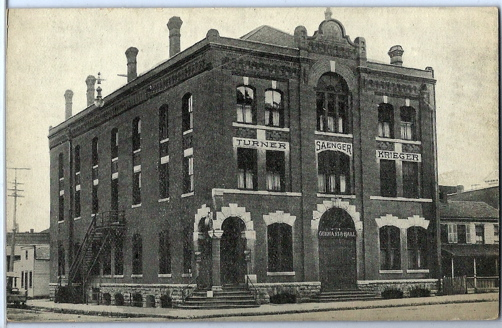
Turner Hall
Dubuque, Iowa

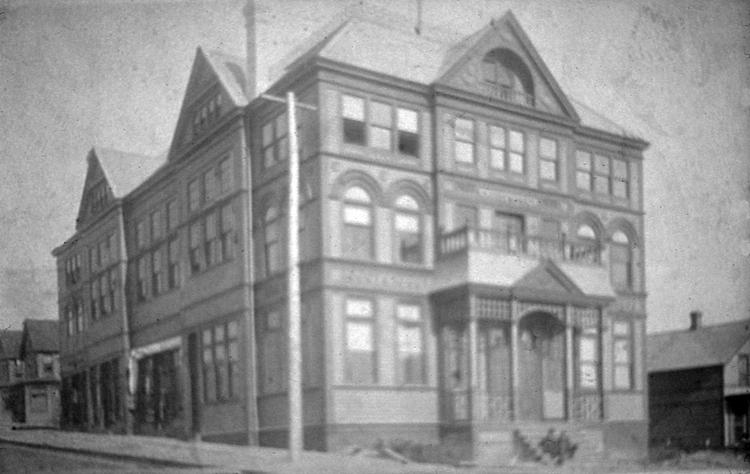
Turner Hall (1888), Duluth, Minnesota

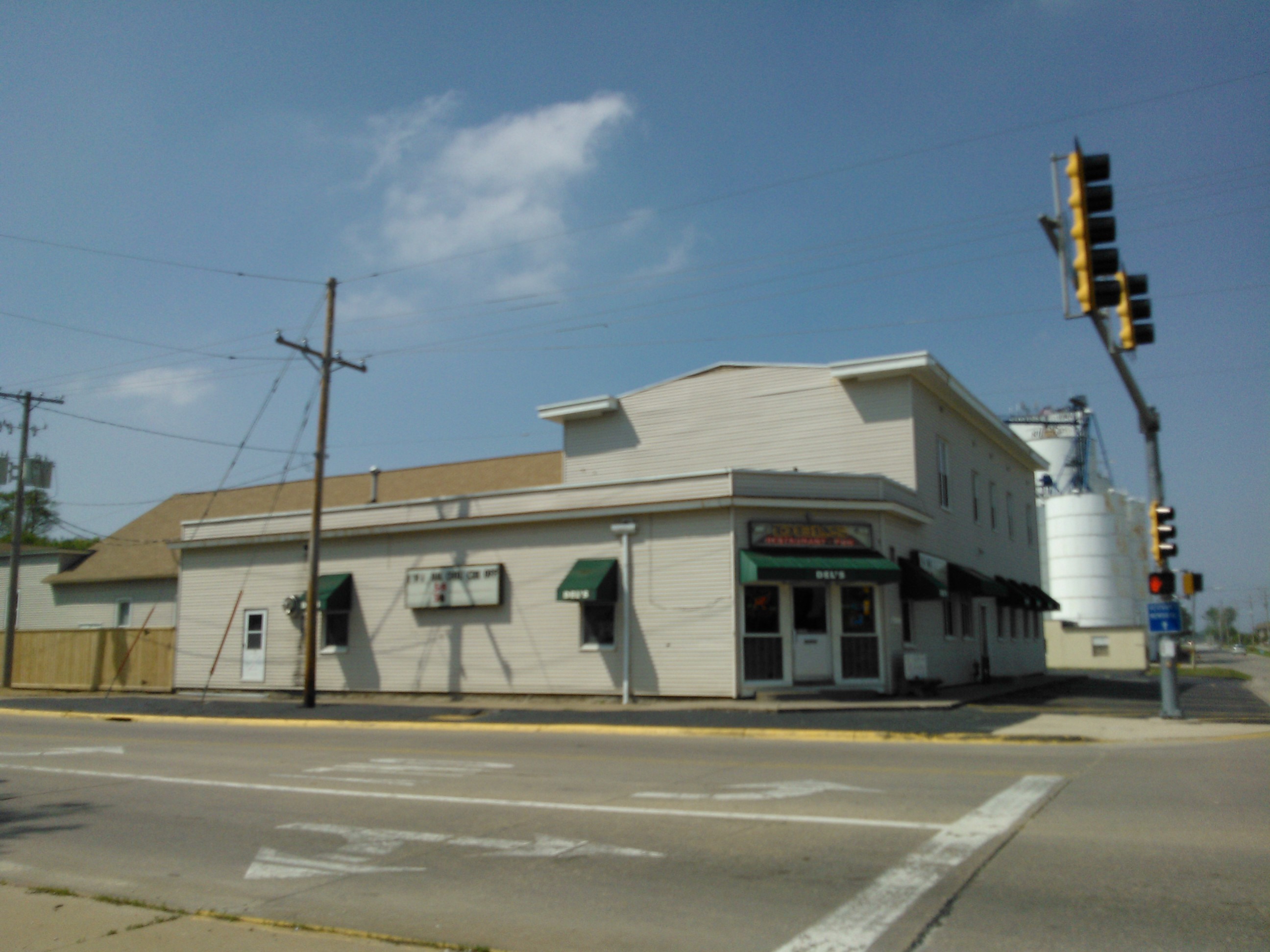
Eldridge Turn-Halle, Eldridge, Iowa

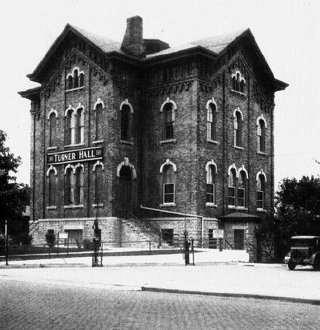
Elgin Turners
Elgin, Illinois

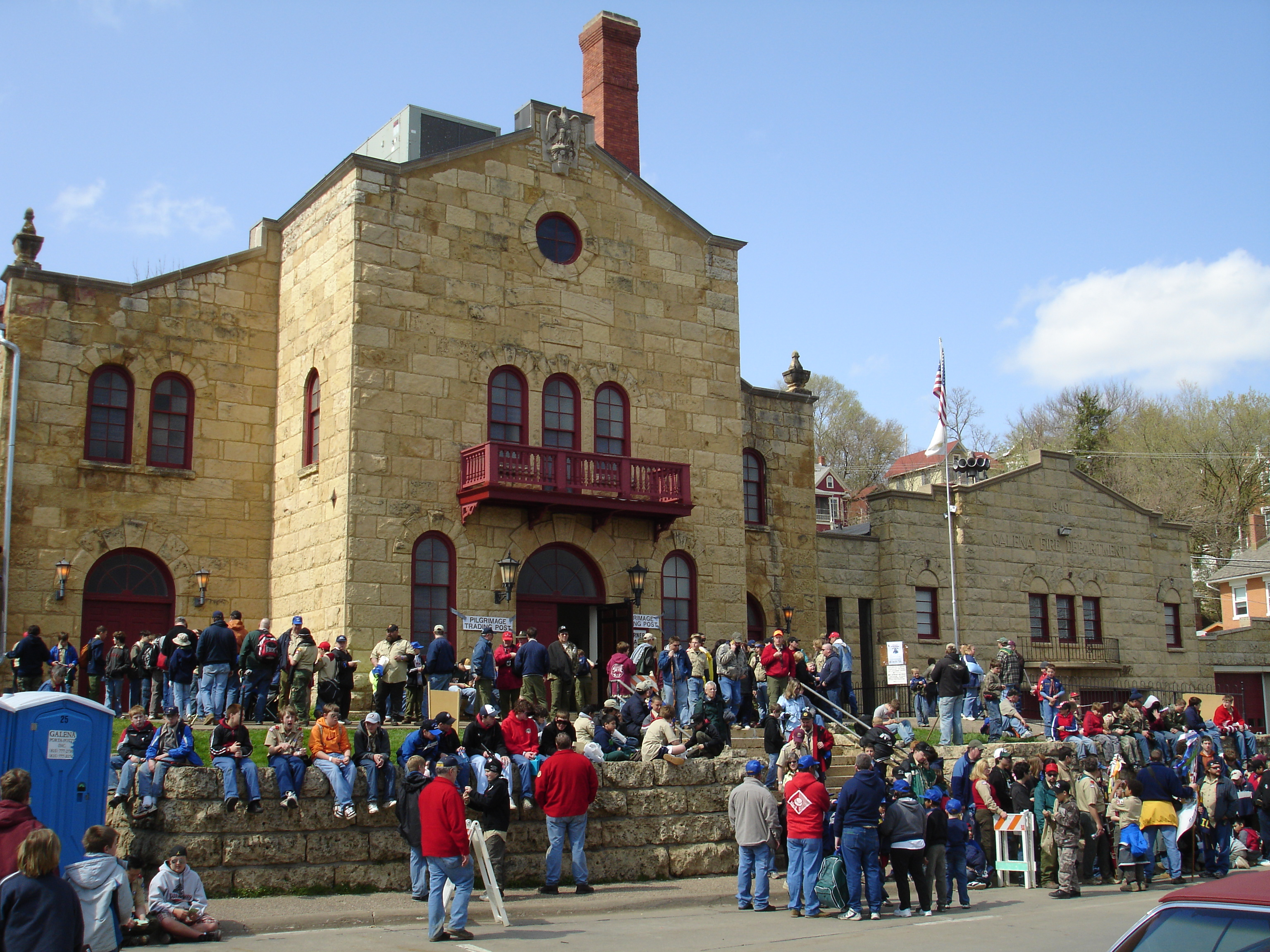
Turner Hall
Galena, Illinois

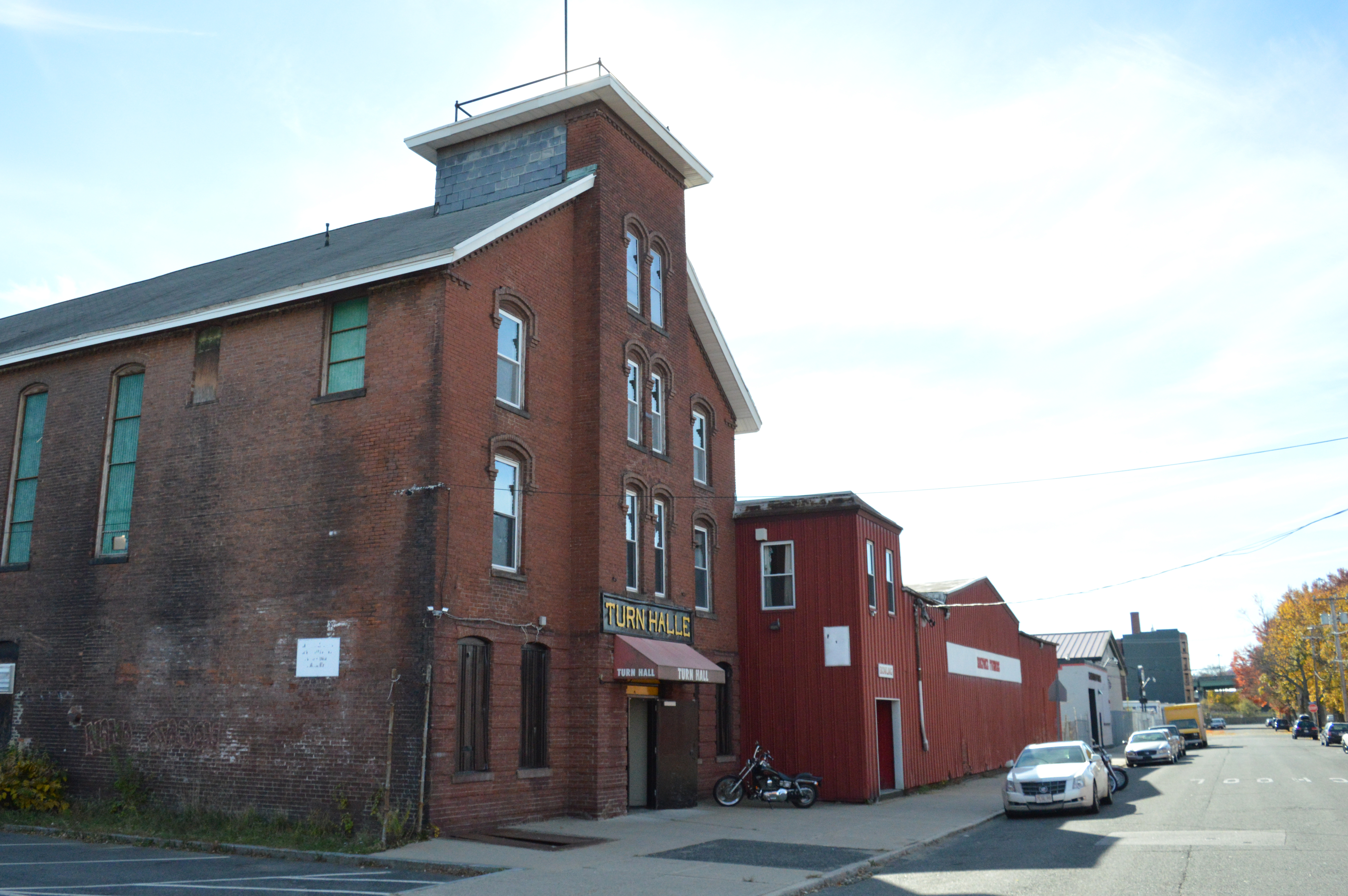
Holyoke Turner Hall
Holyoke, Massachusetts

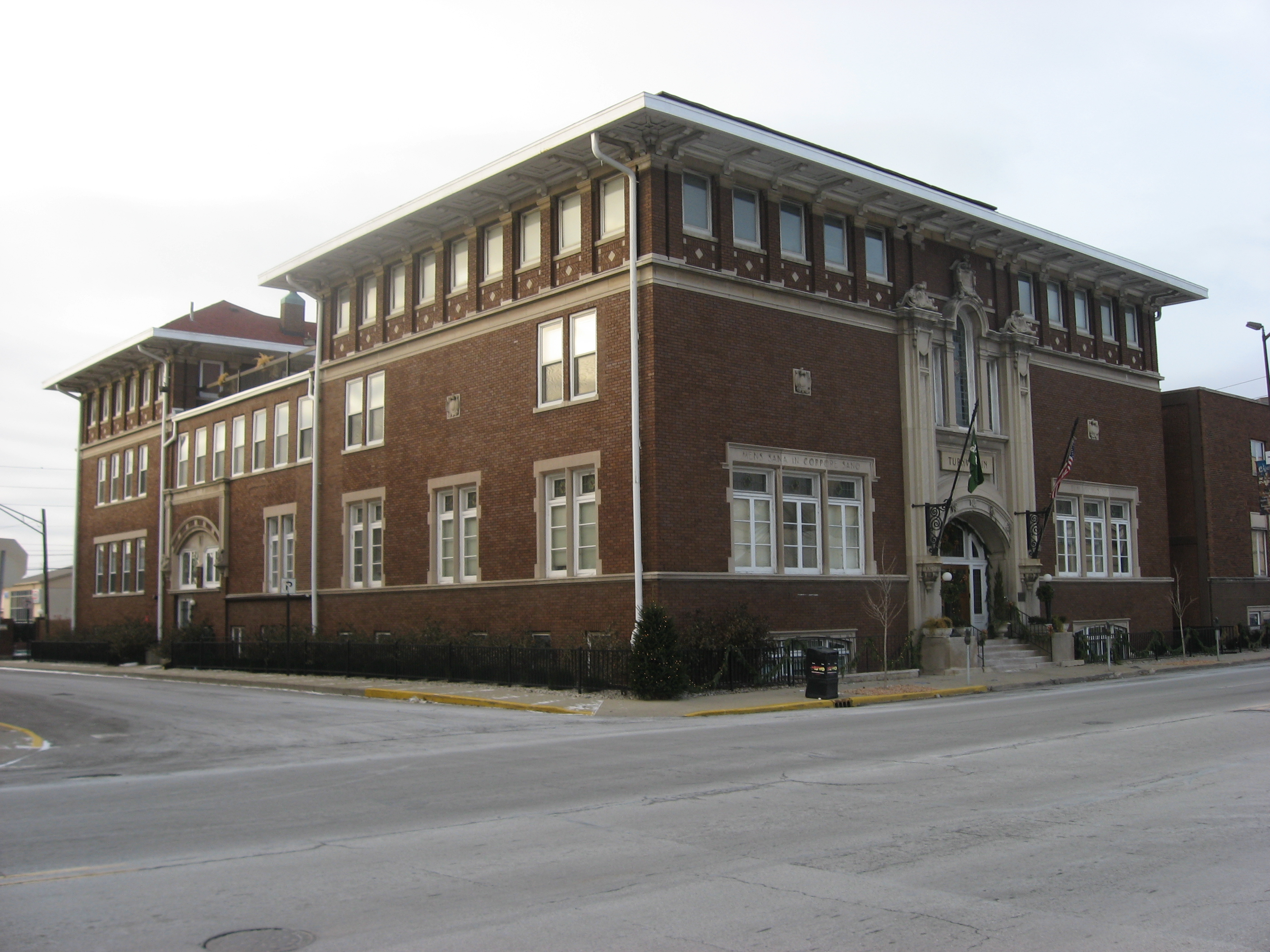
Independent Turnverein
Indianapolis, Indiana

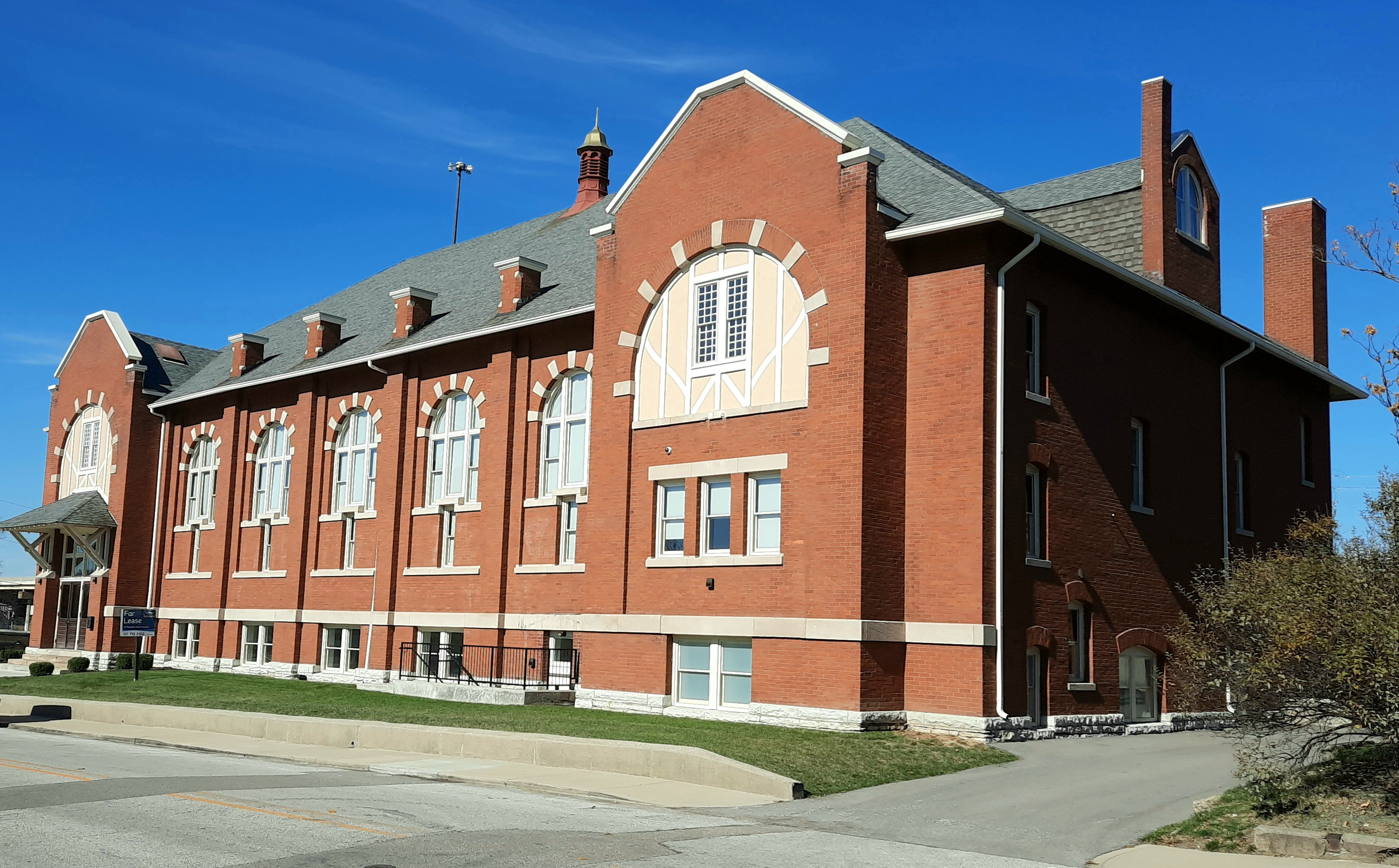
South Side Turnverein Hall (1900), Indianapolis, Indiana

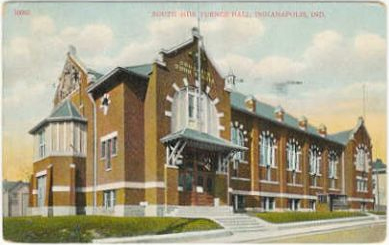
South Side Turnverein Hall, Indianapolis, Indiana

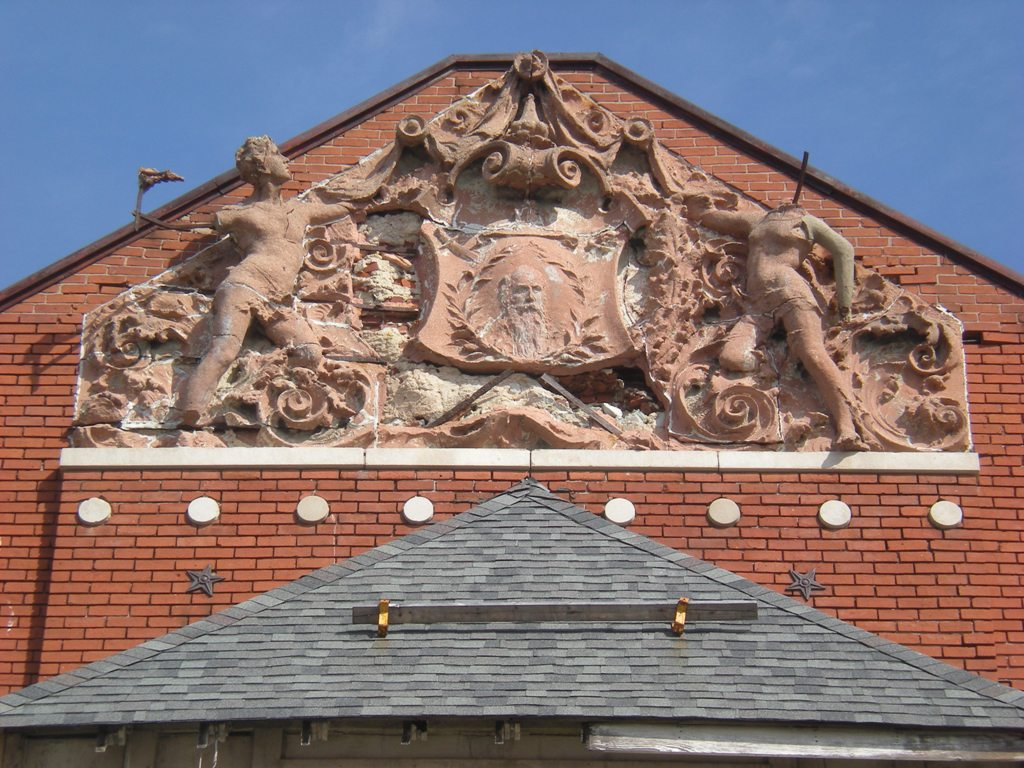
Detail, South Side Turnverin Hall, Indianapolis, Indiana

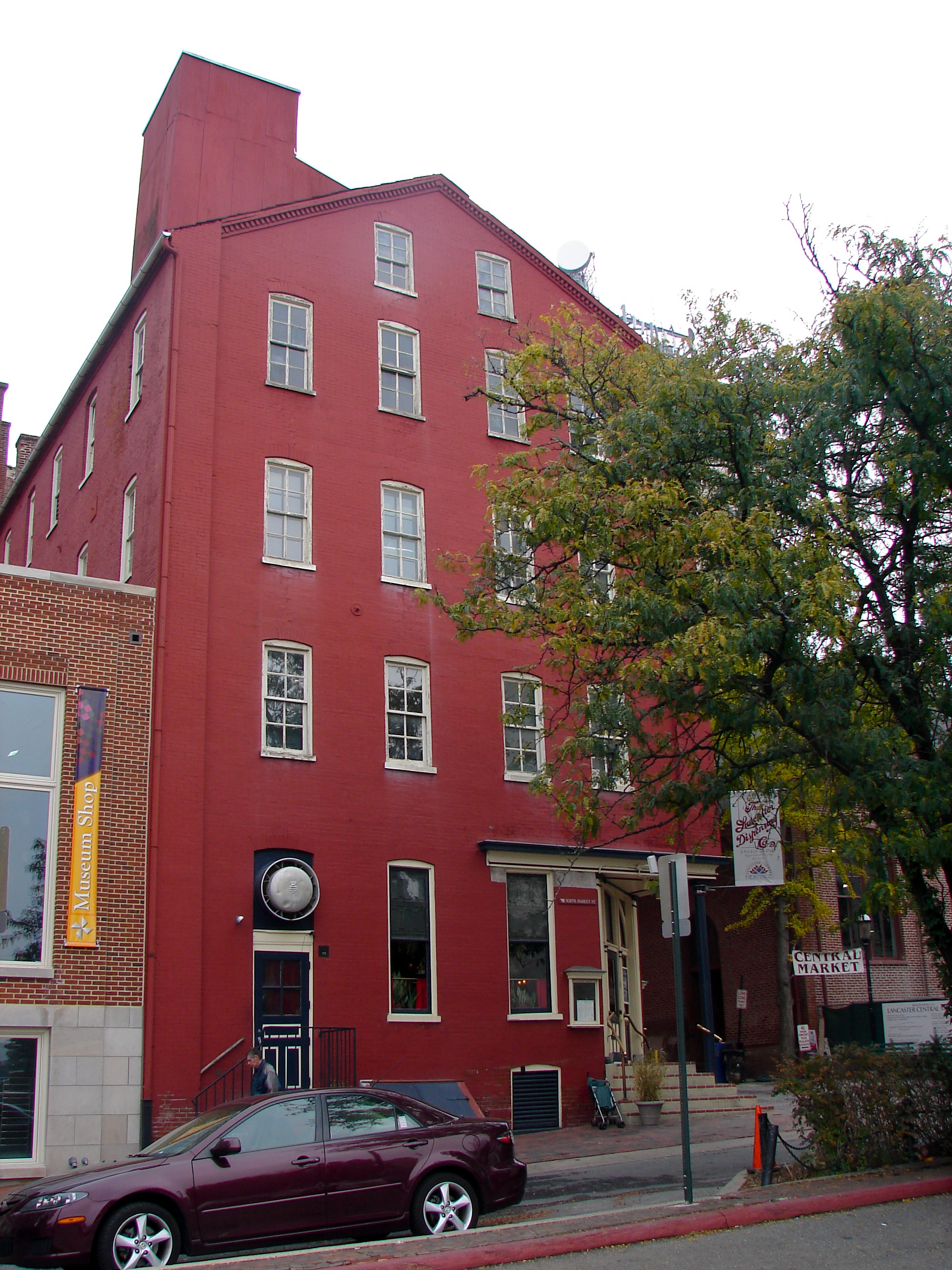
Germania Turnverein, Lancaster, Pennsylvania

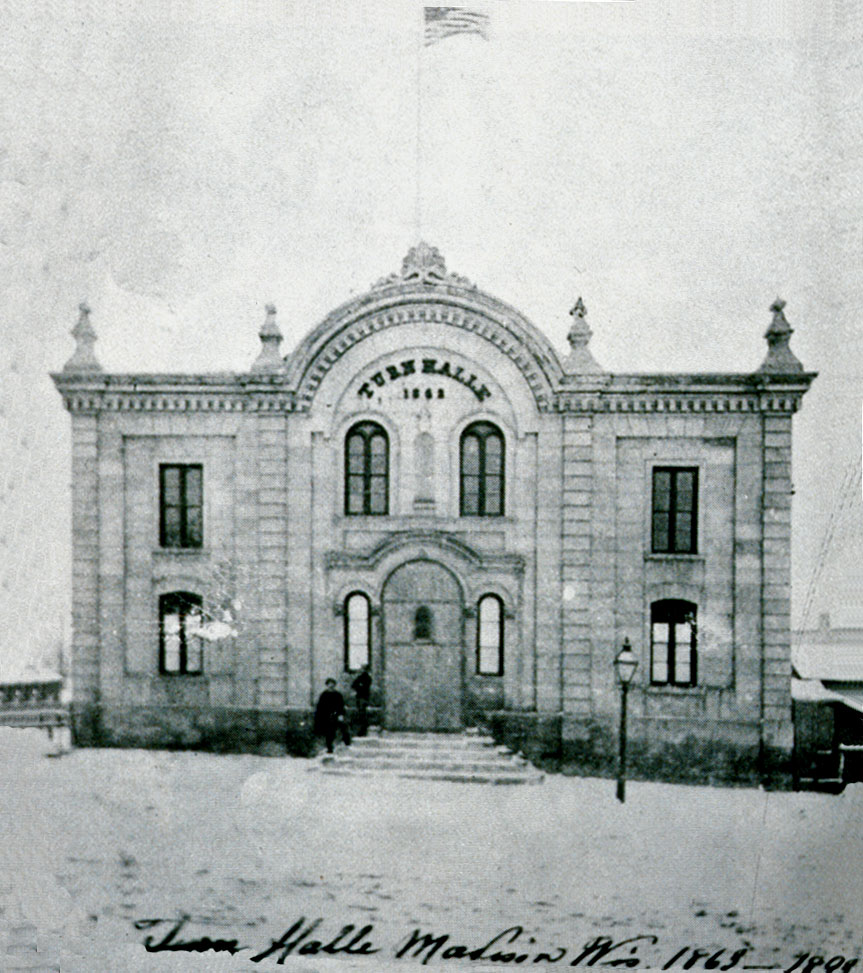
Turner Hall (1868), Madison, Wisconsin

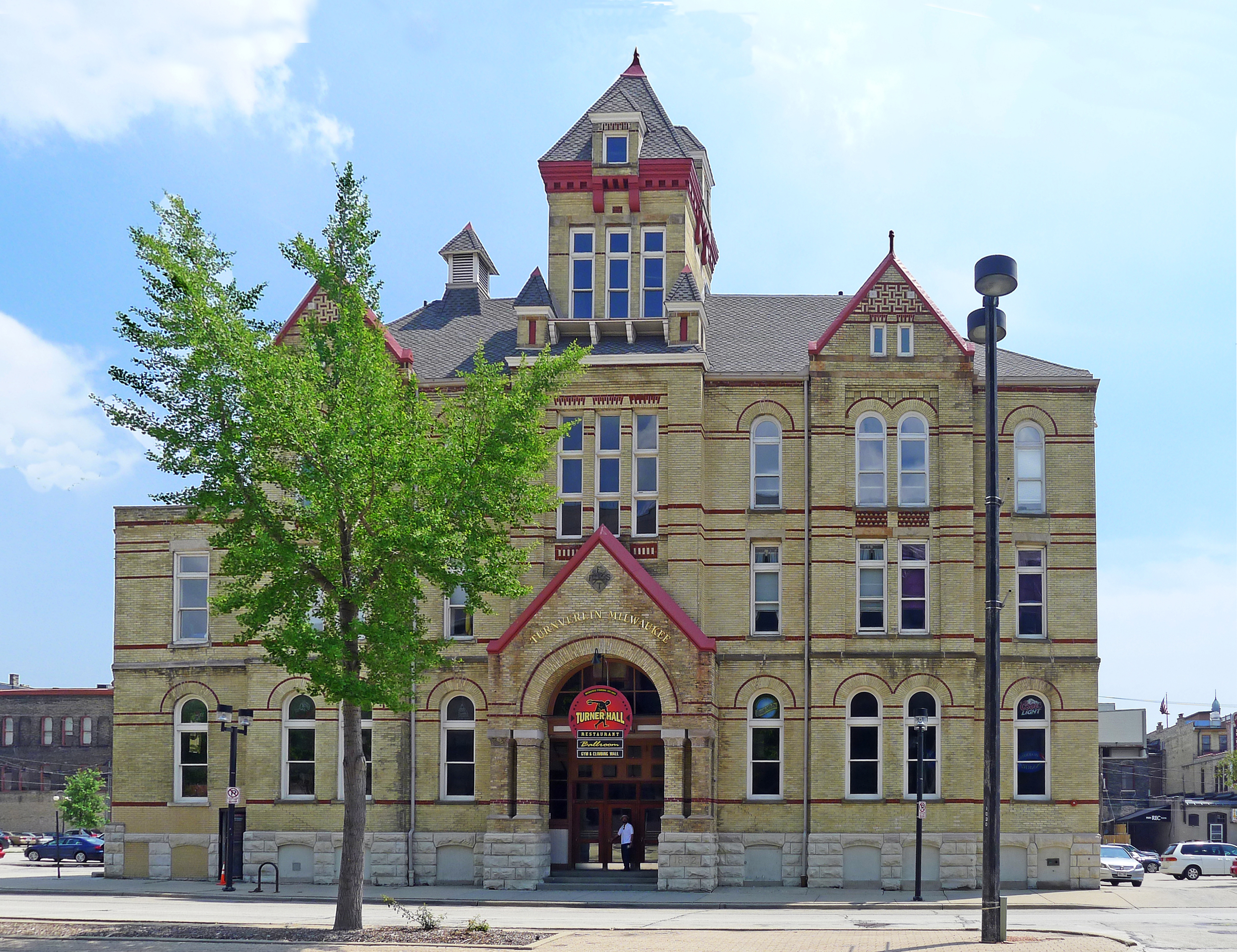
Turner Hall (1882), Milwaukee, Wisconsin

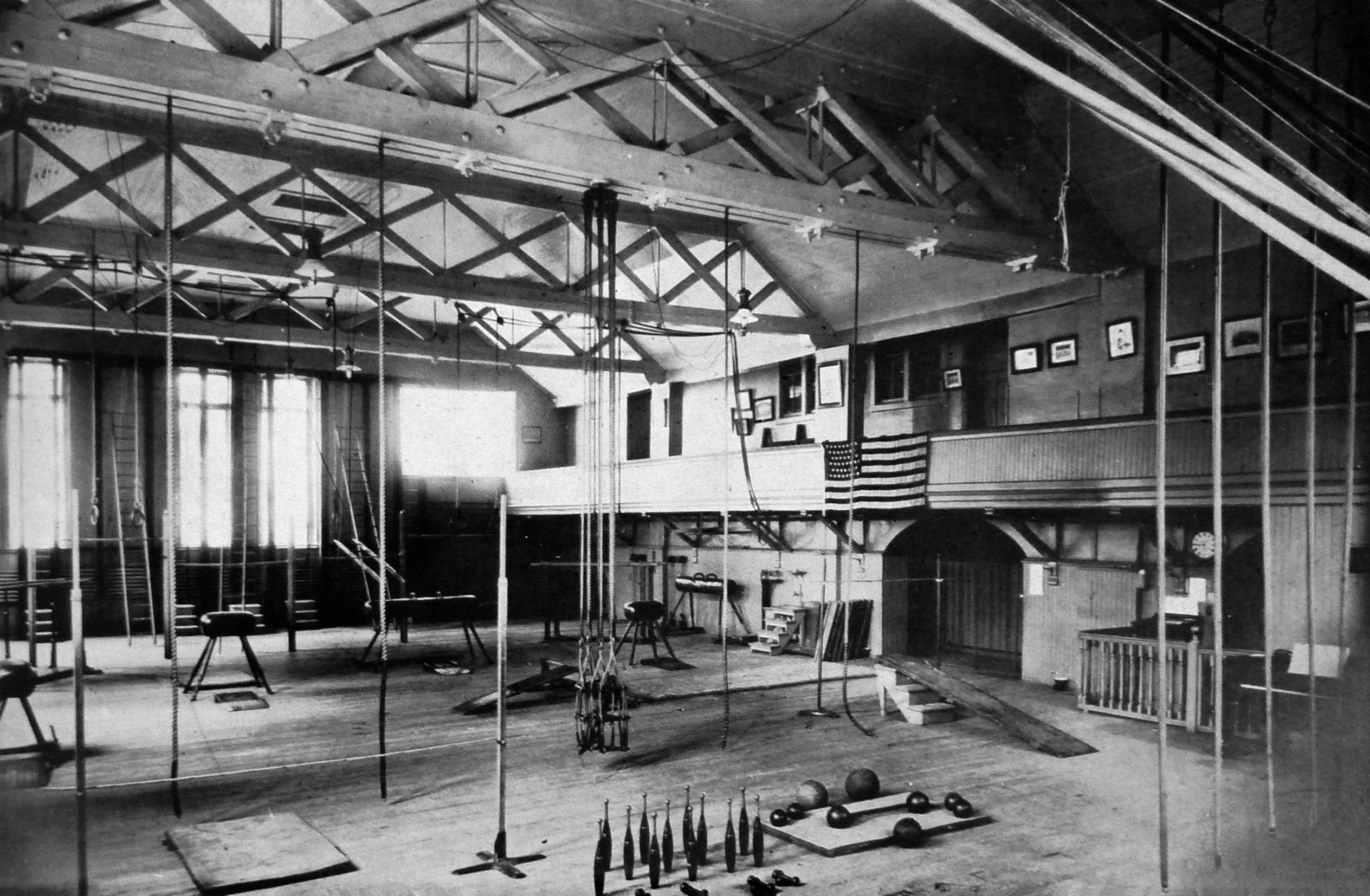
Interior ca. 1910, Turner Hall, Milwaukee, Wisconsin

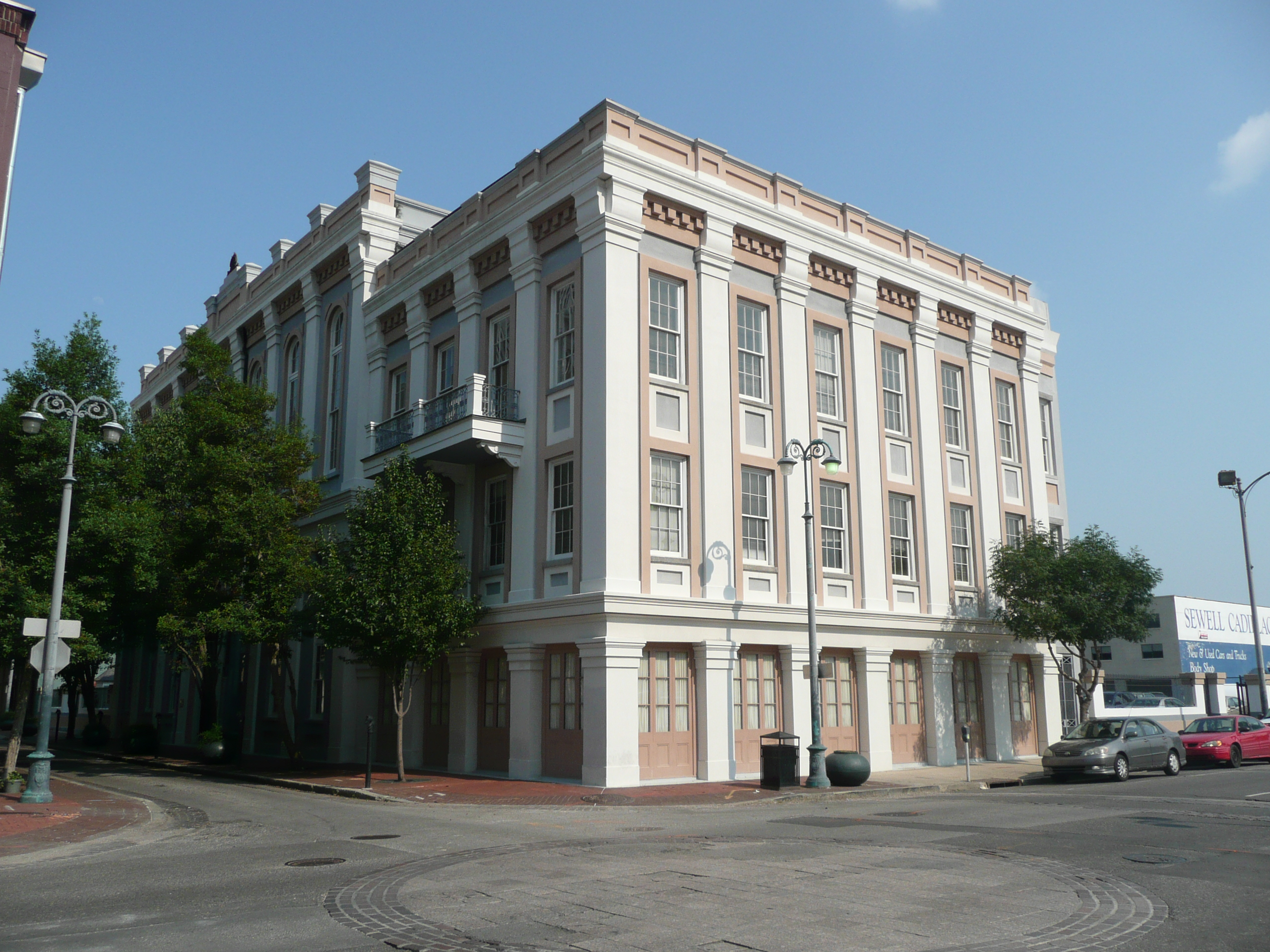
Turners Hall (1868)
New Orleans, Louisiana

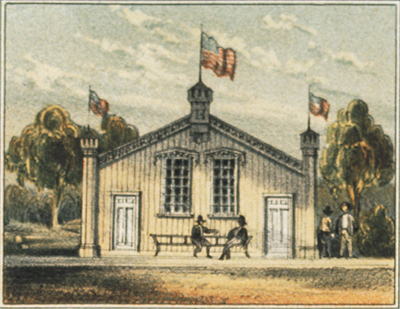
Turner Hall
New Ulm, Minnesota

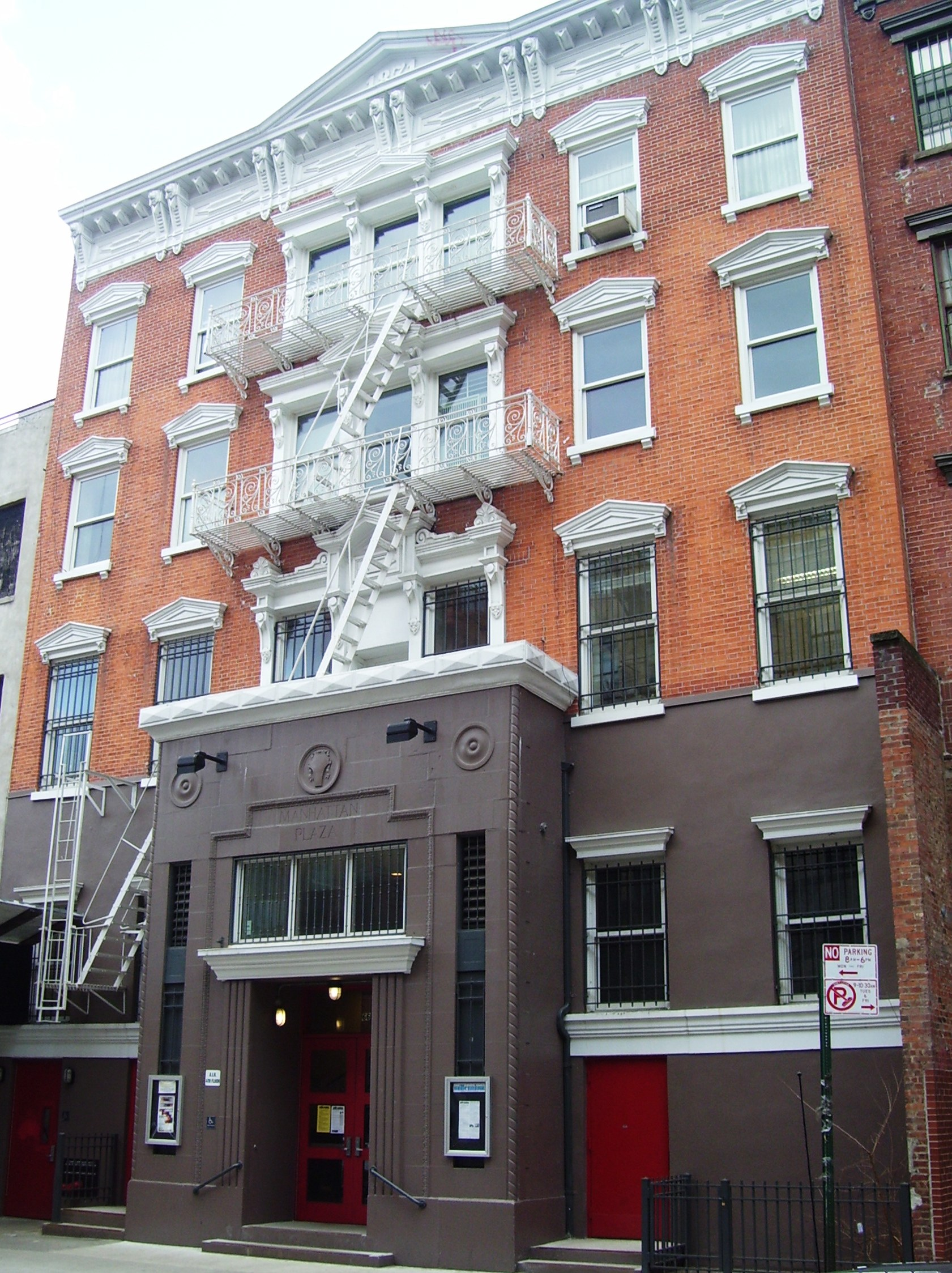
Turn-Verein, East 4th Street, New York, New York

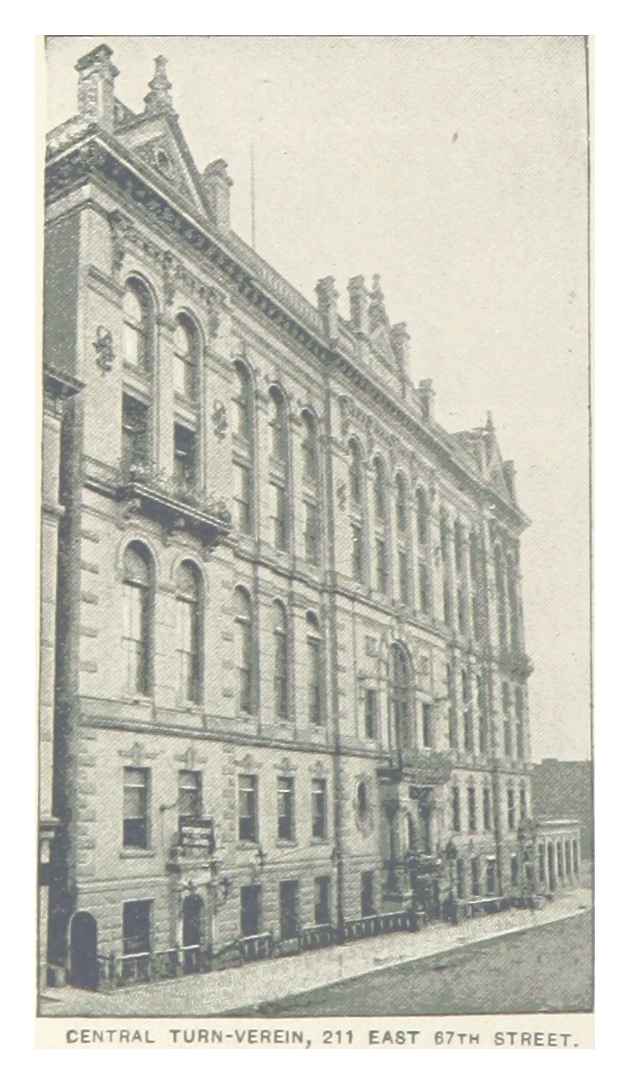
Central Turn-Verein, East 67th Street, New York, New York

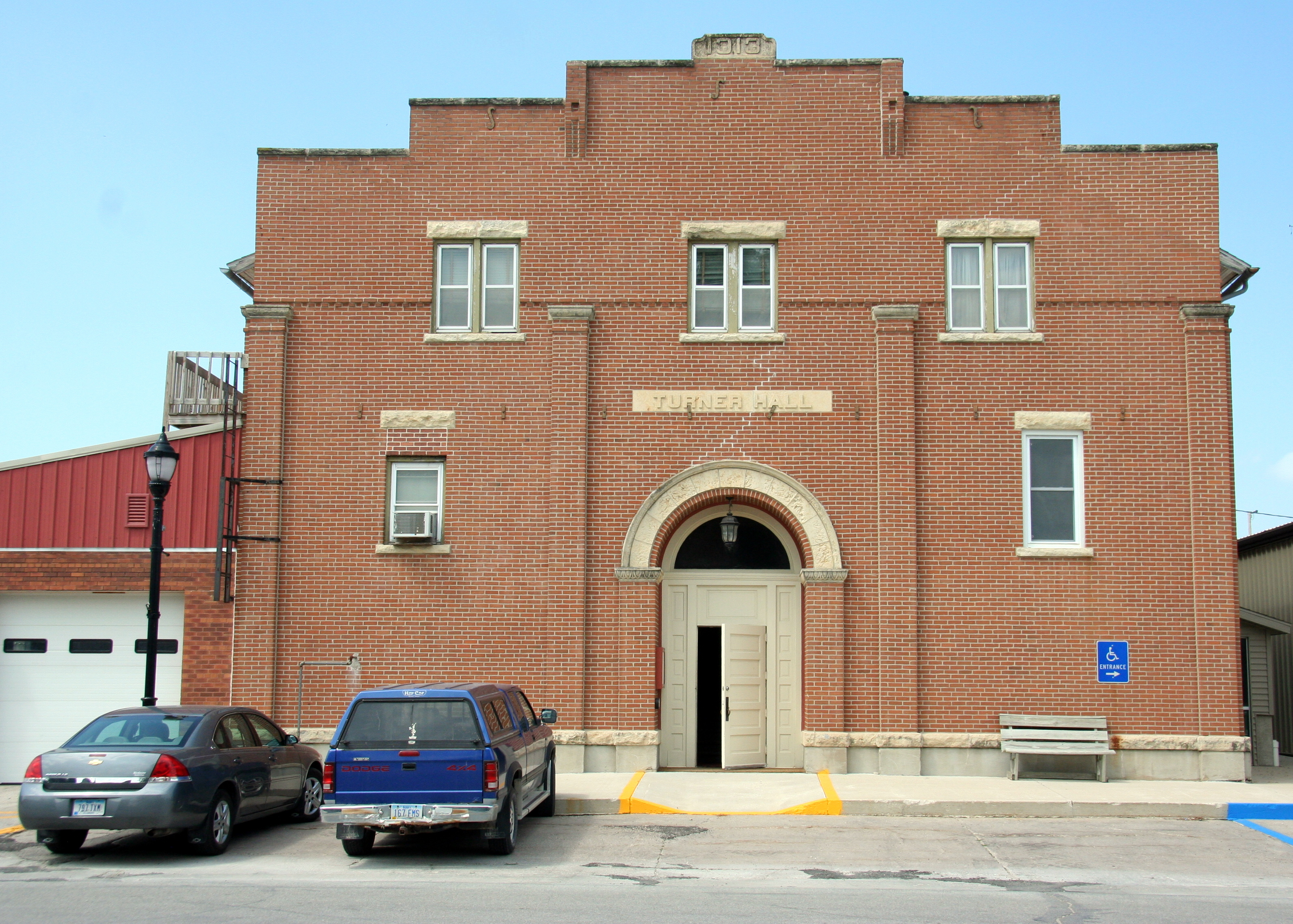
Turner Hall (1914)
Postville, Iowa

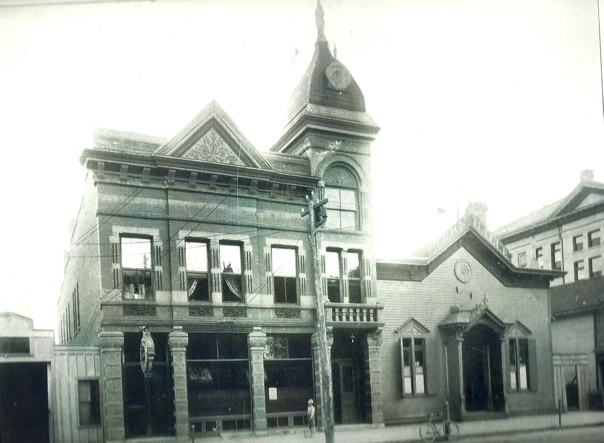
Turnhalle
Rock Island, Illinois

== See also ==
- German-Americans in the Civil War
- WMWG-LP: Owned by the Milwaukee Turners
- George Brosius
- Forty-Eighters
- Sokol, a comparable movement for Czechs in Central Europe (Austria-Hungary) and the United States
