= Plainview, Iowa =

- Census-designated place
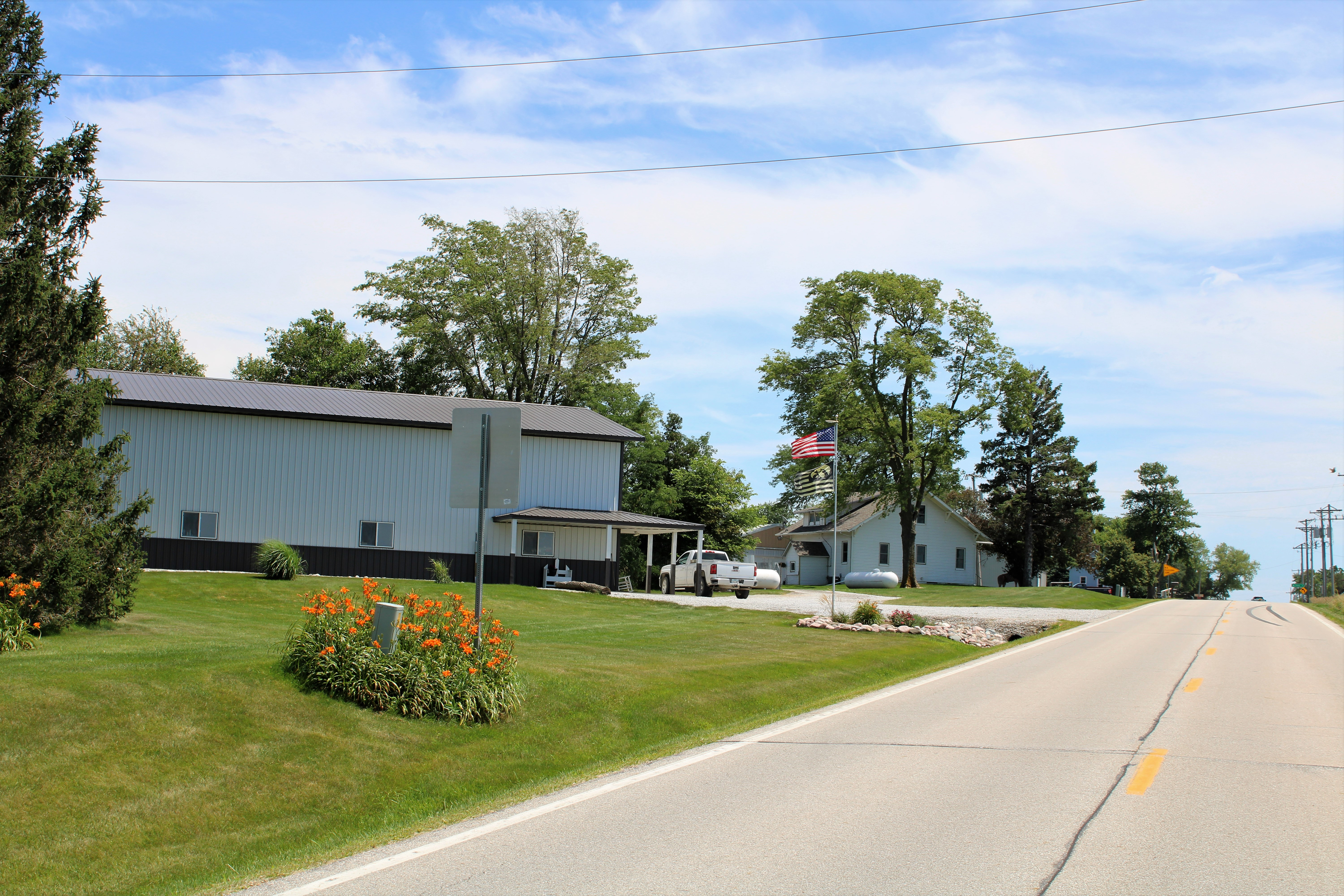
- Plainview street scene

- Location within Iowa
- Coordinates: 41°40′02″N 90°46′48″W
- Country: United States
- State: Iowa
- County: Scott

Area
  - Total: 0.55 sq mi (1.43 km^{2})
  - Land: 0.55 sq mi (1.43 km^{2})
  - Water: 0 sq mi (0.00 km^{2})
- Elevation: 728 ft (222 m)

Population (2020)
  - Total: 19
  - Density: 34.4/sq mi (13.28/km^{2})
- Time zone: UTC-6 (Central (CST))
  - Summer (DST): UTC-5 (CDT)
- ZIP code: 52773
- Area code: 563
- GNIS feature ID: 2806542

Plainview is an unincorporated community and census-designated place (CDP) in Cleona and Hickory Grove Townships, Scott County, Iowa, United States. As of the 2020 census, Plainview had a population of 19. Plainview is located along Iowa Highway 130 5.7 miles (9.2 km) north of Walcott.

== Demographics ==
Historical population
Census	Pop.	Note	%±
1940	36		—
1950	42		16.7%
1960	37		−11.9%
1970	23		−37.8%
1980	45		95.7%
2020	19		—
U.S. Decennial Census

=== 2020 census ===
As of the census of 2020, there were 19 people, 11 households, and 9 families residing in the community. The population density was 34.4 inhabitants per square mile (13.3/km^{2}). There were 12 housing units at an average density of 21.7 per square mile (8.4/km^{2}). The racial makeup of the community was 89.5% White, 0.0% Black or African American, 0.0% Native American, 0.0% Asian, 0.0% Pacific Islander, 0.0% from other races and 10.5% from two or more races. Hispanic or Latino persons of any race comprised 0.0% of the population.

Of the 11 households, 54.5% of which had children under the age of 18 living with them, 81.8% were married couples living together, 0.0% were cohabitating couples, 0.0% had a female householder with no spouse or partner present and 18.2% had a male householder with no spouse or partner present. 18.2% of all households were non-families. 18.2% of all households were made up of individuals, 0.0% had someone living alone who was 65 years old or older.

The median age in the community was 57.3 years. 5.3% of the residents were under the age of 20; 0.0% were between the ages of 20 and 24; 31.6% were from 25 and 44; 26.3% were from 45 and 64; and 36.8% were 65 years of age or older. The gender makeup of the community was 57.9% male and 42.1% female.

== History ==
Plainview's population was 27 in 1902, and 225 in 1925. The population was 18 in 1940.

Plainview was an incorporated community until 1987.

== Education ==
It is in the Davenport Community School District.

== See also ==
- List of Discontinued cities in Iowa
