= Liberty Township, Scott County, Iowa =

Liberty Township
- Township
- Location in Scott County
- Coordinates: 41°43′34″N 090°50′43″W
- Country: United States
- State: Iowa
- County: Scott

Area
  - Total: 36.29 sq mi (93.98 km^{2})
  - Land: 36.27 sq mi (93.93 km^{2})
  - Water: 0.019 sq mi (0.05 km^{2}) 0.05%
- Elevation: 761 ft (232 m)

Population (2000)
  - Total: 746
  - Density: 20/sq mi (7.9/km^{2})
- GNIS feature ID: 0468229

Liberty Township is a township in Scott County, Iowa, USA. As of the 2000 census, its population was 746.

== Geography ==
Liberty Township covers an area of 36.29 square miles (94.0 km^{2}) and contains two incorporated settlements: Dixon and New Liberty. According to the USGS, it contains six cemeteries: Big Rock, Dixon, New Liberty, Pioneer, Round Grove and Saint Patricks.
