= Iowa Highway 130 =

State highway in Iowa, United States

Iowa Highway 130
- Iowa 130 highlighted in red

Route information
- Maintained by Iowa DOT
- Length: 32.023 mi (51.536 km)
- Existed: 1969–present

Major junctions
- West end: Iowa 38 in Tipton
- East end: I-80 / US 61 at Davenport

Location
- Country: United States
- State: Iowa
- Counties: Cedar; Scott

Highway system
- Iowa Primary Highway System; Interstate; US; State; Secondary; Scenic
← I-129	→ US 136

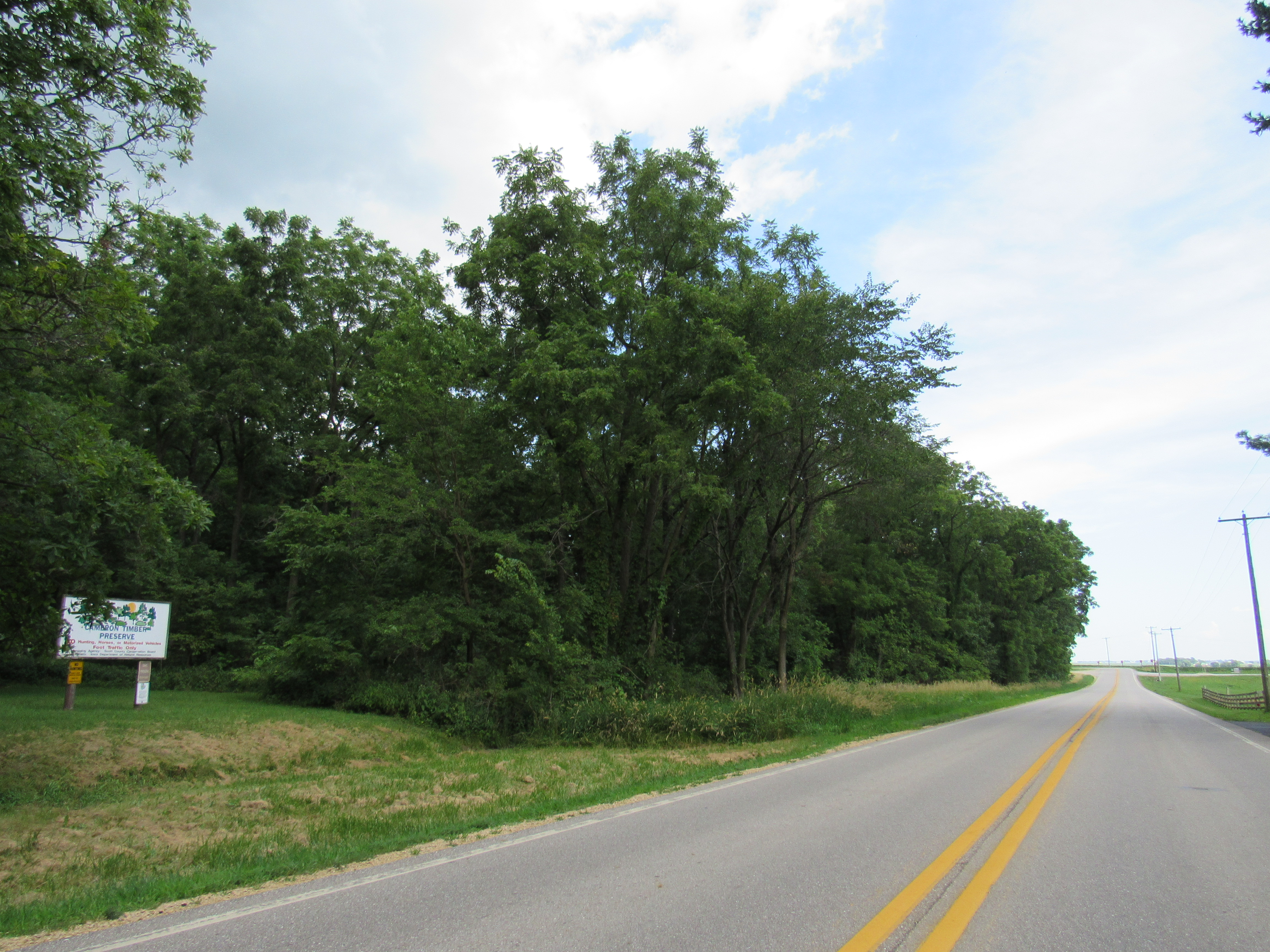
Iowa Highway 130 as it passes Cameron Woods State Preserve.

Iowa Highway 130 (Iowa 130) is a 32-mile-long (51 km) state highway that traverses northwestern Scott County and eastern Cedar County in eastern Iowa. It begins in Tipton at Iowa 38 and ends at Interstate 80 (I-80) / U.S. Highway 61 (US 61) in Davenport. The highway was designated in 1969 as part of a renumbering of state highways throughout the state. From 1949 to the renumbering, the route was part of Iowa 150; before that, it was known as Iowa 74.

== Route description ==
Iowa Highway 130 begins in Tipton at an intersection with Iowa Highway 38. It proceeds eastward from Tipton and shortly before Bennett, it turns south to enter town. From Bennett, it goes east, turning southeast to go through New Liberty. It continues southeast through Plainview and Maysville and ends at exit 292 along Interstate 80 in Davenport.

== History ==
Iowa Highway 130 was designated in 1969, along a section of Iowa Highway 150. Until the mid-1970s, Highway 130 extended to US 61 / US 67 along the Davenport riverfront. By the 1980s, a portion of Harrison and Brady Streets had become one-way streets, joining near Vander Veer Park, leading to Iowa 130 to be truncated at the park. When Welcome Way was completed in 1983 and southbound traffic was moved onto Harrison Street, Iowa 130 was truncated further back to Interstate 80.

== Major intersections ==
County	Location	mi	km	Destinations	Notes
Cedar	Tipton	0.000	0.000	Iowa 38 (Cedar Street)	
Scott	Davenport	32.023	51.536	I-80 / US 61 – Des Moines, Chicago	
1.000 mi = 1.609 km; 1.000 km = 0.621 mi
