= Cameron Woods State Preserve =

Nature reserve in Iowa, United States

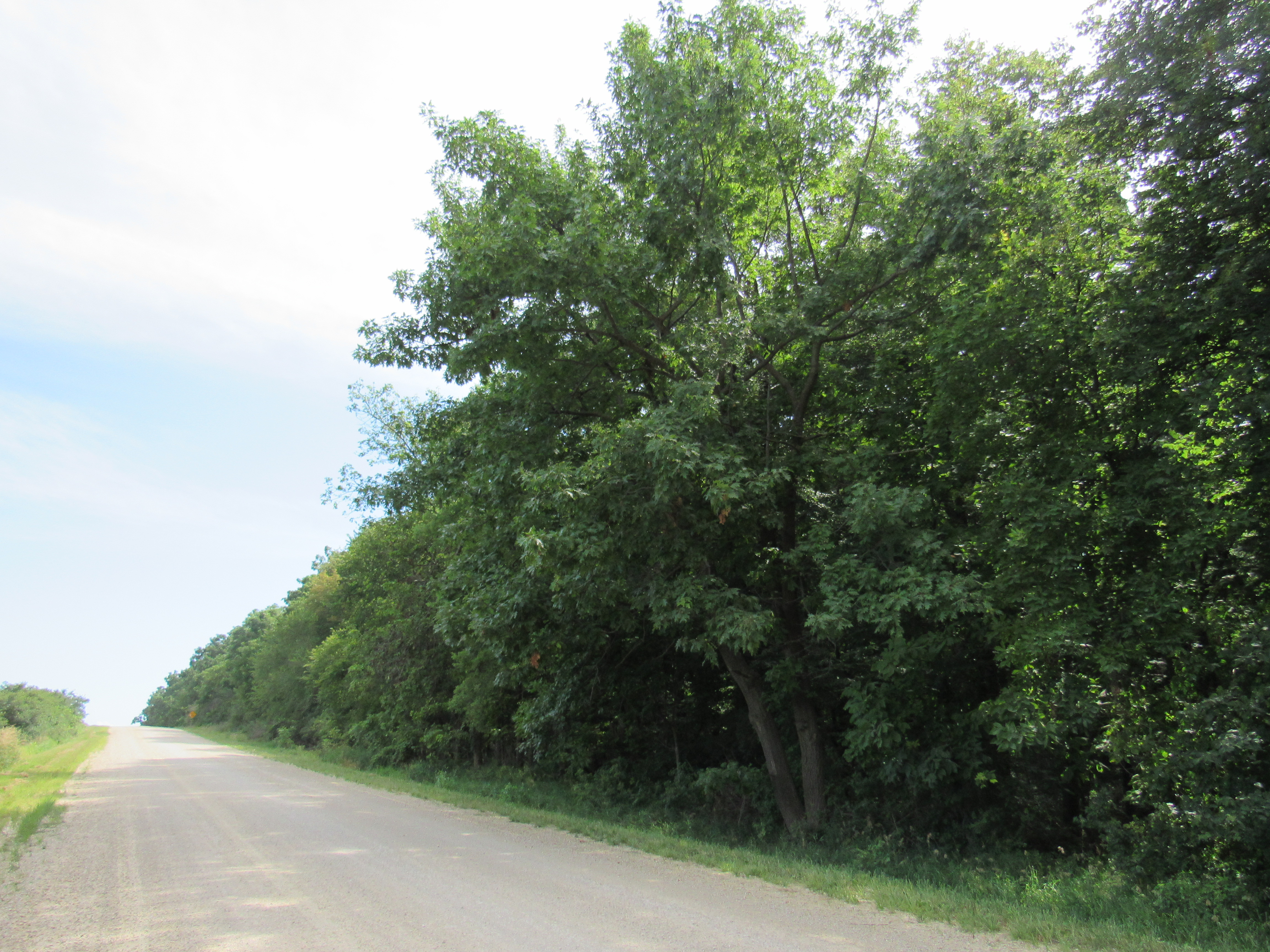

- Location within Iowa Location within the United States
- Location: Scott, Iowa, United States
- Coordinates: 41°39′09″N 90°44′09″W
- Area: 36 acres (15 ha)
- Elevation: 682 ft (208 m)
- Established: 1978
- Governing body: Scott County Conservation Board

Cameron Woods State Preserve is a nature reserve in rural Scott County, Iowa, United States. It is located along Iowa Highway 130 west of Maysville, and it is maintained by the Scott County Conservation Board as one of the Iowa state preserves.

Cameron Woods is a remnant of what was a much larger stand of timber. It is shown on an 1837 vegetation plat map that was created by the United States General Land Office when Scott County was opened to settlement.

The 36-acre (15 ha) preserve features rolling hills whose slopes are covered with loess, which is generally found in the eastern section of the Southern Iowa Drift Plain. The land gradually descends north toward Hickory Creek. The preserve is covered by a hardwood forest that is dominated by red oak, but there are several white oak trees that are around 175 years old. It also contains spring flora such as bloodroot, Downy yellow violet, squirrel corn, columbine, and Starry False Solomon’s-seal. Birds found in the preserve include brown creeper, Baltimore orioles, rose-breasted grosbeak, song sparrow, as well as various warblers, and woodpeckers. Hunting is not allowed in the preserve.

The Iowa Conservation Commission bought the property in 1977, and it was set aside as a biological state preserve the following year. A plant inventory in 2012 revealed that non-native plant species such as garlic mustard, amur honeysuckle, and nettles are invading the preserve. Hackberries, which is a native species, are replacing some of the hardwood trees.
