= Willard Barrows =

American civil engineer (1806–1868)

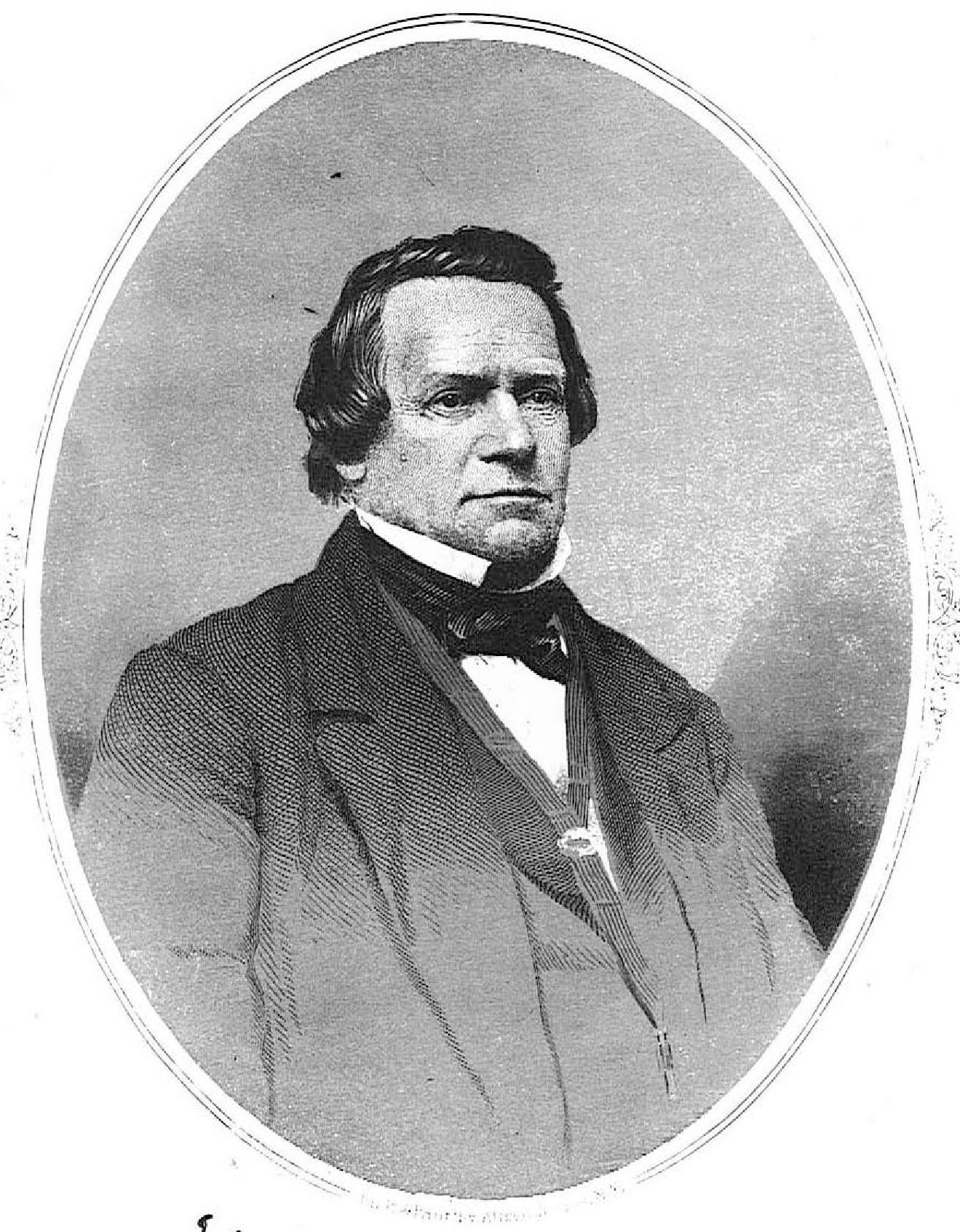
- Born: 1806
- Died: 1868 (aged 61–62)
- Occupation: Civil engineer

Willard Barrows (1806 – 1868) was an American civil engineer.

Willard Barrows was born in 1806 in Monson, Massachusetts. His early youth was spent in New England, after which he became a teacher in Elizabeth, New Jersey, but this occupation he soon relinquished for the profession of civil engineering. He accomplished the government survey of the lands vacated by the removal of the Choctaw nation in Mississippi, finishing that work in 1835. Later he explored Cedar River, which at that time was scarcely known, and in 1837 was engaged on the first surveys of Iowa. In 1840 he surveyed the islands in Mississippi River between Rock Island and Quincy. During the suspension of the surveys he settled in Rockingham; but in 1843, when the surveys were resumed, he was sent into the Kickapoo country. From 1845 until 1850 he was engaged in government work and on county surveys in Iowa. During the latter year he made a journey to the Rocky Mountains, and afterward was connected with a banking firm in Davenport, Iowa. He published several accounts of his experiences, including Barrows's New Map of Iowa, with Notes (1854), and Historical Sketch of Scott County (1859). Willard Barrows died on January 3, 1868, in Davenport, Iowa.
