= Joseph S. McHarg House =

Historic house in Iowa, United States

- U.S. National Register of Historic Places
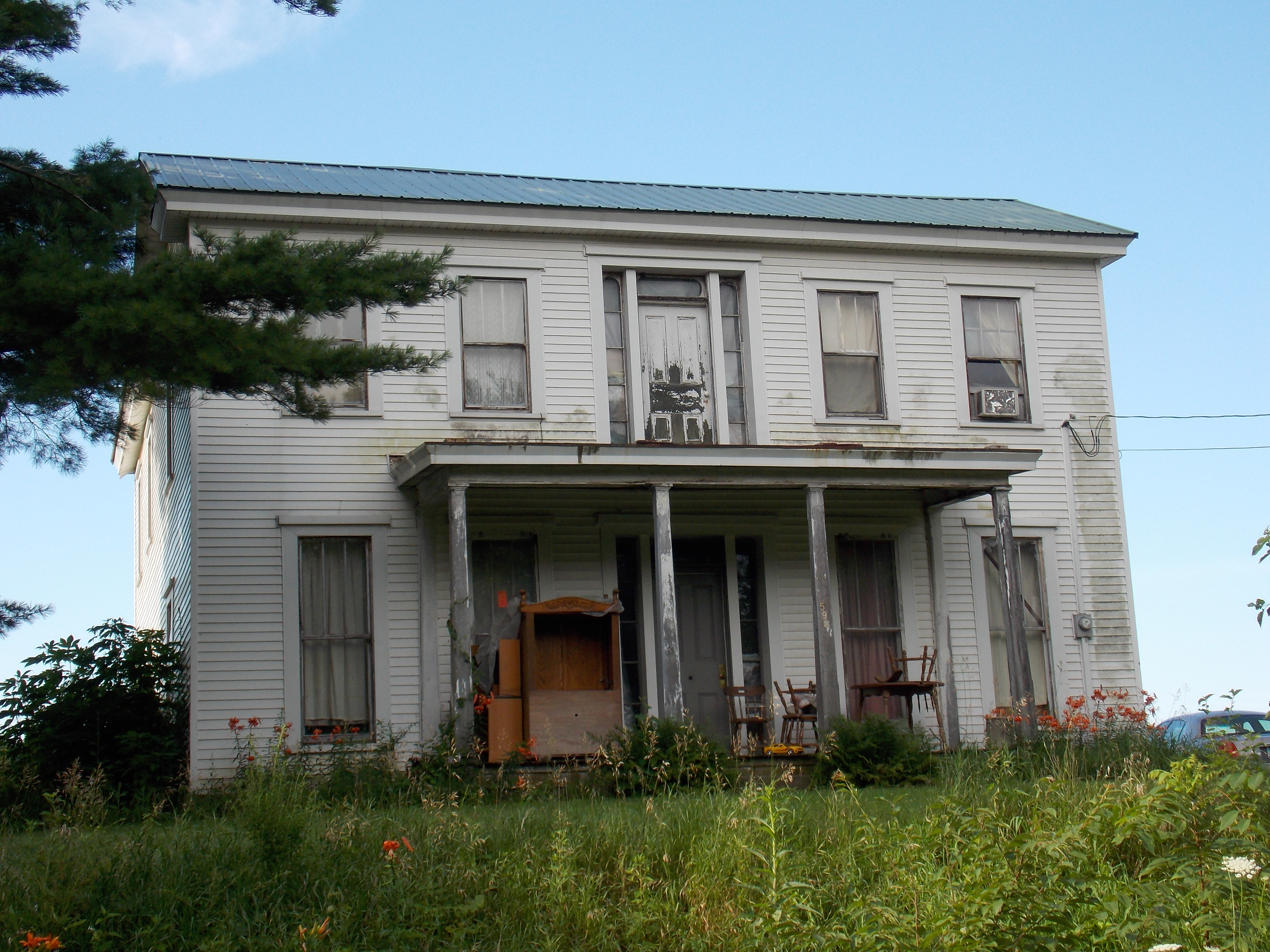

- Location within Iowa Location within the United States
- Location: 5905 Chapel Hill Rd. Davenport, Iowa
- Coordinates: 41°29′26″N 90°39′37″W
- Area: 1 acre (0.40 ha)
- Built: 1870
- Built by: Joseph McHarg
- Architectural style: Greek Revival
- MPS: Davenport MRA
- NRHP reference No.: 85000775
- Added to NRHP: April 5, 1985

The Joseph S. McHarg House is a historic building located in the West End of Davenport, Iowa, United States. It has been listed on the National Register of Historic Places since 1985.

== History ==
The house is believed to have been built by Joseph McHarg. A native of Ireland, he immigrated to the Davenport area and joined his brother Thomas in farming. In 1855, the two acquired their own farms. By 1882 the property was owned by Richard Jenkins, who ran a farm that grew fruit, probably apples. Heinrich Rohwer acquired the property sometime between 1882 and 1894. His father was a German immigrant who farmed in Allens Grove Township. The property remained in his family well into the 20th century.

== Architecture ==
This house is a typical example of an I-house, which is generally found in rural settings. Even though this house is within the Davenport city limits, it is located in a rural area in the city's southwest corner. The I-house style combines elements found in the Greek Revival and Italianate styles. The Greek Revival elements are found in the center doorways, both upstairs and on the main level, with their sidelights and transoms. The Italianate elements are found primarily in the taller windows on the main floor.
