= Princeton Township =

Princeton Township may refer to:

- Princeton Township, Dallas County, Arkansas, in Dallas County, Arkansas
- Princeton Township, Bureau County, Illinois
- Princeton Township, White County, Indiana
- Princeton Township, Scott County, Iowa
- Princeton Township, Mille Lacs County, Minnesota
- Princeton Township, New Jersey
