= Blue Grass Township, Scott County, Iowa =

Blue Grass Township
- Township
- Location in Scott County
- Coordinates: 41°33′19″N 090°43′00″W
- Country: United States
- State: Iowa
- County: Scott

Area
  - Total: 32.91 sq mi (85.23 km^{2})
  - Land: 32.63 sq mi (84.52 km^{2})
  - Water: 0.27 sq mi (0.71 km^{2}) 0.83%
- Elevation: 705 ft (215 m)

Population (2000)
  - Total: 3,592
  - Density: 110/sq mi (42.5/km^{2})
- GNIS feature ID: 0467468

Blue Grass Township is a township in Scott County, Iowa, United States. As of the 2000 census, its population was 3,592.

== Geography ==
Blue Grass Township covers an area of 32.91 square miles (85.2 km^{2}) and contains two incorporated settlements: Blue Grass and Walcott. According to the USGS, it contains two cemeteries: Kisenmacher and Walcott.
