= Sherton Heights, Iowa =

Sheraton Heights, Iowa
- Unincorporated community
- Location of Sheraton Heights within the state of Iowa
- Coordinates: 41°35′33″N 90°25′35″W
- Country: United States
- State: Iowa
- County: Scott
- Elevation: 719 ft (219 m)

Population (2010)
  - Total: 187
- Time zone: UTC-6 (CST)
  - Summer (DST): UTC-5 (CDT)
- Area code: 563
- GNIS feature ID: 464927

Sheraton Heights is an unincorporated community located in Scott County, Iowa, United States.
