= Bennett Community School District =

School district in Iowa

Coordinates: 41.740722°N 90.97675°W

Location
- Bennett, Iowa Cedar and Scott counties United States
- Coordinates: 41.740722, -90.97675

District information
- Type: Local school district
- Grades: PK-6
- Superintendent: Lonnie Luepker
- Schools: 1
- Budget: $3,249,000 (2020-21)
- NCES District ID: 1904740

Students and staff
- Students: 86 (2022-23)
- Teachers: 11.27 FTE
- Staff: 12.93 FTE
- Student–teacher ratio: 7.63
- District mascot: Bombers
- Colors: Red and Black

Other information
- Website: www.bennett.k12.ia.us

The Bennett Community School District is a rural public school district headquartered in Bennett, Iowa. The district spans eastern Louisa County and western Scott County, and serves the towns of Bennett and New Liberty, and the surrounding rural areas.

Lonnie Luepker, superintendent of Calamus–Wheatland, has served as superintendent through a sharing agreement since 2019.

== Schools ==
The district operates a single K-12 school in Bennett.
