= Lincoln Township, Scott County, Iowa =

Lincoln Township
- Township
- Location in Scott County
- Coordinates: 41°38′43″N 090°30′01″W
- Country: United States
- State: Iowa
- County: Scott

Area
  - Total: 26.61 sq mi (68.93 km^{2})
  - Land: 26.61 sq mi (68.93 km^{2})
  - Water: 0 sq mi (0 km^{2}) 0%
- Elevation: 781 ft (238 m)

Population (2000)
  - Total: 634
  - Density: 24/sq mi (9.2/km^{2})
- GNIS feature ID: 0468268

Lincoln Township is a township in Scott County, Iowa, USA. As of the 2000 census, its population was 634.

== Geography ==
Lincoln Township covers an area of 26.61 square miles (68.9 km^{2}) and contains no incorporated settlements. According to the USGS, it contains two cemeteries: Kay Family and Miller.
