= Winfield Township, Scott County, Iowa =

Winfield Township
- Township
- Location in Scott County
- Coordinates: 41°43′20″N 090°36′07″W
- Country: United States
- State: Iowa
- County: Scott

Area
  - Total: 32.78 sq mi (84.89 km^{2})
  - Land: 32.76 sq mi (84.85 km^{2})
  - Water: 0.015 sq mi (0.04 km^{2}) 0.05%
- Elevation: 709 ft (216 m)

Population (2000)
  - Total: 1,479
  - Density: 45/sq mi (17.4/km^{2})
- GNIS feature ID: 0469010

Winfield Township is a township in Scott County, Iowa, USA. As of the 2000 census, its population was 1,479.

== Geography ==
Winfield Township covers an area of 32.78 square miles (84.9 km^{2}) and contains one incorporated settlement, Long Grove. According to the USGS, it contains two cemeteries: Long Grove Christian Church and Saint Anns Catholic.

The stream of Mason Creek runs through this township.
