= Iowa 80 =

Truck stop in Walcott, Iowa, U.S.

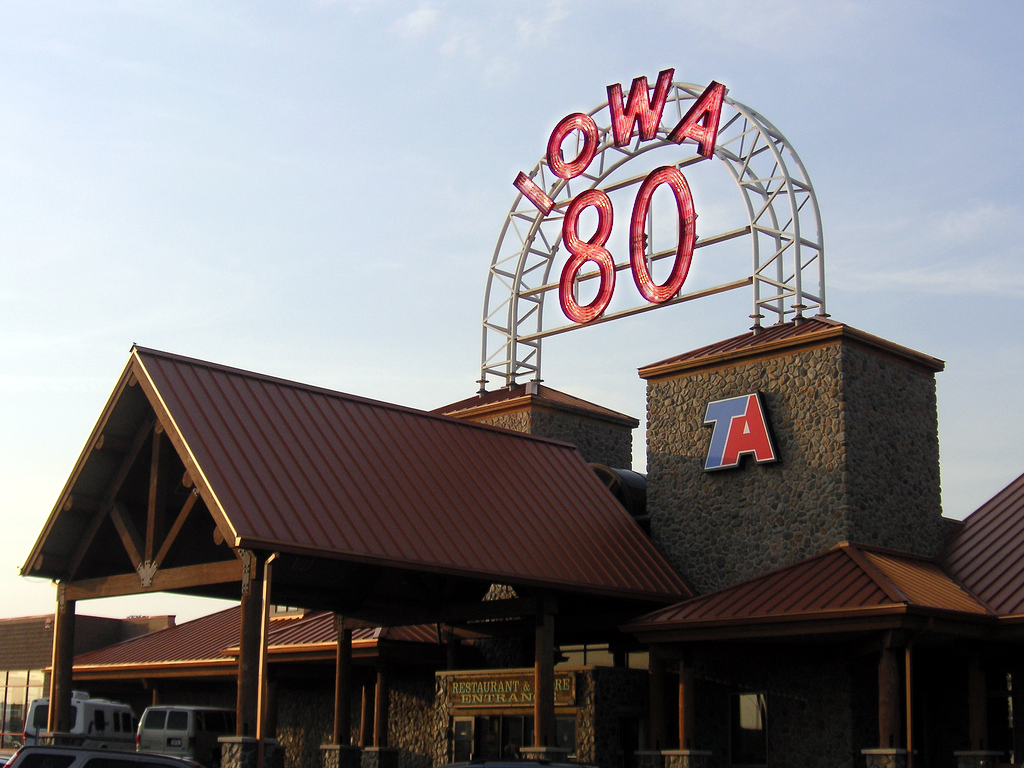
- Iowa 80 Truckstop exterior, 2007
- Interactive map of the Iowa 80 area

General information
- Type: Truck stop
- Location: Walcott, Iowa, United States, 755 W. Iowa 80 Rd, Walcott, Iowa 52773
- Coordinates: 41.6180°N 90.7813°W
- Opening: 1964
- Owner: Iowa 80 Group, Inc.

Dimensions
- Other dimensions: 900 parking spots, 15 fuel lanes

Technical details
- Floor area: 225,000 sq ft (20,900 m^{2})

Design and construction
- Known for: World's largest truck stop

Other information
- Facilities: Restaurants, convenience store, trucking museum, service center, barber shop, dentist, movie theater, laundromat, gift shop, truck wash, CAT scale

Website
- iowa80truckstop.com

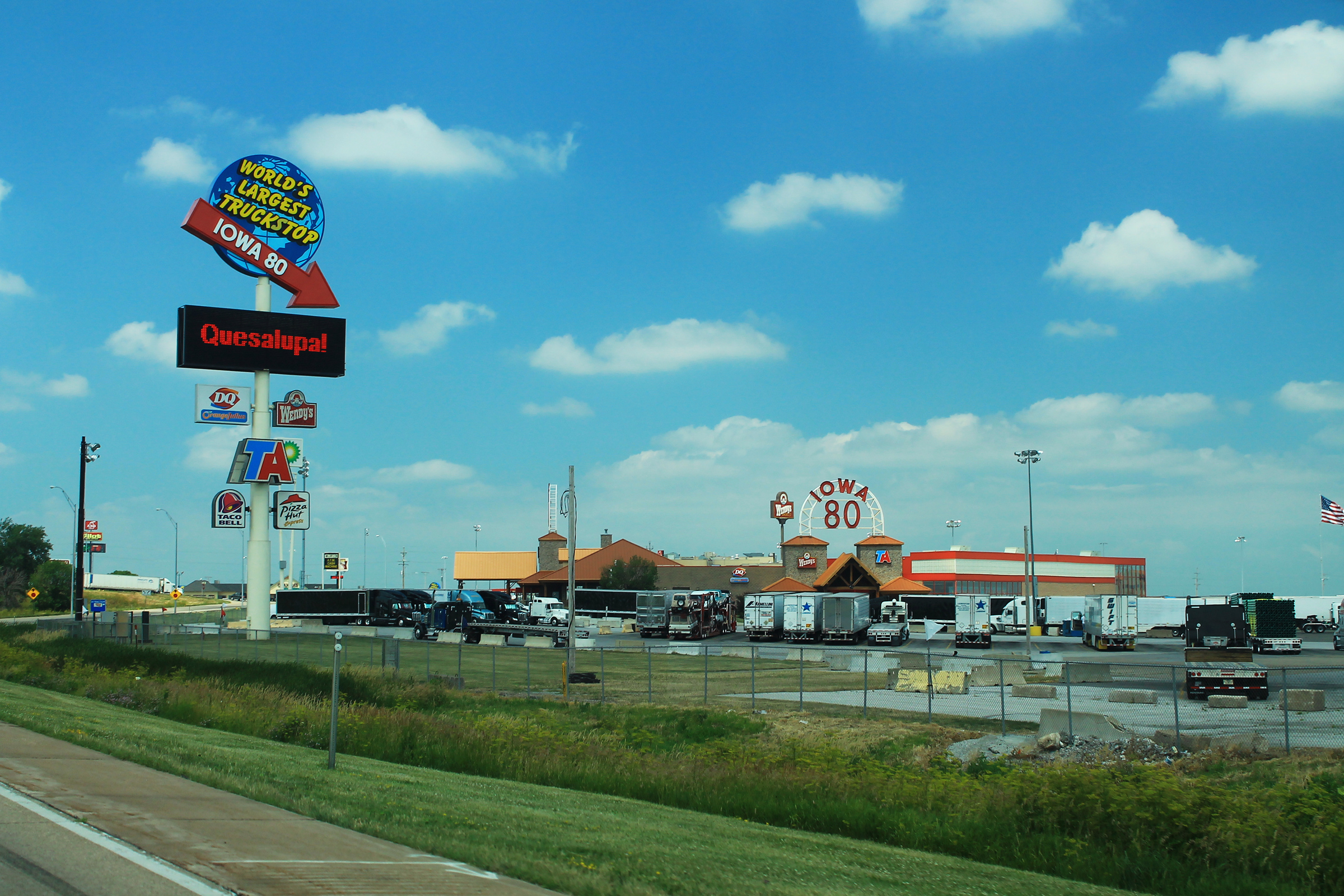
Iowa 80 in 2016

Iowa 80 is the world's largest truck stop, located along Interstate 80 (I-80) off exit 284 in Walcott, Iowa. It sits on a 220-acre (89 ha) plot of land, three times larger than an average 75-acre (30 ha) truck stop, and it receives 5,000 visitors daily. Iowa 80 features a 67,000 sq ft (6,200 m^{2}) main building, parking for 900 trucks, 15 diesel fuel pumps, and also has a dedicated pump for dispensing bulk diesel exhaust fluid. Four-hundred and fifty employees staff the megaplex. The stop offers numerous amenities for truckers and tourists, including a buffet, a food court, a movie theater, a dentist, a chiropractor, a church, and a museum dedicated to trucking.

Iowa 80 is currently affiliated with the TravelCenters of America chain.

== History ==
Bill Moon, a regional manager for Standard Oil, purchased the land and built the original truck stop in 1964 along the emerging I-80, the 3,000-mile (4,700 km) highway that would directly connect San Francisco with New York. "As they were building I-80, my father was responsible for finding land and building truck stops for Standard," says his daughter Delia Meier. Initially a small white enamel building surrounded by cornfields, it housed a modest truckers' store, one lube bay and a restaurant. Bill Moon took direct control in September 1965 and eventually purchased the site from the corporation in 1984. In 1992, the year of Moon's death, it became a TravelCenters of America franchise, though the facility is still owned and operated by the Moon family. In addition, the Iowa 80 Group also owns the Joplin Petro on I-44, and Kenly 95 off of I-95.

In January 2025, Iowa 80 Group agreed to pay a $390,784 fine to the United States Environmental Protection Agency for alleged violations of the federal Clean Water Act. The fine is the result of Iowa 80 and Joplin 44 failing to adequately develop and implement plans that would prevent and control spills as required for facilities that store 1,320 US gallons (5,000 L) or greater of oil products in above-ground storage tanks.

== Facilities ==
=== Exterior ===
Iowa 80 has a large truck parking lot, truck scales, and fueling stations as it is customary for a truck stop. There are fifteen fuel stations. The stations have nozzles on each side, so tanks on both sides of the truck can be filled simultaneously. Since the introduction of trucks requiring diesel exhaust fluid, the fuel island at Iowa 80 has been renovated to include pumps for bulk DEF dispensing. Iowa 80 has a service center where vehicle diagnostics, minor repairs, oil changes or tire rotations can be done. A small convenience store is located on the fuel island. Iowa 80 also has a truck washing facility, and even the engine can be washed. Iowa 80 also has Tesla Superchargers and ChargePoint stations for electric vehicle charging.

==== CAT scales ====
CAT (Certified Automated Truck) scale was founded by Iowa 80 owner Bill Moon. With over 2,000 locations in the United States and Canada, CAT is now touted as the largest scale company network in the world. An app (weigh my truck) allows those weighing to not only get the information on a device in their vehicle but also pay for it.

=== Interior ===
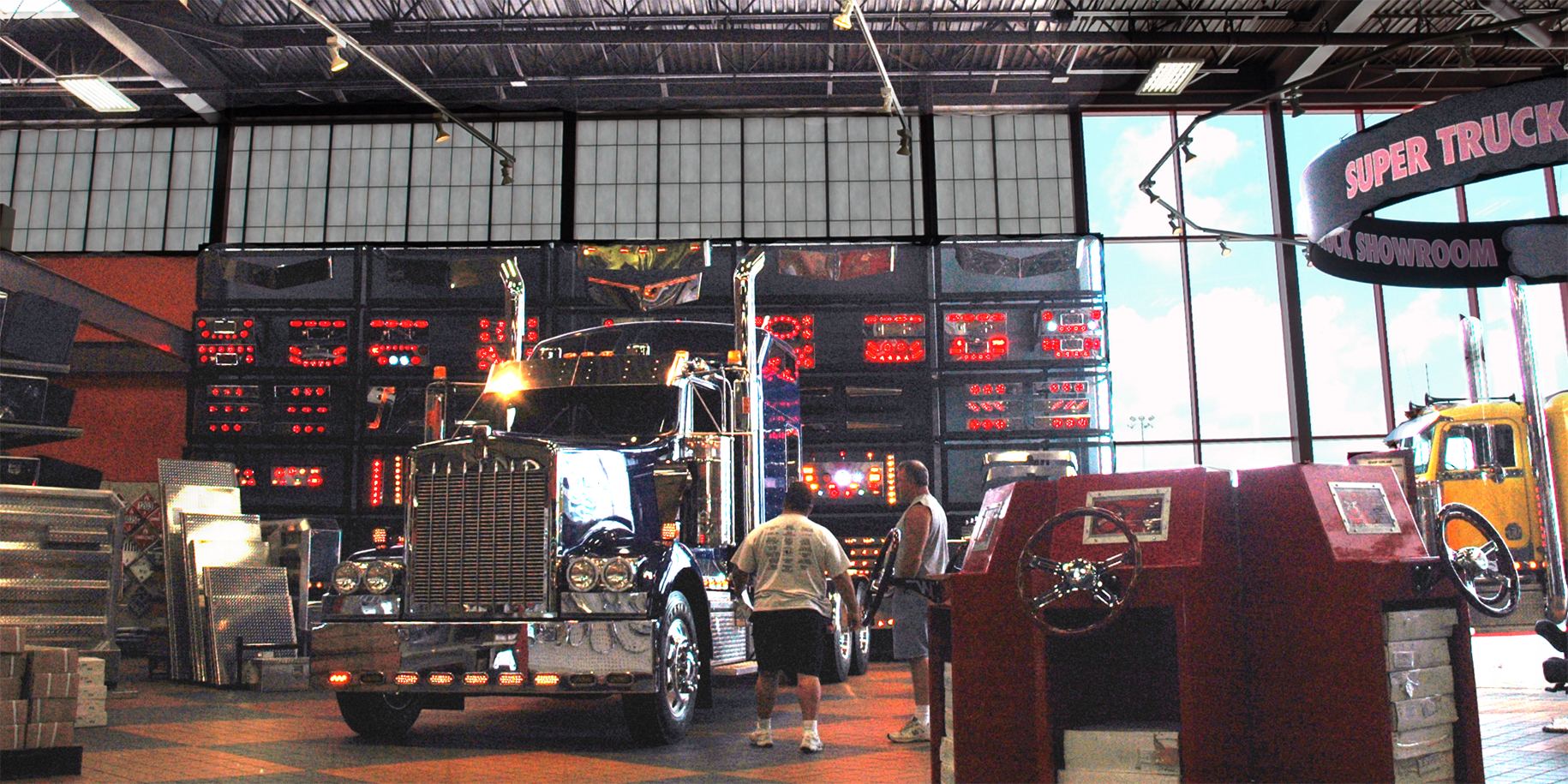
The showroom floor, featuring tricked-out 'show tractors' and a wall of lights.

==== Trucker's Warehouse Store ====
The Iowa 80 facility also has a two-story, 30,000 sq ft (2,800 m^{2}) showroom, which is the largest trucker's store in the country. Here customers may purchase chrome accessories, books, DVDs, CDs, cell phone accessories, CB radio equipment, apparel and cleaners, chrome stacks, and bumpers. There are custom built show trucks, one on a rotating platform. A 20-by-40-foot (6.1 m × 12.2 m) wall displays 500 illuminated truck lights. Also located in the store are a vinyl graphics shop, a custom T-shirt shop, and an embroidery center.

==== Food services ====
A number of food services are located at the stop. These include Blimpie, Wendy's, Caribou Coffee, Dairy Queen, Orange Julius, Taco Bell, Einstein Bros. Bagels, and Pizza Hut. The Iowa 80 Kitchen has an extensive salad bar and provides 'home-cooked' meals. The Iowa 80 Kitchen serves 1 million cups of coffee and 90 tons of meat annually. The restaurant seats 350 patrons, and a banquet room expands the total capacity by 60. The stop does not serve alcohol to discourage drunk driving.

==== Iowa 80 Trucking Museum ====
Opened in 2000, the Iowa 80 Trucking Museum showcases a collection of over 100 antique trucks, 304 pieces of petroliana and 24 gas pumps, many collected by the stop's founder, Bill Moon. The museum does not charge admission.

==== Other facilities ====
There are twenty-four private shower and toilet rooms (which may be requested at the fuel pump), a game room, and a Driver's Den Lounge. The lounge provides leather chairs and a fireplace for relaxing. Iowa 80 also features a business center with fax machines, logbooks & trip report forms and working stations, along with a small free gym. A 60-seat movie theater and an on-site barbershop are available.

Facilities also include a dentist's office and a chiropractic clinic. The dentist usually arrives at around 9am; some of his patrons are local residents rather than truckers. In the Modern Marvels episode "Truck Stops" on the History Channel, the dentist states that he is sometimes the "truckers best friend" because he is providing treatment that is usually aimed at "taking them (the drivers) out of pain". According to the dentist interviewed for the episode, the dentist office in Iowa 80 is very beneficial because it provides a service to patients that might not otherwise get to visit a dentist due to the nomadic lifestyle that over-the-road truck drivers lead. The dentist's office in Iowa 80 accepts both private pay and most all of the major dental insurance plans offered to drivers by companies, making its services accessible to a much wider range of clients.

Across the hall from the dentist is a recently added chiropractic clinic. Services include chiropractic adjustments and Department of Transportation physicals.

== Gallery ==
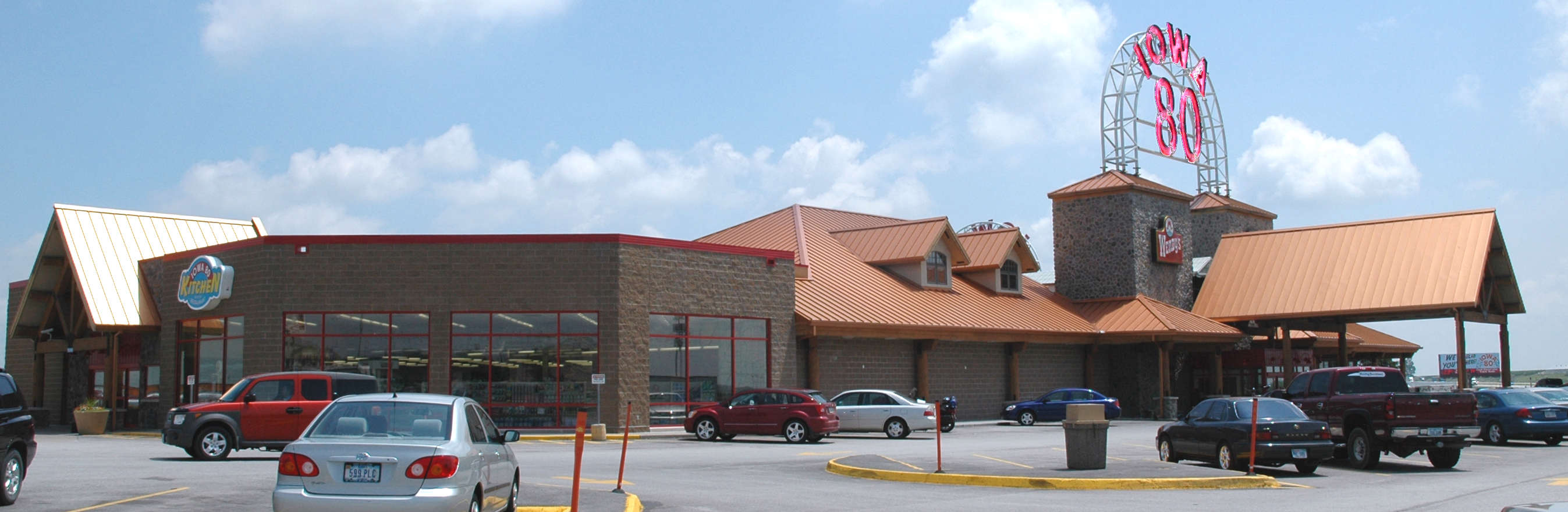
A wide shot of the exterior captures the scope of the building's size.

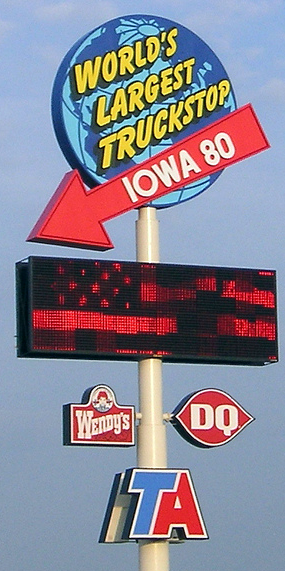
The exit-ramp sign boasts this is the "World's Largest Truckstop".
