= Sheridan Township, Scott County, Iowa =

Sheridan Township
- Township
- Location in Scott County
- Coordinates: 41°39′08″N 090°36′27″W
- Country: United States
- State: Iowa
- County: Scott

Area
  - Total: 30.24 sq mi (78.31 km^{2})
  - Land: 30.24 sq mi (78.31 km^{2})
  - Water: 0 sq mi (0 km^{2}) 0%
- Elevation: 781 ft (238 m)

Population (2000)
  - Total: 4,646
  - Density: 154/sq mi (59.3/km^{2})
- GNIS feature ID: 0468694

Sheridan Township is a township in Scott County, Iowa, USA. As of the 2000 census, its population was 4,646.

== Geography ==
Sheridan Township covers an area of 30.24 square miles (78.3 km^{2}) and contains one incorporated settlement, Eldridge. According to the USGS, it contains one cemetery, Eldridge.
