= Hickory Grove Township, Scott County, Iowa =

Hickory Grove Township
- Township
- Location in Scott County
- Coordinates: 41°38′40″N 090°43′41″W
- Country: United States
- State: Iowa
- County: Scott

Area
  - Total: 35.38 sq mi (91.64 km^{2})
  - Land: 35.38 sq mi (91.64 km^{2})
  - Water: 0 sq mi (0 km^{2}) 0%
- Elevation: 705 ft (215 m)

Population (2000)
  - Total: 671
  - Density: 19/sq mi (7.3/km^{2})
- GNIS feature ID: 0468032

Hickory Grove Township is a township in Scott County, Iowa, USA. As of the 2000 census, its population was 671.

== Geography ==
Hickory Grove Township covers an area of 35.38 square miles (91.6 km^{2}) and contains one incorporated settlement, Maysville. According to the USGS, it contains four cemeteries: Burch, Linn Grove, Maysville and O'Toole.

== Transportation ==
Hickory Grove Township had one grass landing strip, Stender Airport, at 24417 80th Ave, Walcott, IA. It was operated by Otto Stender from 1968 until he died in 2011.

== Attractions ==
Hickory Grove Township is home to the World's Largest Truck Stop, Iowa 80.
