= Cleona Township, Scott County, Iowa =

Cleona Township
- Township
- Location in Scott County
- Coordinates: 41°38′07″N 090°50′05″W
- Country: United States
- State: Iowa
- County: Scott

Area
  - Total: 36.34 sq mi (94.11 km^{2})
  - Land: 36.34 sq mi (94.11 km^{2})
  - Water: 0 sq mi (0 km^{2}) 0%
- Elevation: 761 ft (232 m)

Population (2000)
  - Total: 509
  - Density: 14/sq mi (5.4/km^{2})
- GNIS feature ID: 0467621

Cleona Township is a township in Scott County, Iowa, USA. As of the 2000 census, its population was 509.

== Geography ==
Cleona Township covers an area of 36.33 square miles (94.1 km^{2}) and contains no incorporated settlements.

== Transportation ==
Cleona Township contains one airport or landing strip, Workman Airfield.
