= Princeton Township, Scott County, Iowa =

Princeton Township
- Township
- Location in Scott County
- Coordinates: 41°41′39″N 090°23′03″W
- Country: United States
- State: Iowa
- County: Scott

Area
  - Total: 32.93 sq mi (85.29 km^{2})
  - Land: 30.47 sq mi (78.91 km^{2})
  - Water: 2.46 sq mi (6.37 km^{2}) 7.47%
- Elevation: 653 ft (199 m)

Population (2000)
  - Total: 1,466
  - Density: 48/sq mi (18.6/km^{2})
- GNIS feature ID: 0468578

Princeton Township is a township in Scott County, Iowa, USA. As of the 2000 census, its population was 1,466.

== Geography ==
Princeton Township covers an area of 32.93 square miles (85.3 km^{2}) and contains one incorporated settlement, Princeton. According to the USGS, it contains five cemeteries: Fessler, Nowlin, Oak Ridge, Princeton City and Salem.

The streams of Bud Creek, Cordova Slough, Old Channel Lost Creek, South Fork Lost Creek, Wapsipinicon River and Whiskey Run Creek run through this township.
