= Allens Grove Township, Scott County, Iowa =

Allens Grove Township
- Township
- Location in Scott County
- Coordinates: 41°43′22″N 090°43′17″W
- Country: United States
- State: Iowa
- County: Scott

Area
  - Total: 27.75 sq mi (71.86 km^{2})
  - Land: 27.62 sq mi (71.53 km^{2})
  - Water: 0.13 sq mi (0.34 km^{2}) 0.47%
- Elevation: 640 ft (195 m)

Population (2000)
  - Total: 1,017
  - Density: 37/sq mi (14.2/km^{2})
- GNIS feature ID: 0467388

Allens Grove Township is a township in Scott County, Iowa, USA. As of the 2000 census, its population was 1,017.

== Geography ==
Allens Grove Township covers an area of 27.75 square miles (71.9 km^{2}) and contains one incorporated settlement, Donahue. According to the USGS, it contains one cemetery, Allens Grove.

The streams of Hickory Creek and Mud Creek run through this township.
