= Dixon, Iowa =

- City
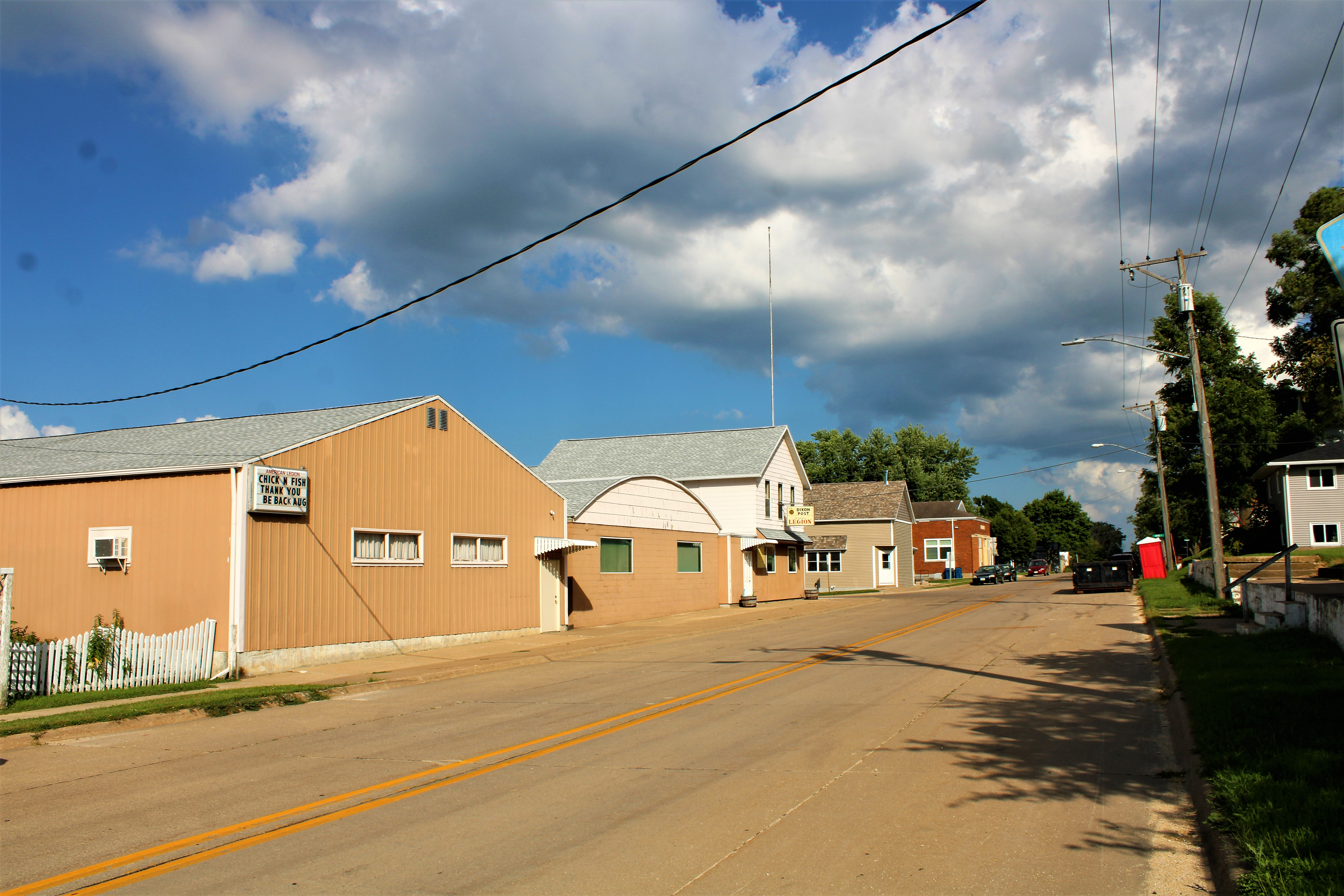
- Street in Dixon

- Location of Dixon, Iowa
- Coordinates: 41°44′32″N 90°46′57″W
- Country: United States
- State: Iowa
- County: Scott

Area
  - City: 0.12 sq mi (0.32 km^{2})
  - Land: 0.12 sq mi (0.32 km^{2})
  - Water: 0 sq mi (0.00 km^{2})
- Elevation: 696 ft (212 m)

Population (2020)
  - City: 202
  - Density: 1,618.6/sq mi (624.96/km^{2})
  - Metro: 382,630 (135th)
- Time zone: UTC-6 (Central (CST))
  - Summer (DST): UTC-5 (CDT)
- ZIP code: 52745
- Area code: 563
- FIPS code: 19-21540
- GNIS feature ID: 2394538
- Website: cityofdixonia.org

Dixon is a city in Scott County, Iowa, United States. The population was 202 at the time of the 2020 census.

== Geography ==
According to the United States Census Bureau, the city has a total area of 0.15 square miles (0.39 km^{2}), all land.

== Demographics ==
Historical populations
Year	Pop.	±%
1880	228	—
1910	198	−13.2%
1920	197	−0.5%
1930	193	−2.0%
1940	226	+17.1%
1950	208	−8.0%
1960	280	+34.6%
1970	276	−1.4%
1980	312	+13.0%
1990	228	−26.9%
2000	276	+21.1%
2010	247	−10.5%
2020	202	−18.2%
Source:"U.S. Census website". United States Census Bureau. and Iowa Data Center; Source: U.S. Decennial Census

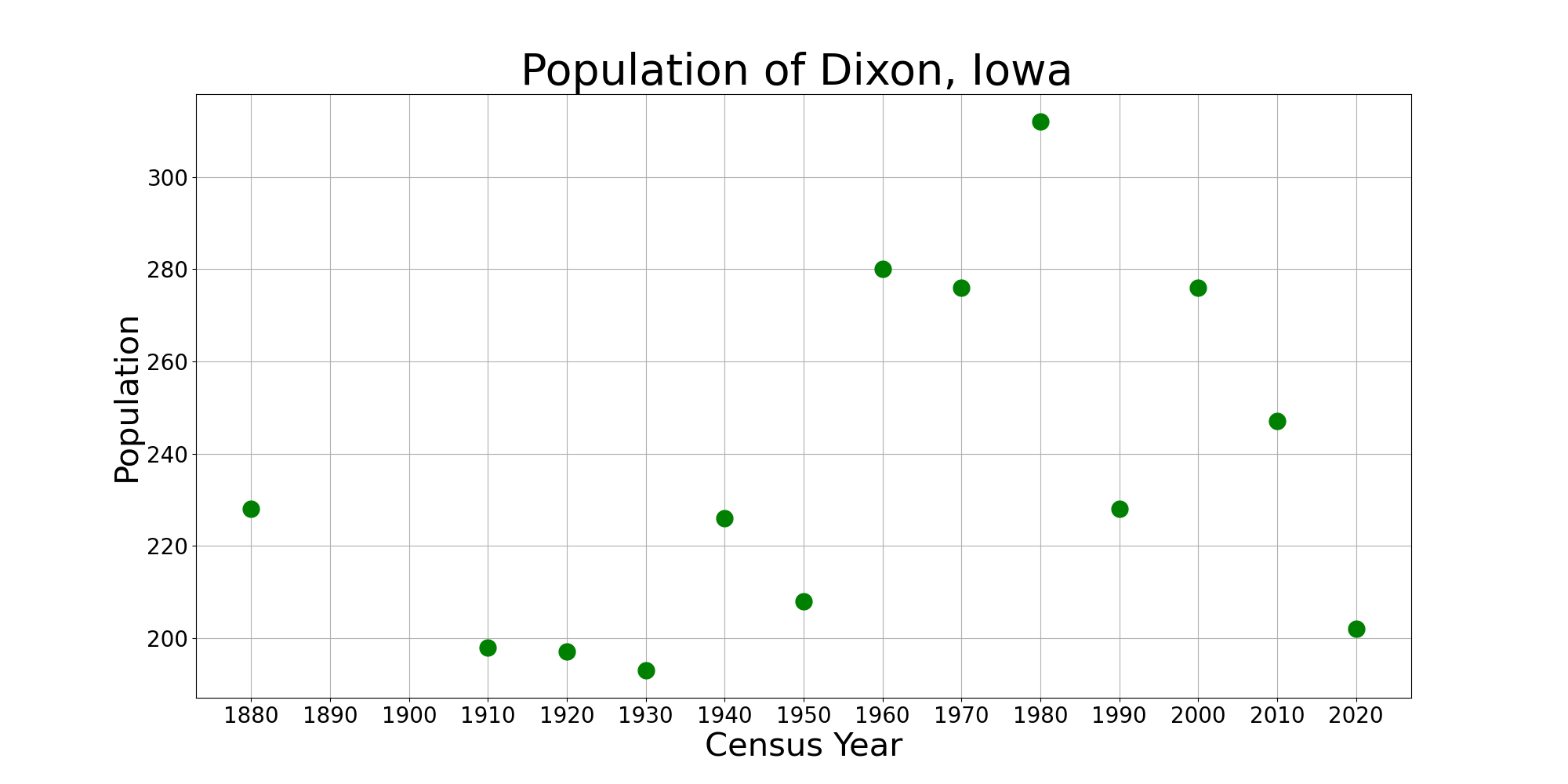
The population of Dixon, Iowa from US census data

=== 2020 census ===
As of the census of 2020, there were 202 people, 87 households, and 48 families residing in the city. The population density was 1,618.6 inhabitants per square mile (625.0/km^{2}). There were 100 housing units at an average density of 801.3 per square mile (309.4/km^{2}). The racial makeup of the city was 87.1% White, 0.0% Black or African American, 0.0% Native American, 0.0% Asian, 0.0% Pacific Islander, 0.0% from other races and 12.9% from two or more races. Hispanic or Latino persons of any race comprised 1.5% of the population.

Of the 87 households, 26.4% of which had children under the age of 18 living with them, 42.5% were married couples living together, 12.6% were cohabitating couples, 17.2% had a female householder with no spouse or partner present and 27.6% had a male householder with no spouse or partner present. 44.8% of all households were non-families. 36.8% of all households were made up of individuals, 14.9% had someone living alone who was 65 years old or older.

The median age in the city was 41.5 years. 25.7% of the residents were under the age of 20; 2.0% were between the ages of 20 and 24; 24.3% were from 25 and 44; 32.2% were from 45 and 64; and 15.8% were 65 years of age or older. The gender makeup of the city was 52.0% male and 48.0% female.

=== 2010 census ===
As of the census of 2010, there were 247 people, 98 households, and 67 families living in the city. The population density was 1,646.7 inhabitants per square mile (635.8/km^{2}). There were 104 housing units at an average density of 693.3 per square mile (267.7/km^{2}). The racial makeup of the city was 96.8% White, 1.2% African American, 0.8% Native American, and 1.2% from two or more races. Hispanic or Latino of any race were 0.4% of the population.

There were 98 households, of which 31.6% had children under the age of 18 living with them, 53.1% were married couples living together, 5.1% had a female householder with no husband present, 10.2% had a male householder with no wife present, and 31.6% were non-families. 21.4% of all households were made up of individuals, and 6.2% had someone living alone who was 65 years of age or older. The average household size was 2.52 and the average family size was 2.90.

The median age in the city was 36.9 years. 26.3% of residents were under the age of 18; 8.2% were between the ages of 18 and 24; 29.6% were from 25 to 44; 23.4% were from 45 to 64; and 12.6% were 65 years of age or older. The gender makeup of the city was 53.0% male and 47.0% female.

=== 2000 census ===
As of the census of 2000, there were 276 people, 105 households, and 74 families living in the city. The population density was 1,881.7 inhabitants per square mile (726.5/km^{2}). There were 108 housing units at an average density of 736.3 per square mile (284.3/km^{2}). The racial makeup of the city was 98.19% White, 1.45% African American, and 0.36% from two or more races.

There were 105 households, out of which 41.9% had children under the age of 18 living with them, 59.0% were married couples living together, 7.6% had a female householder with no husband present, and 29.5% were non-families. 25.7% of all households were made up of individuals, and 8.6% had someone living alone who was 65 years of age or older. The average household size was 2.63 and the average family size was 3.12.

31.5% are under the age of 18, 7.6% from 18 to 24, 31.2% from 25 to 44, 19.9% from 45 to 64, and 9.8% who were 65 years of age or older. The median age was 33 years. For every 100 females, there were 95.7 males. For every 100 females age 18 and over, there were 98.9 males.

The median income for a household in the city was $37,292, and the median income for a family was $42,188. Males had a median income of $27,500 versus $21,875 for females. The per capita income for the city was $14,826. About 4.3% of families and 5.1% of the population were below the poverty line, including 3.6% of those under the age of eighteen and 3.0% of those 65 or over.

== Education ==
Dixon is part of the North Scott Community School District, which spans 220 square miles (570 km^{2}) in northern Scott County.
