= New Liberty, Iowa =

- City
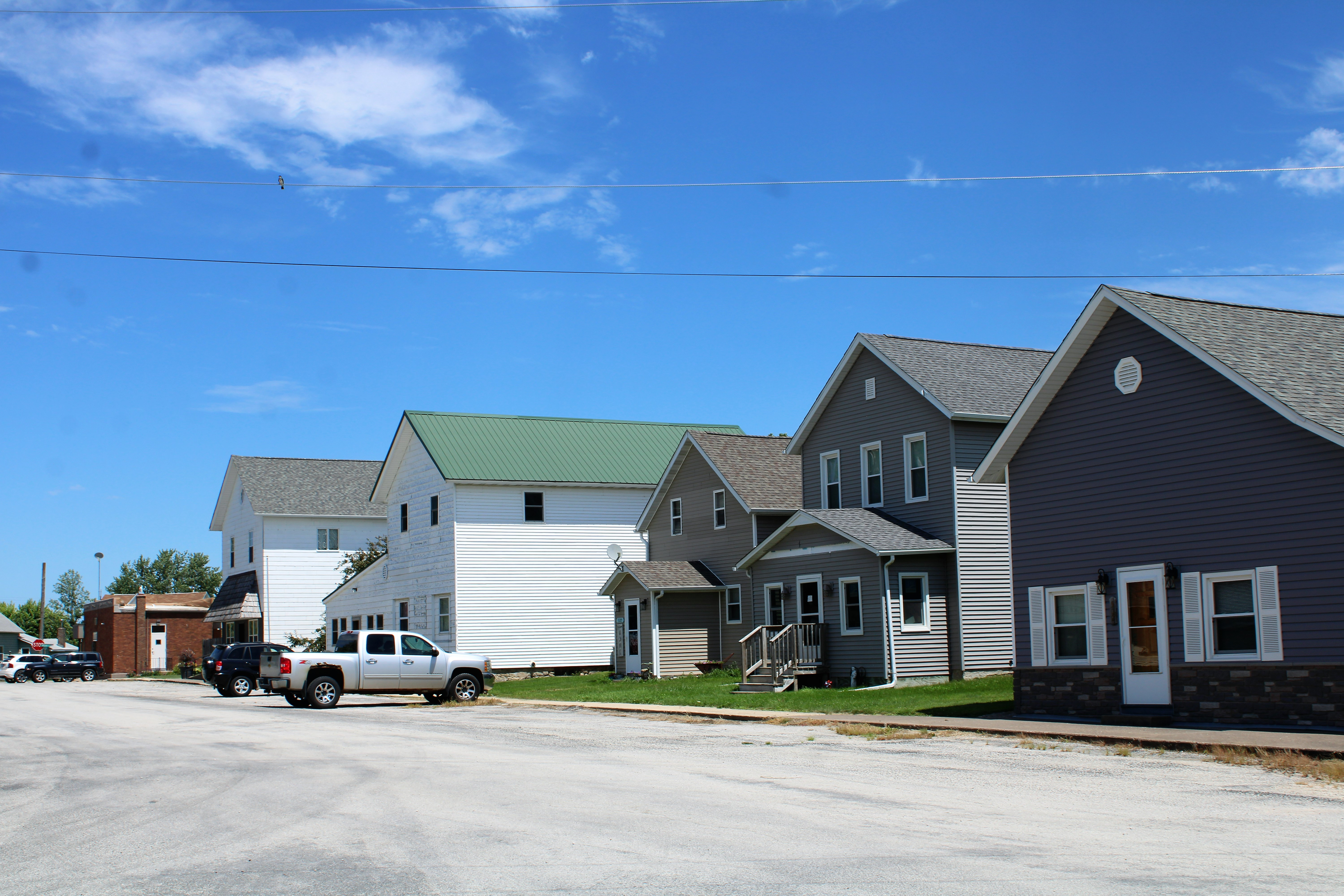
- Downtown New Liberty

- Location of New Liberty, Iowa
- Coordinates: 41°42′54″N 90°52′36″W
- Country: United States
- State: Iowa
- County: Scott

Area
  - Total: 0.089 sq mi (0.23 km^{2})
  - Land: 0.089 sq mi (0.23 km^{2})
  - Water: 0 sq mi (0.00 km^{2})
- Elevation: 797 ft (243 m)

Population (2020)
  - Total: 138
  - Density: 1,534.5/sq mi (592.46/km^{2})
- Time zone: UTC-6 (Central (CST))
  - Summer (DST): UTC-5 (CDT)
- ZIP code: 52765
- Area code: 563
- FIPS code: 19-56280
- GNIS feature ID: 2395202

New Liberty is a city in Scott County, Iowa, United States. The population was 138 at the time of the 2020 census.

== Geography ==
According to the United States Census Bureau, the city has a total area of 0.10 square miles (0.26 km^{2}), all land.

== Education ==
Elementary school-aged children living in the city attend school at Bennett Community School District, with junior high and high school students attending Durant High School; the arrangement is part of a whole-grade sharing agreement between the Durant and Bennett school districts. However, there is an option for the elementary students to go to another local town's high school, Tipton High School.

== Demographics ==
Historical populations
| Year | Pop. | ±% |
|---|---|---|
| 1910 | 93 | — |
| 1920 | 116 | +24.7% |
| 1930 | 103 | −11.2% |
| 1940 | 125 | +21.4% |
| 1950 | 126 | +0.8% |
| 1960 | 145 | +15.1% |
| 1970 | 141 | −2.8% |
| 1980 | 136 | −3.5% |
| 1990 | 139 | +2.2% |
| 2000 | 121 | −12.9% |
| 2010 | 137 | +13.2% |
| 2020 | 138 | +0.7% |
Source:"U.S. Census website". United States Census Bureau. and Iowa Data Center; Source: U.S. Decennial Census

=== 2020 census ===
As of the census of 2020, there were 138 people, 60 households, and 44 families residing in the city. The population density was 1,534.5 inhabitants per square mile (592.5/km^{2}). There were 60 housing units at an average density of 667.2 per square mile (257.6/km^{2}). The racial makeup of the city was 93.5% White, 0.0% Black or African American, 0.0% Native American, 0.0% Asian, 0.0% Pacific Islander, 0.0% from other races and 6.5% from two or more races. Hispanic or Latino persons of any race comprised 5.8% of the population.

Of the 60 households, 48.3% of which had children under the age of 18 living with them, 56.7% were married couples living together, 10.0% were cohabitating couples, 23.3% had a female householder with no spouse or partner present and 10.0% had a male householder with no spouse or partner present. 26.7% of all households were non-families. 15.0% of all households were made up of individuals, 10.0% had someone living alone who was 65 years old or older.

The median age in the city was 40.0 years. 31.2% of the residents were under the age of 20; 2.9% were between the ages of 20 and 24; 21.0% were from 25 and 44; 23.9% were from 45 and 64; and 21.0% were 65 years of age or older. The gender makeup of the city was 54.3% male and 45.7% female.

=== 2010 census ===
As of the census of 2010, there were 137 people, 52 households, and 38 families living in the city. The population density was 1,370.0 inhabitants per square mile (529.0/km^{2}). There were 60 housing units at an average density of 600.0 per square mile (231.7/km^{2}). The racial makeup of the city was 92.7% White, 4.4% African American, and 2.9% from two or more races.

There were 52 households, of which 40.4% had children under the age of 18 living with them, 63.5% were married couples living together, 5.8% had a female householder with no husband present, 3.8% had a male householder with no wife present, and 26.9% were non-families. 26.9% of all households were made up of individuals, and 17.3% had someone living alone who was 65 years of age or older. The average household size was 2.63 and the average family size was 3.16.

The median age in the city was 35.9 years. 32.1% of residents were under the age of 18; 4.4% were between the ages of 18 and 24; 22% were from 25 to 44; 29.2% were from 45 to 64; and 12.4% were 65 years of age or older. The gender makeup of the city was 52.6% male and 47.4% female.

=== 2000 census ===
As of the census of 2000, there were 121 people, 45 households, and 35 families living in the city. The population density was 1,275.5 inhabitants per square mile (492.5/km^{2}). There were 46 housing units at an average density of 484.9 per square mile (187.2/km^{2}). The racial makeup of the city was 100.00% White.

There were 45 households, out of which 42.2% had children under the age of 18 living with them, 57.8% were married couples living together, 8.9% had a female householder with no husband present, and 22.2% were non-families. 20.0% of all households were made up of individuals, and 13.3% had someone living alone who was 65 years of age or older. The average household size was 2.69 and the average family size was 2.86.

30.6% are under the age of 18, 5.8% from 18 to 24, 25.6% from 25 to 44, 23.1% from 45 to 64, and 14.9% who were 65 years of age or older. The median age was 37 years. For every 100 females, there were 116.1 males. For every 100 females age 18 and over, there were 121.1 males.

The median income for a household in the city was $50,625, and the median income for a family was $55,000. Males had a median income of $30,250 versus $20,833 for females. The per capita income for the city was $18,195. There were 14.3% of families and 19.5% of the population living below the poverty line, including 21.4% of under eighteens and 11.1% of those over 64.
