= Walcott, Iowa =

City in Iowa, United States

- City
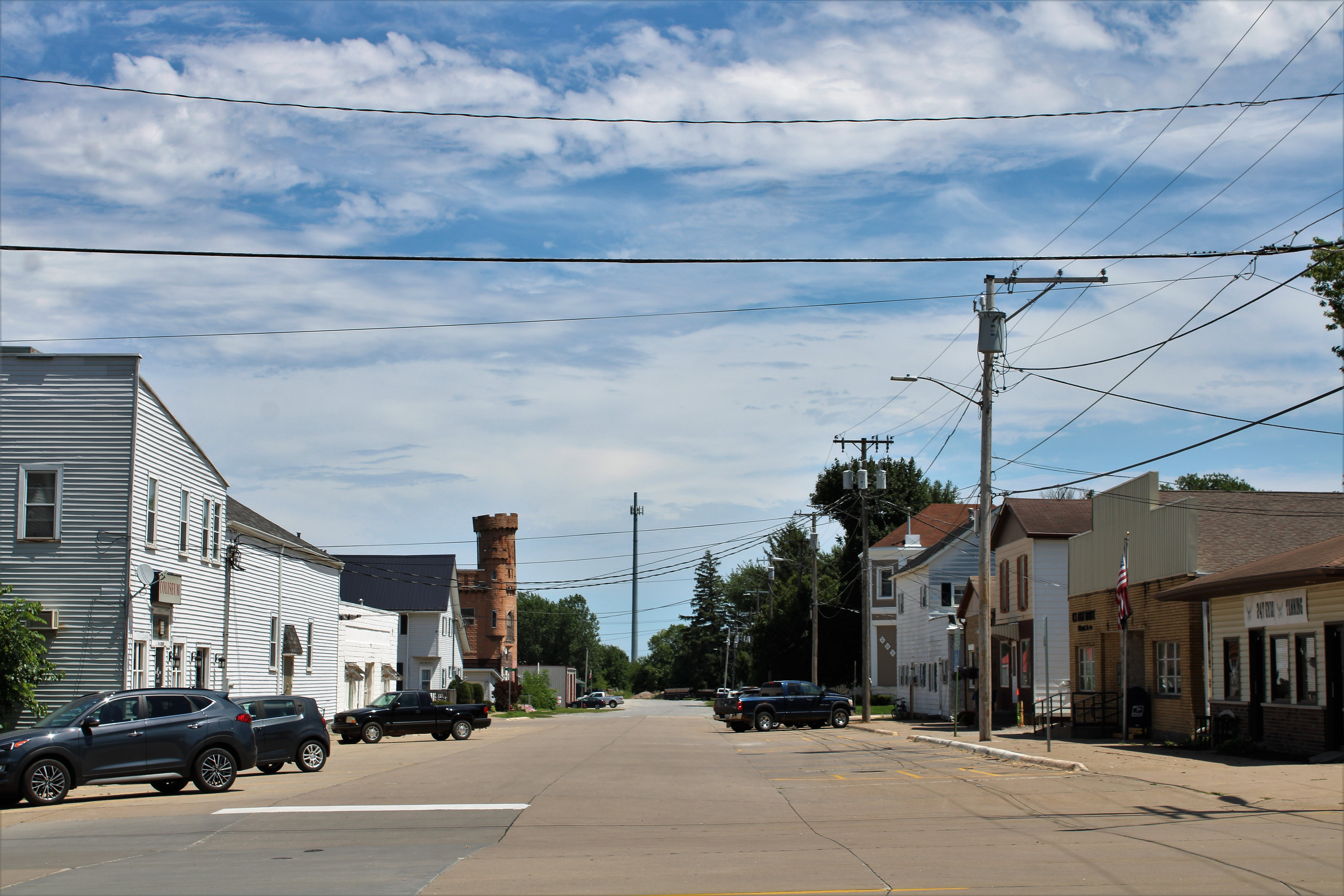
- Buildings along E. Bryant Street

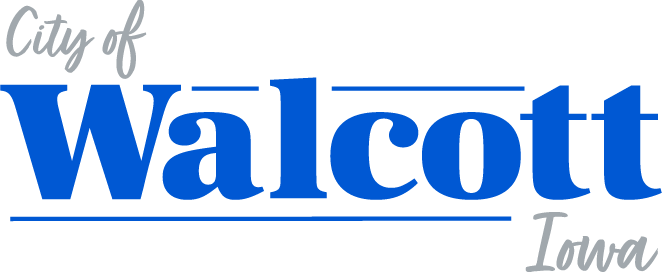
- Wordmark
- Motto: "Heart & Hands Working Together"
- Location of Walcott, Iowa
- Coordinates: 41°36′25″N 90°46′28″W
- Country: United States
- State: Iowa
- Counties: Scott and Muscatine

Government
  - Mayor: Jacob Puck

Area
  - City: 3.14 sq mi (8.12 km^{2})
  - Land: 3.11 sq mi (8.06 km^{2})
  - Water: 0.023 sq mi (0.06 km^{2})
- Elevation: 725 ft (221 m)

Population (2020)
  - City: 1,551
  - Density: 498.5/sq mi (192.47/km^{2})
  - Metro: 382,630 (135th)
- Time zone: UTC-6 (Central (CST))
  - Summer (DST): UTC-5 (CDT)
- ZIP code: 52773
- Area code: 563
- FIPS code: 19-81705
- GNIS feature ID: 2397169
- Website: cityofwalcott.com

Walcott (/ˈwɔlkɔt/ WAWL-cawt, sometimes locally [ˈwɔlkət]) is a city in Muscatine and Scott counties in the U.S. state of Iowa. The population was 1,551 at the time of the 2020 census. Walcott's interchange on Interstate 80 is home to an enormous complex of restaurants, motels and truck stops, including the Iowa 80 truck stop, which is the world's largest.

Most of Walcott is part of the Davenport–Moline–Rock Island, IA-IL Metropolitan Statistical Area, but the Muscatine County portion of the city is considered part of the Muscatine Micropolitan Statistical Area.

== History ==
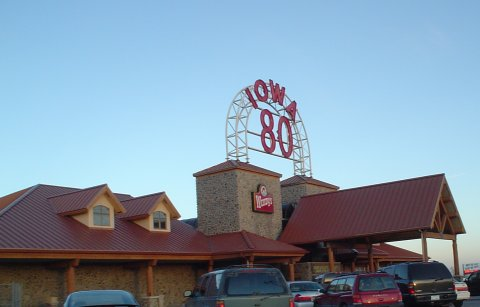
The Iowa 80 Truck Stop main building.

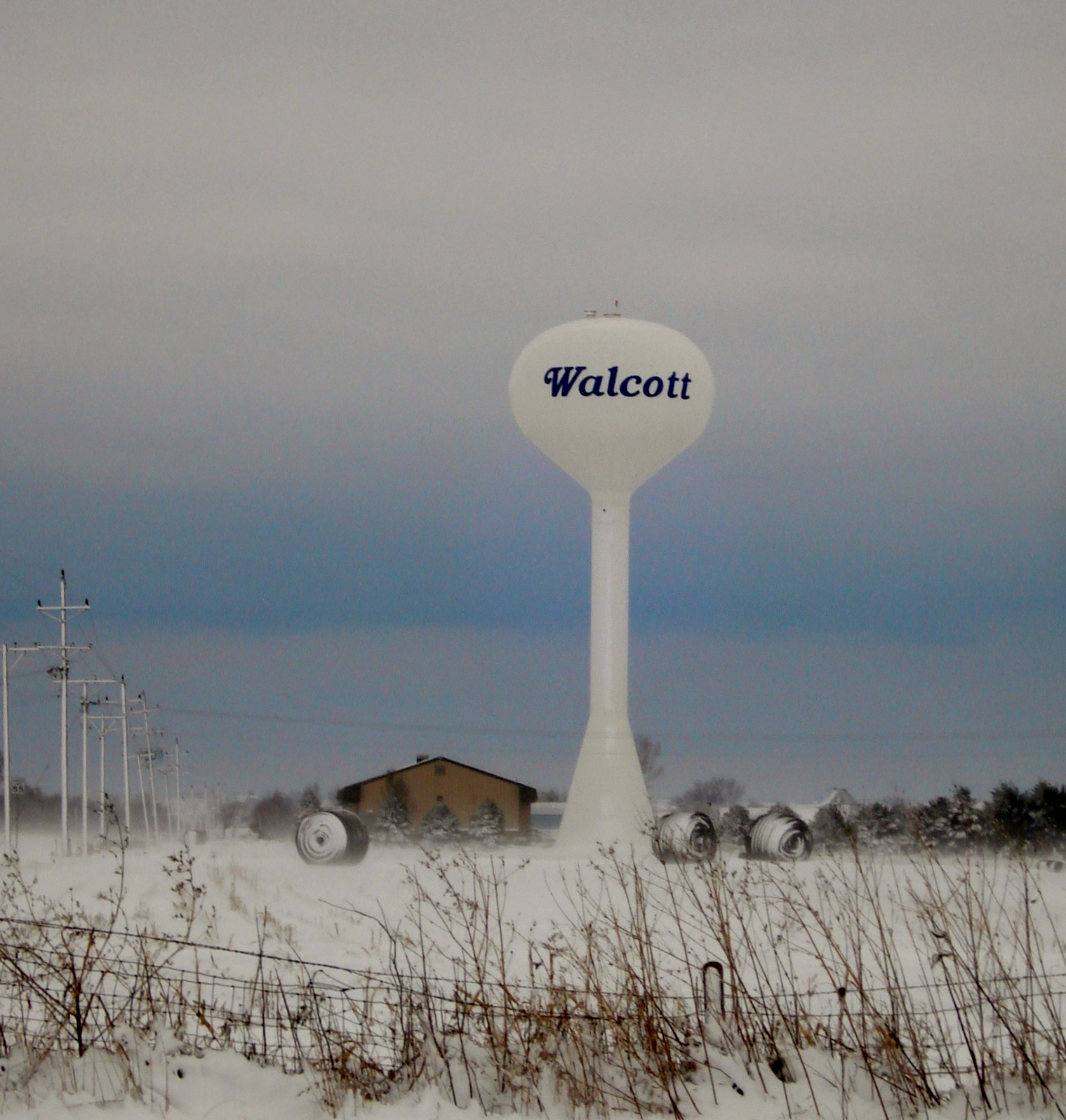
Walcott water tower

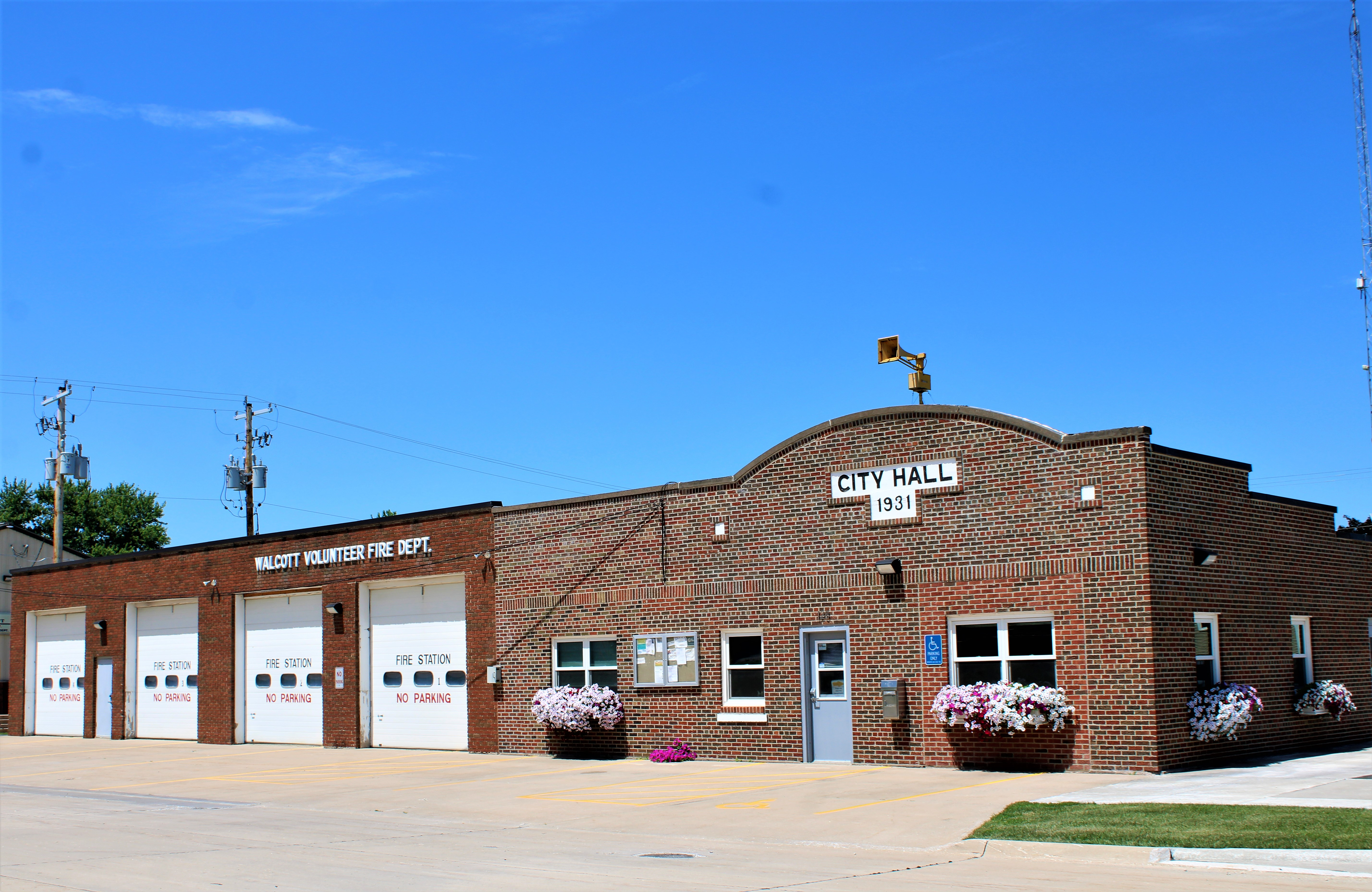
Walcott City Hall

Walcott was incorporated on July 10, 1894.

The City of Walcott was originally platted in 1854. The first passenger train route west of the Mississippi River began service in 1855 and helped Walcott grow. William Walcott, who was a director of Chicago and Rock Island Railroad, donated $500 in 1855 for the construction of a school building, with the stipulation that the fledgling town along the railroad tracks near Davenport be named after him.

Long before Walcott was even a vision to William Walcott, it was a great expanse of open prairie inhabited by the Kaskaskia people. The Kaskaskias were later driven out of the Quad Cities area by the renegade Meskwaki tribe. This tribe, a splinter of the Canadian Iroquois, was America's largest Indian nation.

In 1857, much of the Walcott land was sold for as low as 75 cents an acre, enabling many German and Scotch-Irish immigrants to settle in the area. Many of the Scotch-Irish worked for the railroad builders and settled on the farmland south and west of the town. While they contributed much to the early development of Walcott, circa 1871 they began to move farther west. Most of the German settlers were from Schleswig-Holstein in northern Germany, and some came from eastern and southern Germany. By 1910, nearly 90 percent of the farmland in Scott County was owned by German immigrants or their descendants.

A petition for incorporation was signed and presented to Judge C.M. Waterman of the District Court at Davenport on June 5, 1894. At that time, the total population was 354. The election was held on July 7, 1894, and of the 81 votes cast, 54 were in favor of the incorporation. The result of the election was approved and filed by the District Court on July 14, 1894.

Long before most small towns thought of supplying their citizens with water, Walcott had plans for an efficient and adequate water system. Walcott was the first rural Scott County community to build a water system and water tower. The installation was completed in 1897, and provided the citizens of Walcott with inexpensive water service, good drinking water, and improved fire protection. In 1914, the first sewage disposal system was built. Lagoons for the sanitation system were installed in the late 1960s and three cells were added to the lagoon system in 1975.

As early as 1897, the people of Walcott banded together to provide an organized way of fighting the terror and destructiveness of fire. In those early days, the department consisted of a small number of volunteer firemen and two hand-pulled hose carts. In 1931, the town built a fire station and city hall. Today, that same building houses the Fire Department and City Hall.

The Walcott Savings Bank was organized in 1894 with a capital stock of $30,000. On April 1, 1904, the Farmers Savings Bank began business with at capital stock of $25,000. In 1911, Walcott was declared the richest town in the US in consideration of the bank deposits for its population of 300, according to Dunn & Co. in the Bankers' Journal of New York. During the depression year of 1931, the two banks were consolidated and Walcott Trust and Savings Bank was formed.

The original town was expanded in 1962 to include Highway 6. Additional ground was annexed in 1973 to include the Interstate 80 interchange area and the French and Hecht Building, which currently houses FirstCo Inc. In the early 1990s, quadrants adjacent to and near the Interstate 80 interchanged were also annexed in. The annexation of the area near Interstate 80 has increased the area's valuation significantly. Many businesses, including the world's largest truck stop, Iowa 80 Truck Stop, are located within the city limits.

In 1997, Walcott joined in a sister city partnership with Bredenbek, Germany.

== Geography ==
According to the United States Census Bureau, the city has a total area of 3.49 square miles (9.04 km^{2}), of which 3.47 square miles (8.99 km^{2}) is land and 0.02 square miles (0.05 km^{2}) is water.

== Demographics ==
Historical populations
Year	Pop.	±%
1900	362	—
1910	416	+14.9%
1920	384	−7.7%
1930	398	+3.6%
1940	440	+10.6%
1950	480	+9.1%
1960	664	+38.3%
1970	989	+48.9%
1980	1,425	+44.1%
1990	1,356	−4.8%
2000	1,528	+12.7%
2010	1,629	+6.6%
2020	1,551	−4.8%
Source:"American FactFinder". United States Census Bureau. and Iowa Data Center; Source: U.S. Decennial Census

=== 2020 census ===
As of the 2020 census, Walcott had a population of 1,551. The population density was 498.5 inhabitants per square mile (192.5/km^{2}). The median age was 43.2 years. 22.5% of residents were under the age of 18. For every 100 females there were 91.7 males, and for every 100 females age 18 and over there were 90.8 males age 18 and over.

0.0% of residents lived in urban areas, while 100.0% lived in rural areas.

There were 664 households, including 417 families. Of all households, 30.1% had children under the age of 18 living in them, 47.6% were married-couple households, 19.6% were households with a male householder and no spouse or partner present, and 26.2% were households with a female householder and no spouse or partner present. About 37.2% of households were non-families, 32.9% of all households were made up of individuals, and 15.8% had someone living alone who was 65 years of age or older.

There were 711 housing units at an average density of 228.5 per square mile (88.2/km^{2}), of which 6.6% were vacant. The homeowner vacancy rate was 2.8% and the rental vacancy rate was 7.2%.

In the city's age distribution, 25.2% of residents were under the age of 20, 4.2% were from 20 to 24, 22.6% were from 25 to 44, 26.2% were from 45 to 64, and 21.7% were 65 years of age or older. The gender makeup of the city was 47.8% male and 52.2% female.

Racial composition as of the 2020 census
Race	Number	Percent
White	1,461	94.2%
Black or African American	8	0.5%
American Indian and Alaska Native	1	0.1%
Asian	1	0.1%
Native Hawaiian and Other Pacific Islander	0	0.0%
Some other race	15	1.0%
Two or more races	65	4.2%
Hispanic or Latino (of any race)	43	2.8%

=== 2010 census ===
As of the census of 2010, there were 1,629 people, 694 households, and 456 families living in the city. The population density was 469.5 inhabitants per square mile (181.3/km^{2}). There were 806 housing units at an average density of 232.3 per square mile (89.7/km^{2}). The racial makeup of the city was 97.5% White, 0.2% African American, 0.2% Native American, 0.3% Asian, 0.5% from other races, and 1.2% from two or more races. Hispanic or Latino of any race were 2.5% of the population.

There were 694 households, of which 31.7% had children under the age of 18 living with them, 50.3% were married couples living together, 10.8% had a female householder with no husband present, 4.6% had a male householder with no wife present, and 34.3% were non-families. 29.1% of all households were made up of individuals, and 13.2% had someone living alone who was 65 years of age or older. The average household size was 2.35 and the average family size was 2.86.

The median age in the city was 40.3 years. 24.9% of residents were under the age of 18; 7% were between the ages of 18 and 24; 25.6% were from 25 to 44; 26.7% were from 45 to 64; and 15.8% were 65 years of age or older. The gender makeup of the city was 49.5% male and 50.5% female.

=== 2000 census ===
As of the census of 2000, there were 1,528 people, 623 households, and 437 families living in the city. The population density was 516.2 inhabitants per square mile (199.3/km^{2}). There were 644 housing units at an average density of 217.6 per square mile (84.0/km^{2}). The racial makeup of the city was 97.38% White, 0.33% African American, 0.07% Native American, 0.52% Asian, 0.92% from other races, and 0.79% from two or more races. Hispanic or Latino of any race were 1.11% of the population.

There were 623 households, out of which 33.5% had children under the age of 18 living with them, 56.5% were married couples living together, 10.8% had a female householder with no husband present, and 29.7% were non-families. 26.0% of all households were made up of individuals, and 9.0% had someone living alone who was 65 years of age or older. The average household size was 2.45 and the average family size was 2.94.

26.0% are under the age of 18, 8.7% from 18 to 24, 29.1% from 25 to 44, 23.0% from 45 to 64, and 13.2% who were 65 years of age or older. The median age was 36 years. For every 100 females, there were 95.1 males. For every 100 females age 18 and over, there were 95.8 males.

The median income for a household in the city was $45,281, and the median income for a family was $52,625. Males had a median income of $40,296 versus $22,067 for females. The per capita income for the city was $20,018. About 4.0% of families and 7.0% of the population were below the poverty line, including 7.1% of those under age 18 and 9.2% of those age 65 or over.

== Education ==
Davenport Community School District serves almost all of Walcott. Zoned schools include Walcott Elementary School, Walcott Intermediate School, and Davenport West High School.

== Town twinning ==
- Bredenbek in Germany
