= Scott County, Iowa =

County in Iowa, United States

- County
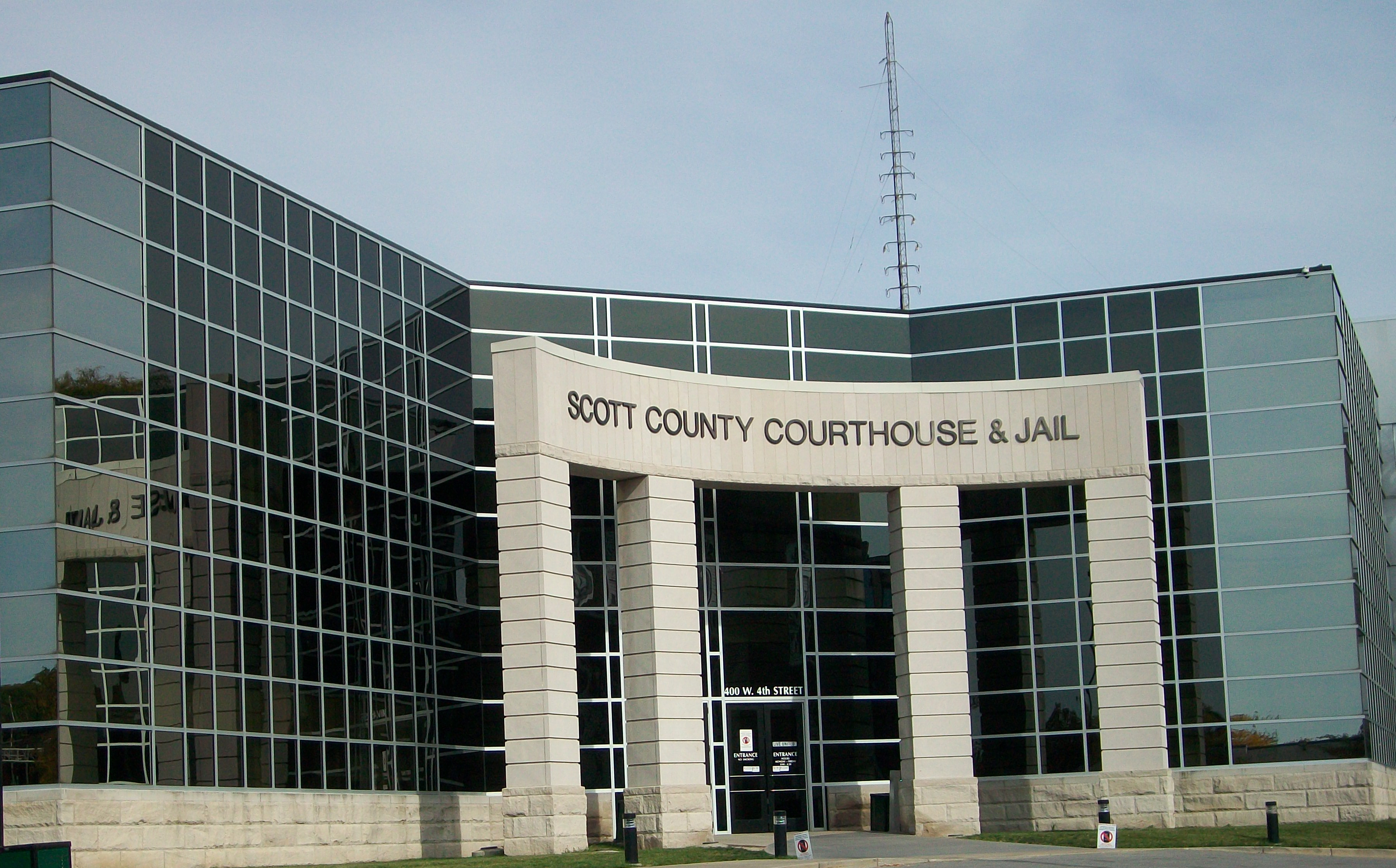
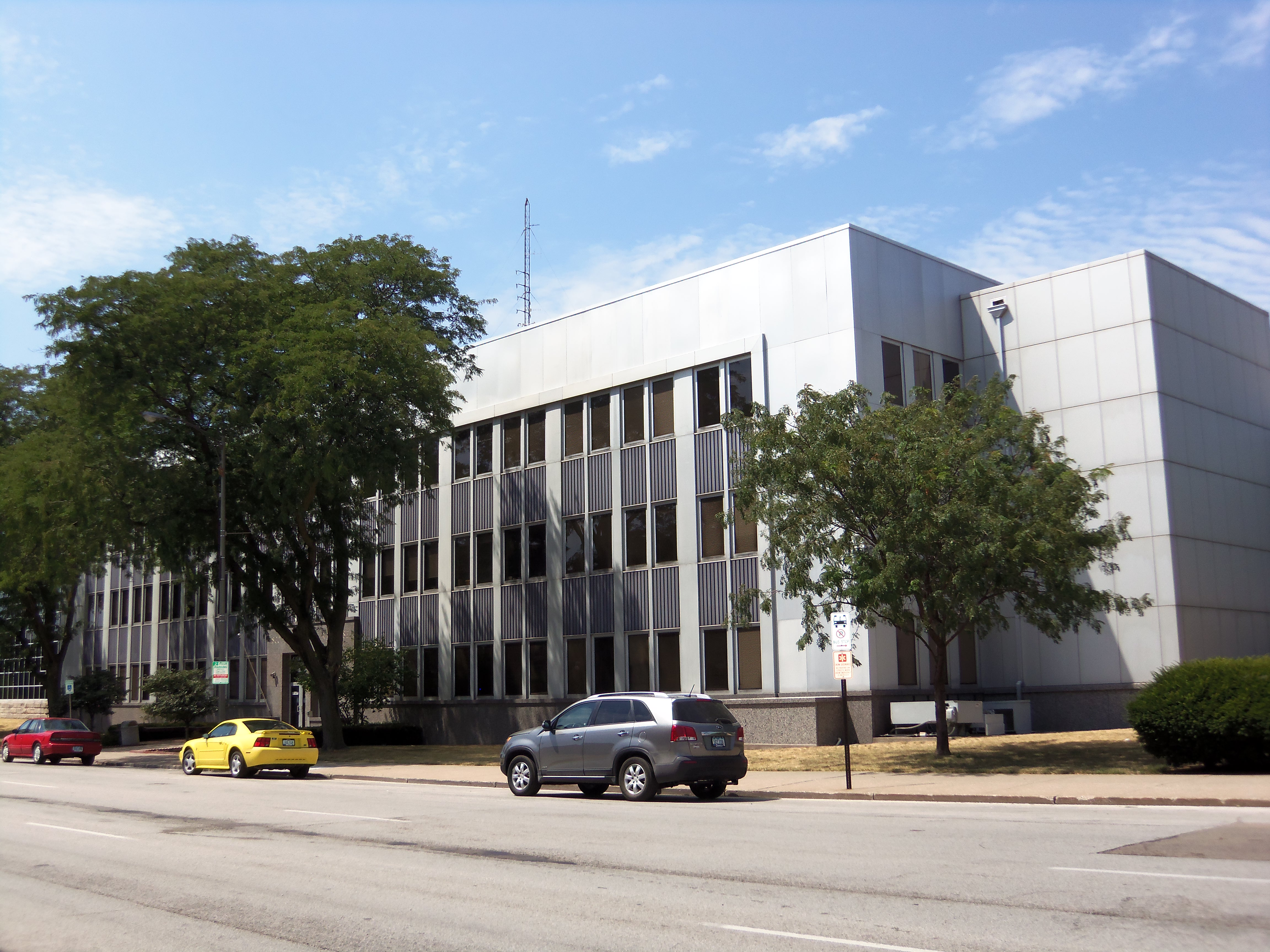
- The newly redesigned courthouse entrance in 2007 The Scott County Courthouse in Davenport in 2012

- Seal

- Location within the U.S. state of Iowa
- Coordinates: 41.642079°N 90.622289°W
- Country: United States
- State: Iowa
- Founded: December 21, 1837
- Named for: Winfield Scott
- Seat: Davenport
- Largest city: Davenport

Area
  - Total: 468.211 sq mi (1,212.66 km^{2})
  - Land: 458.101 sq mi (1,186.48 km^{2})
  - Water: 10.110 sq mi (26.18 km^{2}) 2.16%

Population (2020)
  - Total: 174,669
  - Estimate (2025): 175,259 ▲
  - Density: 381.289/sq mi (147.217/km^{2})
- Time zone: UTC−6 (Central)
  - Summer (DST): UTC−5 (CDT)
- Area code: 563
- Congressional district: 1st
- Website: scottcountyiowa.gov
- Iowa county number 82

Scott County is a county located in the U.S. state of Iowa. As of the 2020 census, the population was 174,669, and was estimated to be 175,259 in 2025, making it the third-most populous county in Iowa. The county seat and largest city is Davenport.

Scott County is included in the Davenport–Moline-Rock Island, IA–IL Metropolitan Statistical Area.

== History ==
Scott County was formed on December 21, 1837.

The first American settlement in the area now known as Scott County was Clark's Ferry or Clark's Landing (now Buffalo) in 1833. Other early towns included Davenport (now the county seat and largest city) and the town of Rockingham (which ceased to exist in 1847). The area was fully surveyed in 1837, and the county was established by the Wisconsin territorial legislature in that same year. Scott County is named for General Winfield Scott, who was the presiding officer at the signing of the peace treaty ending the Black Hawk War.

By 1900 the population of the county was 51,500, and by 1950 it was over 100,000. Scott County now comprises part of the Quad City region, which includes the cities of Davenport and Bettendorf (in Iowa) and Rock Island, Moline and East Moline (in Illinois).

The present Scott County Courthouse was completed in 1955 and expanded along with the jail in 2007. The old section of the Scott County Jail was listed on the National Register of Historic Places in 1983. The courthouse was included as a contributing property in the Davenport Downtown Commercial Historic District in 2020.

== Geography ==
According to the United States Census Bureau, the county has a total area of 468.211 square miles (1,212.66 km^{2}), of which 458.101 square miles (1,186.48 km^{2}) is land and 10.110 square miles (26.18 km^{2}) (2.16%) is water. It is the 77th-largest county in Iowa by total area Part of the Upper Mississippi River National Wildlife and Fish Refuge is located within the county.

=== Major highways ===
- Interstate 74
- Interstate 80
- Interstate 280
- U.S. Highway 6
- U.S. Highway 61
- U.S. Highway 67
- Iowa Highway 22
- Iowa Highway 130

=== Transit ===
- Bettendorf Transit
- Davenport Citibus

=== Adjacent counties ===
- Clinton County (north)
- Rock Island County, Illinois (east and south)
- Muscatine County (southwest)
- Cedar County (northwest)

== Demographics ==
Historical population
| Census | Pop. | Note | %± |
|---|---|---|---|
| 1850 | 5,986 | | — |
| 1860 | 25,959 | | 333.7% |
| 1870 | 38,599 | | 48.7% |
| 1880 | 41,266 | | 6.9% |
| 1890 | 43,164 | | 4.6% |
| 1900 | 51,558 | | 19.4% |
| 1910 | 60,000 | | 16.4% |
| 1920 | 73,952 | | 23.3% |
| 1930 | 77,332 | | 4.6% |
| 1940 | 84,748 | | 9.6% |
| 1950 | 100,698 | | 18.8% |
| 1960 | 119,067 | | 18.2% |
| 1970 | 142,687 | | 19.8% |
| 1980 | 160,022 | | 12.1% |
| 1990 | 150,973 | | −5.7% |
| 2000 | 158,668 | | 5.1% |
| 2010 | 165,224 | | 4.1% |
| 2020 | 174,669 | | 5.7% |
| 2025 (est.) | 175,259 | ▲ | 0.3% |
U.S. Decennial Census; 1790–1960 1900–1990; 1990–2000 2010–2020

As of the second quarter of 2025, the median home value in Scott County was $269,146.

As of the 2024 American Community Survey, there are 73,767 estimated households in Scott County with an average of 2.33 persons per household. The county has a median household income of $77,355. Approximately 11.3% of the county's population lives at or below the poverty line. Scott County has an estimated 63.8% employment rate, with 37.0% of the population holding a bachelor's degree or higher and 93.2% holding a high school diploma. There were 79,244 housing units at an average density of 172.98 per square mile (66.8/km^{2}).

The top five reported languages (people were allowed to report up to two languages, thus the figures will generally add to more than 100%) were English (90.8%), Spanish (3.0%), Indo-European (1.9%), Asian and Pacific Islander (2.1%), and Other (2.3%).

The median age in the county was 40.2 years.

Scott County, Iowa – racial and ethnic composition Note: the US Census treats Hispanic/Latino as an ethnic category. This table excludes Latinos from the racial categories and assigns them to a separate category. Hispanics/Latinos may be of any race.
| Race / ethnicity (NH = non-Hispanic) | Pop. 1980 | Pop. 1990 | Pop. 2000 | Pop. 2010 | Pop. 2020 |
|---|---|---|---|---|---|
| White alone (NH) | 148,541 (92.83%) | 136,942 (90.70%) | 137,382 (86.58%) | 136,884 (82.85%) | 134,578 (77.05%) |
| Black or African American alone (NH) | 6,546 (4.09%) | 7,861 (5.21%) | 9,498 (5.99%) | 11,413 (6.91%) | 13,701 (7.84%) |
| Native American or Alaska Native alone (NH) | 339 (0.21%) | 439 (0.29%) | 425 (0.27%) | 369 (0.22%) | 324 (0.19%) |
| Asian alone (NH) | 815 (0.51%) | 1,324 (0.88%) | 2,476 (1.56%) | 3,295 (1.99%) | 4,824 (2.76%) |
| Pacific Islander alone (NH) | — | — | 29 (0.02%) | 53 (0.03%) | 57 (0.03%) |
| Other race alone (NH) | 228 (0.14%) | 160 (0.11%) | 172 (0.11%) | 167 (0.10%) | 523 (0.30%) |
| Mixed race or multiracial (NH) | — | — | 2,241 (1.41%) | 3,846 (2.33%) | 8,570 (4.91%) |
| Hispanic or Latino (any race) | 3,553 (2.22%) | 4,253 (2.82%) | 6,445 (4.06%) | 9,197 (5.57%) | 12,092 (6.92%) |
| Total | 160,022 (100.00%) | 150,973 (100.00%) | 158,668 (100.00%) | 165,224 (100.00%) | 174,669 (100.00%) |

=== 2020 census ===
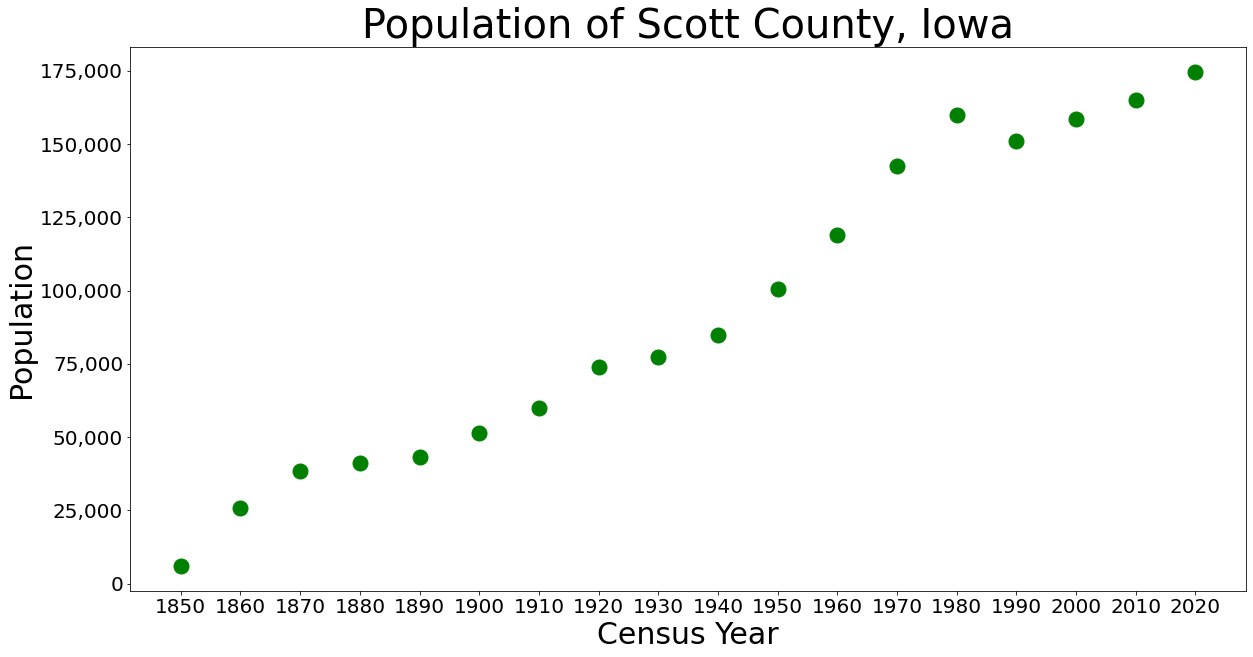
Population of Scott County from the U.S. census data

As of the 2020 census, there were 174,669 people, 71,628 households, and 45,007 families residing in the county. The population density was 381.29 inhabitants per square mile (147.2/km^{2}). There were 77,771 housing units at an average density of 169.77 per square mile (65.5/km^{2}). The racial makeup of the county was 79.44% White, 8.08% African American, 0.33% Native American, 2.78% Asian, 0.03% Pacific Islander, 1.94% from some other races and 7.39% from two or more races. Hispanic or Latino people of any race were 6.92% of the population.

The median age of 39.0 years; 23.4% of residents were under the age of 18 and 17.2% were 65 years of age or older. For every 100 females there were 96.3 males, and for every 100 females age 18 and over there were 94.5 males age 18 and over. The census also recorded a population density of 373.9/sq mi (144.4/km^{2}).

There were 71,628 households in the county, of which 29.6% had children under the age of 18 living in them. Of all households, 46.0% were married-couple households, 19.5% were households with a male householder and no spouse or partner present, and 26.8% were households with a female householder and no spouse or partner present. About 30.3% of all households were made up of individuals and 12.2% had someone living alone who was 65 years of age or older.

There were 77,771 housing units, of which 7.9% were vacant. Among occupied housing units, 67.2% were owner-occupied and 32.8% were renter-occupied. The homeowner vacancy rate was 1.6% and the rental vacancy rate was 11.3%.

86.7% of residents lived in urban areas, while 13.3% lived in rural areas.

=== 2010 census ===
As of the 2010 census, there were 165,224 people, 66,765 households, and _ families residing in the county. The population density was 360.67 inhabitants per square mile (139.3/km^{2}). There were 71,835 housing units at an average density of 156.81 per square mile (60.5/km^{2}). The racial makeup of the county was 86.11% White, 7.10% African American, 0.30% Native American, 2.02% Asian, 0.04% Pacific Islander, 1.47% from some other races and 2.97% from two or more races. Hispanic or Latino people of any race were 5.57% of the population.

=== 2000 census ===
As of the 2000 census, there were 158,668 people, 62,334 households, and 41,888 families in the county. The population density was 346.36 inhabitants per square mile (133.7/km^{2}). There were 65,649 housing units at an average density of 143.31 per square mile (55.3/km^{2}). The racial makeup of the county was 88.54% White, 6.11% African American, 0.32% Native American, 1.58% Asian, 0.02% Pacific Islander, 1.64% from some other races and 1.80% from two or more races. Hispanic or Latino people of any race were 4.06% of the population.

There were 62,334 households, 33.20% had children under the age of 18 living with them, 52.30% were married couples living together, 11.40% had a female householder with no husband present, and 32.80% were non-families. 26.90% of households were one person and 9.00% were one person aged 65 or older. The average household size was 2.49 and the average family size was 3.04.

The age distribution was 26.50% under the age of 18, 9.30% from 18 to 24, 29.40% from 25 to 44, 23.00% from 45 to 64, and 11.80% 65 or older. The median age was 35 years. For every 100 females, there were 95.80 males. For every 100 females age 18 and over, there were 92.50 males.

The median household income was $42,701 and the median family income was $52,045. Males had a median income of $38,985 versus $25,456 for females. The per capita income for the county was $21,310. About 7.70% of families and 10.50% of the population were below the poverty line, including 13.70% of those under age 18 and 5.80% of those age 65 or over.

== Communities ==
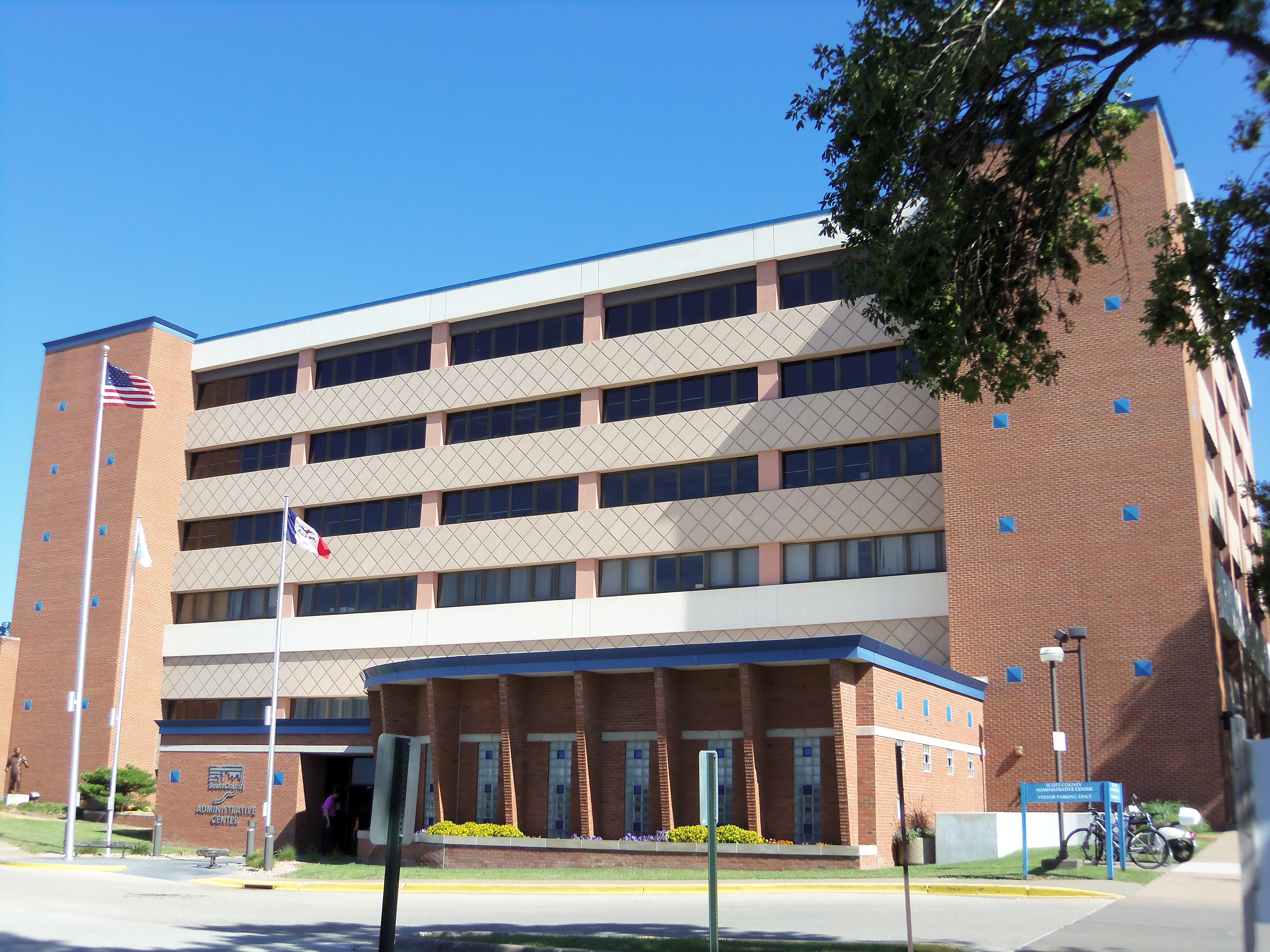
Scott County Administration Building

=== Cities ===
- Bettendorf
- Blue Grass
- Buffalo
- Davenport
- Dixon
- Donahue
- Durant
- Eldridge
- LeClaire
- Long Grove
- Maysville
- McCausland
- New Liberty
- Panorama Park
- Princeton
- Riverdale
- Walcott

=== Census-designated places ===
- Argo
- Big Rock
- Park View
- Plainview

=== Other unincorporated communities ===
- Desmond Acres
- Sherton Heights

=== Townships ===
- Allens Grove
- Blue Grass
- Buffalo
- Butler
- Cleona
- Davenport (City)
- Hickory Grove
- LeClaire
- Liberty
- Lincoln
- Pleasant Valley
- Princeton
- Sheridan
- Winfield

==== Former township ====
- Rockingham

=== Population ranking ===
The population ranking of the following table is based on the 2020 census of Scott County.

† county seat

| Rank | City/town/etc. | Municipal type | Population (2020 Census) | Population (2024 Estimate) |
|---|---|---|---|---|
| 1 | † Davenport | City | 101,724 | 100,938 |
| 2 | Bettendorf | City | 39,102 | 40,281 |
| 3 | Eldridge | City | 6,726 | 6,967 |
| 4 | LeClaire | City | 4,710 | 4,776 |
| 5 | Park View | CDP | 2,709 | 2,861 |
| 6 | Durant (partially in Cedar and Muscatine counties) | City | 1,871 | 1,798 |
| 7 | Blue Grass (partially in Muscatine County) | City | 1,666 | 1,707 |
| 8 | Walcott (partially in Muscatine County) | City | 1,551 | 1,556 |
| 9 | Buffalo | City | 1,176 | 1,163 |
| 10 | Princeton | City | 923 | 917 |
| 11 | Long Grove | City | 838 | 849 |
| 12 | Riverdale | City | 379 | 385 |
| 13 | Donahue | City | 335 | 336 |
| 14 | McCausland | City | 313 | 314 |
| 15 | Dixon | City | 202 | 204 |
| 16 | Maysville | City | 156 | 155 |
| 17 | Panorama Park | City | 139 | 142 |
| 18 | New Liberty | City | 138 | 141 |

== Politics ==
For most of its history, Scott County was primarily a Republican county. From 1880 to 1984, it only supported a Democrat for president nine times, six of which were national Democratic landslides. In more recent elections, the county has become consistently Democratic in presidential elections like many other midsize urban counties nationwide, with the party's candidates winning the county in every presidential election from 1988 on. Despite these victories, their margins of victory have not been as wide as in many other counties of similar composition, especially in 2016 when Hillary Clinton only won the county by 1,291 votes; yet Scott County remains relatively Democratic-leaning. However, in the 2022 elections, Republicans swept Scott County, with the county voting for the Republican candidates for all statewide offices, as well as for Republican Mariannette Miller-Meeks for U.S. House of Representatives. Notably, Republican governor Kim Reynolds won the county with a margin of over 10 points.

In 2024, Republican Donald Trump flipped Scott County in a presidential race for the first time in 40 years when it was won by Ronald Reagan in his landslide 1984 victory.

United States presidential election results for Scott County, Iowa
| Year | Republican | | Democratic | | Third party(ies) | |
| Year | No. | % | No. | % | No. | % |
|---|---|---|---|---|---|---|
| 1880 | 4,322 | 61.04% | 2,594 | 36.63% | 165 | 2.33% |
| 1884 | 2,740 | 34.31% | 5,200 | 65.11% | 47 | 0.59% |
| 1888 | 2,832 | 32.82% | 5,692 | 65.97% | 104 | 1.21% |
| 1892 | 2,999 | 32.15% | 6,205 | 66.52% | 124 | 1.33% |
| 1896 | 6,419 | 58.73% | 4,032 | 36.89% | 479 | 4.38% |
| 1900 | 6,327 | 52.05% | 5,157 | 42.43% | 671 | 5.52% |
| 1904 | 6,789 | 51.96% | 4,931 | 37.74% | 1,346 | 10.30% |
| 1908 | 6,845 | 50.75% | 5,845 | 43.33% | 799 | 5.92% |
| 1912 | 1,568 | 11.46% | 5,632 | 41.17% | 6,479 | 47.36% |
| 1916 | 8,329 | 56.39% | 5,212 | 35.29% | 1,229 | 8.32% |
| 1920 | 16,233 | 58.75% | 5,473 | 19.81% | 5,925 | 21.44% |
| 1924 | 18,360 | 60.32% | 4,347 | 14.28% | 7,731 | 25.40% |
| 1928 | 16,974 | 56.47% | 12,942 | 43.06% | 142 | 0.47% |
| 1932 | 14,218 | 43.81% | 16,887 | 52.03% | 1,350 | 4.16% |
| 1936 | 12,691 | 37.17% | 20,737 | 60.73% | 717 | 2.10% |
| 1940 | 18,504 | 46.69% | 20,996 | 52.98% | 130 | 0.33% |
| 1944 | 18,015 | 48.58% | 18,962 | 51.14% | 104 | 0.28% |
| 1948 | 16,842 | 49.42% | 16,661 | 48.89% | 578 | 1.70% |
| 1952 | 29,719 | 61.88% | 17,807 | 37.08% | 500 | 1.04% |
| 1956 | 27,965 | 59.37% | 18,969 | 40.27% | 170 | 0.36% |
| 1960 | 27,617 | 54.50% | 23,004 | 45.40% | 50 | 0.10% |
| 1964 | 19,488 | 38.14% | 31,526 | 61.70% | 84 | 0.16% |
| 1968 | 25,783 | 46.86% | 24,596 | 44.71% | 4,639 | 8.43% |
| 1972 | 34,135 | 57.41% | 23,810 | 40.05% | 1,510 | 2.54% |
| 1976 | 35,021 | 53.11% | 29,771 | 45.15% | 1,148 | 1.74% |
| 1980 | 34,701 | 51.09% | 26,391 | 38.85% | 6,834 | 10.06% |
| 1984 | 38,034 | 53.41% | 32,550 | 45.71% | 628 | 0.88% |
| 1988 | 31,025 | 46.98% | 34,415 | 52.12% | 595 | 0.90% |
| 1992 | 28,844 | 38.63% | 33,765 | 45.22% | 12,053 | 16.14% |
| 1996 | 26,751 | 41.03% | 32,694 | 50.14% | 5,757 | 8.83% |
| 2000 | 32,801 | 46.48% | 35,857 | 50.81% | 1,910 | 2.71% |
| 2004 | 39,958 | 48.30% | 42,122 | 50.92% | 642 | 0.78% |
| 2008 | 36,365 | 42.10% | 48,927 | 56.64% | 1,086 | 1.26% |
| 2012 | 38,251 | 42.38% | 50,652 | 56.12% | 1,360 | 1.51% |
| 2016 | 39,149 | 45.41% | 40,440 | 46.90% | 6,631 | 7.69% |
| 2020 | 43,683 | 47.17% | 46,926 | 50.68% | 1,990 | 2.15% |
| 2024 | 45,976 | 51.01% | 42,479 | 47.13% | 1,678 | 1.86% |

== Education ==
Public school districts in Scott County include:

- Bennett Community School District
- Bettendorf Community School District, Bettendorf
- Calamus–Wheatland Community School District, Wheatland
- Davenport Community School District, Davenport
- Durant Community School District, Durant
- North Scott Community School District, Eldridge
- Pleasant Valley Community School District, Riverdale, Bettendorf, LeClaire

=== Higher education institutions ===
- Scott Community College is located in Riverdale
- Saint Ambrose University is located in Davenport

== See also ==
- National Register of Historic Places listings in Scott County, Iowa
- Upper Mississippi River National Wildlife and Fish Refuge
