= Maysville, Iowa =

- City
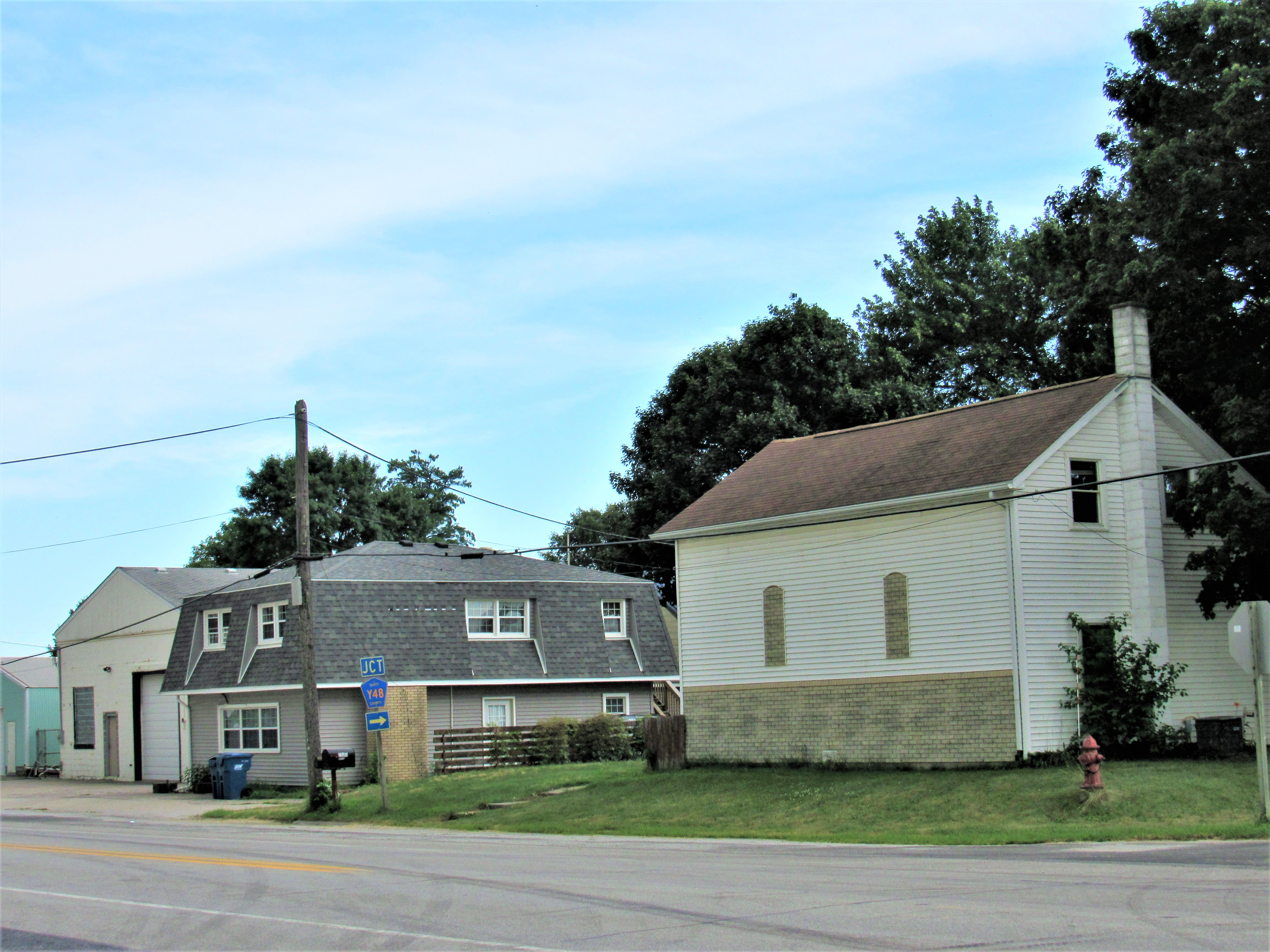
- Street scene in Maysville
- Motto: Viva La Maysville
- Location of Maysville, Iowa
- Coordinates: 41°38′58″N 90°43′07″W
- Country: United States
- State: Iowa
- County: Scott

Area
  - Total: 0.27 sq mi (0.71 km^{2})
  - Land: 0.27 sq mi (0.71 km^{2})
  - Water: 0 sq mi (0.00 km^{2})
- Elevation: 738 ft (225 m)

Population (2020)
  - Total: 156
  - Density: 570.3/sq mi (220.21/km^{2})
- Time zone: UTC-6 (Central (CST))
  - Summer (DST): UTC-5 (CDT)
- ZIP code: 52773
- Area code: 563
- FIPS code: 19-50655
- GNIS feature ID: 2395054

Maysville is a city in Scott County, Iowa, United States. The population was 156 at the time of the 2020 census.

== Geography ==
According to the United States Census Bureau, the city has a total area of 0.27 square miles (0.70 km^{2}), all land.

== Demographics ==
Historical populations
| Year | Pop. | ±% |
|---|---|---|
| 1910 | 55 | — |
| 1920 | 85 | +54.5% |
| 1930 | 57 | −32.9% |
| 1940 | 44 | −22.8% |
| 1950 | 70 | +59.1% |
| 1960 | 126 | +80.0% |
| 1970 | 170 | +34.9% |
| 1980 | 151 | −11.2% |
| 1990 | 170 | +12.6% |
| 2000 | 163 | −4.1% |
| 2010 | 176 | +8.0% |
| 2020 | 156 | −11.4% |
Source:"American FactFinder". United States Census Bureau. and Iowa Data Center; Source: U.S. Decennial Census

=== 2020 census ===
As of the census of 2020, there were 156 people, 69 households, and 52 families residing in the city. The population density was 570.3 inhabitants per square mile (220.2/km^{2}). There were 70 housing units at an average density of 255.9 per square mile (98.8/km^{2}). The racial makeup of the city was 96.8% White, 0.0% Black or African American, 0.0% Native American, 0.0% Asian, 0.0% Pacific Islander, 0.6% from other races and 2.6% from two or more races. Hispanic or Latino persons of any race comprised 1.9% of the population.

Of the 69 households, 21.7% of which had children under the age of 18 living with them, 58.0% were married couples living together, 8.7% were cohabitating couples, 21.7% had a female householder with no spouse or partner present and 11.6% had a male householder with no spouse or partner present. 24.6% of all households were non-families. 15.9% of all households were made up of individuals, 5.8% had someone living alone who was 65 years old or older.

The median age in the city was 40.5 years. 24.4% of the residents were under the age of 20; 3.8% were between the ages of 20 and 24; 26.3% were from 25 and 44; 25.0% were from 45 and 64; and 20.5% were 65 years of age or older. The gender makeup of the city was 46.2% male and 53.8% female.

=== 2010 census ===
As of the census of 2010, there were 176 people, 68 households, and 51 families living in the city. The population density was 651.9 inhabitants per square mile (251.7/km^{2}). There were 69 housing units at an average density of 255.6 per square mile (98.7/km^{2}). The racial makeup of the city was 98.9% White, 0.6% Asian, and 0.6% from two or more races.

There were 68 households, of which 25.0% had children under the age of 18 living with them, 63.2% were married couples living together, 7.4% had a female householder with no husband present, 4.4% had a male householder with no wife present, and 25.0% were non-families. 20.6% of all households were made up of individuals, and 10.3% had someone living alone who was 65 years of age or older. The average household size was 2.59 and the average family size was 2.96.

The median age in the city was 47.8 years. 20.5% of residents were under the age of 18; 9.1% were between the ages of 18 and 24; 14.7% were from 25 to 44; 40.4% were from 45 to 64; and 15.3% were 65 years of age or older. The gender makeup of the city was 50.0% male and 50.0% female.

=== 2000 census ===
As of the census of 2000, there were 163 people, 62 households, and 46 families living in the city. The population density was 598.7 inhabitants per square mile (231.2/km^{2}). There were 63 housing units at an average density of 231.4 per square mile (89.3/km^{2}). The racial makeup of the city was 100.00% White. Hispanic or Latino of any race were 0.61% of the population.

There were 62 households, out of which 27.4% had children under the age of 18 living with them, 66.1% were married couples living together, 4.8% had a female householder with no husband present, and 25.8% were non-families. 22.6% of all households were made up of individuals, and 6.5% had someone living alone who was 65 years of age or older. The average household size was 2.63 and the average family size was 3.11.

21.5% are under the age of 18, 13.5% from 18 to 24, 23.9% from 25 to 44, 29.4% from 45 to 64, and 11.7% who were 65 years of age or older. The median age was 40 years. For every 100 females, there were 111.7 males. For every 100 females age 18 and over, there were 124.6 males.

The median income for a household in the city was $52,500, and the median income for a family was $54,750. Males had a median income of $40,536 versus $26,250 for females. The per capita income for the city was $23,404. None of the families and 1.8% of the population were living below the poverty line.

== Education ==
Maysville is part of the North Scott Community School District, which spans 220 square miles (570 km^{2}) in northern Scott County.
