= List of museums in Iowa =

This list of museums in Iowa is a list of museums, defined for this context as institutions (including nonprofit organizations, government entities, and private businesses) that collect and care for objects of cultural, artistic, scientific, or historical interest and make their collections or related exhibits available for public viewing. Museums that exist only in cyberspace (i.e., virtual museums) are not included.

== Museums ==
Name	Location	County	Region	Area of study	Summary
4-H Schoolhouse Museum	Clarion	Wright	Central	School	Located at Heartland Museum Complex, operated by Heartland Museum
Abbe Creek School	Cedar Rapids	Linn	East	Education	One-room schoolhouse, operated by the Linn County Conservation Board
Abbie Gardner Sharp Cabin	Arnolds Park	Dickinson	West	Historic house	Operated by the State Historical Society of Iowa, restored to 1856 appearance, history of 1857 Spirit Lake Massacre
Ackley Heritage Center	Ackley	Hardin	Central	Local history	website includes museum and soda shop, Prairie Settlement I-House, one room schoolhouse
Adair County Heritage Museum	Greenfield	Adair	West	Open air	Includes country school, church, a late 19th-century historic house, museum with local history artifacts, railroad depot, operated by the Adair County Historical Society
Adams County House of History	Corning	Adams	West	Local history	Located in a former jail
African American Historical Culture Museum	Waterloo	Black Hawk	East	African American	The African American Historical and Cultural Museum of Waterloo preserves and shares Black history of Iowa and beyond through exhibits, artifacts, and stories. Learn more at www.aahcmuseum.org.
African American Museum of Iowa	Cedar Rapids	Linn	East	African American	African American heritage and culture of Iowa
Airpower Museum	Ottumwa	Wapello	Central	Aviation	Includes historic aircraft, engines, propellers, photos and original art
Albert City Historical Museum	Albert City	Buena Vista	West	Local history	
Allamakee County Historical Museum	Waukon	Allamakee	East	Local history	Located in the former county courthouse, log cabin also on grounds, operated by the Allamakee County Historical Society
Allee Mansion	Newell	Buena Vista	West	Historic house	Operated by the Newell Historical Society, Victorian-period house and museum with of coffee pots, art work and artifacts from around the world
Alton Public Library & Historical Museum	Alton	Sioux	West	Local history	website
Altoona Area Historical Society Museum	Altoona	Polk	Central	Local history	website
Amana Community Church	Homestead	Iowa	East	Religious	1865 Amana Community church building, one of seven Amana village churches of the Community of True Inspiration, operated by the Amana Heritage Society
Amana Heritage Museum	Amana	Iowa	East	Religious	website, religious and cultural history of the Amana Colonies displayed in three 19th-century buildings
American Gothic House	Eldon	Wapello	Central	Art	website Site of the house used as the background for Grant Wood's painting American Gothic
American Passenger Train History Museum	Charles City	Floyd	Central	Railroad	website, Founded in 2018. Home to a collection historic passenger rail cars from the golden age of American railroading. Located on the former yard and shop complex of the Charles City Western Railway. Restoring historic Milwaukee Road Depot after moving to property.
Ames History Center	Ames	Story	Central	Local history	website, operated by the Ames Historical Society
Anamosa State Penitentiary Museum	Anamosa	Jones	East	Law enforcement	History of the Anamosa State Penitentiary
Andy Williams Birthplace Home	Wall Lake	Sac	West	Historic house	1930s home of singer Andy Williams
Ankeny Art Center	Ankeny	Polk	Central	Art	website
Ankeny Area Historical Society Museums	Ankeny	Polk	Central	Local history	website
Antique Car Museum of Iowa	Coralville	Johnson	East	Automotive	website, includes over 90 cars ranging from year 1899 to the mid-1970s, an early 20th-century Skelly Oil gas station
Antique Tractor Showcase	Carlisle	Warren	Central	Tractor	Facebook site, open by appointment, tractors are rotated through showcase
Appanoose County Historical & Coal Mining Museum	Centerville	Appanoose	South	Mining	website, coal mining, transportation, local history
Armstrong Heritage Museum	Armstrong	Emmet	West	Local history	website, open by appointment
Armstrong House	Britt	Hancock	Central	Historic house	Victorian house, operated by the Hancock County Historical Society
Arts on Grand	Spencer	Clay	West	Art	website, community visual arts center with exhibitions
Audubon County Historical Society Museum	Exira	Audubon	West	Local history	Located in the county's first courthouse
Audubon Public Library & Cultural Center	Audubon	Audubon	West	Doll	website houses the John James Audubon Cultural Center with an antique doll and toy museum
Bedstemor's House	Elk Horn	Shelby	West	Historic house	Operated by Museum of Danish America, also known as the Christensen House, 1910 period house
Behrens-Rapp Service Station Museum and Tourist Center	Cedar Falls	Black Hawk	East	Local history	Operated by the Cedar Falls Historical Society, 1925 historic gas station with visible glass pumps, vintage signage, and other gas station items
Belinda Toy And Antique Museum	Chariton	Lucas	West	Toy	Toy airplanes, tractors, dolls, trains, and tin and cast-iron toys, open by appointment
Belle Plaine Area Museum	Belle Plaine	Benton	East	Local history	website
Belmond Museum	Belmond	Wright	Central	Local history	website, operated by the Belmond Historical Society
Bennett School	West Des Moines	Polk	Central	School	[ website], operated by the West Des Moines Historical Society, mid 20th-century one-room schoolhouse
Big Creek Historical Society Museum	Polk City	Polk	Central	Local history	website, located in the historic City Hall
Bily Clocks Museum & Antonín Dvořák Exhibit	Spillville	Winneshiek	East	Multiple	website, hand-carved clocks, exhibit about Czech composer Antonín Dvořák, log cabin
B.J. Palmer Mansion	Davenport	Scott	East	Historic house	Part of Palmer College of Chiropractic, Victorian mansion
Blakesburg Community Museum	Blakesburg	Wapello	Central	Local history	website, operated by the Blakesburg Historical Preservation Society
Blanden Memorial Art Museum	Fort Dodge	Webster	Central	Art	website, collection includes modem American and European paintings, African sculptures, and 16th-20th-century American, European and Japanese prints
Blue Bunny Ice Cream Parlor and Museum	Le Mars	Plymouth	West	Food	website, history of ice cream, history of Wells Dairy, simulated production room
Bob Feller Museum	Van Meter	Dallas	Central	Biographical	Baseball player Bob Feller
Boone and Scenic Valley Railroad	Boone	Boone	Central	Railroad	Operated by the Iowa Railroad Historical Society, heritage railroad and museum
Boone County Historical Center	Boone	Boone	Central	Local history	Operated by the Boone County Historical Society
Bremer County Historical Society Museum	Waverly	Bremer	East	Local history	website, located in the Waverly House
Brucemore	Cedar Rapids	Linn	East	Historic house	21 room Queen Anne mansion
Brunnier Art Museum	Ames	Story	Central	Art	Part of Iowa State Center of Iowa State University, features a fine and decorative arts collections including ceramics, glass, dolls, ivory, jade, enameled metals, prints, paintings, sculptures, textiles, carpets, wood objects, lacquered pieces, silver, and furniture
Buena Vista County Historical Society Museum	Storm Lake	Buena Vista	West	Local history	website
Buffalo Bill Cody Homestead	McCausland	Scott	Central	Biographical	1847 boyhood home of Buffalo Bill Cody
Buffalo Bill Museum	Le Claire	Scott	East	Local history	Exhibits about Buffalo Bill Cody, engineer James Buchanan Eads and inventor James Ryan, life along the Mississippi River
Burlington Northern Depot & WWII Memorial Museum	Red Oak	Montgomery	West	Military	website, restored 1903 railroad depot containing collection of materials and artifacts pertaining to sacrifices of Montgomery County Iowa citizens on the war front and home front during WWII, railroad history research library, gift shop, and meeting facilities.
Butler County Museum	Allison	Butler	Central	Local history	Open during the Butler County Fair
Calhoun County Museum	Rockwell City	Calhoun	West	Local history	
Calkins Square	Wyoming	Jones	East	Historic house	website, open by appointment, mid 19th-century house, includes authentic country doctor's office
Calliope Village	Hawarden	Sioux	West	Open air	Re-creation of Sioux County's first county seat, 16 buildings
Camanche Depot	Camanche	Clinton	East	Railroad	Open by appointment, restored 1951 Milwaukee/Soo Line caboose and railroad depot
Camanche Historical Museum	Camanche	Clinton	East	Local history	Open by appointment with the Clinton County/Gateway Genealogical Library
Camp Algona POW Museum	Algona	Kossuth	West	History	website, site of a German POW camp in World War II
Cannonball 457	Mason City	Cerro Gordo	Central	Railroad	website, restored 1920s-period Minneapolis & St Louis Railroad steam locomotive #457
Carlisle Area Historical Society Museum	Carlisle	Warren	Central	Local history	website, Randleman House open for events
Carnegie Cultural Center	New Hampton	Chickasaw	East	Toy	website, toys, dolls, model trains, model circuses, doll houses, local history
Carrie Chapman Catt Girlhood Home	Charles City	Floyd	Central	Biographical	website, home of suffragette Carrie Chapman Catt
Carnegie Historical Museum	Fairfield	Jefferson		Local history	website, located in a former Carnegie library building
Carroll County Historical Museum	Carroll	Carroll		Local history	Operated by the Carroll County Historical Society in a former Carnegie library building
Carstens 1880 Farmstead	Shelby	Pottawattamie	West	Agriculture	website, open for events
Carter House Museum	Elkader	Clayton	East	Historic house	Operated by the Elkader Historical Society, 19th century period mansion
Cass County Historical Museum	Griswold	Cass	West	Local history	website
Catholic Historical Center at St. Boniface	Clinton	Clinton	East	Religious	Area Catholic heritage
Cedar Rapids Museum of Art	Cedar Rapids	Linn	East	Art	Includes large collection of works by Grant Wood
Cedar County Historical Society Museum	Tipton	Cedar	East	Local history	website, features a local history museum and a prairie village
Cedar Rock State Park	Quasqueton	Buchanan	East	Historic house	Also known as the Walter House or Lowell E. Walter House, designed by Frank Lloyd Wright
Central Community Historical Society Museum	DeWitt	Clinton	East	Local history	website
Christian Petersen Art Museum	Ames	Story	Central	Art	Part of Iowa State University, includes large sculpture collection of Christian Petersen, also site of Elizabeth and Byron Anderson Sculpture Garden
Clarinda Carnegie Art Museum	Clarinda	Page	West	Art	Located in a former Carnegie library,
Clark Museum Of Area History/ Clark's Antique Acres	Milford	Dickinson	West	Local history	Includes photos, memorabilia, signs, and Amusement Park game displays
Clarke County Historical Museum	Osceola	Clarke		Local history	Operated by the Clarke County Historical Society
Clay County Heritage Center	Spencer	Clay	West	Local history	website, operated by the Clay County Heritage
Clear Lake Arts Center	Clear Lake	Cerro Gordo	Central	Art	website, community visual arts center with galleries
Clermont Historical Society Museum	Clermont	Fayette	East	Local history	Open by appointment
Clinton County Historical Museum	Clinton	Clinton	East	Local history	website, operated by the Clinton County Historical Society
Clive Historical Society - Swanson Campus	Clive	Polk	Central	Local History	http://clivehistoricalsociety.org/ Operated by Clive Historical Society
Columbus Community Heritage Center	Columbus Junction	Louisa	East	Local history	Operated by the Louisa County Historical Society
Communal Agriculture Museum	South Amana	Iowa	East	Agriculture	Tools and equipment used on Amana's communal farms, operated by the Amana Heritage Society
Communal Kitchen & Cooper Shop Museum	Middle Amana	Iowa	East	History	Restored 1932-era communal kitchen for the local Amana Colonies, operated by the Amana Heritage Society
Conrad Heritage Hall and Museum	Conrad	Grundy	East	Local history	website, open by appointment
Correctionville Museum	Correctionville	Woodbury	West	Local history	
Country Life Center	Orient	Adair	Central	Biographical	website, birthplace farm of Henry Cantwell Wallace, operated by the Wallace Centers of Iowa
Country School Museum	Lake Mills	Winnebago	Central	School	Operated by the Lake Mills Historical Society
Curtis Mansion	Clinton	Clinton	East	Historic house	Restored Victorian home
Dairy Center	Calmar	Winneshiek	Central	Agriculture	website, dairy education center that includes the Iowa Dairy Museum, milking parlor and barns, operated by the Northeast Iowa Dairy Foundation
Danish Windmill Museum	Elk Horn	Shelby	West	Mill	website, authentic working Danish windmill
Davis County Historical Society Museum	Bloomfield	Davis		Open air	Includes the Findley home, a Mormon log cabin, livery barn, school, and church
DeBoer Grocery Museum and Little House Museum	Ashton	Osceola	West	History	Period grocery store and 1882 house
Delaware County Historical Museum Complex	Hopkinton	Delaware	East	Open air	Includes nine buildings
Depot and Rail Museum	Vinton	Benton	East	Railroad	Operated by the Benton County Historical Society
Des Moines Art Center	Des Moines	Polk	Central	Art	Collection of paintings, sculpture, modern art and mixed media
Des Moines County Heritage Center Museum	Burlington	Des Moines	East	Local history	website, operated by the Des Moines County Historical Society, also operates the Phelps House and Hawkeye Log Cabin
Dexter Historical Museum	Dexter	Dallas	Central	Local history	website
Dickinson County Museum	Spirit Lake	Dickinson	West	Local history	website, operated by the Dickinson County Historical Society in a former depot
Donna Reed Heritage Museum	Denison	Crawford	West	Biographical	website, life of actress Donna Reed, located in the Donna Reed Performing Arts Center
Dorothy Pecaut Nature Center	Sioux City	Woodbury	West	Natural history	Located in Stone State Park
Dover Museum	New London	Henry	East	Local history	website, operated by the Dover Historical Society, period room and business displays
Dow House	Dow City	Crawford	West	Historic house	Operated by the Crawford County Conservation Board, late 19th-century house
Dubuque Museum of Art	Dubuque	Dubuque	East	Art	website, concentrates on 20th-century American art with an emphasis on American Regionalism
Dumont Museum	Sigourney	Keokuk	East	Agriculture	website], includes tractors, horse drawn equipment, buggies and gas engines, toys, dolls, and dishes, Roy Rogers memorabilia collection, model train layout
Dysart Historical Center	Dysart	Tama	Central	Local history	website
Eagle Grove Historical Museum	Eagle Grove	Wright	Central	Local history	
Eddyville Historical Museum	Eddyville	Wapello	Central	Local history	Open by appointment and for events
Edinburgh Pioneer Village	Scotch Grove	Jones	East	Open air	website, operated by the Jones County Historical Society, reconstructed village includes a one-room schoolhouse, blacksmith shop, church, railroad depot and log houses
Effigy Mounds National Monument	Harpers Ferry	Allamakee	East	Native American	Archaeology and natural history of the more than 200 prehistoric mounds built by Native Americans
Eldon Depot Museum	Eldon	Wapello	Central	Railroad	website, located in a historic Rock Island Railroad depot
Ellston Pioneer Museum	Ellston	Ringgold	East	Open air	Includes restored Cornwall Pioneer Home, a rural school, and the National Old Thresherman's Hall of Fame
Emmet County Historical Society Museum	Estherville	Emmet	West	Open air	Includes the museum, school, church, blacksmith shop, farm heritage building
Family Museum	Bettendorf	Scott	East	Children's	website
Farmall-Land U.S.A.	Avoca	Pottawatomie	West	Agriculture	website, tractors and farm equipment
Farnham Galleries	Indianola	Warren	Central	Art	website, part of Simpson College in Mary Berry Hall
Farm House Museum	Ames	Story	Central	Historic house	Part of Iowa State University, 19th-century farm house, open by appointment, 1860 farm home with 19th- and early 20th-century decorative arts, furnishings and material culture reflecting Iowa State and Iowa heritage
Faulconer Gallery	Grinnell	Poweshiek	East	Art	Part of the Bucksbaum Center for the Arts at Grinnell College
Felix Adler Children's Discovery Center	Clinton	Clinton	East	Children's	website
FFA Historical and Ag Museum	La Porte City	Black Hawk	Central	Local history	website, antiques, local memorabilia; also operates the Rural Iowa Heritage Center
Figge Art Museum	Davenport	Scott	East	Art	Known for its extensive collection of Haitian, Colonial Mexican and Midwestern art, particularly pieces by Thomas Hart Benton, Marvin Cone and Grant Wood
Floyd County Historical Museum	Charles City	Floyd	Central	Local history	website, operated by the Floyd County Historical Society
Fonda Museum	Fonda	Pocahontas	West	Local history	Antiques, small-town memorabilia
Forest Park Museum and Arboretum	Perry	Dallas	Central	Open air	Arboretum and complex of historic buildings with period and local history exhibits
Fort Atkinson State Preserve	Fort Atkinson	Winneshiek	East	Military	Mid 19th century U.S. Army frontier post created to keep the peace between various Native American tribes as well as prevent white settlers from encroaching on Indian lands
Fort Des Moines Museum and Education Center	Des Moines	Polk	Central	Military	Honors the U.S. Army's first officer candidate class for African American men in 1917, and the establishment of the first Women's Army Auxiliary Corps in 1942
Fort Museum	Fort Dodge	Webster	Central	Open air	website, frontier trading post, military and 19th century furniture exhibits
Fossil & Prairie Center	Rockford	Floyd	Central	Natural history	website, Devonian fossils and natural history of the Fossil & Prairie Park Preserve
Franklin County Historical Museum	Hampton	Franklin	Central	Local history	website, operated by the Franklin County Historical Society, includes period kitchens, clothing, entertainment, military history, machinery hall
Franklin Pearson House	Keosauqua	Van Buren	East	Historic house	website, maintained by the Van Buren County Historical Society, 1840s house that was a station on the Underground Railroad
French Icarian Colony Living History Museum	Corning	Adams	West	Living	website, history of six Icaria Colonies in America in the 1840s
Froelich Village	McGregor	Clayton	East	Open air	website, includes history of the tractor invented by John Froelich, 1886 one-room school, 1891 General Store museum, 19th-century shipping warehouse
Garnavillo Historical Museum	Garnavillo	Clayton	East	Open air	Operated by the Garnavillo Historical Society in a former church
George Maier Rural Heritage Center	Elkader	Clayton	East	History	Artifacts from rural Iowa history (1890 - 1950)
George M. Verity River Museum	Keokuk	Lee	East	Maritime	Riverboat museum of Upper Mississippi River history
German American Heritage Center	Davenport	Scott	East	Ethnic	History of German-Americans in the Midwest region
Gilbertson Conservation Education Area	Elgin	Fayette	East	Multiple	website, includes Gilbertson Nature Center, Mavis & Conner Dummermuth Building with farm tools and antiques, 1890s period Hart Dummermuth Historical House, petting zoo and trails
Glenn Miller Birthplace Museum	Clarinda	Page	West	Biographical	website, life of musician Glenn Miller
Glick-Sower House	Marshalltown	Marshall	Central	Historic house	Operated by the Historical Society of Marshall County by appointment
Graceland University Galleries	Lamoni	Decatur	Central	Art	website, Constance Gallery in the Helene Center for the Visual Arts, Helene Center Student Gallery, Shaw Center Gallery
Grafton Heritage Depot	Grafton	Worth	Central	Railroad	Operated by the Worth County Historical Society, open by appointment
Granger House Museum	Marion	Linn	East	Historic house	website, 1870s period home
Grant Wood Art Gallery	Anamosa	Jones	East	Art	website, life and paintings of Grant Wood
Greater Shenandoah Historical Society Museum	Shenandoah	Page	West	Local history	website, exhibits include area Mormon settlers and old time radio
Greene County Historical Museum	Jefferson	Greene	Central	Local history	
Greene Historical Museum	Greene	Butler	Central	Local history	
Grout Museum	Waterloo	Black Hawk	East	Multiple	Complex includes Grout Museum of History & Science, Rensselaer Russell House Museum, Snowden House, and Sullivan Brothers Iowa Veterans Museum
Grinnell Historical Museum	Grinnell	Poweshiek	East	Historic house	website, late 19th-century period McMurray House
Grotto of the Redemption	West Bend	Palo Alto	West	Religious	Catholic shrine featuring nine grottos depicting scenes in the life of Jesus, includes museum with a collection of minerals, precious and semiprecious stones from throughout the world
Grundy County Heritage Museum	Morrison	Grundy	Central	Local history	website, operated by the Grundy County Conservation Office, local and natural history, aquariums, a one-room schoolhouse, railroad building, and heritage Center & Agricultural Hall
Guthrie County Historical Village	Panora	Guthrie	Central	Open air	website
Hanlontown Community Bank Museum	Hanlontown	Worth	Central	Local history	Operated by the Worth County Historical Society
Hardin County Farm Museum	Eldora	Hardin	Central	Agriculture	Agriculture equipment, agricultural practices, life styles, and history of Hardin County farm families and agri-businesses during the period of 1850-1950
Harker House	Storm Lake	Buena Vista	West	Historic house	website, 1875 house with three generations of family furnishings
Harlan-Lincoln House	Mount Pleasant	Henry	East	Historic house	Open by appointment, part of Iowa Wesleyan College, features memorabilia related to Senator James Harlan and Abraham Lincoln
Harriman Nielsen Farm	Hampton	Franklin	Central	Historic house	Operated by the Franklin County Historical Society, late 19th-century farmhouse
Harrison County Historical Village	Missouri Valley	Harrison	West	Open air	website, includes 19th century log cabin, general store and school, operated by the Harrison County Conservation Board
Hearst Center for the Arts	Cedar Falls	Black Hawk	East	Art	website
Heartland Acres Agribition Center	Independence	Buchanann	Central	Agriculture	website, agriculture exhibits, farm equipment, period displays, one-room school, automobiles, animals
Heartland Museum	Clarion	Wright	Central	Agriculture	website, farm equipment, store displays, teddy bears, streetscapes, operated by Heartland Museum Foundation
Hemken Collection	Williams	Hamilton	Central	Automotive	website, features American convertibles
Herbert Hoover National Historic Site	West Branch	Cedar	East	Biographical	Birthplace of President Herbert Hoover, includes Herbert Hoover Presidential Library and Museum
Heritage Park Museum	Primghar	O'Brien		Open air	Open by appointment
Higgins Museum of National Bank Notes	Okoboji	Dickinson	West	Numismatic	Collection of National Bank Note issues
Historic General Dodge House	Council Bluffs	Pottawatamie	West	Historic house	Victorian period home of Grenville M. Dodge
History Center	Cedar Rapids	Linn	East	Local history	website, history of Linn County, operated by the Linn County Historical Society
History on the Hill	Winterset	Madison	Central	Open air	website, operated by the Madison County Historical Society, includes Madison County Historical Museum, Bevington-Kaser Mansion, Winterset Train Depot, Zion Church, Field Mercantile Store, Stone Barn
Hitchcock House	Lewis	Cass	West	Historic house	Mid-19th-century house that was a station on the Underground Railway
Hockett House Museum	Earlham	Madison	Central	Historic house	Operated by the Earlham Historical Society, settler's house
Hoggatt School	Ames	Story	Central	School	website, operated by the Ames Historical Society
Homestead Blacksmith Shop	Homestead	Iowa	East	History	Original village blacksmith shop and forge, working offset printing press and Linotype machine, operated by the Amana Heritage Society
Homestead Store Museum	Homestead	Iowa	East	History	Amana Colonies' industries and products, operated by the Amana Heritage Society
Horridge House	Vinton	Benton	East	Local history	Operated by the Benton County Historical Society
Hotel Williams Museum	Wyoming	Jones	East	Local history	website, also known as Wyoming Historical Museum
Howard County Historical Preservation & Education Center	Cresco	Howard	North	Local history	website, operated by the Howard County Historical Society and the Howard County Agricultural Society, open during the Howard County Fair and by appointment
Hub City Heritage Corporation Railway Museum	Oelwein	Fayette	East	Railroad	website
Humboldt County Mill Farm Historical Museum	Dakota City	Humboldt	West	Open air	Includes the Victorian-period Corydon Brown House, school, barn with store displays, log cabin, antique vehicles and farm equipment, chicken house and jail
Ice House Museum	Cedar Falls	Black Hawk	East	History	Operated by the Cedar Falls Historical Society, ice house, tools and implements
Independence State Hospital	Independence	Buchanan	Central	Medical	Former psychiatric hospital, tours by appointment
Indian Creek Historical Museum	Emerson	Mills	West	Agriculture	website, operated by the Indian Creek Historical Society, includes antique farm equipment and machinery, a one-room school, pioneer log cabin and barn
International Fire Museum	Davenport	Scott	East	Firefighting	
Iowa 80 Trucking Museum	Walcott	Scott	East	Automotive	website Includes over 100 trucks and 300 examples of petroliana, part of the Iowa 80 truck stop
Iowa Aviation Museum	Greenfield	Adair	West	Aviation	Iowa's aviation heritage
Iowa Children's Museum	Coralville	Johnson	East	Children's	website
Iowa Civilian Conservation Corps Museum	Strawberry Point	Delaware	East	History	Activities of the Civilian Conservation Corps in Iowa state parks; located in Backbone State Park
Iowa Gold Star Military Museum	Johnston	Polk	Central	Military	website, Iowa's military past from statehood to the present, operated by the Iowa National Guard at Camp Dodge
Iowa Great Lakes Maritime Museum	Arnolds Park	Dickinson	West	Maritime	website, boating in Iowa Great Lakes region, located in Arnolds Park Amusement Park
Iowa Masonic Library and Museum	Cedar Rapids	Linn	East	History	Masonic artifacts, colonial, Indian and foreign exhibits, evolution of the written and printed word
Iowa Rock 'n Roll Music Museum	Arnolds Park	Dickinson	West	Music	website, includes a reproduction recording studio, 60s era radio broadcast booth, vintage recording equipment and hall of fame memorabilia
Iowa Rural Schools Museum	Odebolt	Sac	West	School	Rural one-room schoolhouse
Iowa State Capitol	Des Moines	Polk	Central	History	
Iowa Transportation Museum	Grinnell	Poweshiek	East	Transportation	website, planned museum under construction
Jackson County Museum	Maquoketa	Jackson	East	Local history	website, includes collection of agriculture equipment
Jasper County Historical Museum	Newton	Jasper	Central	Open air	website, includes Iowa Native American diorama, theater, quilt exhibit, agriculture equipment, washing machine collection, 1930s period house, 1875 barn, general store, post office, barber shop, country school, church and dress & millinery shop
Jefferson Telephone Museum	Jefferson	Greene	Central	Technology	Historic telephone equipment
Jenison-Meacham Memorial Art Museum	Belmond	Wright	Central	Open air	website, includes art center/museum, prairie farmstead, rural schoolhouse, working farm and machinery museum, operated by the Belmond Area Arts Council
John L. Lewis Memorial Museum of Mining and Labor	Lucas	Lucas	Central	Mining	website, exhibits about John L. Lewis, coal mining, labor and related topics
Johnny Carson Birthplace	Corning	Adams	West	Historic house	Birthplace home of entertainer Johnny Carson
Johnny Clock Museum	Lockridge	Jefferson		Horology	website, carved clocks
Johnson County Historical Society Museum	Coralville	Johnson	East	Local history	website, also operates the 1876 Coralville Schoolhouse, the Coralville Old Town Hall, and the Johnson County Historic Poor Farm by appointment
John Wayne Birthplace Museum	Winterset	Madison	Central	Biographical	website, birthplace home of actor John Wayne
Jordan House	West Des Moines	Polk	Central	Historic house	1880s Victorian period house, includes local history exhibits and Underground Railroad exhibit
Kalona Historical Village	Kalona	Washington	East	Open air	website, includes 13 authentically restored buildings about Amish and Mennonite history and culture
Kalona Quilt & Textile Museum	Kalona	Washington	East	Textile	website
Kate Shelley Depot	Moingona	Boone	Central	Biographical	website, story of Kate Shelley and area railroad history, open by appointment with the Boone County Historical Society
Kellogg Historical Museum	Kellogg	Jasper	East	Open air	website includes main museum building, factory/bank museum, country school, church and blacksmith shop, operated by the Kellogg Historical Society
Kellow House	Cresco	Howard	North	Historic house	Operated by the Howard County Historical Society, open by appointment, Victorian home
Kensett Community Church Museum	Kensett	Worth	Central	Local history	Operated by the Worth County Historical Society
Kinney Pioneer Museum	Mason City	Cerro Gordo	Central	Open air	Iowa frontier life and pioneer village, includes a one-room school house, log cabin, jail, blacksmith shop
Kiwanis Railroad Depot Museum Complex	Onawa	Monona	West	Railroad	
Kline Museum	Prescott	Adams	West	Transportation	Antique cars and farm vehicles, local memorabilia
Lake View Historical Museum	Lake View	Sac	West	Local history	Operated by the Lake View Historical Society, includes mounted bird collection, model train, log cabin, schoolhouse
Laura Ingalls Wilder Park and Museum	Burr Oak	Winneshiek	East	Biographical	website, Masters Hotel, childhood home of Laura Ingalls Wilder
Lewelling Quaker Museum	Salem	Henry	East	Historic house	website, station on the Underground Railroad
Liberty Hall	Lamoni	Decatur	Central	Historic house	1880s Victorian home of Joseph Smith III, president of Community of Christ
Lidtke Mill	Lime Springs	Howard	North	Mill	Water-powered grist mill
Little Red School House	Cedar Falls	Black Hawk	East	School	Operated by the Cedar Falls Historical Society, 1909 one-room schoolhouse
Littleton & Chatham Historical Society	Chatham (rural Independence)	Buchanan	East	Museum	Former Pleasant Grove Presbyterian Church on the National Register. Exhibits on education, mercantile, agriculture, military and the Richard O'Brien scale models of Littleton and Otterville buildings.
Living History Farms Museum	Urbandale	Polk	Central	Living	Farm life in the years of 1700, 1850 and 1900 and 1875 small-town life
Lockmaster's Heritage House Museum	Guttenberg	Clayton	East	Historic house	Operated by the Guttenberg Heritage Society, 19th-century lockmaster's house by Lock and Dam No. 10
Locust School	Decorah	Winneshiek	East	School	1854 one-room schoolhouse, operated by the Winneshiek County Historical Society
Louisa County Heritage Center	Wapello	Louisa	East	Local history	Operated by the Louisa County Historical Society, open by appointment
Lucas County Historical Museum	Chariton	Lucas	West	Open air	website, operated by the Lucas County Historical Society, includes a 1900s A.J. Stephens House, schoolhouse, church, 1800s barn and 1850 log cabin
Lyon County Historical Society Museum Complex	Rock Rapids	Lyon	West	Local history	Includes a renovated depot and caboose, a Victorian-period house, livery stable, windmill
Maasdam Barns	Fairfield	Jefferson		Agriculture	website, history of the Evergreen Ridge Stock Farm, features three barns and the farmhouse
MacNider Art Museum	Mason City	Cerro Gordo	Central	Art	American art and life, special collection of Bil Baird marionettes, hand puppets and ephemera
Madrid Historical Museum	Madrid	Boone	Central	Local history	website, operated by the Madrid Historical Society, includes doll collection and replica underground coal mine
Mamie Eisenhower Birthplace	Boone	Boone	Central	Biographical	website, operated by the Boone County Historical Society, birthplace of Mamie Eisenhower, wife of President Dwight Eisenhower
Marble Rock Museum	Marble Rock	Floyd	Central	Local history	website, operated by the Marble Rock Historical Society
Marion County Historical Village & Museum	Knoxville	Marion	Central	Open air	website, operated by the Marion County Historical Society, includes the museum, one-room schoolhouse, log cabin, railroad depot, general store, stage coach inn, church and machine annex
Marion Heritage Center & Museum	Marion	Linn	East	Local history	website, operated by the Marion Historical Society in a former church
Marquette Depot Museum	Marquette	Clayton	East	Railroad	Railroad artifacts, information center and gift shop
Marshall Center School	Cedar Falls	Black Hawk	East	School	website, part of University of Northern Iowa, 1920s period one-room school
Marshall County Historical Museum	Marshalltown	Marshall	Central	Local history	website, operated by the Historical Society of Marshall County
Matchstick Marvels Museum	Gladbrook	Tama	Central	Art	website, contains a museum with scaled models of lifelike sculptures, intricate machines, and world renown architecture made from matchsticks
Mathias Ham House	Dubuque	Dubuque	East	Historic house	1856 Victorian period house, 1833 settler's log cabin and a one-room schoolhouse, operated by the Dubuque County Historical Society
Matthew Edel Blacksmith Shop	Haverhill	Marshall	Central	Historic house	website, operated by the State Historical Society of Iowa, early 20th century blacksmith shop
McCallum Museum	Sibley	Osceola	West	Local history	Operated by the Osceola County Historical Society
McGregor Historical Museum	McGregor	Clayton	East	Local history	website, operated by the McGregor Historical Society
McHenry House	Denison	Crawford	West	Historic house	Operated by the Crawford County Historical Society, Victorian period home
Melcher-Dallas Coal Mining and Heritage Museum	Melcher-Dallas	Marion	Central	Mining	Reconstructed coal mine and mining exhibits
Meskwaki Cultural Center and Museum	Tama	Tama	East	Native American	
Mid America Museum of Aviation & Transportation	Sioux City	Woodbury	West	Aviation & Transportation	website
Midwest Old Threshers Heritage Museums	Mount Pleasant	Henry	East	Open air	Includes Midwest Electric Railway, rural life period displays, agriculture tools and equipment, dolls, printing presses, theater museum, steam and gas engines and more
Midwest Central Railroad	Mount Pleasant	Henry	East	Railroad	website, heritage railway
Mills County Historical Museum	Glenwood	Mills	West	Open air	website, operated by the Mills County Historical Society
Mitchell County Historical Museum	Osage	Mitchell		Local history	website, operated by the Mitchell County Historical Society in the former Cedar Valley Seminary, also owns Fort Severson, Walnut Grove School, Union Number 1 Schoolhouse & Log Cabin, Docken Cabin around the county
Monona County Historical Museum	Onawa	Monona	West	Local history	Operated by the Loess Hills Historical Society
Monona County Veteran's Memorial Museum	Onawa	Monona	West	Military	
Monona Historical Museum	Monona	Clayton	East	Local history	website, operated by the Monona Historical Society
Monroe County Historical Museum	Albia	Monroe	Central	Local history	Includes artifacts from 19th century homes, farms, and coal mines, operated by the Monroe County Historical Society
Montauk Mansion	Clermont	Fayette	Central	Historic house	website, operated by the State Historical Society of Iowa, home of Iowa's 12th governor, William Larrabee
Montgomery County History Center	Red Oak	Montgomery	West	Local history	website, operated by the Montgomery County Historical Society
Moorehead House Museum	Ida Grove	Ida	West	Historic house	Also known as the Ida County Historical Society Museum, Victorian-period house
Moorehead Stagecoach Inn	Ida Grove	Ida	West	Historic site	Mid 19th-century stagecoach inn, barn and schoolhouse
Moulton Historical Society	Moulton	Appanoose	South	Local history	
Mount Ayr Depot Museum	Mount Ayr	Ringgold	East	Railroad	website
Muscatine Art Center	Muscatine	Muscatine	East	Art	website
Muscatine History and Industry Center	Muscatine	Muscatine	East	Local history	website, formerly the Pearl Button Museum
Museum of Danish America	Elk Horn	Shelby	West	Ethnic	History and culture of the Danish-American experience
Music Man Square	Mason City	Cerro Gordo	Central	Biographical	website, includes the boyhood home and museum about composer Meredith Willson
Nathaniel Hamlin Park and Museum	Audubon	Audubon	West	Multiple	Former County Home Farm, includes a Victorian House museum, machinery building with antique farm and home artifacts, one room schoolhouse, blacksmith shop, barns, farm windmills and a walkout gazebo to see and feed the elk family
National Balloon Museum and Ballooning Hall of Fame	Indianola	Warren	Central	Sports	Exhibits history of ballooning and memorabilia, includes the U.S. Ballooning Hall of Fame
National Czech & Slovak Museum & Library	Cedar Rapids	Linn	East	Ethnic	Czech and Slovak history and culture
National Farm Toy Museum	Dyersville	Dubuque	Central	Toy	Toy farm equipment
National Hobo Museum	Britt	Hancock	Central	Culture	website, hobo artifacts collection, may be closed
National Mississippi River Museum & Aquarium	Dubuque	Dubuque	East	Maritime	Operated by the Dubuque County Historical Society, aquarium, William M. Black (dredge) and other historic boats, and Fred W. Woodward Riverboat Museum with cultural and natural history exhibits
National Motorcycle Museum	Anamosa	Jones	East	Transportation	Motorcycles and memorabilia
National Sprint Car Hall of Fame & Museum	Knoxville	Marion	Central	Automotive	sprint cars, racers and memorabilia
National Wrestling Hall of Fame Dan Gable Museum	Waterloo	Black Hawk	East	Sports	Includes the Glen Brand Wrestling Hall of Fame of Iowa
Nelson Pioneer Farm Museum	Oskaloosa	Mahaska	Central	Open air	website, operated by the Mahaska County Historical Society, mid-19th-century farmhouse, farm and other historic buildings
Nishna Heritage Museum	Oakland	Pottawatamie	West	Local history	Operated by the Oakland Historical Society
Nodaway Valley Historical Museum	Clarinda	Page	West	Open air	website, local history, historic household items, farm equipment, railroad depot, general store, barber shop, blacksmith shop, store/doctor's office, jail
North Lee County Historical Museum	Fort Madison	Lee	East	Open air	website, located in the Santa Fe Railway Depot Complex, local and railroad history
Octagon Center for the Arts	Ames	Story	Central	Art	website
Odebolt Historical Museum	Odebolt	Sac	West	Local history	website, open by appointment
Okoboji Classic Cars	Okoboji	Dickinson	West	Automotive	website, restored American classic cars in Main Street displays
Old Bradford Pioneer Village Museum	Nashua	Chickasaw	East	Open air	website, includes a log cabin, one-room school, cottage, general store, doctor's office, toy shop, church and jail, operated by the Chickasaw County Historical Society
Old Capitol Museum	Iowa City	Johnson	Central	Multiple	Part of the University of Iowa, changing history, art, culture exhibits
Old Creamery Museum	Northwood	Worth	Central	History	Operated by the Worth County Historical Society, 19th century period household tools and antiques
Old Fort Madison	Fort Madison	Lee	East	Living	website, 1812 period frontier fur trading post
Old Jail Museum	Dubuque	Dubuque	East	Prison	Operated by the Dubuque County Historical Society, also local history artifacts
Old Schoolhouse Museum	Earlham	Madison	Central	School	Operated by the Earlham Historical Society, town's first public school
Old Stone House	Hampton	Franklin	Central	Historic house	Operated by the Franklin County Historical Society by appointment, mid 19th-century farmhouse
Oxford Junction Heritage Museum	Oxford Junction	Jones	East	Local history	website
Palmer Museum of Chiropractic History	Davenport	Scott	East	Medical	website, part of Palmer College of Chiropractic
Palo Alto County Historical Museum	Emmetsburg	Palo Alto	West	Local history	Operated by the Palo Alto County Historical Society, open by appointment
Parker Museum	Spencer	Clay	West	Local history	website, operated by the Clay County Heritage
Pat Clark Art Collection	Iowa Falls	Hardin	Central	Art	website, part of Ellsworth Community College
Pearson Lakes Art Center	Okoboji	Dickinson	West	Art	website
Peirce Mansion	Sioux City	Woodbury	West	Historic house	Victorian period mansion, open for quarterly events, operated by the Sioux City Public Museum
Pella Historical Village	Pella	Marion	Central	Open air	website, operated by the Pella Historical Society, over 20 historic buildings in a Dutch village setting and the Vermeer Mill
Peterson Pioneer Home	Odebolt	Sac	West	Historic house	1886 pioneer home for a family of seven
Peterson Point Historical Farmstead	Wallingford	Emmet	West	Farm	Historic farmstead, includes house, barn, blacksmith shop complex, cook/wash house, chicken coop, hog house, and sheep barn, operated by the Emmet County Conservation Department
Pharmacists Mutual Companies Museum	Algona	Kossuth	West	Medical	
Pine Creek Gristmill	Muscatine	Muscatine	East	Mill	Located in Wildcat Den State Park
Pixley Log House	Northwood	Worth	Central	Historic house	Operated by the Worth County Historical Society, restored 1870s period log home and furnishings
Plum Grove Historic House	Iowa City	Johnson	Central	Historic house	Operated by the Johnson County Historical Society
Plymouth County Historical Museum	Le Mars	Plymouth	West	Local history	website
Pocahontas County Historical Museum	Rockwell City	Pocahontas	West	Local history	
Porter House Museum	Decorah	Winneshiek	East	Historic house	Victorian home of a naturalist and artist, includes collection of exotic butterflies
Prairie Learning Center	Prairie City	Jasper	Central	Natural history	website, museum and education center for the Neal Smith National Wildlife Refuge
Prairie Trails Museum	Corydon	Wayne	Central	History	website
Putnam Museum	Davenport	Scott	East	Natural history	
Quasdorf Blacksmith and Wagon Museum	Dows	Wright	Central	History	Operated by the Dows Historical Society
Quasqueton Area Historical Society Museum	Quasqueton	Buchanan	East	Local history	website
RailsWest Railroad Museum	Council Bluffs	Pottawatamie	West	Railroad	Operated by the Historical Society of Pottawattamie County, Iowa, railroad depot museum and model railroad display, outdoor railroad car displays
Ray House	Vinton	Benton	East	Historic house	Operated by the Benton County Historical Society, 1893 Victorian house
REA Power Plant Museum	Hampton	Franklin	Central	Technology	Operated by the Franklin County Historical Society, former power plant, exhibits show changes in farm life after the electrification of rural America
Richardson-Jakway House	Aurora	Buchanan	East	Historic house	19th-century house, operated by the Buchanan County Conservation Board in Jakway Forest Area
River History Museum	Lansing	Allamakee	East	Maritime	Includes exhibits about steam-boating, commercial fishing, pearl button industry and ice harvesting
River Music Experience	Davenport	Scott	East	Music	America's music, especially the music of the Mississippi River
Rock Island Depot Museum	Clarion	Wright	Central	Local history	Located in a restored depot, local and railroad history
Roland Museum	Roland	Story	Central	Local history	website, operated by the Roland Historical Society
Rural Free Delivery Museum	Morning Sun	Louisa	East	History	Oldest rural-free delivery post office in Iowa; historic post office display
Russell Historical Society Museum	Russell	Lucas	Central	Local history	website
Sac City Museum Village	Sac City	Sac	West	Open air	Includes museum, an old-time general store, church, doctor's office, post office
Salisbury House	Des Moines	Polk	Central	Historic house	1920s manor home
Samuel F. Miller House and Museum	Keokuk	Lee	East	Historic house	Operated by the Lee County Historical Society
Sanford Museum & Planetarium	Cherokee	Cherokee	West	Multiple	website, local history, natural history, art, archaeology, paleontology, geology
The Sawmill Museum	Clinton	Clinton	East	Forestry	website, importance of forests and wood products, area lumber industry, restored 1920s sawmill
Schildberg Antique Car Museum	Greenfield	Adair	West	Automotive	Open by appointment and for special local events
Scholte House Museum	Pella	Marion	Central	Historic house	website, mid-19th century 20 room house of Dutch pioneers
Science Center of Iowa	Des Moines	Polk	Central	Science	website
Sergeant Floyd River Museum and Welcome Center	Sioux City	Woodbury	West	Maritime	Historic inspection boat of the United States Army Corps of Engineers, exhibits on Lewis and Clark Expedition and Missouri River transportation
Shelby County Historical Museum	Harlan	Shelby	West	Local history	website, operated by the Shelby County Historical Society
Sheldon Prairie Museum	Sheldon	O'Brien		Open air	Located in the Carnegie Library (Sheldon, Iowa)
Shell Rock Historical Museum	Shell Rock	Butler	East	Local history	website
Sioux City Art Center	Sioux City	Woodbury	West	Art	
Sioux City Lewis & Clark Interpretive Center	Sioux City	Woodbury	West	History	website, history of the Corps of Discovery's time in the Sioux City area in 1804, and the Betty Strong Encounter Center that commemorates a history of encounters that occurred before and after the expedition
Sioux City Public Museum	Sioux City	Woodbury	West	Local history	City history, culture, agriculture, transportation
Sioux City Railroad Museum	Sioux City	Woodbury	West	Railroad	website, operated by the Siouxland Historical Railroad Association
Squirrel Cage Jail	Council Bluffs	Pottawatamie	West	Prison	Operated by the Historical Society of Pottawattamie County
St. Ansgar Heritage Museum	St. Ansgar	Mitchell	Central	Local history	website
St. Lucas German American Museum	St. Lucas, Iowa	Fayette	East	Ethnic	Operated by the St. Lucas Historical Society, exhibits and library about area German immigrants and heritage, local history and genealogy
State Historical Museum of Iowa	Des Moines	Polk	Central	History	Operated by the State Historical Society of Iowa
Stockman House	Mason City	Cerro Gordo	Central	Historic house	1908 house designed by Frank Lloyd Wright
Story City Museum	Story City	Story	Central	Local history	website, operated by the Story City Historical Society, includes the 1903 Queen Anne period Bartlett Museum, pre-Civil War school house and the Carriage House Museum
Swedish American Museum	Swedesburg	Henry	East	Ethnic	Operated by the Swedish Heritage Society, area Swedish heritage
Swensrud School	Northwood	Worth	Central	School	Operated by the Worth County Historical Society, 19th-century period schoolhouse
Tama County Museum	Tama	Tama	East	Local history	website, operated by the Tama County Historical Society
Taylor County Historical Museum	Bedford	Taylor		Local history	website
Taylor#4 School	Marshalltown	Marshall	Central	School	website, operated by the Historical Society of Marshall County by appointment
Terrace Hill	Des Moines	Polk	Central	Historic house	Official residence of the governor of Iowa
Theatre Museum of Repertoire Americana	Mount Pleasant	Henry	East	Theatre	website, memorabilia and artifacts of early repertoire theatre
Todd House	Tabor	Fremont	West	Historic house	Operated by the Tabor Historical Society, mid 19th-century house with exhibits about the town's involvement with the Underground Railroad
Toolesboro Indian Mounds	Toolesboro	Louisa	East	Native American	Operated by the State Historical Society of Iowa, group of Hopewell mounds and education center
Traer Historical Museum	Traer	Tama	Central	Local history	Open by appointment
Trainland U.S.A.	Colfax	Jasper	Central	Railroad	website, Lionel model railroad layouts, trains and accessories
Twombly Museum	Keosauqua	Van Buren	East	Local history	website, operated by the Van Buren County Historical Society for events
Union County Historical Village	Creston	Union		Open air	Includes a schoolhouse, home, general store, printing shop, log cabin, church, blacksmith shop, depot and a museum
Union Pacific Railroad Museum	Council Bluffs	Pottawatamie	West	Railroad	website, exhibits on the Union Pacific Railroad, development of the railroad and the American West
University of Iowa Athletics Hall of Fame	Iowa City	Johnson	Central	Hall of fame	Legendary and influential Iowa Hawkeye sports heroes
University of Iowa Medical Museum	Iowa City	Johnson	Central	Medical	website, located on the 8th floor of the Colloton Pavilion
University of Iowa Stanley Museum of Art	Iowa City	Johnson	Central	Art	Collections include paintings, sculpture, prints, drawings, photographs, ceramics, textiles, jade and silver
University of Iowa Museum of Natural History	Iowa City	Johnson	Central	Natural history	Includes birds, mammals, and Native American artifacts
University of Northern Iowa Gallery of Art	Cedar Falls	Black Hawk	East	Art	Collection includes American and European art
University of Northern Iowa Museum	Cedar Falls	Black Hawk	East	Natural history	website, exhibits on geology, biology, history, anthropology at the Rod Library
Ushers Ferry Historic Village	Cedar Rapids	Linn	East	Living	website, 1908 historic village
Van Buren Historical Society Museum	Keosauqua	Van Buren	East	Local history	website, located in the historic Twombly Building
Vander Haag's Yesterday's Memories	Sanborn	O'Brien	West	History	Open by appointment, historic cars, trucks, tools, toys, dresses, household items
Vermeer Museum	Pella	Marion	Central	Technology	website, history of the Vermeer Company, manufacturer of agricultural, environmental and construction equipment
Vernon Schoolhouse #5	Dows	Wright	Central	School	Operated by the Dows Historical Society, open by appointment
Vesterheim Norwegian-American Museum	Decorah	Winneshiek	East	Cultural	
Victorian Home and Carriage House Museum	Cedar Falls	Black Hawk	East	Historic house	Operated by the Cedar Falls Historical Society, late 19th century Victorian home and museum of local history, includes Lenoir Model Railroad Collection
Victorian Museum on Main	Emmetsburg	Palo Alto	West	Historic house	Victorian period house
Villisca Axe Murder House	Villisca	Montgomery	West	Multiple	Historic Josiah B. and Sara Moore House where several people were murdered in 1912
Voas Nature Area & Museum	Minburn	Dallas	Central	Natural history	website, 705-acre park with museum of rocks, fossils and minerals
Wabash Depot Museum	Moravia	Appanoose	South	Railroad	Includes railroad artifacts, an operational model train layout and a restored railroad section car
Wagaman Mill	Lynnville	Jasper	Central	Mill	website, operated by the Lynnville Historical Society
Waldemar A. Schmidt Art Gallery	Waverly	Bremer	East	Art	website, part of the Bachman Fine Arts Center at Wartburg College
Wallace House Museum	Des Moines	Polk	Central	Biographical	Life of the Wallace Family, farm leaders
Walnut Grove Pioneer Village	Long Grove	Scott	East	Open air	1860s village with 18 historic buildings
Wapello County Historical Museum	Ottumwa	Wapello	Central	Local history	website, operated by the Wapello County Historical Society
Wapsipinicon Mill	Independence	Buchanan	Central	Mill	Operated by the Buchanan County Historical Society, 1870s grist mill and artifacts
Waterloo Center for the Arts	Waterloo	Black Hawk	East	Art	website
Watson's Grocery Store Museum	State Center	Marshall	Central	History	Period grocery store
Wayland & Midwest Memories Museums	Wayland	Henry	East	Local history	website
West Bend Historical Museum	West Bend	Palo Alto	West	Local history	
Western Historic Trails Center	Council Bluffs	Pottawatamie	West	History	website, operated by the State Historical Society of Iowa, exhibits about four western expansion trails: Lewis & Clark, Mormon Pioneer, California and Oregon
Westport Rural School Museum	Okoboji	Dickinson	West	School	One room schoolhouse
Wilder Memorial Museum	Strawberry Point	Delaware	East	Commodity	website, includes over 800 dolls, 40 Victorian lamps, European figurines, farm tools, toy tractors
Winfield Historical Society Museum	Winfield	Henry	East	Local history	website
Wisecup's Farm Museum	Missouri Valley	Harrison	West	Agriculture	website, antique farm equipment, tractors, tools, transportation
Witter Gallery	Storm Lake	Buena Vista	West	Art	website
Worth County Machinery Museum	Northwood	Worth	Central	Agriculture	Operated by the Worth County Historical Society, farming machinery and equipment, open by appointment
Worth County Museum	Northwoo	Worth	Central	Local history	Operated by the Worth County Historical Society, local history exhibits and late 19th century period room displays
Young House Museum	Bellevue	Jackson	East	Historic house	Turn-of-the-20th-century period house
Buchanan County Historical Society	Independence	Buchanan County	East	County wide history	https://www.buchanancountyhistory.com/
Buchanan County Genealogical Society	Independence	Buchanan County	East	County wide history & family genealogy	https://www.buchanancountyhistory.com/genealogical-society/

== Defunct museums ==
- Bluedorn Science Imaginarium, Waterloo, formerly operated by the Grout Museum, closed in 2025.
- George Wyth House, Cedar Falls, formerly operated by the Cedar Falls Historical Society, sold in 2014
- Hometown Perry, Iowa, Perry, Iowa, closed December 31, 2007 website
- Linn-Olson Museum, Villisca, contents auctioned off in 2012
- Minerville Country Village, Donnellson
- Museum of Religious Arts, Logan, closed in 2016
- Science Center, Cedar Rapids, closed in 2015
- Schield International Museum, Waverly, closed in 2009

== See also ==
- Museums list
- List of historical societies in Iowa
- List of nature centers in Iowa

== Resources ==
- Iowa Museum Association
- Historic House Museums in Iowa
- Historical Museums in Iowa
