= Kellow =

Kellow is a surname of British origin; it may be from a Cornish place called Kellow; or in some cases from places called Kelloe in County Durham or Berwickshire. It may refer to:

- Alison Kellow, Australian botanist
- Brian Kellow (1959–2018), American biographer and magazine editor
- Corey Kellow (born 2001) is a New Zealand rugby union player
- Geoffrey Kellow, Australian philatelist
- Henry Kellow (1881–1935), Australian literary critic, author and teacher
- Tony Kellow (1952–2011), an English professional footballer

== See also ==
- Kellow Chesney (1914–2004), journalist
- Kellow House, historic building in Cresco, Iowa
