= List of historical societies in Iowa =

The following is a list of historical societies in the state of Iowa, United States.

== Organizations ==
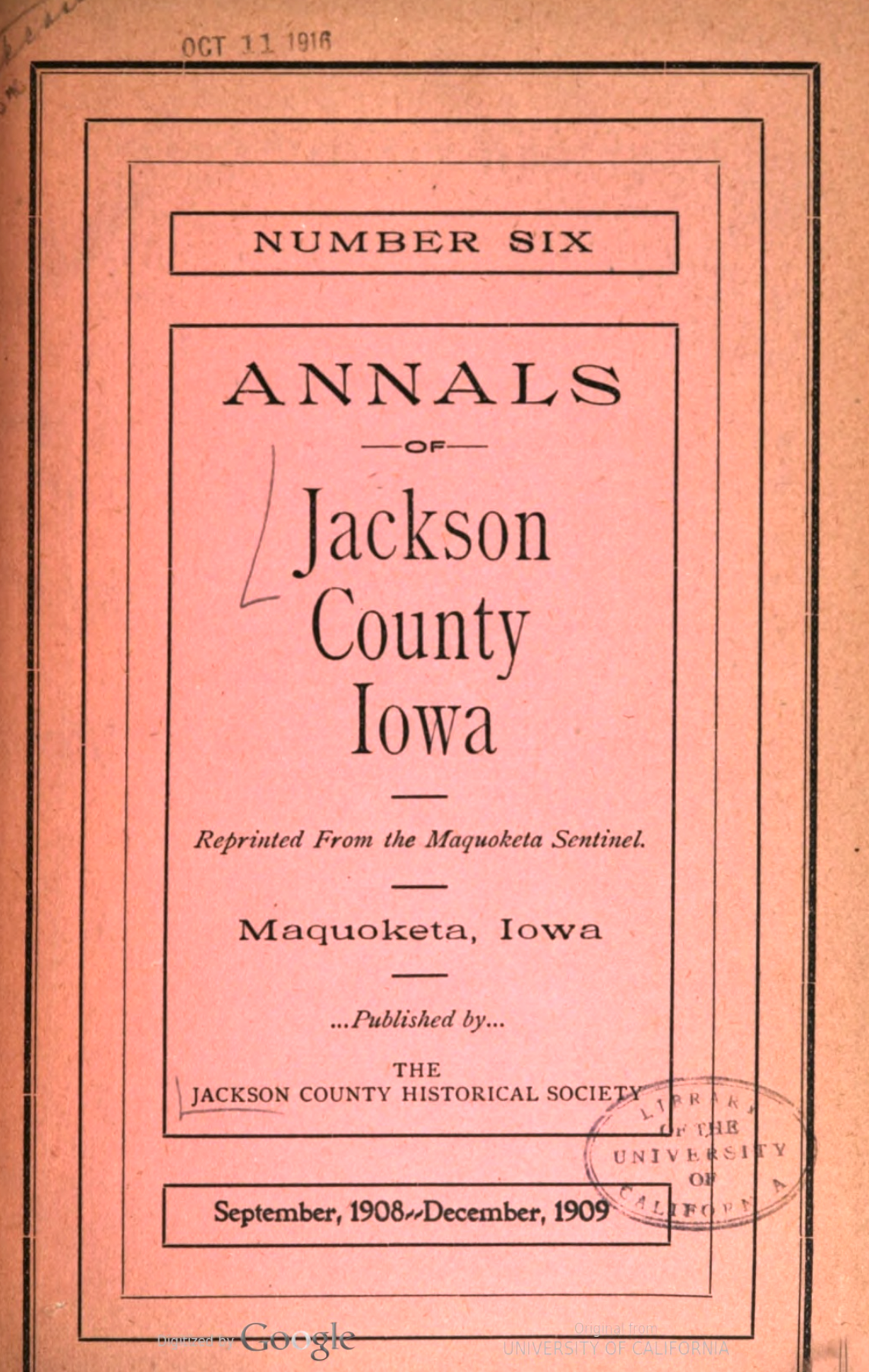
Cover of the Annals of Jackson County, Iowa number 6, 1908-1909, published by the Jackson County Historical Society, Iowa

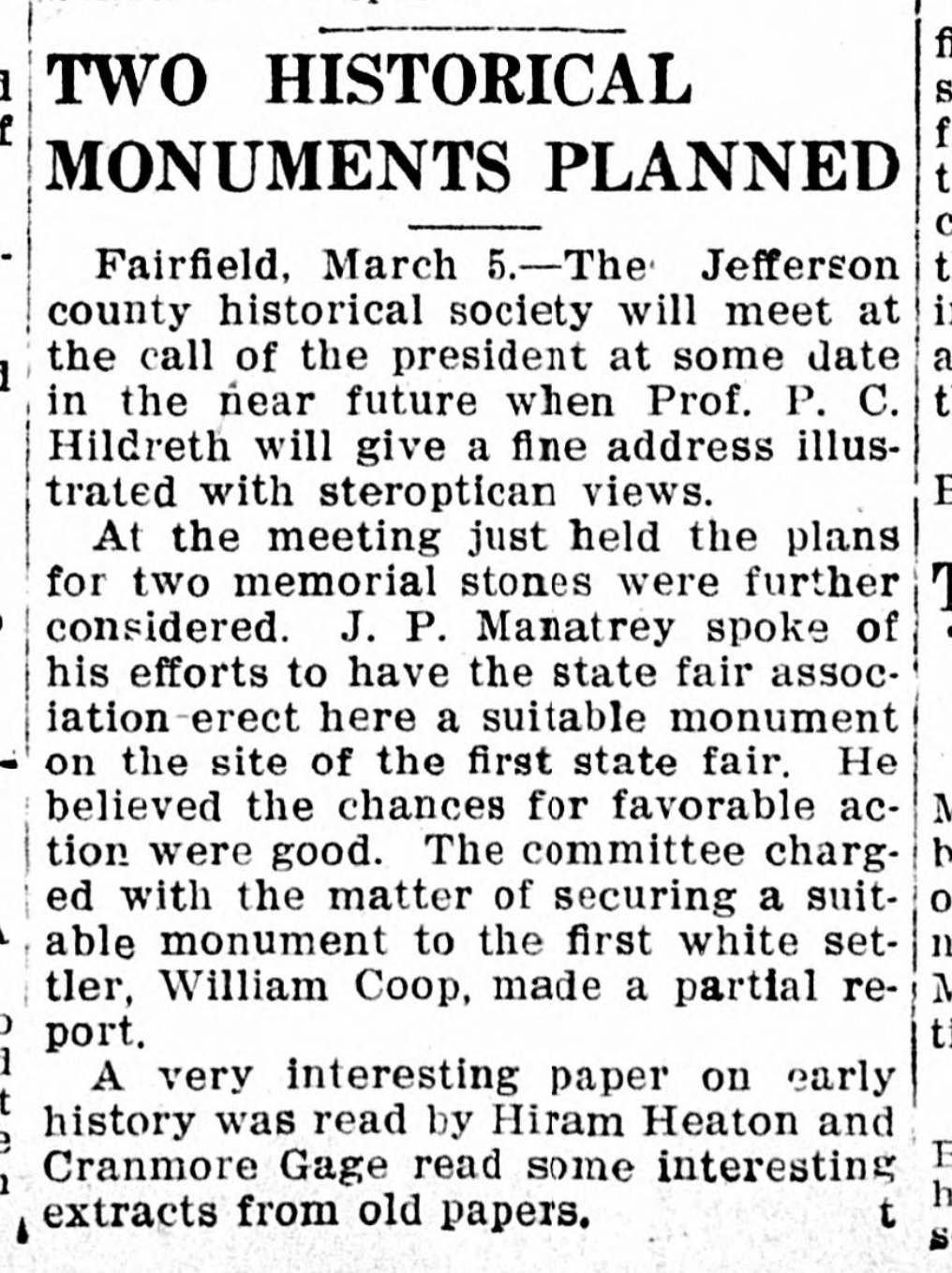
1914 newspaper item about the Jefferson County Historical Society, Iowa

- Adair County Historical Society
- Alburnett Community Historical Society
- Amana Heritage Society
- Ames Historical Society
- Benton County Historical Society
- Cedar County Historical Society
- Cedar Falls Historical Society
- Center Point Historical Society
- Central City Historical Society
- Cerro Gordo County Historical Society
- Coggon Historical Society
- Decatur County Historical Society
- Des Moines County Historical Society
- Dubuque County Historical Society (owns the National Mississippi River Museum & Aquarium)
- Ely Community History Society
- Floyd County Historical Society
- Hamilton County Historical Society
- Historical Society of Henry County
- Howard County Historical Society
- Jackson County Historical Society
- Jasper County Historical Society
- Jefferson County Historical Society
- Johnson County Historical Society
- Kalona Historical Society
- Historical Society of Linn County
- Lucas County Historical Society
- Madison County Historical Society
- Mahaska County Historical Society
- Marion County Historical Society
- Marshall County Historical Society
- Massena Historical Society
- Mitchell County Historical Society
- Montgomery County Historical Society
- O'Brien County Historical Society
- Osceola County Historical Society
- Pella Historical Society
- Plymouth County Historical Society
- Pocahontas County Historical Society
- Polk County Historical Society
- Pottawattamie County Historical Society
- Ringgold County Historical Society
- Smithland Historical Society
- Springville Area Historical Society
- State Historical Society of Iowa
- Tabor Historical Society
- Tama County Historical Society
- Troy Mills Historical Society
- Union County Historical Society
- Walker Historical Society
- Warren County Historical Society
- Wayne County Historical Society
- Historical Society of Webster County
- West Des Moines Historical Society

== See also ==
- History of Iowa
- List of museums in Iowa
- National Register of Historic Places listings in Iowa
- List of historical societies in the United States
