= List of nature centers in Iowa =

This is a list of nature centers and environmental education centers in the state of Iowa.

To use the sortable tables: click on the icons at the top of each column to sort that column in alphabetical order; click again for reverse alphabetical order.

Name	Location	County	Region	Summary
Anderson Conservation Area	Red Oak	Montgomery	Southwest	website, operated by the City of Red Oak, 244 acres, 2 miles of trails, 15 acre pond, includes Wolfe Nature Center with environmental education displays and a meeting room
Annett Nature Center	Indianola	Warren	South Central	website, 160 acres, operated by the Warren County Conservation Board
Appanoose County Conservation Board Nature Center	Centerville	Appanoose	South Central	Operated by the County in 144-acre Sharon Bluffs State Park
Bailey's Ford Park	Manchester	Delaware	Northeast	website, 105 acres, includes a nature center, operated by the Delaware County Conservation Board
Benton County Nature Center	Vinton	Benton	Southeast	website, operated by the Benton County Conservation Board in 187-acre Rogers Park
Calkins Nature Area	Iowa Falls	Hardin	North Central	website, 76 acres, operated by Hardin County Conservation, includes the Calkins Interpretive Center with Native American and natural history artifacts
Conard Environmental Research Area	Kellogg	Jasper	South Central	Operated by Grinnell College, 365-acre facility for class use in the study of ecology and student and faculty research, summer camp
DeSoto National Wildlife Refuge	Missouri Valley	Harrison	Western	8,362-acre refuge (46% in Iowa, 54% in Nebraska), visitor center exhibits, education programs
Dickinson County Nature Center	Okoboji	Dickinson	Northwest	website, operated by the Dickinson County Conservation Board, located in 60-acre Kenue Park
Dorothy Pecaut Nature Center	Sioux City	Woodbury	Northwest	Located in Stone State Park, managed by the Woodbury County Conservation Board, features interactive prairie, wetland & woodland exhibits, live native animals, bird viewing area, butterfly and wildflower gardens
E.B. Lyons Nature Center	Dubuque	Dubuque	Northeast	Located in the 1380-acre Mines of Spain Recreation Area, exhibits on the history and features of the park, bird and butterfly garden, native prairies, woodland flower gardens, hiking trails, historic Junkerman farm site
Eden Valley Nature Center	Baldwin	Jackson	Northwest	website, located in 201-acre Eden Valley Refuge, includes live snakes, a wildlife diorama, rock collection and taxidermy displays
Fontana Interpretive Nature Center	Hazleton	Buchanan	Northwest	website, operated by the Buchanan County Conservation Board in 134-acre Fontana Park, includes nature exhibits, outdoor live native wildlife on display
Fossil & Prairie Center	Rockford	Floyd	North Central	website, operated by the Fossil & Prairie Conservation Foundation, center open seasonally, park open year-round, fossils can be found in the former quarry site
Gilbertson Conservation Education Area	Elgin	Fayette	Northeast	website, includes the Gilbertson Nature Center, 345 acre park, petting zoo, late 19th century period farm house, farm tool and antiques displays
Grimes Farm	Marshalltown	Marshall	South Central	website, over 160 acres, operated by the Friends of Grimes Farm
Hartman Reserve Nature Center	Cedar Falls	Black Hawk	Northeast	300 acre reserve, over 6 miles of trails, an entity of the Black Hawk County Conservation Board
Heery Woods Nature Center	Clarksville	Butler	North Central	website, operated by the Butler County Conservation Board, exhibits on area natural and cultural history
Hitchcock Nature Center	Honey Creek	Pottawattamie	Southwest	website, operated by the Pottawattamie County Conservation Board, located on 1,268 acres
Hurstville Interpretive Center	Maquoketa	Jackson	Northeast	website, operated by Jackson County Conservation, features restored prairie and 18 acre wetland, wetland and prairie dioramas, exhibits about Iowa's mussels, rocks, endangered species, birds of prey and migrating songbirds
Indian Creek Nature Center	Cedar Rapids	Linn	Southeast	website, Iowa's only private nature center with over 400 acres, 7 miles of trails, year-round public and private educational programs, and sustainable living exhibits. Home of a Nature Explore certified outdoor classroom, titled "Sense of Wonder Trail"
Jefferson County Park	Fairfield	Jefferson	Southeast	website, operated by the Jefferson County Conservation Board, 190 acres, nature center displays include Indian artifacts, Iowa mammals fur collection, a 150-gallon fish aquarium and a turtle tank
Johnson County Conservation Education Center	Tiffin	Johnson	Southeast	website, operated by the Johnson County Conservation Department in 1,082-acre F.W. Kent Park, 27-acre lake
Jones County Nature Center	Center Junction	Jones	Northwest	website, located in 217-acre Central Park
Kennedy Park Reception & Nature Center	Fort Dodge	Webster	North Central	website, located in 400-acre John F. Kennedy Memorial Park, operated by the Webster County Conservation Board
Kuehn Conservation Area	Earlham	Dallas	South Central	Operated by the Dallas County Conservation Board, 600 acre preserve, includes Bear Creek Nature Center, open by appointment
Lake Meyer Nature Center	Fort Atkinson	Winneshiek	Northeast	website, operated by the Winneshiek County Conservation Board, adjacent to 160-acre Lake Meyer Park
Lime Creek Nature Center	Mason City	Cerro Gordo	North Central	website, partnered with the Cerro Gordo County Conservation Board, includes live animals
Lost Island Nature Center	Ruthven	Palo Alto	Northwest	website, operated by the Palo Alto County Conservation Board on 1,200-acre Lost Island Lake
Macbride Nature Recreation Area	Solon	Johnson	Southeast	website, 485 acres, operated by the University of Iowa, includes the School of the Wild, Wildlife Camps, and Macbride Raptor Project
Mahaska County Conservation Center	New Sharon	Mahaska	South Central	website, operated by the Mahaska County Conservation Board, located at the 220-acre Russell Wildlife Area, features live animal displays, hands-on activities, interactive dioramas of Iowa's forest, prairie, and wetland ecosystems, fossils
Mitchell County Conservation Nature Center	Osage	Mitchell	North Central	website, operated by the Mitchell County Conservation Board in the L.R. Falk Wildlife Area, over 250 acres
Muscatine County Environmental Learning Center	Muscatine	Muscatine	Southeast	website, operated by the Muscatine County Conservation Board in the 85-acre Discovery Park, includes live animals, interactive natural history exhibits, outdoor live raptor enclosure
Nature Encounter Center at Willow Lake Recreation Area	Woodbine	Harrison	Southwest	website, operated by the Harrison County Conservation Board, 220 acres
Neal Moeller Environmental Education Center	Denison	Crawford	Southwest	website, operated by the Crawford County Conservation Board at 359-acre Yellow Smoke Park
Oakland Mills Nature Center	Mt. Pleasant	Henry	Southeast	website, operated by the Henry County Conservation Board in Oakland Mills County Park, includes outdoor displays of live native wildlife
Osborne Visitor, Welcome and Nature Center	Elkader	Clayton	Northeast	website, operated by the Clayton County Conservation Board in Osborne Park, features over 200 acres, historic 2 ½ story hotel, blacksmith shop, general store, grain elevator and railroad depot
Pioneer Ridge Nature Area	Ottumwa	Wapello	Southeast	website, 995 acres, operated by the Wapello County Conservation Board
Pocahontas County Conservation Board Nature Center	Pocahontas	Pocahontas	Northwest	website, operated by the Pocahontas County Conservation Board
Prairie Learning Center	Prairie City	Jasper	South Central	Museum and education center for the 8,654-acre Neal Smith National Wildlife Refuge
Prairie's Edge Nature Center	Cresco	Howard	Northeast	information, operated by Howard County Conservation, includes live animals
Soaring Eagles Nature Center	Clinton	Clinton	Southeast	website, over 2 miles of trails, restored prairie area, one room schoolhouse, located in a 1938 barn, exhibits about the land’s homesteading history and natural history
South Bluff Nature Center - Bellevue State Park	Bellevue	Jackson	Northeast	Displays on the plants, animals and geology of 770-acre Bellevue State Park
Starr's Cave Nature Center	Burlington	Des Moines	Southeast	website, operated by Des Moines County Conservation in 184-acre Starr's Cave Park and Preserve
Story County Conservation Center	Ames	Story	South Central	website, located in 200-acre McFarland Park
Swiss Valley Preserve Center	Peosta	Dubuque	Northeast	website, 476 acres, operated by the Dubuque County Conservation Board
Tama County Nature Center	Toledo	Tama	South Central	website, operated by Tama County Conservation in 277-acre Otter Creek Lake and Park
Voas Nature Area & Museum	Minburn	Dallas	South Central	website, operated by the Dallas County Conservation Board, 372 acre park, exhibits of rocks, fossils, and minerals across the United States and around the world
Wapsi River Environmental Education Center	Dixon	Scott	Southeast	website, 225 acres, managed and operated by Scott County Conservation with programming assistance from Clinton County Conservation
Washington County Conservation Education Center	Ainsworth	Washington	Southeast	website, operated by the Washington County Conservation Board in 125-acre Marr Park
Water’s Edge Nature Center	Algona	Kossuth	North Central	website, 124 acres, operated by the Kossuth County Conservation Board on 54-acre Smith's Lake, includes aquariums
Wickiup Hill Outdoor Learning Center	Toddville	Linn	Northeast	website, operated by the Linn County Conservation Board in the 790-acre Wickiup Hill Natural Area
Wildwood Nature Center	Fayette	Fayette	Northeast	website, operated by the Fayette County Conservation Board, 7 acres, features live Iowa mammals and birds of prey, nature displays and mounted native animals and birds
