= Samuel Freeman Miller =

US Supreme Court justice from 1862 to 1890

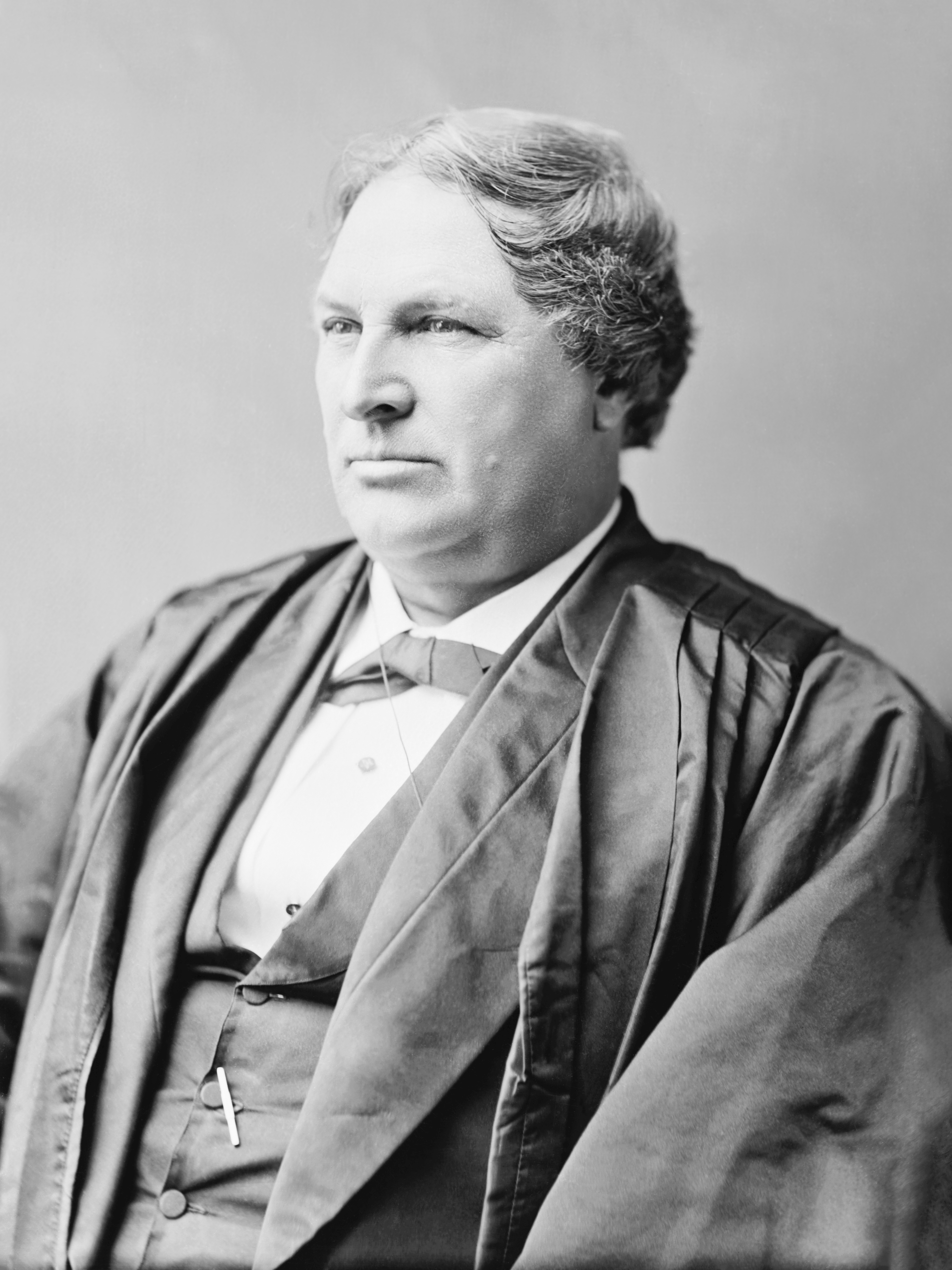
- Samuel Freeman Miller, by Mathew Brady, c. 1865-75

Associate Justice of the Supreme Court of the United States
- In office July 21, 1862 – October 13, 1890
- Nominated by: Abraham Lincoln
- Preceded by: Peter V. Daniel
- Succeeded by: Henry Billings Brown

Personal details
- Born: April 5, 1816 Richmond, Kentucky, U.S.
- Died: October 13, 1890 (aged 74) Washington, D.C., U.S.
- Party: Whig (Before 1854); Republican (1854–1890)
- Education: Transylvania University (MD)

Samuel Freeman Miller (April 5, 1816 – October 13, 1890) was an American lawyer and physician who served as an associate justice of the U.S. Supreme Court from 1862 until his death in 1890 and who authored landmark opinions in United States v. Kagama and The Slaughterhouse Cases.

== Early life, education, and medical career ==
Born in Richmond, Kentucky, Miller was the son of yeoman farmer Frederick Miller and his wife Patsy. He earned a medical degree in 1838 from Transylvania University in Lexington, Kentucky. While practicing medicine for a decade in Barbourville, Kentucky, he taught himself the law and was admitted to the bar in 1847. Favoring the abolition of slavery, which was prevalent in Kentucky, he supported the Whigs in Kentucky.

== Career ==
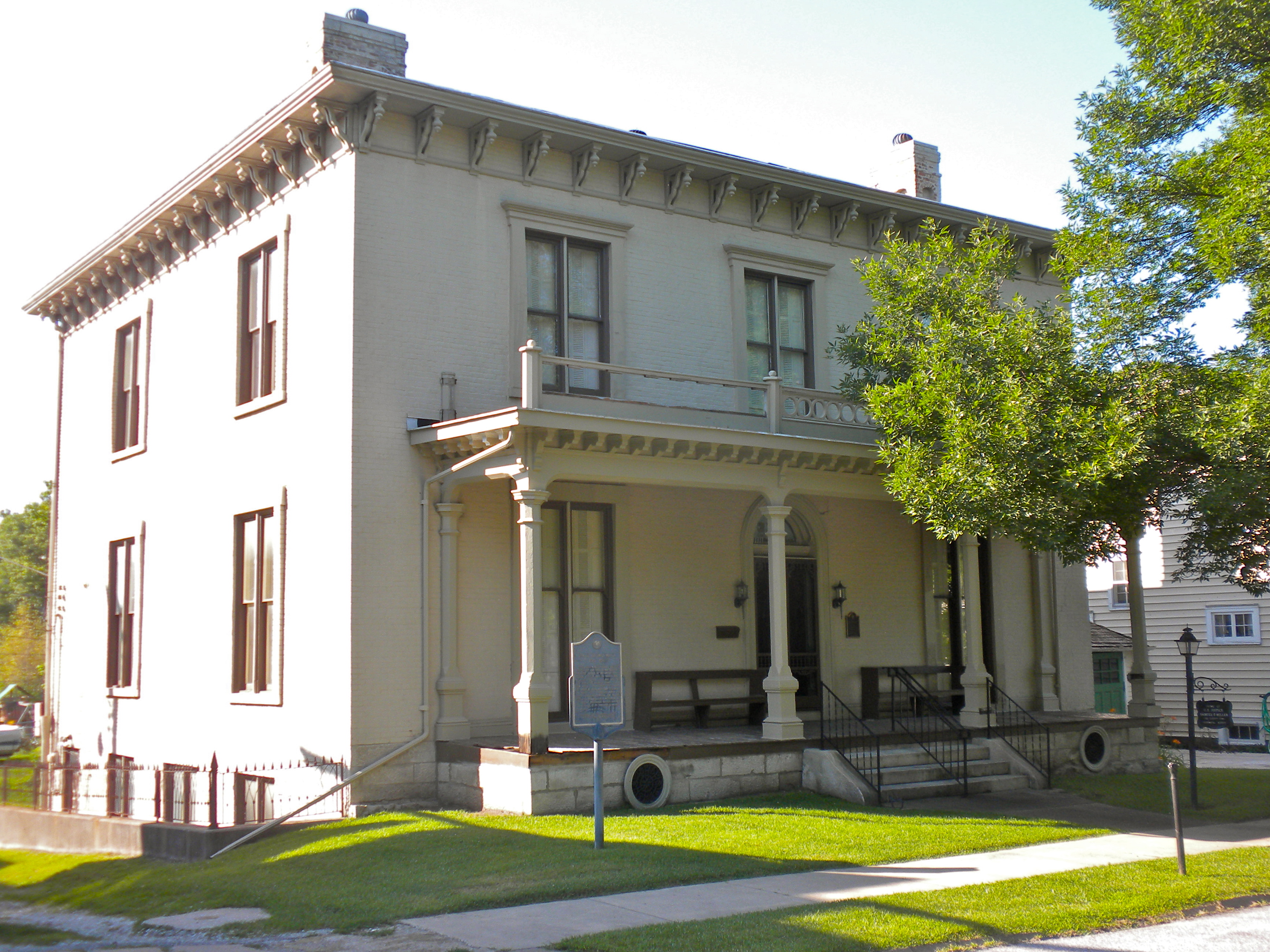
Miller's house in Keokuk

In 1850, Miller moved to Keokuk, Iowa, which was a state more amenable to his views on slavery, and he immediately freed his few slaves who had come with his family from Kentucky. Active in Iowa politics, he supported Abraham Lincoln in the 1860 election. Lincoln nominated Miller to the Supreme Court on July 16, 1862. He was confirmed by the U.S. Senate that same day, and was sworn into office on July 21.

His opinions strongly favored Lincoln's positions, and he upheld his wartime suspension of habeas corpus and trials by military commission. After the war, his narrow reading of the Fourteenth Amendment—he wrote the opinion in the 1873 Slaughterhouse Cases—limited the effectiveness of the amendment. Miller wrote the majority opinion in Bradwell v. Illinois, which held that the right to practice law was not constitutionally protected under the Privileges or Immunities Clause of the Fourteenth Amendment.

He later joined the majority opinions in United States v. Cruikshank and the Civil Rights Cases, holding that the amendment did not give the U.S. government the power to stop private—as opposed to state-sponsored—discrimination against blacks. In Ex parte Yarbrough, 110 U.S. 651 (1884), however, Miller held that the federal government had broad authority to act to protect black voters from violence by the Ku Klux Klan and other private groups. Miller also supported the use of broad federal power under the Commerce Clause to override state regulations, as in Wabash v. Illinois.

Justice Miller wrote 616 opinions in his 28 years on the Court; Justice Field (whose 34-year tenure mostly overlapped Miller's) wrote 544 opinions; Chief Justice Marshall wrote 508 opinions in his 33 years on the Court, leading future Chief Justice William Rehnquist to describe him as "very likely the dominant figure" on the Court in his time. When Chief Justice Salmon P. Chase died in 1873, attorneys and law journals across the country lobbied for Miller to be appointed to succeed him, but President Ulysses Grant was determined to appoint an outsider; he ultimately chose Morrison Waite. In his tribute to Miller delivered in Portland, Oregon, on October 16, 1890, George Henry Williams stated his support of Miller in detailing his interactions with President Ulysses S. Grant about Chase's replacement.

After the 1876 presidential election between Rutherford Hayes and Samuel Tilden, Miller served on the electoral commission that awarded the disputed electoral votes to the Republican Hayes. In the 1880s, his name was floated as a Republican candidate for president.

In the winter of 1889 and spring of 1890, Justice Miller delivered a series of ten lectures on constitutional law at the National University School of Law in Washington, D.C. They were published posthumously, along with two earlier lectures delivered in 1887.

== Personal life ==
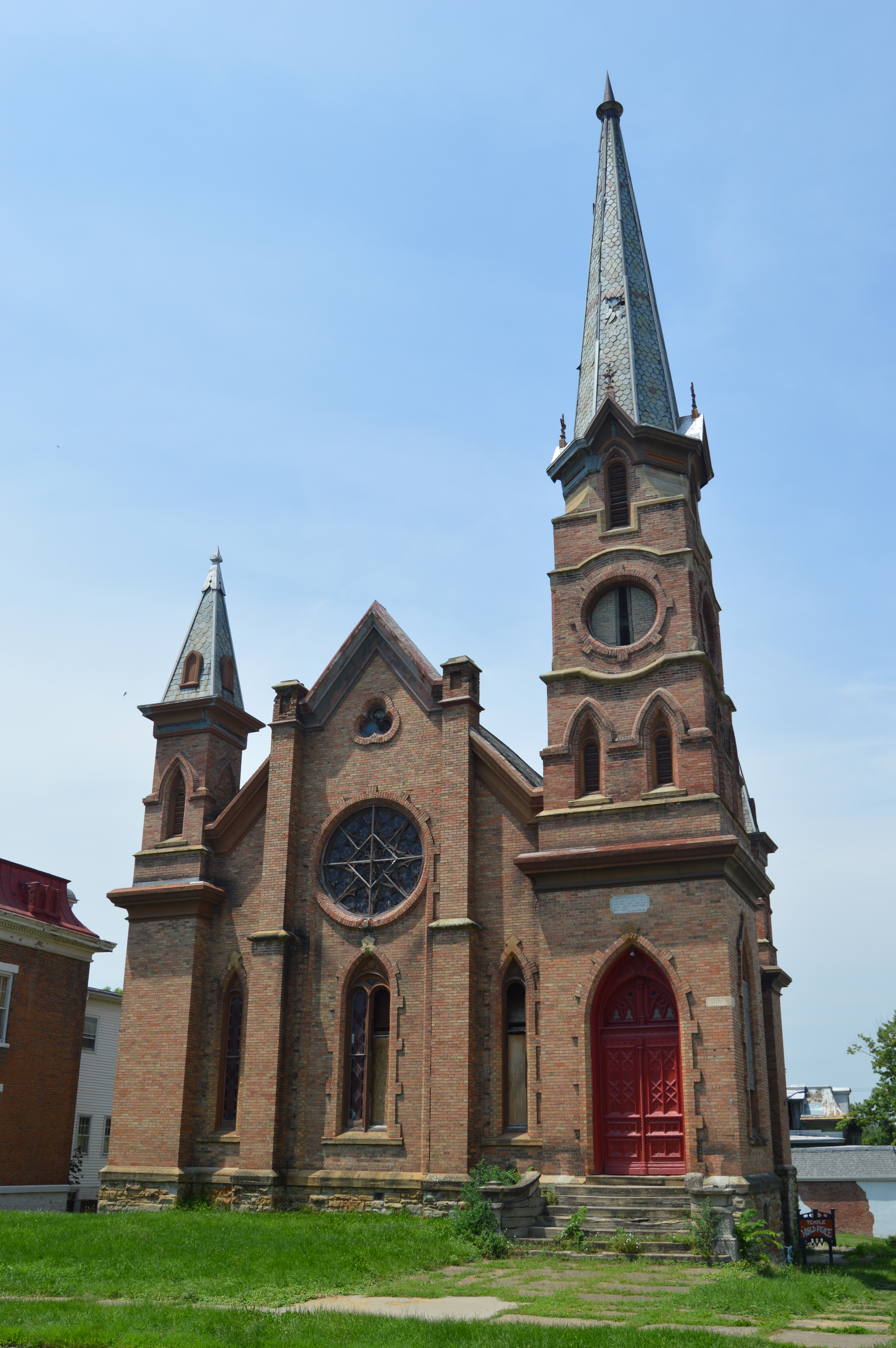
Miller's church in Keokuk

Miller, a religious liberal, belonged to the Unitarian Church and served as President of the Unitarians' National Conference. He died in Washington, D.C., while still a member of the Court. Following his death in 1890, his funeral was held at Keokuk's First Unitarian Church; Miller had been one of the congregation's founders. He is buried at Oakland Cemetery in Keokuk, Iowa.

Miller's first wife was Lucy Love Ballinger Miller (1827 – 1854) whom he married in 1842, and with whom he had three daughters. In 1856, he married Eliza Winter Reeves (1827 – 1900), with whom he had a son and daughter.

== List of most notable opinions ==
- Watson v. Jones, 80 U.S. 679 (1871)
- The Slaughter-House Cases, 83 U.S. 36 (1873)
- Murdock v. Memphis, 87 U.S. 20 Wall. 590 590 (1874)
- United States v. Kagama, 118 U.S. 375 (1886)
- In re Neagle, 135 U.S. 1 (1890)
- In re Burrus, 136 U.S. 586 (1890)

== See also ==
- Justice Samuel Freeman Miller House, listed on the National Register of Historic Places in Iowa
- List of justices of the Supreme Court of the United States
- List of United States federal judges by longevity of service

Legal offices
Preceded by Peter V. Daniel	Associate Justice of the Supreme Court of the United States; 1862–1890	Succeeded by Henry Billings Brown
