= Cedar Falls Ice House =

- U.S. National Register of Historic Places
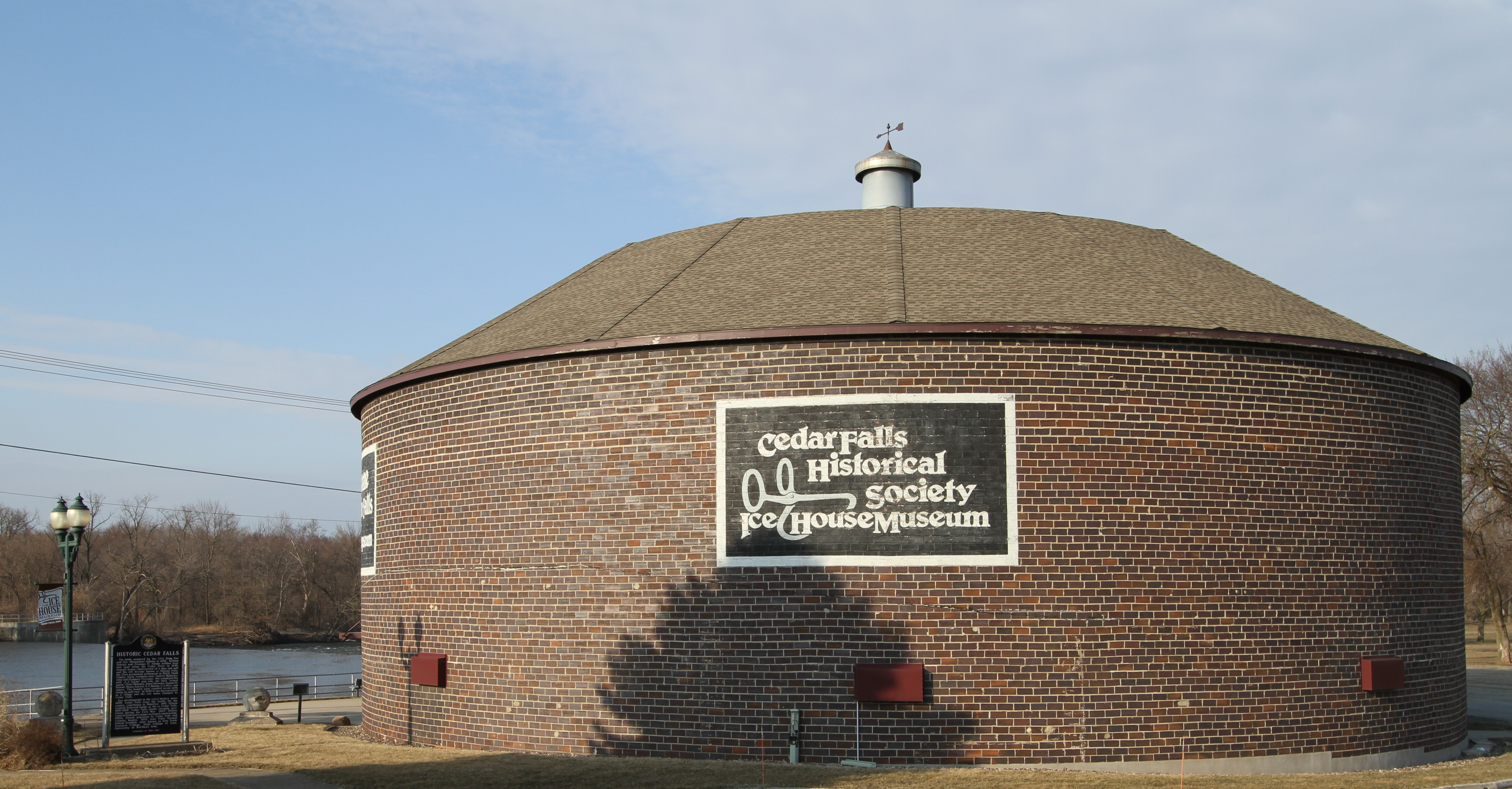

- Location within Iowa Location within the United States
- Location: Franklin Ave. and 1st St. Cedar Falls, Iowa
- Coordinates: 42°32′19″N 92°26′55″W
- Area: less than one acre
- Built: 1921
- Architect: Cedar Falls Construction Co.
- NRHP reference No.: 77000494
- Added to NRHP: October 21, 1977

The Cedar Falls Ice House is a historic building located in Cedar Falls, Iowa, United States. It was built in 1921 and has been listed on the National Register of Historic Places since 1977. The building currently serves as the Ice House Museum.

== History ==
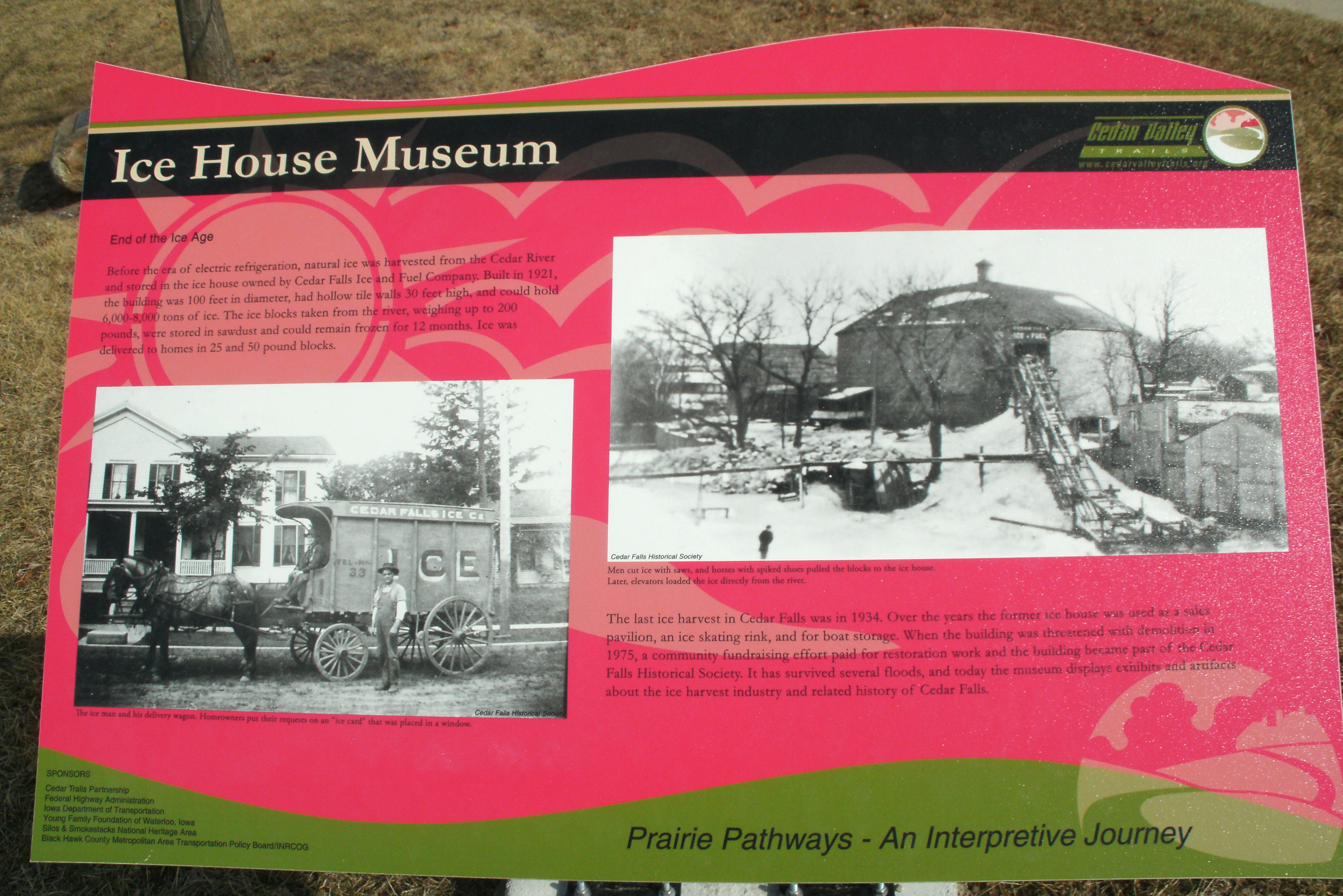
Information plaque located outside of the Ice House

The first ice house in Cedar Falls was built in 1858 near the homestead of William Sturgis, the first permanent resident of Black Hawk County. It was destroyed in a fire on October 22, 1921. Hugh Smith, who owned Cedar Falls Ice and Fuel Company, made plans for the present structure. It was completed in November 1921 by the Cedar Falls Construction Company. The first ice harvest began on January 10, 1922. The building served as an ice house from 1922 until Smith lost his business in 1934. Cedar Falls Trust and Savings Bank took over the building. It was used as a livestock barn and later was flooded for ice skating. In 1938 the city of Cedar Falls purchased the building and leased it to the Cedar Falls Boat Club. They occupied the building until 1976 when the building was condemned. That year the Cedar Falls Historical Society decided to save the structure. After a successful fund-raising campaign the building was renovated beginning in 1978, and the Ice House Museum opened on June 24, 1979. The building was damaged in a 2008 flood.

== Architecture ==
The building is a true round barn structure that measures 100 feet (30 m) in diameter and 30 feet (9.1 m) high. It is constructed of hollow clay tiles and features an aerator and a two-pitch roof. The roof is supported by a center pole and the walls of the structure. When used as an ice house it could hold between 6,000 and 8,000 tons of ice.

== See also ==
- List of ice companies
