= Higgins Museum of National Bank Notes =

- Established: 1978
- Location: 1507 Sanborn Avenue; Okoboji, Iowa, United States
- Coordinates: 43°22′54″N 95°8′10″W
- Type: Currency museum
- Website: thehigginsmuseum.org

The Higgins Museum of National Bank Notes is a museum of national bank notes in Okoboji, Iowa. The museum was founded in 1978 by William R. Higgins, Jr.

== Collections ==
The museum has collections of national bank notes from Iowa, Minnesota, and Missouri, and objects such as a bank teller cage, safes, and a spider printing press on loan from the Bureau of Engraving and Printing.
