= Geoffrey Kellow =

Australian philatelist

- Born: Geoffrey Neil Kellow
- Occupation: Philatelist

Geoffrey Neil Kellow is an Australian philatelist who signed the Roll of Distinguished Philatelists in 2009.
