= National Bank Note =

Retired US currency banknotes

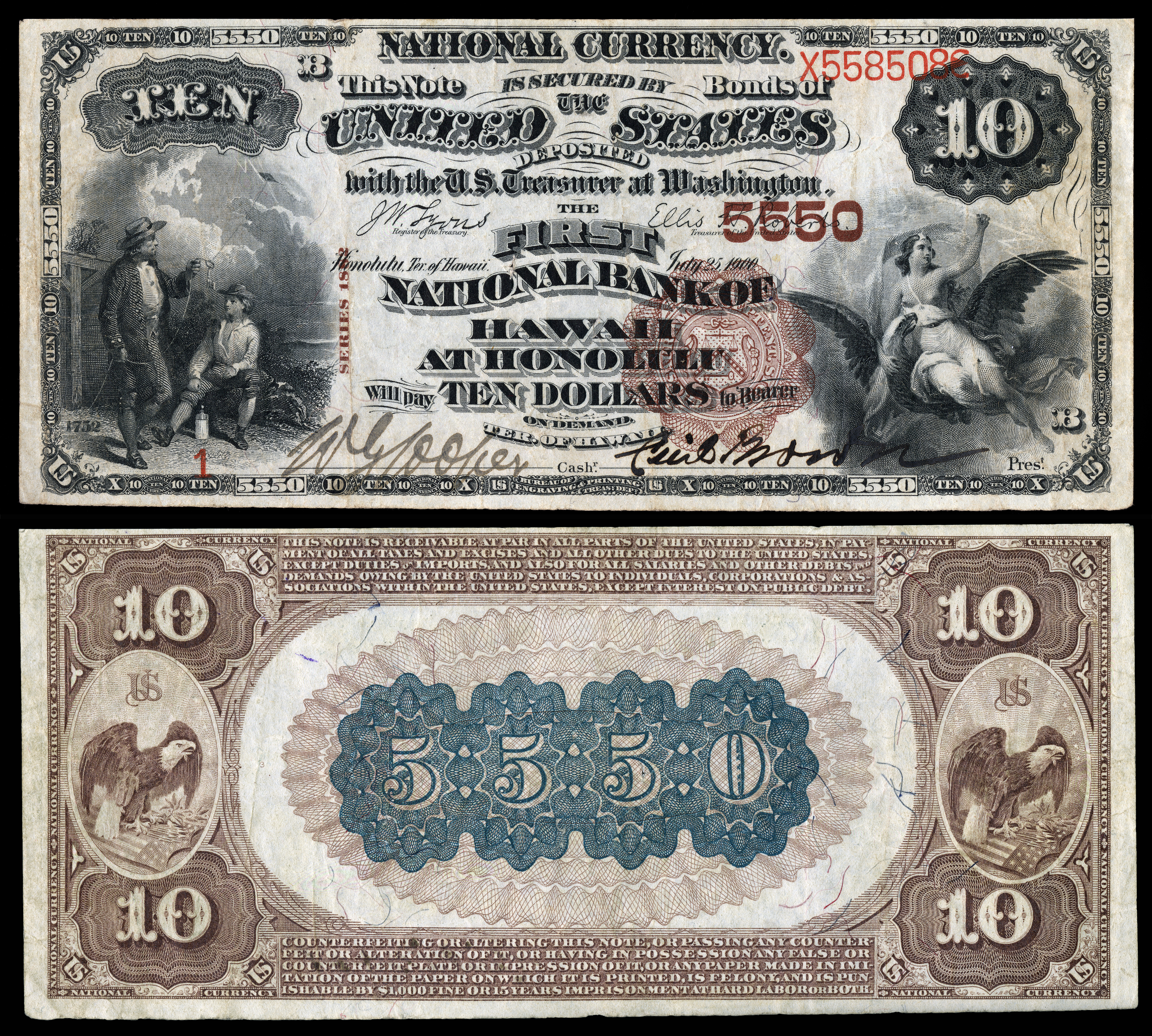
The first $10 National Bank Note issued by The First National Bank of Hawaii at Honolulu, Territory of Hawaii (1900), signed by Cecil Brown (President) and W.G. Cooper (Cashier). The vignette at left shows Benjamin Franklin conducting the famous Kite experiment. The 5550 in brown ink (and large numerals on the reverse) is the issuing bank's national charter number, also shown in the note's border engraving.

National Bank Notes were United States currency banknotes issued by national banks chartered by the United States Government. The notes were usually backed by United States bonds the bank deposited with the United States Treasury. In addition, banks were required to maintain a redemption fund amounting to five percent of any outstanding note balance, in gold or "lawful money." The notes were not legal tender in general, but were satisfactory for nearly all payments to and by the federal government.

National Bank Notes were retired as a currency type by the U.S. government in the 1930s, when U.S. currency was consolidated into Federal Reserve Notes, United States Notes, and silver certificates.

== Background ==
Prior to the American Civil War, state banks and chartered private banks issued their own banknotes. Privately issued banknotes were nominally backed by specie (hard money) or financial securities held by the banks but oversight of issuing banks often was lax and encouraged wildcat banking, in which fraudulent institutions issued worthless banknotes. During the Civil War, in 1863, the National Banking Act established a system of National Banks which were empowered to issue National Bank Notes subject to federal oversight. The chartering of banks and administrative control over the issuance of National Bank Notes were the responsibility of the Office of the Comptroller of the Currency. A 2 percent tax on state bank notes was authorized in 1864 to speed conversion to the new system, only to be increased the next year to 10 percent, then 20 percent.

== The program ==
From 1863 to 1935, National Bank Notes were issued by banks throughout the country and in US territories. Banks with a federal charter would deposit bonds in the US Treasury. The banks then could issue banknotes worth up to 90 percent of the value of the bonds. The federal government would back the value of the notes—the issuance of which created a demand for the government bonds needed to back them.

The program was a form of monetization of the Federal debt. Bonds eligible as collateral for posting to the Treasury were said to have "circulation privilege" and the interest they bore provided seigniorage to the National Banks.

== The notes ==
Each National Bank Note bore the issuing bank's national charter number as well as the serial number assigned to the note by that bank. Low serial-numbered notes were often withheld as souvenirs by the bank officers who signed them.

=== Large size notes ===
Except for the last few years of issue, all of the National Bank Notes were large-sized.

Through much of their earlier history of issue, national banknotes used designs in which the issuing bank's name was prominently displayed, rather than "The United States Of America". One design used for many years featured a portrait on the obverse, near the left edge, and the bank's name printed in prominent shaded type in the middle. The historical figures seen on these notes usually were different from those on the same denominations of paper currency today.

Large-size notes bore two serial numbers. The Treasury serial number indicated the total number of notes of that series and denomination issued by all banks. The bank serial number indicated the number of notes of that series and denomination issued only by that bank. Large size notes also bore four signatures. Two signatures were those of the Register of the Treasury and Treasurer of the United States and were printed as part of the note's design. The other two signatures were those of the bank's cashier and president, and were individually signed by those officers prior to issuing the note. Notes were sent to the bank by the Treasury and typically signed as uncut sheets, so that the top edge of some notes show the lower part of a signature (such as the descender of a "y" or "j") from the note above it. Notes were often cut apart with scissors, so that the top and bottom edges of notes can be uneven and cut into the borders of the design.

Most, but not all, large size national banknotes showed the charter number of the issuing bank on the obverse. In some cases the charter number was printed once, but typically the charter number appeared twice. The issuing bank's charter number was carefully positioned inside the engraved border, as well as overprinted elsewhere on the obverse. To aid Treasury workers in sorting banknotes, later large size notes also showed a letter to indicate the region of the country in which the issuing bank was located—"N" for New England, "E" for East, "S" for South, "M" for Mid-West, "W" for West, and "P" for Pacific coast.

==== The first issue of National Bank Notes ====
Complete type set (Original and Series 1875, mixed)
Value/series	Bank title	Banknote
$1 Original Series	The First National Bank; Lebanon, Indiana	
$2 Series 1875	The First National Bank; Emporia, Kansas	$2 National Bank Note
$5 Series 1875	The Vineland National Bank; Vineland, New Jersey	
$10 Series 1875	The First National Bank; Bismarck, North Dakota	$10 National Bank Note
$20 Series 1875	The First National Bank; Butte, Montana	$20 National Bank Note
$50 Series 1875	The First National Bank; Cleveland, Ohio	
$100 Original Series	The Raleigh National Bank; Raleigh, North Carolina	$100 National Bank Note
$500 Original Series (Note: Three notes are reported: two in government collections and one in a private collection.)	The Appleton National Bank; Lowell, Massachusetts	$500 National Bank Note
$1,000 Series 1875 (proof) (Note: No issued notes have been reported to exist.)	The First National Bank; Salem, Massachusetts	Proof of a $1,000 National Bank Note

=== Small size notes ===
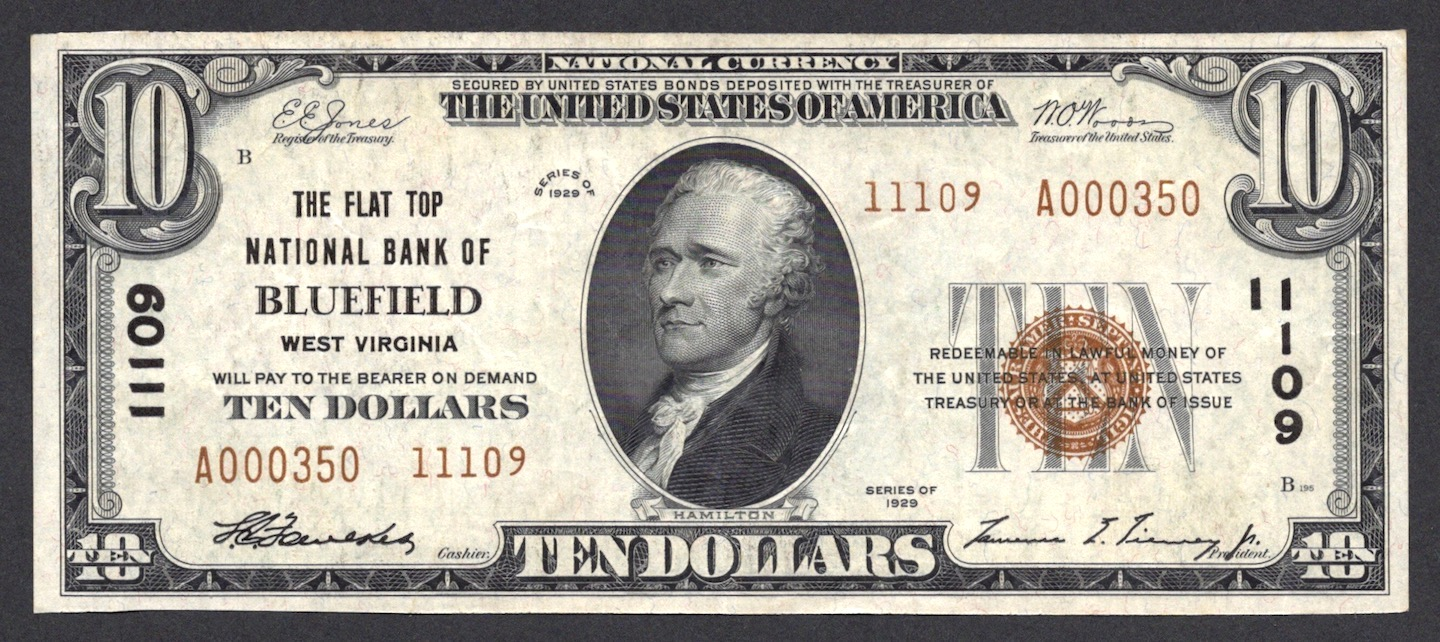
A small-size National Bank Note, series of 1929

With the advent of small-size banknotes came significant design changes for all types of paper currency including National Bank Notes. As a result of the changes, each denomination now had the same portrait and, except for minor variations, the same decorative features that would characterize all types of United States currency from the late 1920s to the early 1990s. In the case of National Bank Notes, the elaborate rendition of the bank's name was omitted from the engraved design with the change to small-size notes, and instead was now simply over-stamped in black ink, just above the engraved lettering of the promise-to-pay. Similarly, the issuing bank's charter number was omitted from the engraved border, and now simply overprinted in dark ink. In the case of the last issues of small size National Bank Notes, referred to as Type 2 notes, the charter number also appeared twice in brown ink in line with the note's serial numbers.

Small size National Bank Notes look very similar to, but are distinctly different from, the emergency 1933 issue of the Federal Reserve Bank Notes. These were printed using National Bank Note plates with slight design changes. Both say "National Currency", but have different issuers.

== End of the program ==
National Bank Notes were retired as a currency type by the U.S. government in the 1930s during the Great Depression as currency in the U.S. was consolidated into Federal Reserve Notes, United States Notes, and silver certificates; privately issued banknotes were eliminated. The passage of the Gold Reserve Act created an accounting gain for the Treasury, part of which was used to provide funds to retire all bonds against which National Banks Notes could be issued.

Sometimes these notes are called "hometown" notes, with their popularity deriving from the wide range of towns and cities that issued them. Among paper money hobbyists, especially in the U.S., these notes are avidly studied and collected. Some were issued in large numbers and remain inexpensive to collectors today. Others associated with rare banks, towns, states and combinations thereof and are quite valuable. A note from Walla Walla, in what was then Washington Territory, sold for $161,000 in a June 2010 sale at Heritage Auctions.

== See also ==
- Higgins Museum of National Bank Notes
