= Community Building (Columbus Junction, Iowa) =

- U.S. National Register of Historic Places
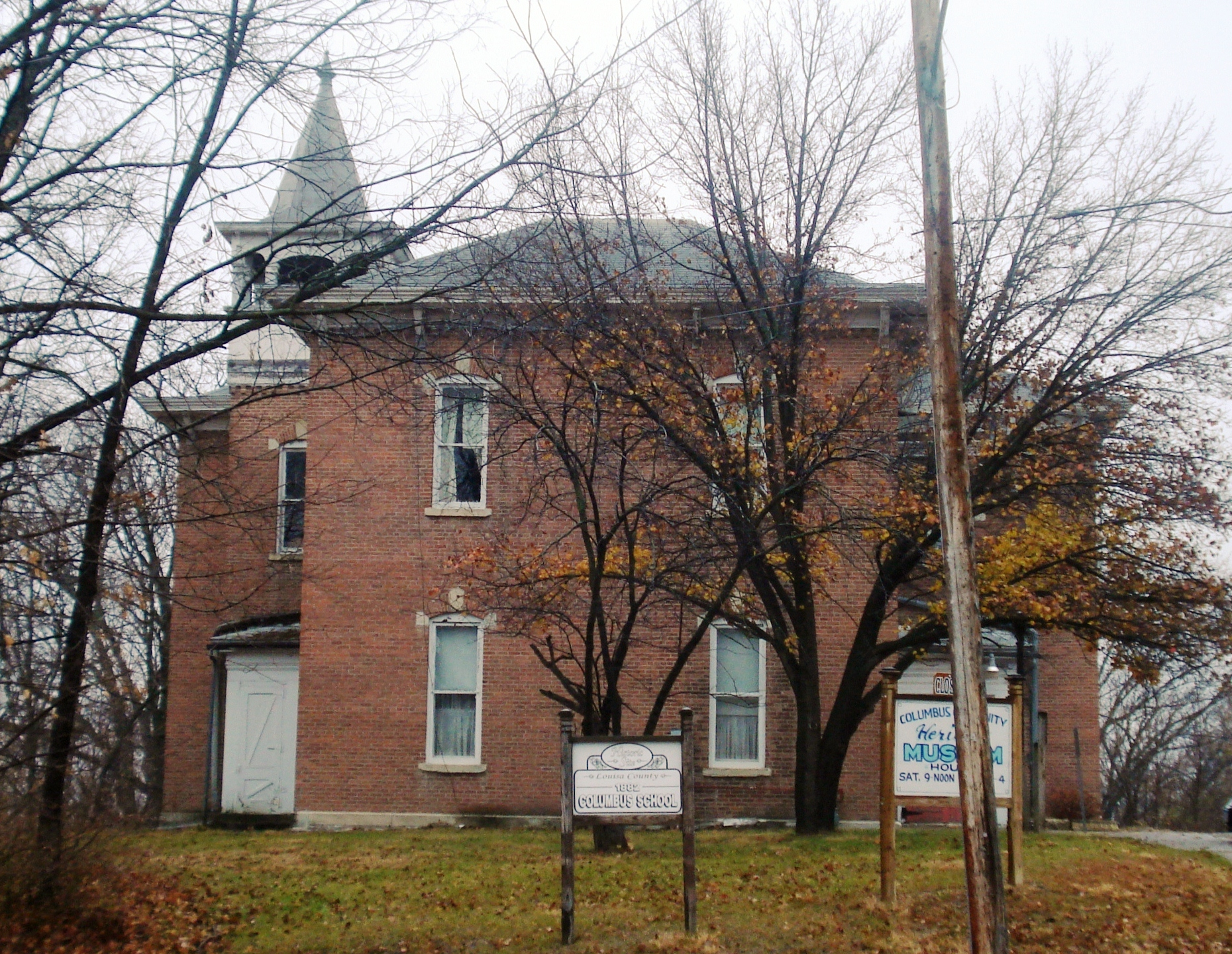

- Location within Iowa Location within the United States
- Location: 122 E. Maple St. Columbus Junction, Iowa
- Coordinates: 41°16′36″N 91°21′37″W
- Area: less than one acre (0.40 ha)
- Built: 1882
- Architectural style: Vernacular
- NRHP reference No.: 73000735
- Added to NRHP: August 14, 1973

The Community Building, also known as Columbus Junction School 1882-1920, is a historic building located in Columbus Junction, Iowa, United States. It houses the Columbus Community Heritage Museum, and it was listed on the National Register of Historic Places in 1973.

The building was constructed as a school and served the function from 1882 to 1920. After being renovated by the Works Progress Administration it served as a gathering place for various community functions. The building was damaged in a fire in the 1960s and the first floor was restored to serve as a library and meeting room. Subsequently, the building has been renovated into a community history museum. The two-story brick structure is basically a large block with a wing on the south side. The entire structure is capped with a hip roof. The Vernacular style building features a prominent belfry, which is a reconstruction. The building's brick exterior appears to be a better quality than what was generally manufactured in Columbus Junction so it is assumed it was imported from elsewhere.
