= Glick–Sower House =

Historic house in Iowa, United States

- U.S. National Register of Historic Places
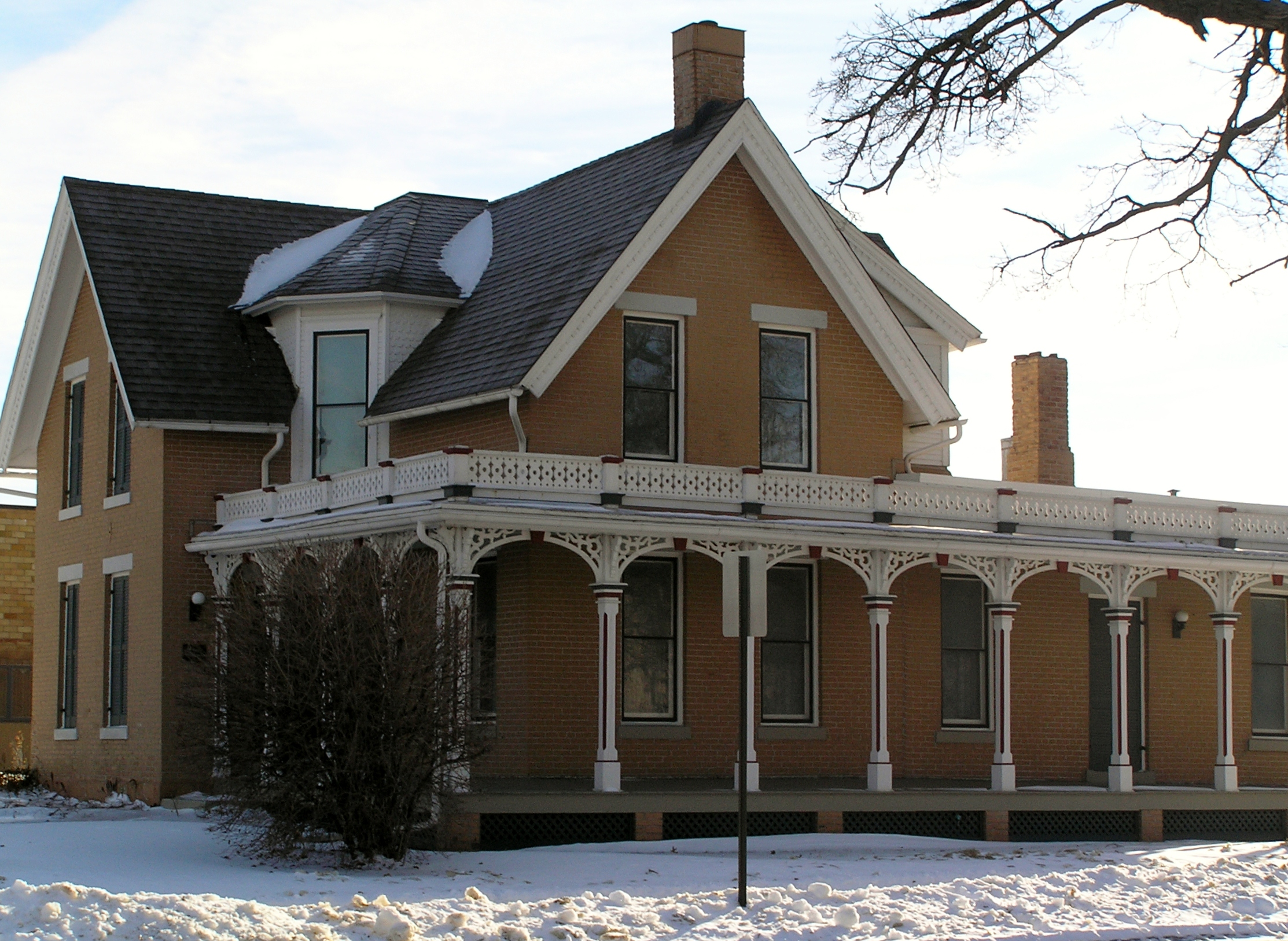

- Location within Iowa Location within the United States
- Location: 201 E. State St. Marshalltown, Iowa
- Coordinates: 42°3′0″N 92°54′33″W
- Built: 1859
- Architectural style: Gothic Revival, Italianate
- NRHP reference No.: 93000331
- Added to NRHP: April 22, 1993

The Glick–Sower House, also known as the Susie Sower House, is located in Marshalltown, Iowa. The house was built in 1859 for Dr. George Glick and has been listed on the National Register of Historic Places since 1993. It is operated as a historic house museum by the Historical Society of Marshall County.

== History ==
Dr. Glick, an early founder and promoter of Marshalltown sold his home to the George Sower family in 1870. George Sower emigrated from Germany in the 1840s and worked in the newspaper business, founding the Marshall Times, now known as the Marshalltown Times Republican. The home was owned by the Sower family until 1952, when Susie Sower willed the estate to the citizens of Marshall County.
