= Cedar Falls Historical Society =

Historical society in Iowa, United States

- Location within Iowa
- Established: June 27, 1962
- Location: 308 West 3rd Street; Cedar Falls, Iowa, United States
- Coordinates: 42.535932°N 92.448637°W
- Type: Historical Society; Museum; Historic house museum Nonprofit organization
- Executive director: Carrie Eilderts
- Website: www.cedarfallshistory.org

The Cedar Falls Historical Society is located in Cedar Falls, Iowa. It strives to preserve the history of Cedar Falls, Black Hawk County and Iowa through its collection and four museums. It is also involved with community outreach, educational programs, guided tours, and research.

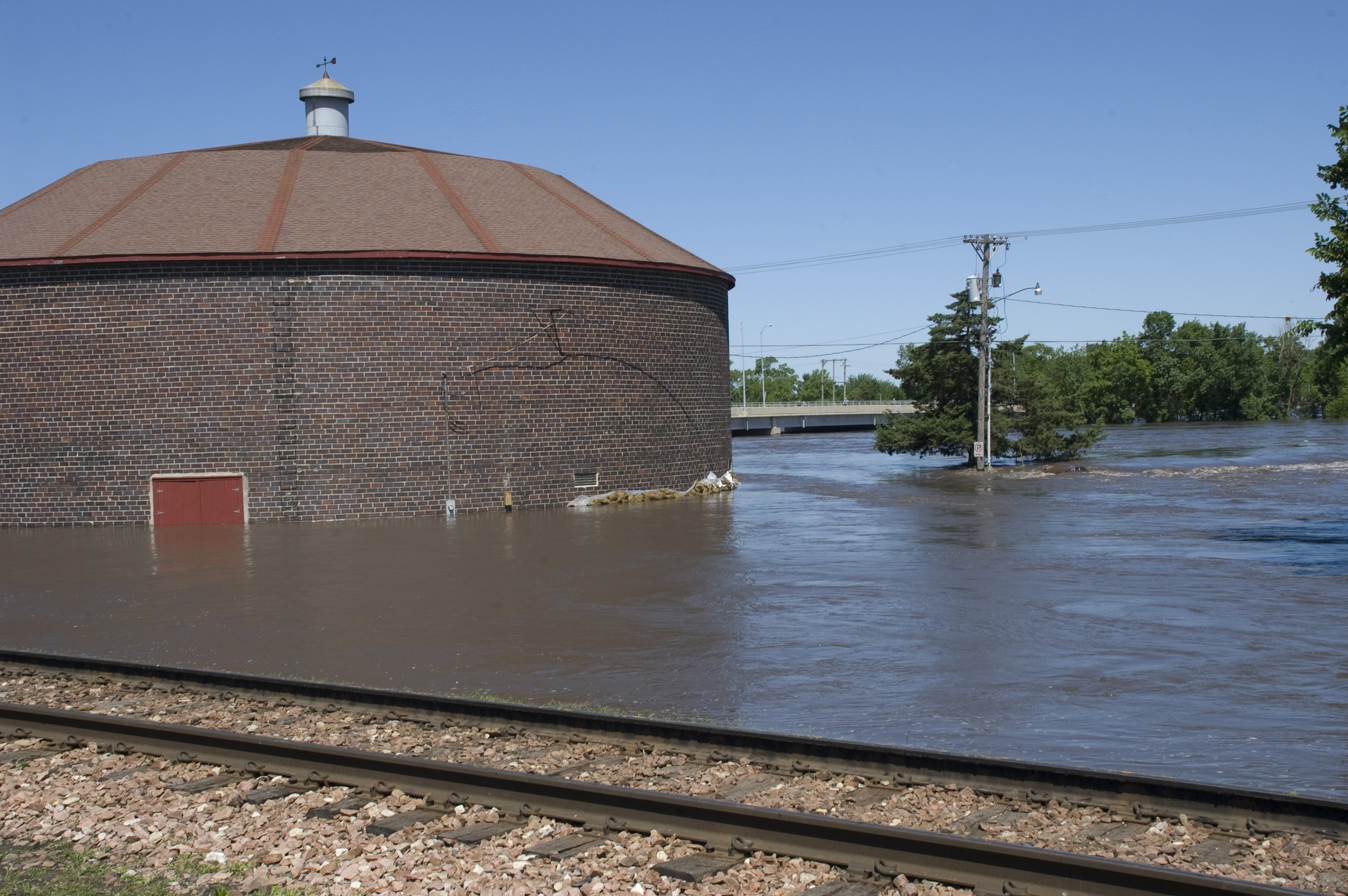
The Cedar Falls Ice House Museum during the flood of 2008.

== History ==
The Historical Society was founded June 27, 1962 by a group of residents interested in preserving and recording Cedar Falls' history. During its first year, the society met in a community room of the Cedar Falls Trust and Savings Bank. October 18, 1964, the Historical Society held its first exhibition in the basement of the Cedar Falls Trust and Savings Bank. It was an exhibition of over a hundred old photos related to Cedar Falls.

The Victorian Home was the historical society's first building. It was purchased in 1965 for a price of $23,500. The purchase price and funds for renovation were raised through a combination of fundraising and donations. The Historical Society gained possession of the house in May 1966 and began renovations soon after. Renovations included basic remodeling, removal of an upstairs kitchen, rewiring and the installation of restrooms and a custodian's apartment. The historic house museum opened May 30, 1968. There were 109 visitors on opening day. The house has continued to be the Historical Society's seat of operation. The Carriage House Museum was later added to the building for additional office, storage and exhibition space.

In 1977, the Cedar Falls Historical Society together with the city of Cedar Falls was successful in having the Ice House listed on the National Register of Historic Places. Through the work of a successful fund drive for restoration, the Ice House had its grand opening 1979 as the Ice House Museum.

== Collection ==
Because of the society's local focus, the collection ranges from the mid-1800s, when Cedar Falls was founded, to the present. The collection includes period furnishings, decorative arts, costumes, quilts and textiles, stereoscopes and cards, ice harvesting and agricultural equipment, and regional archives. It also includes historic models of Cedar Falls buildings by Gene Lehman and the William J. Lenoir model railroad collection. Much of the collection was acquired through donation or bequests. The William J. Lenoir collection was acquired through successful petitions by community members and the historical society. It is now housed in the lower level of the Carriage House Museum.

== Museums ==
- Little Red Schoolhouse Museum
- Ice House Museum
- Victorian Home and Carriage House Museum
- Behrens-Rapp Service Station and Visitor Information

== See also ==
- List of historical societies in Iowa

== Works cited ==
- Directory of Historical Organizations in the United States and Canada. Walnut Creek, CA: AltaMira Press, 2002.
- Walker, Patricia C, and Thomas Graham. Directory of Historic House Museums in the United States. Walnut Creek, CA: AltaMira Press, c2000, 2000.
