= Justice Samuel Freeman Miller House =

Historic house in Iowa, United States

- U.S. National Register of Historic Places
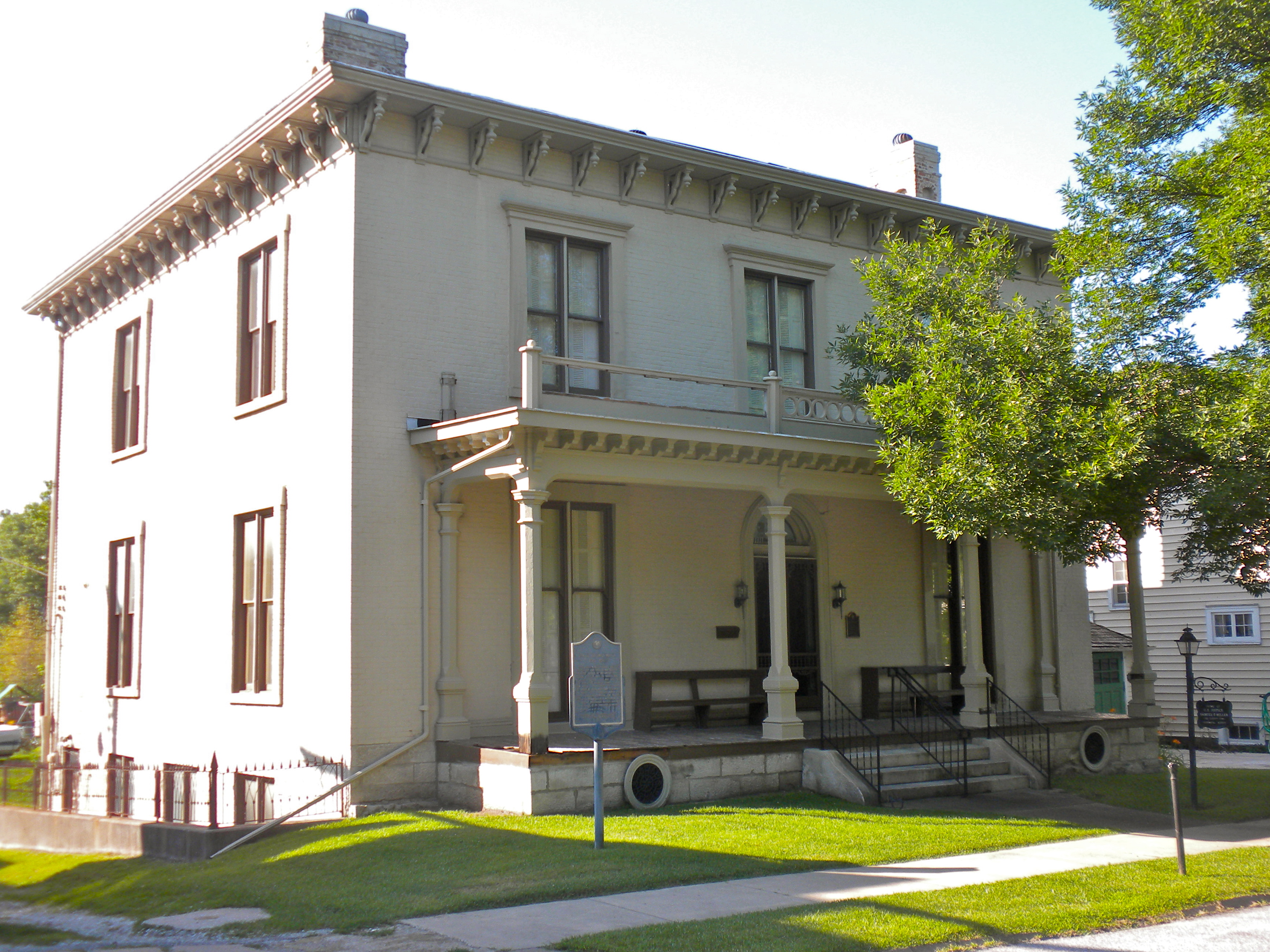

- Location within Iowa Location within the United States
- Location: 318 N. 5th St. Keokuk, Iowa
- Coordinates: 40°23′53.6″N 91°22′46.8″W
- Area: less than one acre
- Built: 1859
- Architectural style: Italianate
- NRHP reference No.: 72000477
- Added to NRHP: October 10, 1972

The Justice Samuel Freeman Miller House is a historic building in Keokuk, Iowa, United States. It is now operated as the Miller House Museum by the Lee County Historical Society. The significance of this house is its association with Samuel Freeman Miller who had it built. Originally from Kentucky, he was a physician and a lawyer with a national reputation. Miller was nominated by President Abraham Lincoln to serve on the United States Supreme Court in 1862. His was the first nomination to the court of a person who resided west of the Mississippi River. He served on the court for 28 years. Although he lived here for only two years, Miller always considered this his home.

The house is a two-story structure designed in the Italianate style. It has an exposed basement on the rear of the structure. The brick residence is capped with a low-pitched hip roof and bracketed eaves. The bracketed porch on the main level features a balcony on the second floor. The house was listed on the National Register of Historic Places in 1972.
