= University of Northern Iowa Gallery of Art =

Art gallery in Iowa, U.S.

- Location: University of Northern Iowa, Cedar Falls, Iowa, US
- Coordinates: 42.514°N 92.465°W
- Type: Art gallery
- Public transit access: 9 10 MET Transit
- Website: UNI Gallery of Art

The University of Northern Iowa Gallery of Art is an art gallery at the University of Northern Iowa in Cedar Falls, housed in the Kamerick Art Building on West 27th Street.

== Collections ==
The permanent collection of the gallery includes works by Berenice Abbott, Josef Albers, Eugène Atget, Romare Bearden, John Buck, Harold Eugene Edgerton, George Grosz, Philip Guston, R. B. Kitaj, Pablo Picasso, and Jerry Uelsmann. The current director is Darrell Taylor. The gallery hosts a rotating series of lectures and exhibitions.
