= Alison Kellow =

Australian botanist

- Education: University of Adelaide
- Occupation: Botanist
- Employer: La Trobe University (2007–)
- Website: scholars.latrobe.edu.au/akellow

Alison Kellow is a botanist and research scientist from Australia, and a lecturer at La Trobe University. As of 2023, she is curator of the La Trobe University Herbarium.

Kellow completed a Bachelor of Science degree at the University of Melbourne, and postgraduate studies in environmental science at Monash University. She completed her doctoral degree in Natural Resource Sciences at the University of Adelaide.

Kellow is the joint author, with Michael Bayly, of An Illustrated Guide to New Zealand Hebes, which was a finalist in the 2007 Montana New Zealand Book Awards. The pair worked on the project while both were researchers for the Museum of New Zealand Te Papa Tongarewa. Kellow also held a position at Industrial Research Ltd, working on flavonoid chemistry.

The standard author abbreviation Kellow is used to indicate this person as the author when citing a botanical name.

== Eponym ==
Veronica kellowiae was named in Kellow's honour by Phil Garnock-Jones, in 2007.
