= Kellow House =

Historic house in Iowa, United States

- U.S. National Register of Historic Places
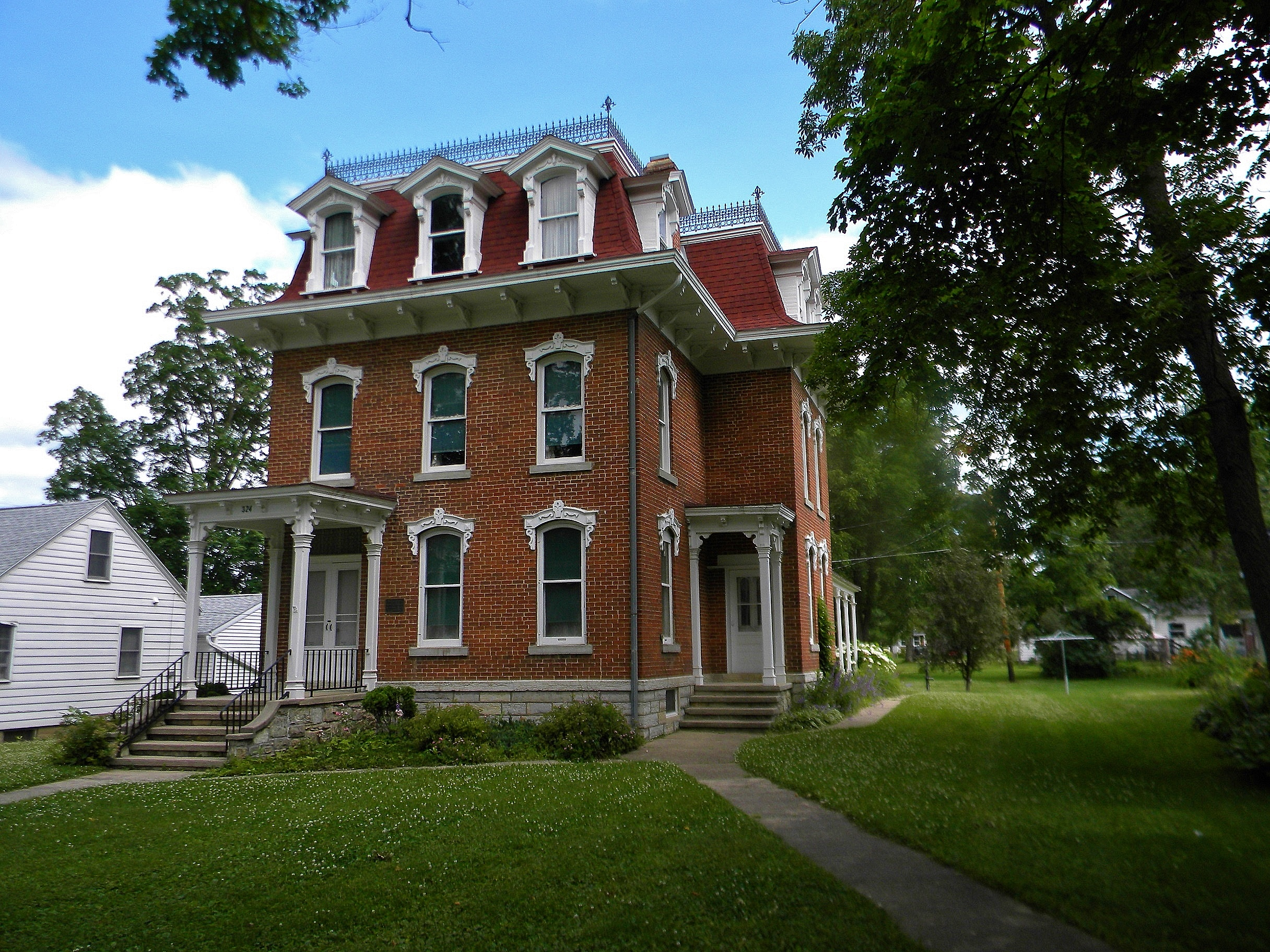

- Location within Iowa Location within the United States
- Location: 324 4th Ave., W. Cresco, Iowa
- Coordinates: 43°22′33″N 92°07′16″W
- Area: less than one acre
- Built: 1879-1880
- Built by: William Kellow, Jr.
- Architectural style: Second Empire
- NRHP reference No.: 77000517
- Added to NRHP: November 22, 1977

Kellow House is a historic building located in Cresco, Iowa, United States. Kellow was a native of Cornwall in England who settled in Iowa in 1854. He established his own grocery and merchandise firm, and had this house built in 1880 for his new wife and future family. The two-story, red brick house was designed in the Second Empire style. It features three porches and is capped with a mansard roof. The house basically follows a rectangular plan, with a pavilion that slightly protrudes from the east side. It was acquired by the Howard County Historical Society in 1969, and now houses a museum and a resource center for the historical society. The house was listed on the National Register of Historic Places in 1977.
