= Stone State Park =

State park in Woodbury and Plymouth Counties, Iowa

Stone State Park Mount Talbot State Preserve
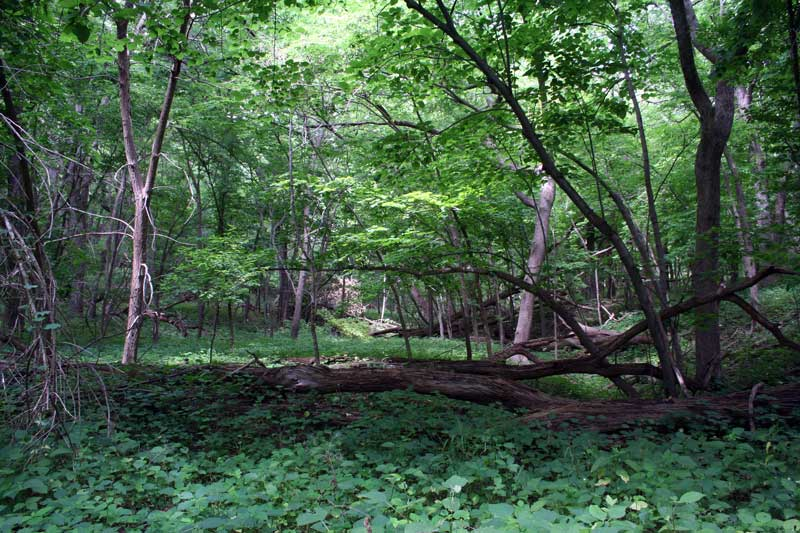

- Location within Iowa Location within the United States
- Location: Woodbury and Plymouth counties, Iowa, United States
- Coordinates: 42°32′28″N 96°27′53″W
- Area: 1,595 acres (645 ha)
- Elevation: 1,391 ft (424 m)
- Established: 1935
- Administrator: Iowa Department of Natural Resources
- Website: Official website

Stone State Park is a state park in Iowa, United States, located in the bluffs and ravines adjacent to the Big Sioux River. The park is located on the northwestern edge of Sioux City and consists of almost 1,600 acres (650 ha) in Woodbury and Plymouth Counties, and overlooks the South Dakota-Iowa border. Stone Park is near the northernmost extent of the Loess Hills, and is at the transition from clay bluffs and prairie to sedimentary rock hills and bur oak forest along the Iowa side of the Big Sioux River. A variety of prairie plants can be found on the steep slopes and ridges, including yucca, penstemon, rough blazing star, silky aster, and pasque flower. Wild turkey, white-tailed deer, coyote, and red fox are found in the park. Birdlife includes the turkey vulture, barred owl, rufous-sided (eastern) towhee, and the ovenbird. Exposed bedrock in the park is composed of lignite, shale, sandstone, and limestone, and dates to the Cretaceous period; it is rich in marine fossils. The park contains many miles of hiking and equestrian trails, and is a popular destination for day visitors, overnight campers, mountain bike enthusiasts, and picnickers.

== Mount Talbot State Preserve ==
The northern part of Stone State Park extending from Woodbury County into Plymouth County is the 90-acre (36 ha) Mount Talbot State Preserve. The property, which includes that of the state park, was acquired by Daniel Talbot in 1885. The high grassy ridge where his farm was located became known as Mount Talbot. Biological surveys by The Nature Conservancy and the Iowa Department of Natural Resources were conducted in the 1980s and this section of Stone State Park was dedicated as a biological state preserve in 1989. It contains about 35 acres (14 ha) of prairie on narrow ridge tops that are adjacent to oak woodlands that are located in deep ravines. It features over 75 native plants and 42 species of butterflies.

== Dorothy Pecaut Nature Center ==
The Dorothy Pecaut Nature Center in Sioux City is a destination nature preserve for Woodbury County, and is located within the boundaries of Stone Park. The butterfly garden is unique to the area; wild turkeys and white-tail deer are commonly sighted from the well-marked trails.
