= North Scott High School =

Public secondary school in Eldridge, Iowa, US

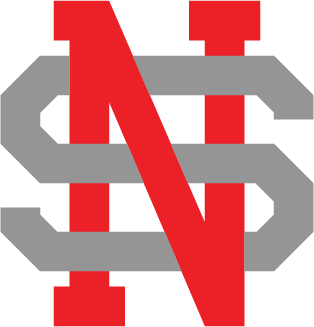

Location
- 200 S. First Street; Eldridge, Iowa 52748; United States; 41.653°N 90.584°W

Information
- Type: Public high school
- Established: 1958; 68 years ago
- School district: North Scott Community School District
- Superintendent: Joe Stutting
- Principal: Andrew Lehn
- Teaching staff: 63.14 (FTE)
- Grades: 9–12
- Enrollment: 1,048 (2023-2024)
- Student to teacher ratio: 16.60
- Colors: Scarlet and Silver
- Athletics conference: Mississippi Athletic Conference
- Mascot: Lancers
- Website: nshs.north-scott.k12.ia.us

North Scott High School is a suburban public four-year comprehensive high school located in Eldridge, Iowa. The school is part of the North Scott Community School District, and has an enrollment of approximately 1,000 students in grades 9 through 12.

Located at 200 South First Street in Eldridge (approximately one mile west of U.S. Highway 61), North Scott High School draws students from several communities in northern Scott County, Iowa, including Eldridge, Dixon, Donahue, Long Grove, Maysville, McCausland, Park View, Princeton and surrounding rural areas.

== History ==
North Scott High School was completed in 1958 at a cost of $1.2 million, and originally conceived as a junior-senior high facility. Prior to the school's opening, students living in what is now the North Scott School District completed their high school education at one of a number of area high schools – which included Clinton, Davenport (now Davenport Central), LeClaire (now part of the Pleasant Valley Community School District), Wheatland (now Calamus-Wheatland), or DeWitt.

Junior high students continued to attend the high school until 1975, when they were moved into the newly built North Scott Junior High School. The junior high building is located approximately one-quarter-mile southwest of the high school campus.

The high school has undergone many renovations and additions during its 60-year history. A fine arts auditorium, a 900-seat venue opened in 1982; the auditorium was extensively remodeled in 2017 and 2018. The athletic lobby, cafeteria, and administrative offices were also extensively remodeled twice, in 1983 and in 2015.

Other additions have included an auxiliary gymnasium, a special education wing, modern media center with computer labs (updated in the 2010s) and a science and music wing on the school's west end.

In August 2005, North Scott High School received an $800,000 Smaller Learning Communities Grant aimed at assisting students during their high school years.

== Fine arts ==
Lancer Productions offers at least three shows a year with chances for students to participate on and off stage. Troupe 739 in the International Thespian Society. Lancer Productions have performed at many State and International Thespian Festivals.

The music department has multiple choirs (including two jazz choirs), two jazz bands, two concert bands, a pit band, a marching band and an orchestra. On February 25, 2009, it was announced that Jazz I was one of fifteen high school jazz band finalists for the 14th annual Essentially Ellington competition and festival held at Lincoln Center in New York City each May.

Several Reader's Theatre and Ensemble Acting plays received Division I ratings, the highest honor possible, in all-state competition. The school's duet act for the play "The Rabbit Hole" was selected as the best out of 800 in Iowa during the 2010 competition.

=== The Pit ===
The school's main gymnasium is referred to as "The Pit," in part due to its horseshoe arena-type shape.

The Pit underwent a major renovation in 2006, as part of a larger project to expand the girls' locker rooms.

== Athletics ==
North Scott sports teams are known as the Lancers; their uniforms display the school's colors of scarlet and silver.

The school fields athletic teams in 19 sports, including:

- Summer: Baseball and softball.
- Fall: Football, volleyball, boys' cross country, girls' cross country and boys' golf.
- Winter: Boys' basketball, girls' basketball, wrestling and boys' and girls' bowling.
- Spring: Boys' track and field, girls' track and field, boys' soccer, girls' soccer, girls' golf, boys' tennis and girls' tennis.

North Scott does not field its own swimming program; however, swimmers from North Scott participate in a cooperative with neighboring Pleasant Valley. The school also has a cheerleading squad and a competitive dance team named the Silver Shakers.

North Scott is classified as a 4A school (Iowa's largest 48 schools), according to the Iowa High School Athletic Association and Iowa Girls High School Athletic Union; in sports where there are fewer divisions, the Lancers are usually in the largest class (e.g., Class 3A for wrestling, boys soccer, and Class 2A for golf and tennis). Exceptions include football (where the Lancers are in Class 3A, the second-largest tier of schools per the IHSAA) and certain girls' sports, where North Scott is a 4A school in volleyball and girls' basketball, which have five classes, and is a 2A school in girls' soccer, which has three classes. The school is a member of the 10-team Mississippi Athletic Conference (known to locals as the MAC), which comprises schools from the Iowa Quad Cities, along with Burlington, Clinton and Muscatine high schools.

In addition to individual state championships in track (both boys and girls), girls' cross country and wrestling, the following teams have won state titles:

- Boys' basketball: State champion – 2015 (Class 4A)
- Girls' basketball: State champions – 2017, 2019, and 2020 (Class 4A)
- Indoor boys' track: State championship (Class A) in 1962.
- Softball: State champions – 1987, 1993 and 2002 (Class 3A); the first two championships were in a single-class tournament, while the third was in Class 3A. Longtime softball coach Dennis Johnson was elected to the National Softball Hall of Fame in 1998.
- Girls' cross country: State team championship (Class 3A) in 1988.
- Girls' soccer: State champions (Class 2A) in 2014.
- Volleyball: 2-time State Champions - 1985 (2A) & 2025 (4A)
- Silver Shakers – Dance Team: State championship Pom – 1996, 2006, 2015, 2016, 2017, 2022. State championship Lyrical – 2016, 2017. State championship Jazz 2017.
- Cheerleading: State championship 2016
- Football: 2020 Class 3A State Champions

== North Scott Agriculture Program and FFA Chapter ==
Founded in 1958, the North Scott Agriculture Program and FFA Chapter has excelled the past few years through both student and chapter awards. The agriculture program named the top FFA chapter in Iowa in 2020 and one of the top ten chapters in the nation through the National Chapter Award Program.

== Notable alumni ==
- Beth Bader – American professional golfer (born 1973) (class of 1992)
- Mike Busch – American baseball player (born 1968) (class of 1986)
- Kari Lake – American political figure (born 1969) (class of 1986), Republican candidate in the 2022 Arizona gubernatorial election
- Marlon Stewart (class of 2015), played with the NBA G League (last with the Birmingham Squadron)

== See also ==
- List of high schools in Iowa
