= Buffalo Bill Cody Homestead =

Historic house in Iowa, United States

- U.S. National Register of Historic Places
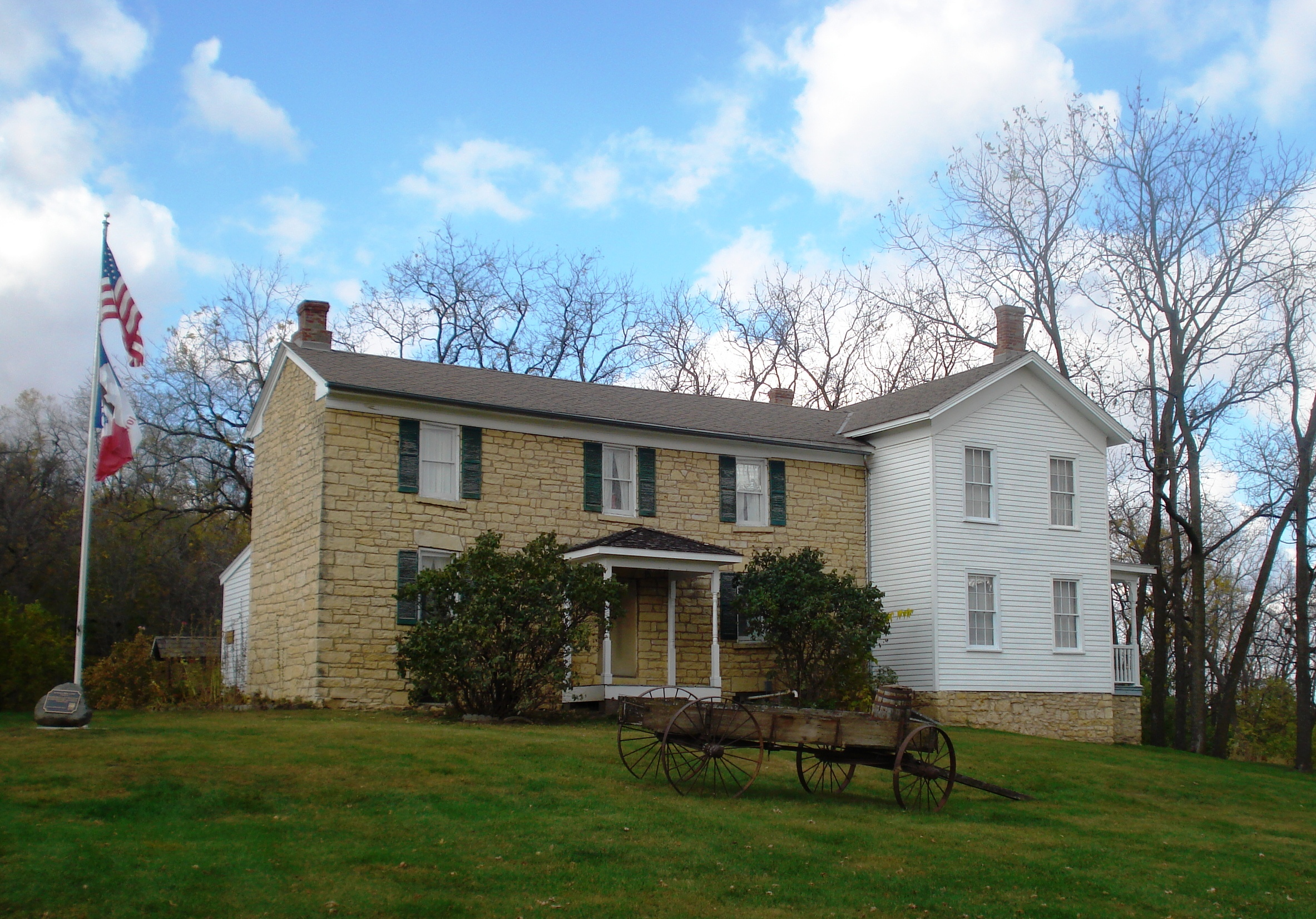

- Location within Iowa Location within the United States
- Interactive map showing the location of Buffalo Bill Cody Homestead
- Location: Butler Township, Scott County, Iowa, at 28050 230th Ave, Princeton, Iowa
- Coordinates: 41°42′49″N 90°27′10″W
- Built: 1847
- NRHP reference No.: 74000812
- Added to NRHP: January 24, 1974

The Buffalo Bill Cody Homestead is the boyhood home of Buffalo Bill Cody, a government scout and Wild West showman. The homestead is located in the broad valley of the Wapsipinicon River Valley south of McCausland, Iowa, United States, in rural Scott County. The farmhouse was built in 1847 by Isaac Cody, Buffalo Bill's father, of native limestone and contains walnut floors and trim.

Isaac and Mary Cody, parents of the legendary Buffalo Bill, moved their family to the homestead from LeClaire, Iowa, where Bill was born and raised.

On January 24, 1974, The Cody Homestead was entered to the National Register of Historic Places.

The Iowa Society of The National Society of the Colonial Dames of America owns the furnishings in the 1847 main room and the 1870 bedroom.

== Gallery ==
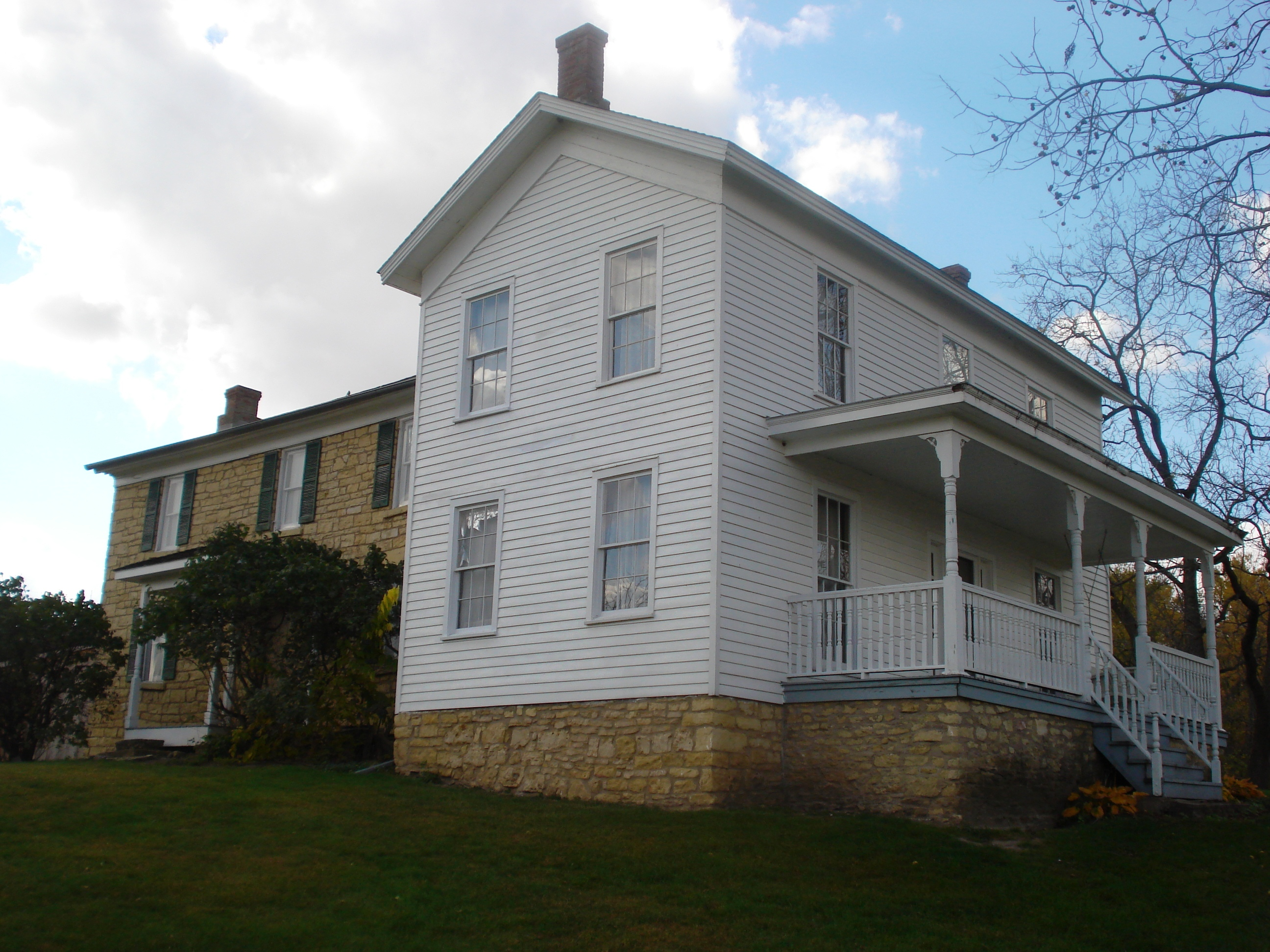
North facade of the home

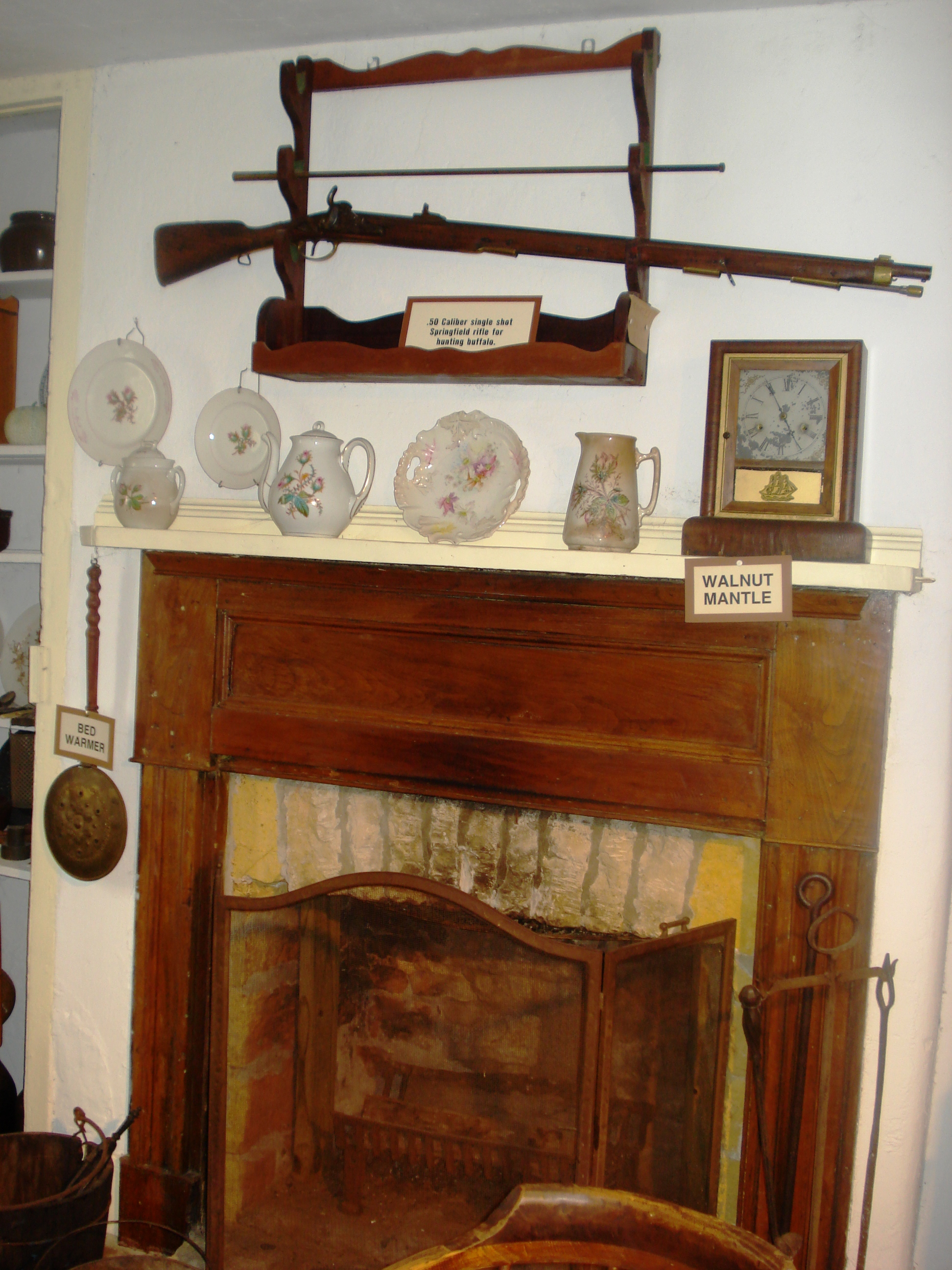
Fireplace in the kitchen of the Cody home

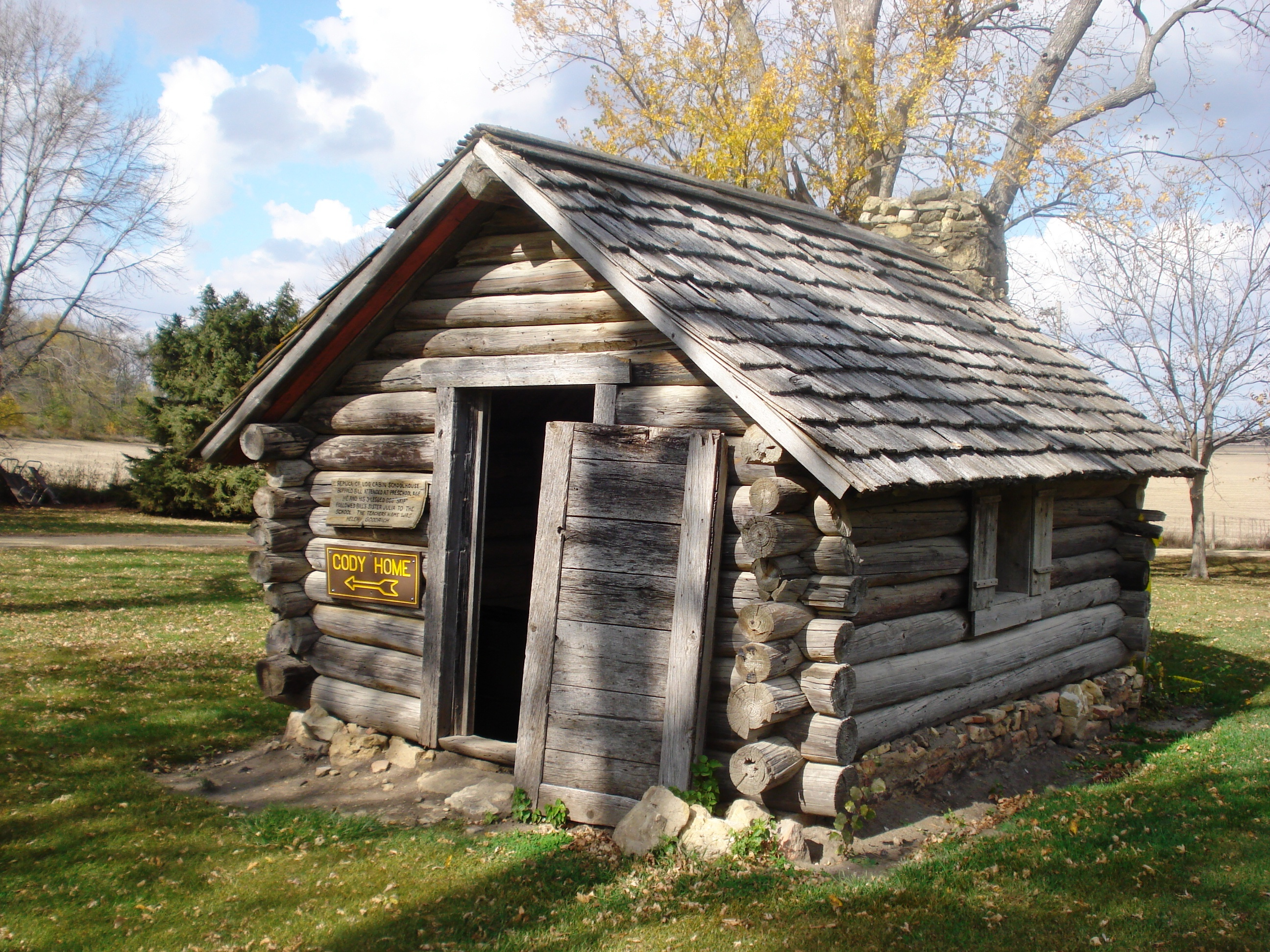
Schoolhouse on the Cody Homestead
