= Scott County Library System =

Coordinates: 41.6565°N 90.5762°W

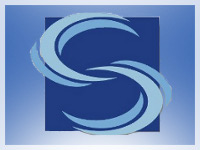
SCLS Logo

The Scott County Library System is the library system in Scott County, Iowa. It is headquartered in Eldridge, Iowa,

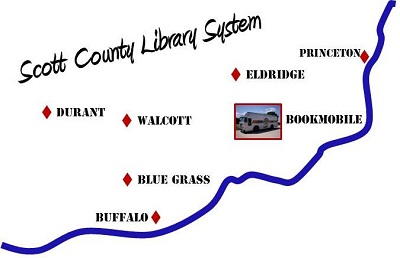
Map of SCLS locations, 2012.

== History ==
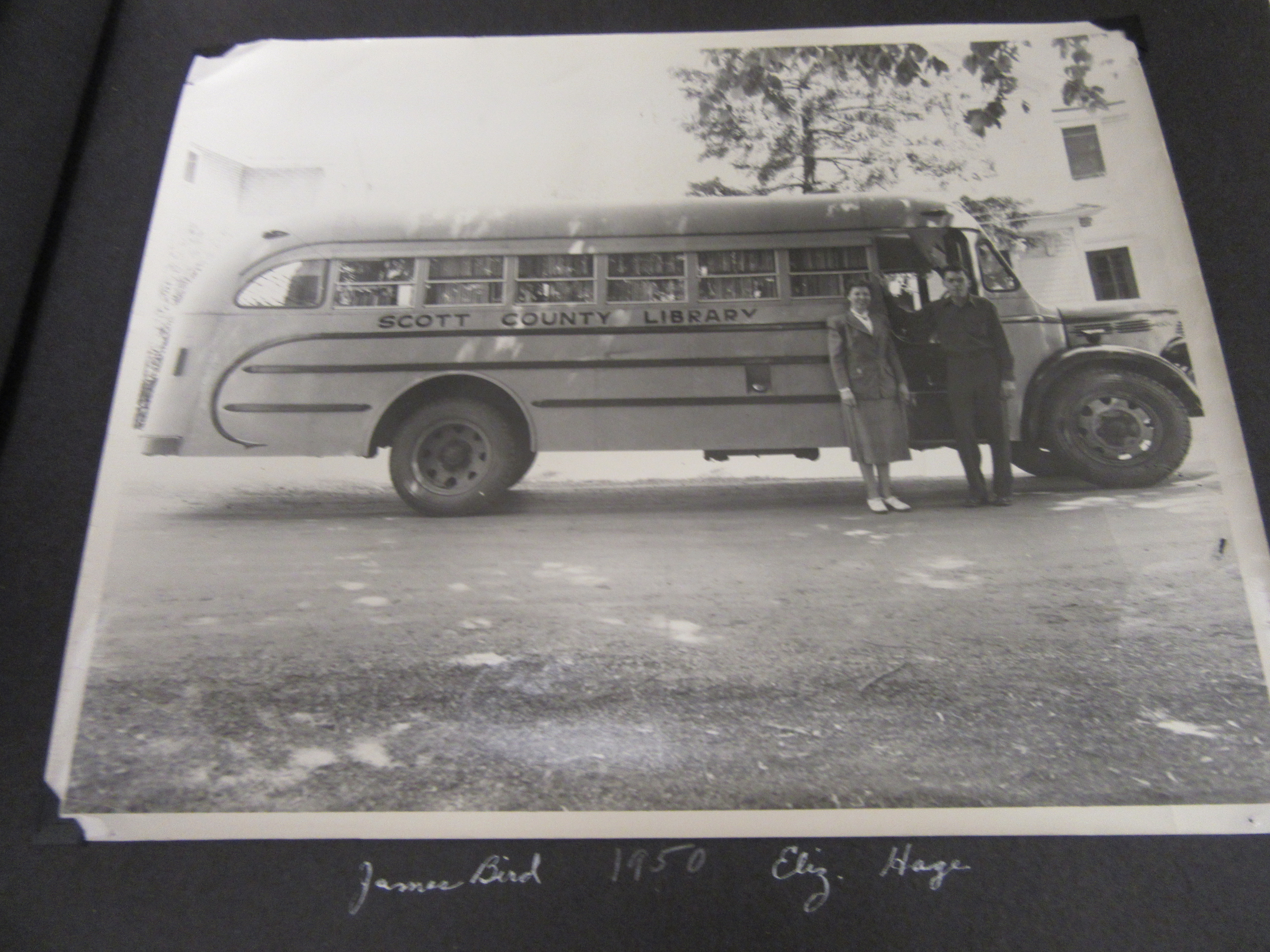
Director Elizabeth Hage, Bookmobile driver James Bird, 1950 with converted school bus.

Before the Scott County Library system was established, a bookmobile went into operation on a voluntary basis. The Scott County Bookmobile, Inc. was organized June 16, 1947 . Edna Spies served as the president, driver, and librarian of the organization until the March 1950. The first purchased bookmobile was a retrofitted school bus.

In 1948, Scott County voters agreed to a request for tax support establishing a countywide library system. A headquarters was opened in January 1950 in the Eckermann Implement building in downtown Eldridge, with the intention that it would serve the bookmobile. The 25-by-52-square-foot space functioned as a library, and a garage was constructed for the bookmobile. Three months after the library opened, 4,000 books had been received and processed by Director Elizabeth Hage and her staff of three. The library continued to grow, registering 643 patrons by August of that year. Arrangements were made with the Scott County Bookmobile to gain access to the unit's mobile library, and by May 1950 the bookmobile began serving all 16 communities in Scott County, visiting three or more towns per day. Throughout the summer the Bookmobile had a single purpose of providing reading to adults and children in the rural communities; but in the fall through winter it serviced 110 schools throughout Scott County.

Branches were established in Blue Grass, Eldridge and Princeton. The Princeton branch was the first to open, in August 1950, while the Walcott branch was established in 1952 and the Buffalo Branch started in 1962. The city of Durant contracted for library services with the Scott County Library System beginning in 1966. At one time, the library also had branches in LeClaire, Long Grove, New Liberty, Park View and Ridgeview (now part of Davenport), but these have since closed.

The library's main branch, in Eldridge, has relocated twice since its opening: in 1962, to a new building across the street from the Eckermann building; and in 2003, to a vacant supermarket building one-fourth of a mile north of LeClaire Road.
