= Long Grove =

Long Grove may refer to a place in the United States:

- Long Grove, Illinois
- Long Grove, Iowa
