= Butler Township, Scott County, Iowa =

Butler Township
- Township
- Location in Scott County
- Coordinates: 41°43′29″N 090°29′26″W
- Country: United States
- State: Iowa
- County: Scott

Area
  - Total: 34.4 sq mi (89.1 km^{2})
  - Land: 34.19 sq mi (88.54 km^{2})
  - Water: 0.22 sq mi (0.56 km^{2}) 0.63%
- Elevation: 663 ft (202 m)

Population (2000)
  - Total: 3,454
  - Density: 100/sq mi (39/km^{2})
- GNIS feature ID: 0467516

Butler Township is a township in Scott County, Iowa, United States. As of the 2000 census, its population was 3,454.

== Geography ==
Butler Township covers an area of 34.4 square miles (89 km^{2}) and contains two incorporated settlements: McCausland and Park View. According to the USGS, it contains four cemeteries: Fairview, McCausland, Mount Joy and Mount Union.

The streams of Glynn Creek and McDonald Creek run through this township.

== Transportation ==
Butler Township contains one airport or landing strip, Quiet Valley Heliport.
