= Princeton, Iowa =

- City
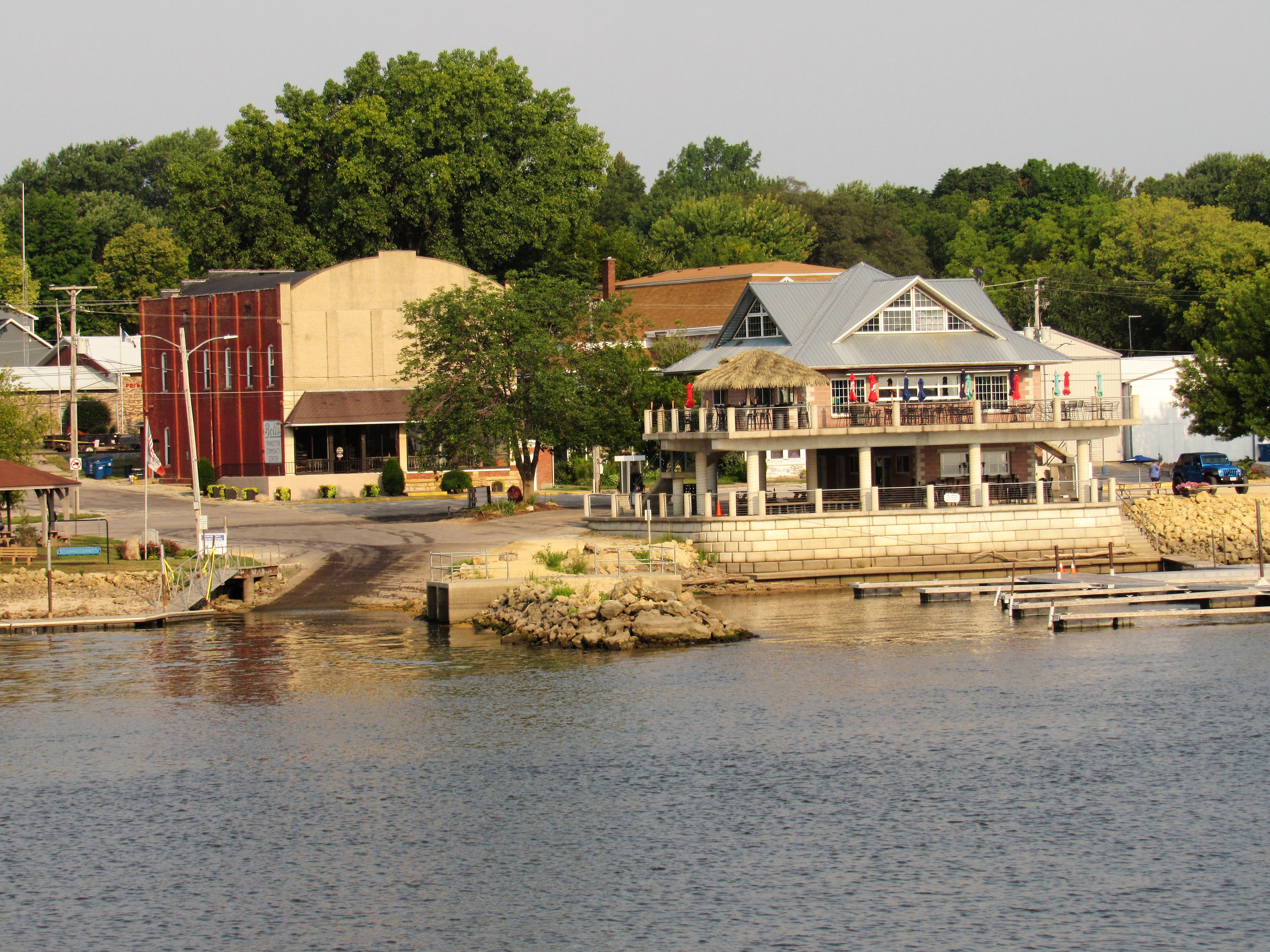
- The main commercial area of Princeton, Iowa from the Mississippi River.
- Motto: Princeton on the Mississippi
- Location of Princeton, Iowa
- Coordinates: 41°40′19″N 90°21′25″W
- Country: United States
- State: Iowa
- County: Scott

Area
  - Total: 3.26 sq mi (8.45 km^{2})
  - Land: 3.26 sq mi (8.45 km^{2})
  - Water: 0 sq mi (0.00 km^{2})
- Elevation: 679 ft (207 m)

Population (2020)
  - Total: 923
  - Density: 283.1/sq mi (109.29/km^{2})
- Time zone: UTC-6 (Central (CST))
  - Summer (DST): UTC-5 (CDT)
- ZIP code: 52768
- Area code: 563
- FIPS code: 19-64740
- GNIS feature ID: 2396280
- Website: www.princetoniowa.us

Princeton is a city in Scott County, Iowa, United States. The population was 923 at the time of the 2020 census.

== History ==
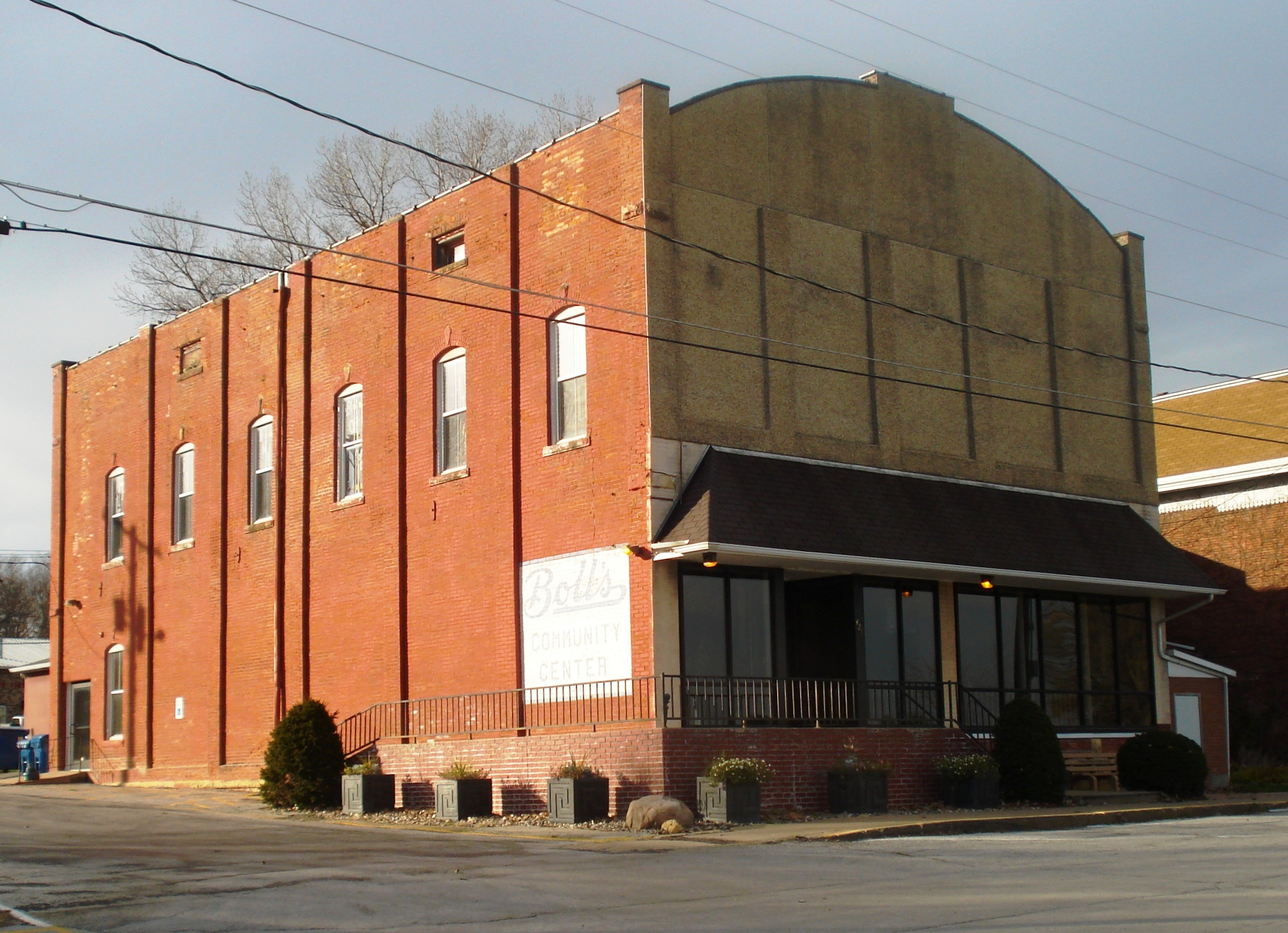
Community Center

The first known settlers in Princeton Township were brothers Giles and Haswell Pineo, circa 1836. By 1838, Elizabeth City – the predecessor to Princeton – had its first store, ferry across the nearby Wapsipinicon River, mill and distillery were in operation.

The city now known as Princeton was platted and recorded in 1852, and the city was incorporated in 1860. Rail service to Chicago began in 1860. Samuel Porter was the first elected mayor in 1858, for a population of less than 500. The population has fluctuated several times through the years, and today stands at less than 900 residents.

The city's mainstay businesses for many years were Farmers Savings Bank, chartered in 1908, and Boll's General Store, founded by Henry "Heinie" Boll in 1922. Farmers Savings Bank is now part of Milan, Illinois-based Blackhawk Bank & Trust, while Boll's Store continued until 1997. Boll's storefront is now the Community Center.

Education of the area's children started in a log cabin, moved to a converted barn and then, in 1866, to a stone building. Princeton became part of the North Scott Community School District in 1956, and is now served by Virgil Grissom Elementary School, which opened in 1967.

The Methodist and the Presbyterian churches began to hold services in 1840, and the Lutherans first held services in a building known as "Old Brick," located 4 miles (6.4 km) west of town, in 1852. Today, Zion Lutheran Church (part of the Evangelical Lutheran Church in America and Princeton Presbyterian Church, affiliated with Presbyterian Church USA's Presbytery of East Iowa, are the city's two churches, with Zion founded in 1898 and the Presbyterian church in 1854. Both churches are members of the Princeton, Pleasant Valley, Argo and LeClaire Pastors' Group, a coalition of clergy from churches serving those communities.

== Geography ==
According to the United States Census Bureau, the city has a total area of 2.56 square miles (6.63 km^{2}), all land.

== Government ==
Princeton has a mayor-council form of government with a mayor and five city council members. All council members are at-large. City council meetings are conducted monthly on the second Thursday of each month at the city hall.

== Education ==
Princeton is part of the North Scott Community School District, which spans 220 square miles (570 km^{2}) in northern Scott County. The district is served by a seven-member board of education, which meets on the second and fourth Mondays of each month at the district's Administration Center in Eldridge.

Elementary-aged students from Princeton, as well as McCausland and adjacent rural areas, attend school at Virgil Grissom Elementary, located on the city's west edge. Older students attend either North Scott Junior High or North Scott High School, both located in Eldridge.

== Demographics ==
Historical populations
Year	Pop.	±%
1860	469	—
1870	498	+6.2%
1880	494	−0.8%
1890	398	−19.4%
1900	456	+14.6%
1910	379	−16.9%
1920	414	+9.2%
1930	373	−9.9%
1940	414	+11.0%
1950	495	+19.6%
1960	580	+17.2%
1970	633	+9.1%
1980	965	+52.4%
1990	904	−6.3%
2000	946	+4.6%
2010	886	−6.3%
2020	923	+4.2%
Source:"American FactFinder". United States Census Bureau. and Iowa Data Center; Source: U.S. Decennial Census

=== 2020 census ===
As of the census of 2020, there were 923 people, 378 households, and 254 families residing in the city. The population density was 283.1 inhabitants per square mile (109.3/km^{2}). There were 407 housing units at an average density of 124.8 per square mile (48.2/km^{2}). The racial makeup of the city was 93.4% White, 1.1% Black or African American, 0.1% Native American, 0.1% Asian, 0.1% Pacific Islander, 0.9% from other races and 4.3% from two or more races. Hispanic or Latino persons of any race comprised 3.3% of the population.

Of the 378 households, 27.8% of which had children under the age of 18 living with them, 58.2% were married couples living together, 9.0% were cohabitating couples, 16.1% had a female householder with no spouse or partner present and 16.7% had a male householder with no spouse or partner present. 32.8% of all households were non-families. 24.3% of all households were made up of individuals, 9.8% had someone living alone who was 65 years old or older.

The median age in the city was 43.0 years. 25.1% of the residents were under the age of 20; 4.6% were between the ages of 20 and 24; 22.4% were from 25 and 44; 29.0% were from 45 and 64; and 18.9% were 65 years of age or older. The gender makeup of the city was 51.0% male and 49.0% female.

=== 2010 census ===
As of the census of 2010, there were 886 people, 363 households, and 252 families living in the city. The population density was 346.1 inhabitants per square mile (133.6/km^{2}). There were 399 housing units at an average density of 155.9 per square mile (60.2/km^{2}). The racial makeup of the city was 97.1% White, 0.3% African American, 0.2% Native American, 0.6% from other races, and 1.8% from two or more races. Hispanic or Latino of any race were 3.7% of the population.

There were 363 households, of which 28.7% had children under the age of 18 living with them, 59.5% were married couples living together, 6.3% had a female householder with no husband present, 3.6% had a male householder with no wife present, and 30.6% were non-families. 24.0% of all households were made up of individuals, and 9.9% had someone living alone who was 65 years of age or older. The average household size was 2.44 and the average family size was 2.85.

The median age in the city was 44.3 years. 22% of residents were under the age of 18; 6.5% were between the ages of 18 and 24; 22.5% were from 25 to 44; 33.9% were from 45 to 64; and 15.1% were 65 years of age or older. The gender makeup of the city was 50.8% male and 49.2% female.

=== 2000 census ===
As of the census of 2000, there were 946 people, 362 households, and 264 families living in the city. The population density was 370.5 inhabitants per square mile (143.1/km^{2}). There were 377 housing units at an average density of 147.6 per square mile (57.0/km^{2}). The racial makeup of the city was 98.73% White, 0.11% African American, 0.32% Native American, 0.11% Asian, 0.11% from other races, and 0.63% from two or more races. Hispanic or Latino of any race were 0.74% of the population.

There were 362 households, out of which 39.0% had children under the age of 18 living with them, 59.4% were married couples living together, 8.6% had a female householder with no husband present, and 26.8% were non-families. 23.2% of all households were made up of individuals, and 10.5% had someone living alone who was 65 years of age or older. The average household size was 2.61 and the average family size was 3.05.

29.4% are under the age of 18, 5.6% from 18 to 24, 31.7% from 25 to 44, 23.0% from 45 to 64, and 10.3% who were 65 years of age or older. The median age was 37 years. For every 100 females, there were 110.2 males. For every 100 females age 18 and over, there were 106.2 males.

The median income for a household in the city was $44,833, and the median income for a family was $53,182. Males had a median income of $38,289 versus $21,923 for females. The per capita income for the city was $18,678. About 5.6% of families and 6.0% of the population were below the poverty line, including 9.0% of those under age 18 and 3.1% of those age 65 or over.
