= Eldridge, Iowa =

- City
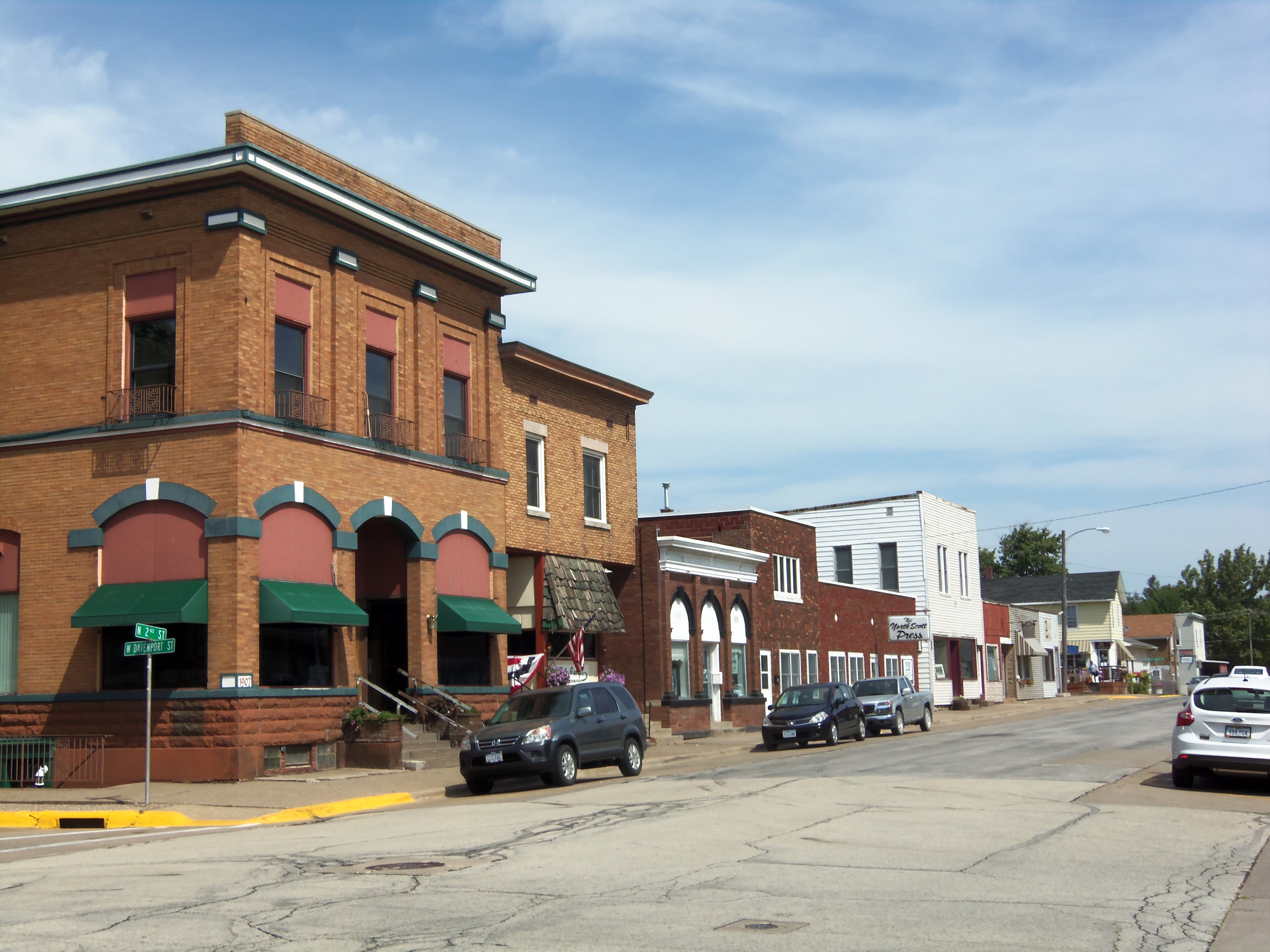
- Downtown Eldridge

- Location of Eldridge, Iowa
- Coordinates: 41°37′55″N 90°35′53″W
- Country: United States
- State: Iowa
- County: Scott

Area
  - City: 9.76 sq mi (25.27 km^{2})
  - Land: 9.76 sq mi (25.27 km^{2})
  - Water: 0 sq mi (0.00 km^{2})
- Elevation: 774 ft (236 m)

Population (2020)
  - City: 6,726
  - Density: 689.2/sq mi (266.12/km^{2})
  - Metro: 382,630 (135th)
  - CSA: 474,019 (US: 90th)
- Time zone: UTC-6 (Central (CST))
  - Summer (DST): UTC-5 (CDT)
- ZIP code: 52748
- Area code: 563
- FIPS code: 19-24600
- GNIS feature ID: 2394640
- Website: www.cityofeldridgeia.org

Eldridge is a city in Scott County, Iowa, United States. The population was 6,726 in the 2020 Census; Eldridge is a rural community and part of the Quad Cities metropolitan area.

== History ==
Jacob M. Eldridge, the city's namesake, arrived in central Scott County in 1846, having purchased land for $1.25 per acre. Immigrants from Germany soon followed, and northern Scott County slowly began to develop. Railroads were developed during the 1860s, bringing more settlers. Eldridge Junction, built on land donated by Jacob Eldridge, was incorporated on July 2, 1871. A post office and a Presbyterian church were soon built.

Eldridge faced several challenges during its early years. The railroad faltered financially during the 1880s and was re-located to Oxford Junction, while a smallpox epidemic several years later was said to have totally isolated the city. A fire heavily damaged the city's business district in 1904, and in 1918 a tornado of unknown strength heavily damaged or destroyed several residences and the church, and killed three people. Each time, the city recovered, and the farming community maintained its status as a grain and livestock shipping center.

The city began growing in population during the 1950s, starting with the formation of the Scott County Library System (a countywide network of libraries serving smaller communities in the area) in 1950, the founding of Faith Lutheran Church in 1952 (with a church building completed in 1956), and the North Scott Community School District in 1956. By the late 1960s, the population had grown to more than 1,000 residents, and with the creation of several industrial parks to encourage new business development, the city continued to grow.

Eldridge and the surrounding North Scott community is served by the North Scott Press weekly newspaper. The newspaper, founded in 1968 by the owners of the nearby DeWitt Observer, was cited by the Iowa State Education Association – in awarding its School Bell Award for two years in a row – that "North Scott is the only place in Iowa where a community was formed by a newspaper."

== Geography ==
Eldridge is located north of Davenport along U.S. Route 61.

According to the United States Census Bureau, the city has a total area of 9.48 square miles (24.55 km^{2}), all land.

== Demographics ==
Historical population
Census	Pop.	Note	%±
1880	97		—
1900	207		—
1910	217		4.8%
1920	234		7.8%
1930	245		4.7%
1940	283		15.5%
1950	376		32.9%
1960	583		55.1%
1970	1,535		163.3%
1980	3,279		113.6%
1990	3,378		3.0%
2000	4,159		23.1%
2010	5,651		35.9%
2020	6,726		19.0%
2022 (est.)	6,756		0.4%
U.S. Decennial Census

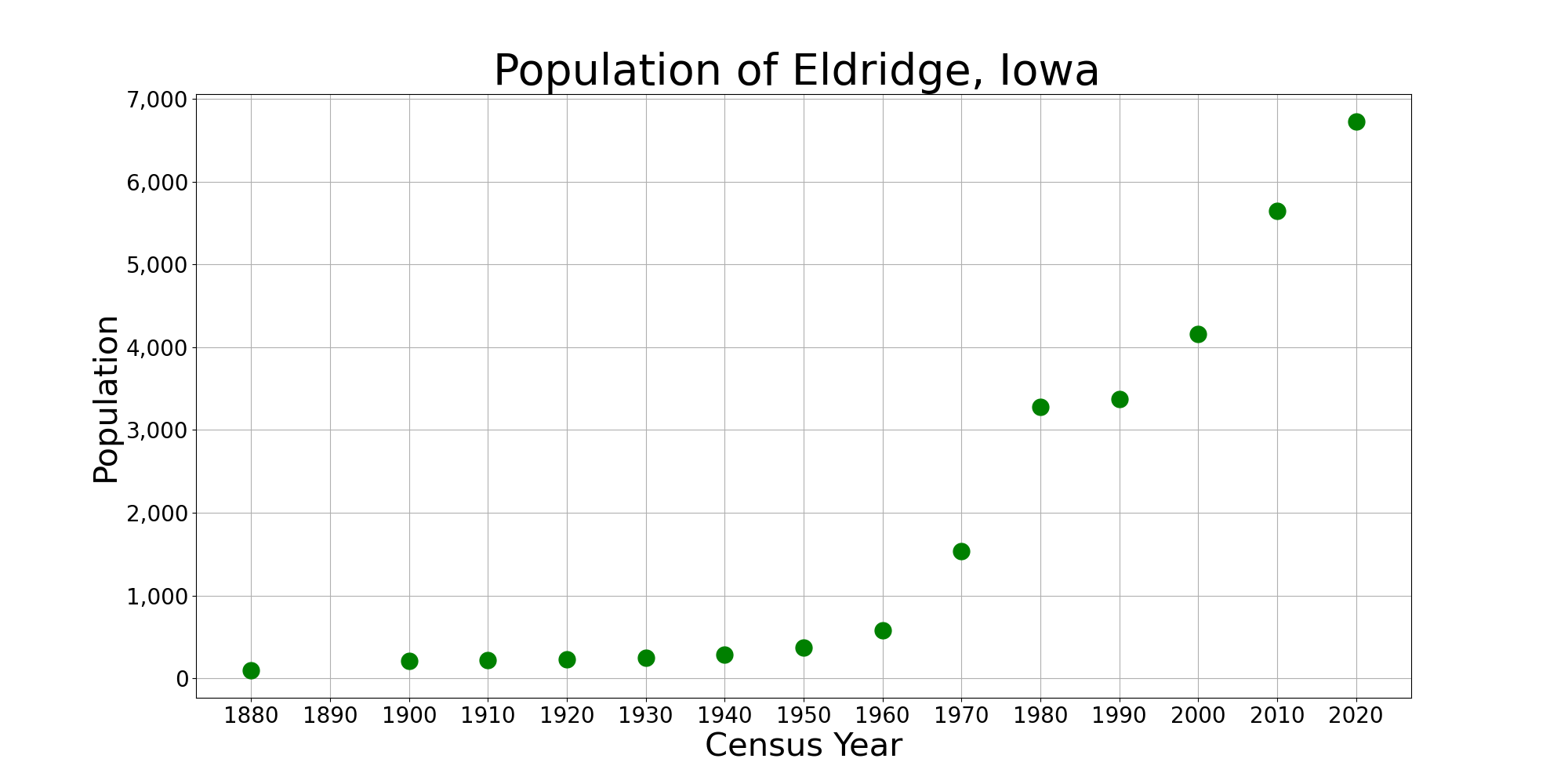
The population of Eldridge, Iowa from US census data

=== 2020 census ===
As of the 2020 census, Eldridge had a population of 6,726, with 2,679 households and 1,854 families. The population density was 689.3 inhabitants per square mile (266.1/km^{2}), and there were 2,820 housing units at an average density of 289.0 per square mile (111.6/km^{2}).

The median age was 39.2 years. 26.8% of residents were under the age of 18 and 17.1% were 65 years of age or older; by broader age groups, 29.5% were under the age of 20, 4.4% were from 20 to 24, 24.3% were from 25 to 44, and 24.6% were from 45 to 64. The gender makeup of the city was 47.8% male and 52.2% female. For every 100 females there were 91.6 males, and for every 100 females age 18 and over there were 89.1 males age 18 and over.

There were 2,679 households, of which 36.3% had children under the age of 18 living in them. Of all households, 55.3% were married-couple households, 5.1% were cohabiting couple households, 24.8% had a female householder with no spouse or partner present, and 14.8% had a male householder with no spouse or partner present. About 30.8% were non-family households, 27.0% were made up of individuals, and 13.9% had someone living alone who was 65 years of age or older.

There were 2,820 housing units, of which 5.0% were vacant. The homeowner vacancy rate was 1.6% and the rental vacancy rate was 6.1%. 93.5% of residents lived in urban areas, while 6.5% lived in rural areas.

Racial composition as of the 2020 census
Race	Number	Percent
White	6,245	92.8%
Black or African American	68	1.0%
American Indian and Alaska Native	16	0.2%
Asian	51	0.8%
Native Hawaiian and Other Pacific Islander	3	0.0%
Some other race	54	0.8%
Two or more races	289	4.3%
Hispanic or Latino (of any race)	247	3.7%

=== 2010 census ===
As of the census of 2010, there were 5,651 people, 2,213 households, and 1,576 families living in the city. The population density was 596.1 inhabitants per square mile (230.2/km^{2}). There were 2,296 housing units at an average density of 242.2 per square mile (93.5/km^{2}). The racial makeup of the city was 96.8% White, 0.5% African American, 0.2% Native American, 0.5% Asian, 0.3% from other races, and 1.8% from two or more races. Hispanic or Latino of any race were 2.1% of the population.

There were 2,213 households, of which 39.1% had children under the age of 18 living with them, 58.2% were married couples living together, 9.9% had a female householder with no husband present, 3.1% had a male householder with no wife present, and 28.8% were non-families. 24.7% of all households were made up of individuals, and 8.6% had someone living alone who was 65 years of age or older. The average household size was 2.55 and the average family size was 3.07.

The median age in the city was 36.7 years. 28.8% of residents were under the age of 18; 6.3% were between the ages of 18 and 24; 27.4% were from 25 to 44; 26.4% were from 45 to 64; and 11.1% were 65 years of age or older. The gender makeup of the city was 48.0% male and 52.0% female.

=== 2000 census ===
As of the census of 2000, there were 4,159 people, 1,501 households, and 1,179 families living in the city. The population density was 442.4 inhabitants per square mile (170.8/km^{2}). There were 1,540 housing units at an average density of 163.8 per square mile (63.2/km^{2}). The racial makeup of the city was 98.58% White, 0.24% African American, 0.05% Native American, 0.22% Asian, 0.17% from other races, and 0.75% from two or more races. Hispanic or Latino of any race were 1.61% of the population.

There were 1,501 households, out of which 44.3% had children under the age of 18 living with them, 64.8% were married couples living together, 11.3% had a female householder with no husband present, and 21.4% were non-families. 18.0% of all households were made up of individuals, and 5.5% had someone living alone who was 65 years of age or older. The average household size was 2.77 and the average family size was 3.15.

31.5% are under the age of 18, 7.0% from 18 to 24, 30.2% from 25 to 44, 23.8% from 45 to 64, and 7.5% who were 65 years of age or older. The median age was 35 years. For every 100 females, there were 94.1 males. For every 100 females age 18 and over, there were 92.0 males.

The median income for a household in the city was $54,167, and the median income for a family was $62,401. Males had a median income of $45,407 versus $23,285 for females. The per capita income for the city was $21,514. About 3.2% of families and 4.5% of the population were below the poverty line, including 7.8% of those under age 18 and none of those age 65 or over.

== Government ==
Eldridge has a mayor-council form of government with a mayor and five city council members. All council members are at-large. City council meetings are conducted bi-monthly on the first and third Mondays of each month at the Eldridge Community Center. The city is managed by a city administrator.

== Education ==
Eldridge hosts three of the seven public schools in the North Scott Community School District, which has its administrative offices there as well. The North Scott High School, North Scott Junior High and Ed White Elementary School are in Eldridge. The other four elementary schools in the district are in the outlying communities of Donahue, Long Grove, Park View and Princeton.

Residents are represented by a seven-member board of education, which conducts bi-monthly meetings on the second and fourth Mondays of each month at the Administration Center.

== Popular culture ==
In the 2012 film Promised Land, Matt Damon's character, Steve Butler, is from the area of Eldridge, Iowa.

== Notable people ==
- Beth Bader (born 1973), member of the LPGA
- Kari Lake (born 1969), the 2022 Republican nominee for Arizona Governor, and a 2024 United States Senate nominee, graduated from North Scott High School in Eldridge.
