= North Scott Community School District =

Public school district in Eldridge, Iowa, United States

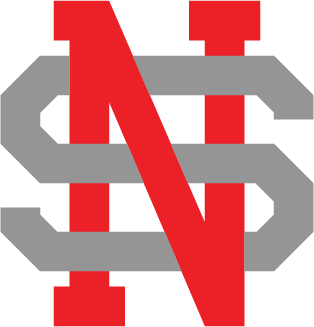

Location
- Eldridge, Iowa Scott County United States

District information
- Type: Local school district
- Grades: K-12
- Established: 1956
- Superintendent: Joe Stutting
- Schools: 7
- Budget: $44,410,000 (2020-21)
- NCES District ID: 1920940

Students and staff
- Students: 3463 (2022-23)
- Teachers: 223.98 FTE
- Staff: 230.22 FTE
- Student–teacher ratio: 15.46
- Athletic conference: Mississippi Athletic Conference
- District mascot: Lancers
- Colors: Scarlet and Silver

Other information
- Website: www.north-scott.k12.ia.us

The North Scott School District is a suburban public school district in Scott County, Iowa. Based in Eldridge, it spans 220 square miles (570 km^{2}) in northern Scott County, and serves the cities of Eldridge, Dixon, Donahue, Long Grove, Maysville, McCausland, Princeton, a portion of northern Davenport, and the surrounding rural areas. It also includes the Park View census-designated place.

== History ==
Because of its central location in the new district, Eldridge was selected as the site for a new junior-senior high school building. The southwest corner of LeClaire Road and South First Street, at the time the east edge of town. Construction began in 1957, and was completed in time for the 1958-1959 school year.

North Scott's first superintendent was Charles Hahn; the first high school principal was Melvin Heiler. Heiler would succeed Hahn in 1964 and guided the district through a period of great growth during the late 1960s and 1970s. He retired in 1980, a year after a successful push for the construction of a 900-seat fine arts auditorium at the high school.

Elementary students in kindergarten through sixth grades continued to attending either rural one-room schoolhouses in various parts of the county (or if they lived in town, an older school building). Students assigned to a particular building depending their grade level and where they lived in the district. By 1961, district leaders began the first of several attempts to pass a bond issue to replace these older school buildings with modern elementary schools. After several failed attempts, voters finally approved a measure in July 1965 to build four elementary buildings: one each in Eldridge, Donahue, Long Grove and Princeton. The elementary buildings were completed by 1967, with each of them named after astronauts (in paying homage to the space program). The older school buildings were either converted for private uses or abandoned.

North Scott's enrollment continued to surge in the early 1970s, with several district buildings receiving additions to accommodate this growth. A new junior high building was erected in Eldridge in 1975 (and opened in January 1976), while another elementary school building - in the fast-growing Park View - opened in the late summer of 1976. Several major additions have been completed to the high school through the years, most notably an auxiliary gymnasium in 1971, a fine arts auditorium in 1981, additional administrative offices in 1983, an expanded media center and computer labs in 1987 and a new science and fine arts wing in 1999. Each of the elementary schools and the junior high also received numerous additions in the late 1990s.

Dr. Tim Dose led the district as its superintendent from 2001 until his unexpected death on July 1, 2008. During his seven-year tenure as the district's top administrator, he was credited for leading the district through tough financial times, punctuated with the layoff of several teachers to offset declining revenue. He had most recently been a driving force in advocating the renewal of the district's physical plant and equipment levy and 1-cent local option sales tax, special funding mechanisms which provide school districts with extra revenue for building, technology and infrastructure projects. Dr. Dennis Rucker, who had served school districts in Illinois and Iowa during the past 30 years, was named interim superintendent a month later.

In March 2009, the school board named Jeff Schwiebert as its new superintendent. Schwiebert had served as superintendent of the Mount Vernon Community School District. During his time as superintendent, he oversaw the implementation of a facilities plan that included additions at the high school and several of the elementary schools, most notably a classroom and gymnasium addition at Ed White Elementary in Eldridge. That plan came into being after voters rejected an earlier proposal that included a second elementary school in Eldridge; there had been considerable community debate on the need for the second Eldridge elementary school and its possible impact on outlying schools. Schwiebert announced his retirement in January 2014, and two months later, Joe Stutting, who had been superintendent of the Sturgeon Bay (Wisconsin) School District, was named superintendent. Early in Stutting's tenure, a major expansion of Ed White Elementary School in Eldridge was completed.

Other superintendents during North Scott's history were Robert "Bear" Stevens (1980–1984), Douglas Otto (1984–1987) and Pascal V. "Pat" DeLuca (1987–2001).

== List of schools ==
=== High School ===
- North Scott High School, 200 S. First St., Eldridge.

=== Junior High School ===
- North Scott Junior High School, 502 S. Fifth St., Eldridge.

=== Elementary schools ===
- Alan Shepard Elementary School, 220 W. Grove St., Long Grove
- Edward White Elementary School, 121 S. Fifth St., Eldridge
- John Glenn Elementary School, 308 N. Main St., Donahue
- Neil Armstrong Elementary School, 212 S. Park View Drive, Park View
- Virgil Grissom Elementary School, 500 Lost Grove Road, Princeton

== Facts and figures ==
=== Enrollment ===
Year	District-wide	High schools	Junior high schools	Elementary schools	Other programs & adjustments
2005–2006	3,008.6	1,055	487	1,517	-50.4
2004–2005	2,972.4	1,073	489.1	1,461	-50.7
2003-2004	3,129	1,065	484	1,554	26
2002-2003	3,108	1,043	533	1,510	22
2001-2002	3,040	985	536	1,504	15
2000-2001	3,088	978	517	1,593	0

== See also ==
- Eldridge, Iowa
- Lists of school districts in the United States
- List of school districts in Iowa
