= Donahue, Iowa =

- City
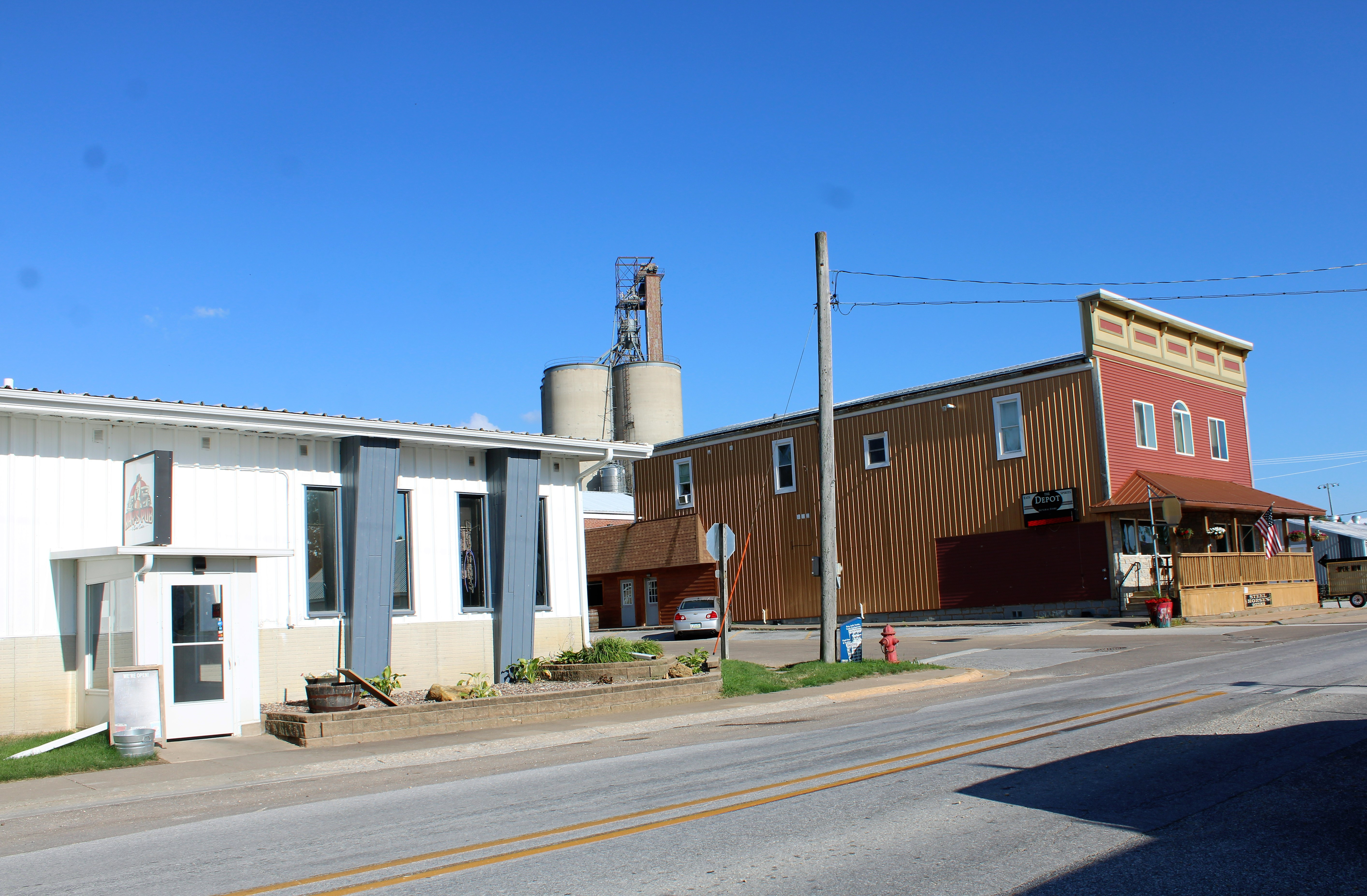
- Street scene in Donahue

- Location of Donahue, Iowa
- Coordinates: 41°41′30″N 90°40′29″W
- Country: United States
- State: Iowa
- County: Scott

Area
  - City: 0.36 sq mi (0.92 km^{2})
  - Land: 0.36 sq mi (0.92 km^{2})
  - Water: 0 sq mi (0.00 km^{2})
- Elevation: 709 ft (216 m)

Population (2020)
  - City: 335
  - Density: 944.5/sq mi (364.67/km^{2})
  - Metro: 382,630 (135th)
- Time zone: UTC-6 (Central (CST))
  - Summer (DST): UTC-5 (CDT)
- ZIP code: 52746
- Area code: 563
- FIPS code: 19-21720
- GNIS feature ID: 2394542
- Website: www.scottcountyiowa.com/cities/donahue.php

Donahue is a city in Scott County, Iowa, United States. The population was 335 at the 2020 census. The city has a mayor-council form of government.

== Education ==
Donahue is part of the North Scott Community School District, based in nearby Eldridge, and is home to one of the district's five elementary schools. Elementary-aged students attend John Glenn Elementary, while older students travel to Eldridge to attend either North Scott Junior High School or North Scott High School.

== Geography ==
According to the United States Census Bureau, the city has a total area of 0.35 square miles (0.91 km^{2}), all land.

== Demographics ==
Historical population
Year	Pop.	±%
1910	64	—
1920	101	+57.8%
1930	98	−3.0%
1940	89	−9.2%
1950	105	+18.0%
1960	133	+26.7%
1970	216	+62.4%
1980	289	+33.8%
1990	316	+9.3%
2000	293	−7.3%
2010	346	+18.1%
2020	335	−3.2%
Source:"U.S. Census website". United States Census Bureau. and Iowa Data Center; Source: U.S. Decennial Census

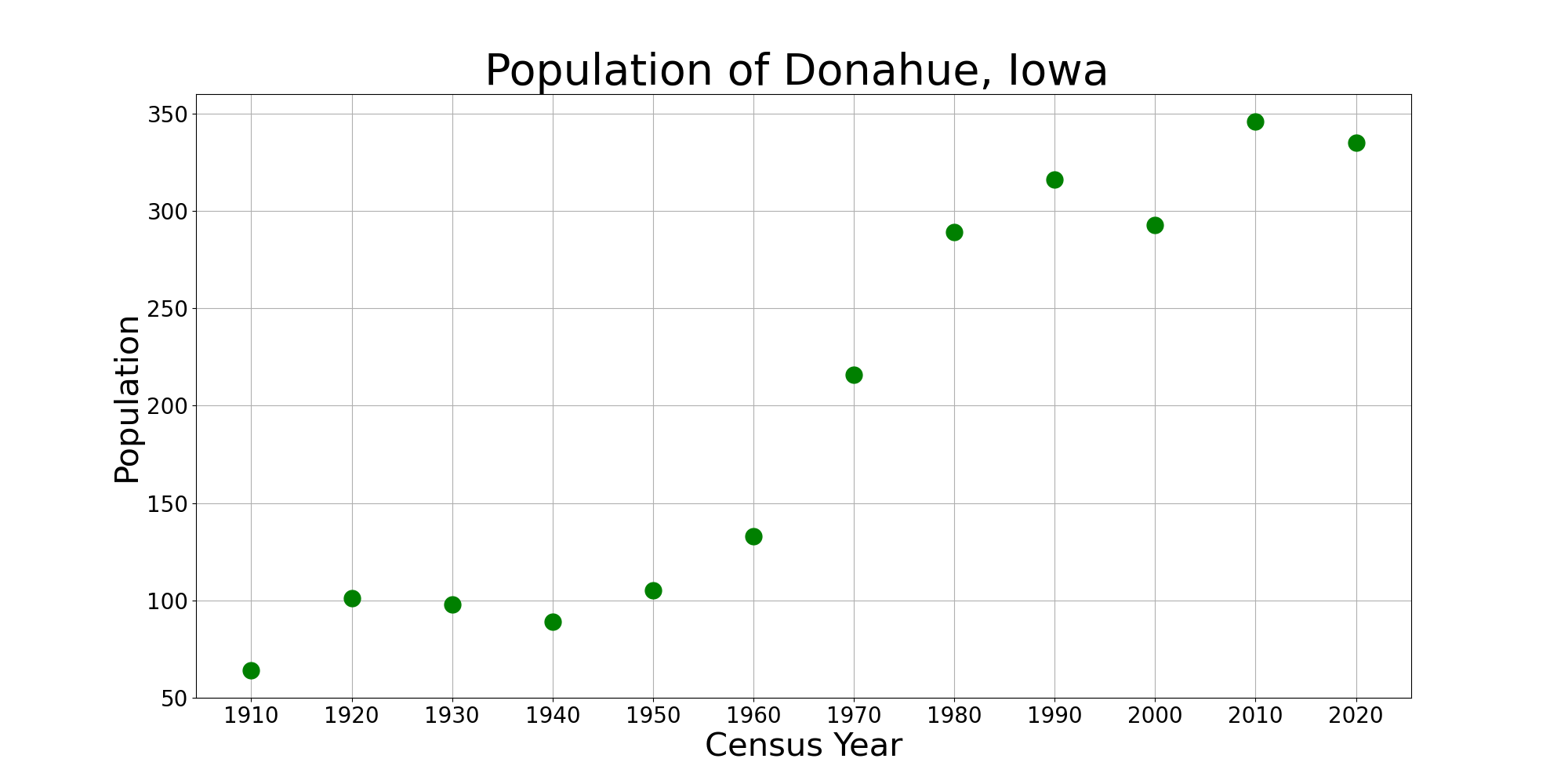
The population of Donahue, Iowa from US census data

=== 2020 census ===
As of the census of 2020, there were 335 people, 128 households, and 108 families residing in the city. The population density was 944.5 inhabitants per square mile (364.7/km^{2}). There were 129 housing units at an average density of 363.7 per square mile (140.4/km^{2}). The racial makeup of the city was 95.8% White, 0.0% Black or African American, 0.0% Native American, 0.0% Asian, 0.0% Pacific Islander, 0.3% from other races and 3.9% from two or more races. Hispanic or Latino persons of any race comprised 1.5% of the population.

Of the 128 households, 40.6% of which had children under the age of 18 living with them, 68.8% were married couples living together, 6.2% were cohabitating couples, 10.9% had a female householder with no spouse or partner present and 14.1% had a male householder with no spouse or partner present. 15.6% of all households were non-families. 11.7% of all households were made up of individuals, 3.9% had someone living alone who was 65 years old or older.

The median age in the city was 39.7 years. 27.2% of the residents were under the age of 20; 3.6% were between the ages of 20 and 24; 27.5% were from 25 and 44; 24.8% were from 45 and 64; and 17.0% were 65 years of age or older. The gender makeup of the city was 52.5% male and 47.5% female.

=== 2010 census ===
As of the census of 2010, there were 346 people, 124 households, and 97 families living in the city. The population density was 988.6 inhabitants per square mile (381.7/km^{2}). There were 127 housing units at an average density of 362.9 per square mile (140.1/km^{2}). The racial makeup of the city was 98.8% White, 0.3% African American, and 0.9% from two or more races. Hispanic or Latino of any race were 0.9% of the population.

There were 124 households, of which 46.8% had children under the age of 18 living with them, 69.4% were married couples living together, 4.0% had a female householder with no husband present, 4.8% had a male householder with no wife present, and 21.8% were non-families. 16.1% of all households were made up of individuals, and 4.8% had someone living alone who was 65 years of age or older. The average household size was 2.79 and the average family size was 3.14.

The median age in the city was 35.4 years. 30.9% of residents were under the age of 18; 2.6% were between the ages of 18 and 24; 32.1% were from 25 to 44; 25.8% were from 45 to 64; and 8.7% were 65 years of age or older. The gender makeup of the city was 47.1% male and 52.9% female.

=== 2000 census ===
As of the census of 2000, there were 293 people, 103 households, and 83 families living in the city. The population density was 870.6 inhabitants per square mile (336.1/km^{2}). There were 105 housing units at an average density of 312.0 per square mile (120.5/km^{2}). The racial makeup of the city was 99.66% White. Hispanic or Latino of any race were 0.34% of the population.

There were 103 households, out of which 35.9% had children under the age of 18 living with them, 71.8% were married couples living together, 4.9% had a female householder with no husband present, and 19.4% were non-families. 13.6% of all households were made up of individuals, and 4.9% had someone living alone who was 65 years of age or older. The average household size was 2.84 and the average family size was 3.13.

28.3% are under the age of 18, 7.2% from 18 to 24, 31.1% from 25 to 44, 24.6% from 45 to 64, and 8.9% who were 65 years of age or older. The median age was 36 years. For every 100 females, there were 109.3 males. For every 100 females age 18 and over, there were 107.9 males.

The median income for a household in the city was $56,250, and the median income for a family was $63,542. Males had a median income of $43,750 versus $21,583 for females. The per capita income for the city was $24,895. About 5.1% of families and 11.0% of the population were below the poverty line, including 23.2% of those under the age of eighteen and 7.7% of those 65 or over.

== Notable people ==
- Chris Brase, Iowa State Senator
- Kari Lake, 2022 Republican nominee for Arizona Governor, grew up in Donahue
