= Alexander Brownlie House =

Historic house in Iowa, United States

- U.S. National Register of Historic Places
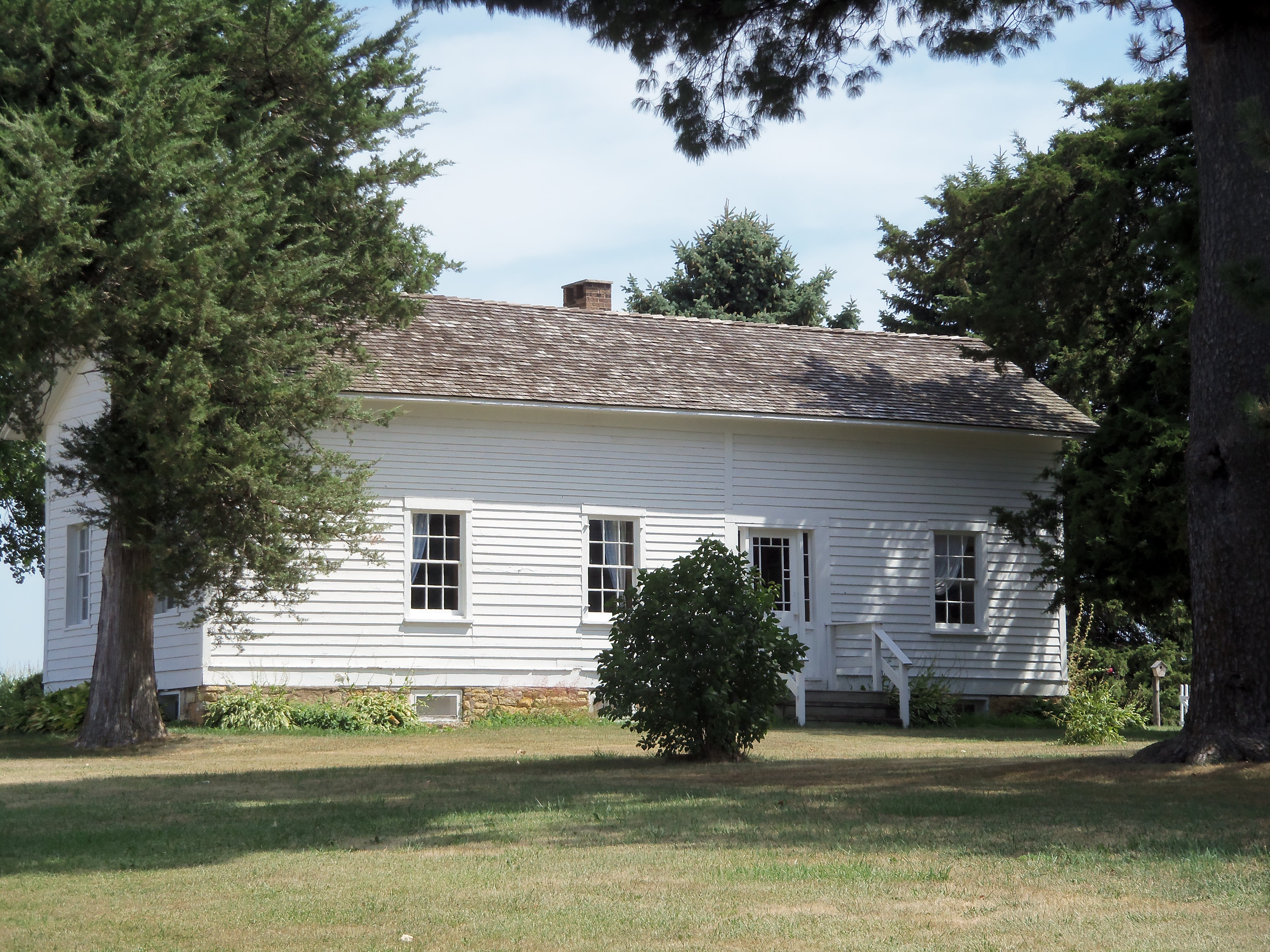

- Location within Iowa Location within the United States
- Location: 206 Pine St. Long Grove, Iowa
- Coordinates: 41°42′03″N 90°35′05″W
- Built: 1839, 1846
- Architect: Alexander Brownlie
- Architectural style: Vernacular
- NRHP reference No.: 76000809
- Added to NRHP: December 22, 1976

The Alexander Brownlie House, also known as the Sod House, is a historical structure located in Long Grove, Iowa, United States. It has been listed on the National Register of Historic Places since 1976.

== History ==
The significance of the Brownlie House is found in its development as rural architecture from the pioneer era to the early 20th century. Alexander Brownlie and his brother James settled this part of Scott County in the late 1830s. The first section of the house was completed by Alexander Brownlie in 1839 on a foundation of coursed limestone. The structure was composed of bricks made of molded clay and grass. Lathe was then attached to the bricks by using square nails and it was covered with plaster. The exterior was covered with clapboard.

An addition was built onto the east side in 1846. It was a 2 1/2-story frame structure with brick nogging. The original chimney was removed and replaced with a connecting doorway between the original house and the addition. The main entrance into the house was moved to the right, yet it remains on the original structure. A third addition was added after 1893 on the north side, which gave the structure an L-shaped floor plan. It too was of frame construction. In subsequent years the second floor and the third addition have been removed.
