= Walnut Grove Pioneer Village =

Open-air museum in Iowa, United States

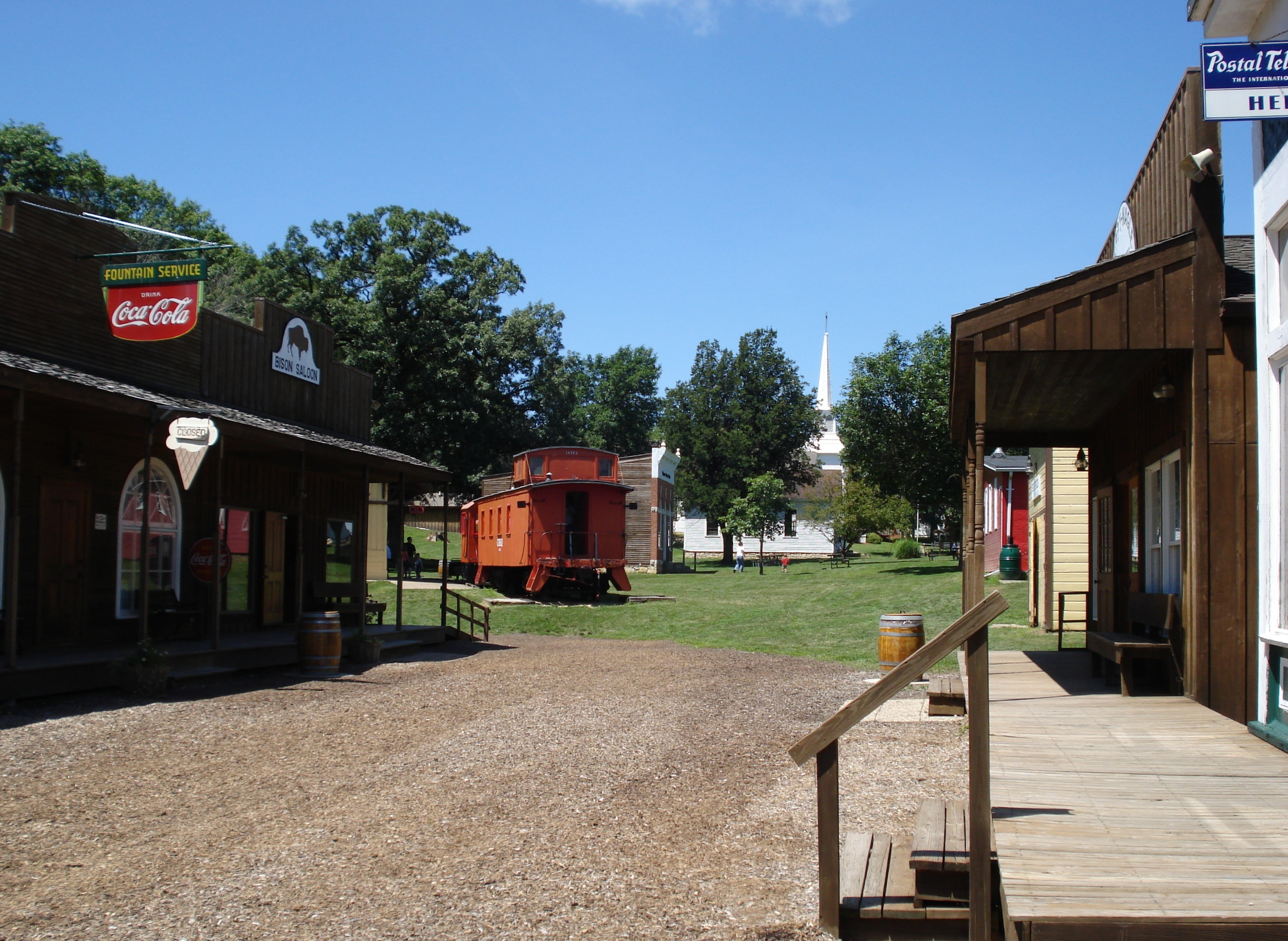
- Location: 18817 290th Street, Long Grove, Scott County, Iowa
- Coordinates: 41.7274°N 90.5312°W
- Website: Official website

The Dan Nagle Walnut Grove Pioneer Village is an open-air museum located at the north edge of Scott County Park, four miles northeast of Long Grove in Scott County, Iowa. The village is a re-creation of an 1860s Scott County cross-roads settlement and stage coach stop, is made up of 22 historic buildings, some of which have been relocated from rural Scott County, including an old church, a bank, a train depot and boardwalk of shops, which includes a soda and ice cream shop open in the summer.

== Harvest Moon Song and Dance Fest ==
The Harvest Moon Song and Dance Fest is held annually at the museum.
