= Community Building (Princeton, Iowa) =

- U.S. National Register of Historic Places
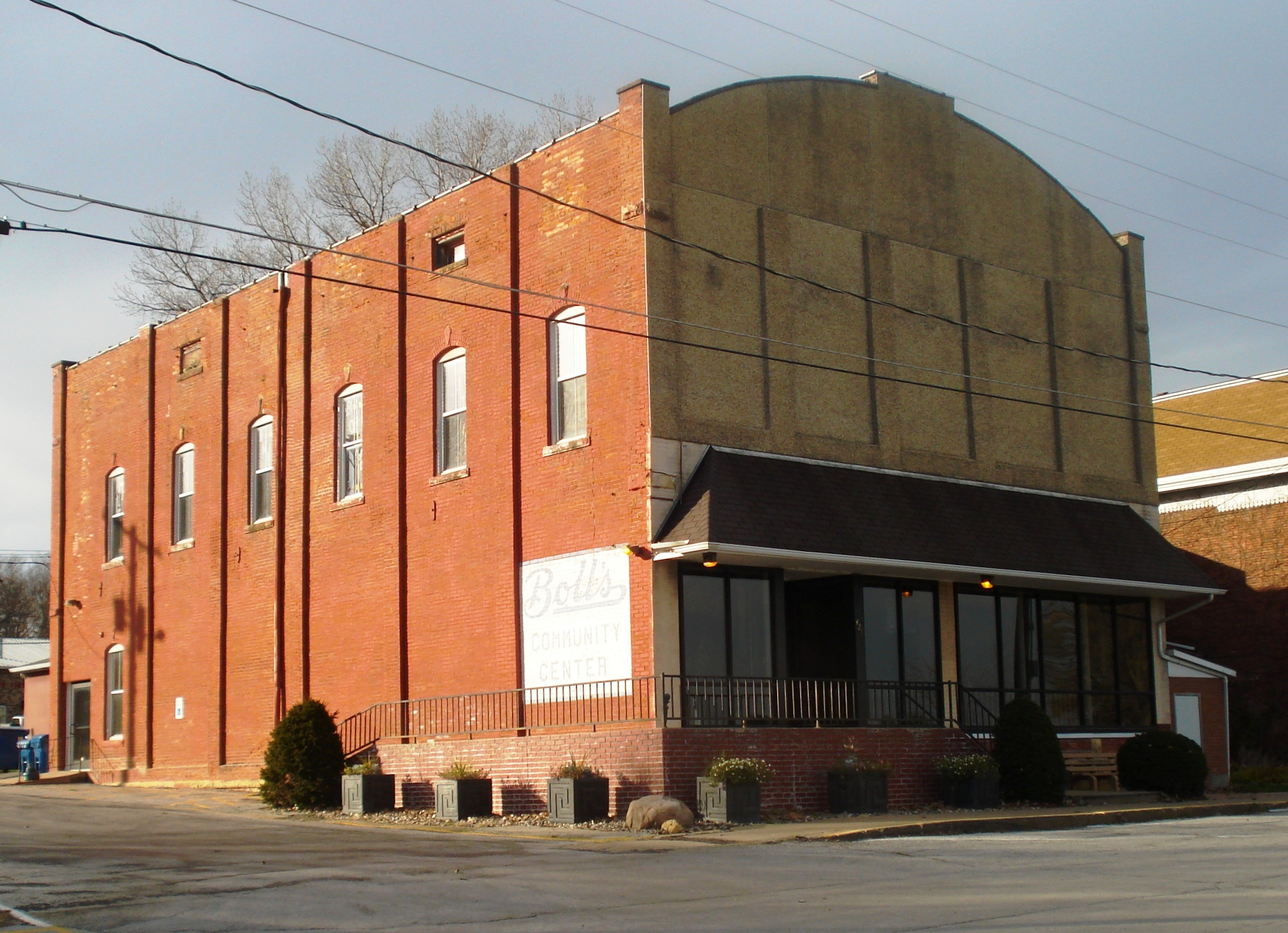

- Location within Iowa Location within the United States
- Location: 428 S. River Dr. Princeton, Iowa
- Coordinates: 41°40′18.992″N 90°20′24.36″W
- Area: less than 1 acre (0.40 ha)
- Built: 1928
- Architect: Daniel Harring Company (remodel)
- Architectural style: Early Commercial
- NRHP reference No.: 08000331
- Added to NRHP: April 25, 2008

The Community Building, also known as Community Hall, Boll's Store, or Boll's Community Center, is a building in Princeton, Iowa, United States. It was listed on the National Register of Historic Places in 2008.

== History ==
The Community Building was partially constructed by Dr. John Knox as a three-story building as funds were made available to him. He planned for the building to house stores, offices, a ballroom, and a hospital. He never completed the building, however. He began construction in 1903 for a two-story structure before his local funding ran out. He was able to find investors in nearby Le Claire, Iowa and was able to complete a third floor and the roof before his funding ran out again. Knox could not secure any more funding for his project so the building's shell, without windows, sat empty while community leaders tried for 20 years to acquire and complete the project. The Community Building Company was formed in 1928, and they bought the structure and completed construction of the building for use by the local community. The Daniel Harring Company from Clinton, Iowa was hired to remodel the structure to make it two stories tall. When it was completed, the building featured a finished basement with a kitchen, two commercial storefronts, and an auditorium/hall with a stage on the second floor. So that the second story could have greater height, it incorporated the lower portion of the original third story. A community affair, which included a chicken dinner, speaker, carnival, and dance, opened the facility on November 22, 1928.

A variety of community functions were held in the Community Building as planned. Dances, plays, movies, and meetings were held in the hall on the second floor. The local Presbyterian and Lutheran churches held their chicken suppers in the basement. The International Order of Odd Fellows (I.O.O.F) held five shares in the Community Building Company. They, and their associated women's group the Rebekahs, held their regular meetings in the building. In February 1930 a local basketball team began to use the hall for a fee of $5 per game night and 40% of the proceeds over $7. The team installed the necessary equipment at their own expense. Use of the facility began to decline in the 1950s.

Initially, the dining room and its equipment could be rented for $10, the hall on the second floor was rented on a regular night for $15, or $25 for holidays, and the first floor retail spaces could be rented per month for $20 each. Henry (Heinie) W. Boll, who ran a general store in town, agreed to rent both spaces for $40 per month. He was able to remove part of the wall that divided the space and create a single store. Boles rent declined during the Great Depression to $30 a month, and by 1961 he was paying $85 a month. He continued to rent the retail space in the building until 1963 when he bought the building from the Community Building Company. He handed the building over to his son Merle in 1972 and he operated the store until he sold the building to the city of Princeton in 1997. A few events were held in the hall or basement while the Boll's owned the building, but for the most part, it sat empty. The city renovated the building and in 1998 it re-opened as Princeton's community center.

== Architecture ==
The Community Building is a two-story, five bay brick structure that was built on a stone foundation. It is capped with a barrel vault roof. The building was designed in the Early Commercial architectural style. The main facade on the building's east elevation features a distinctive arched parapet wall, with center and side crenellations. There were initially two entrances, one into each of the two storefronts, but the north entry was eliminated in 1963. By 1973 the brick wall on the second floor began to deteriorate so stucco was applied to secure the brick and the facade. The concrete handicap ramp with a brick veneer and a low metal rail was added when the city renovated the building. The south elevation is divided into six bays by brick pilasters. Originally, it had a wider entry door at the rear for entry into the basement level and the second-floor hall. What was a double-door entry has been reduced to a single door in subsequent years. A single-story, concrete block addition was built around 1963 onto the rear of the building for additional storage space for the Boll's Store. The addition features a gable roof.
