= Park View, Iowa =

- CDP
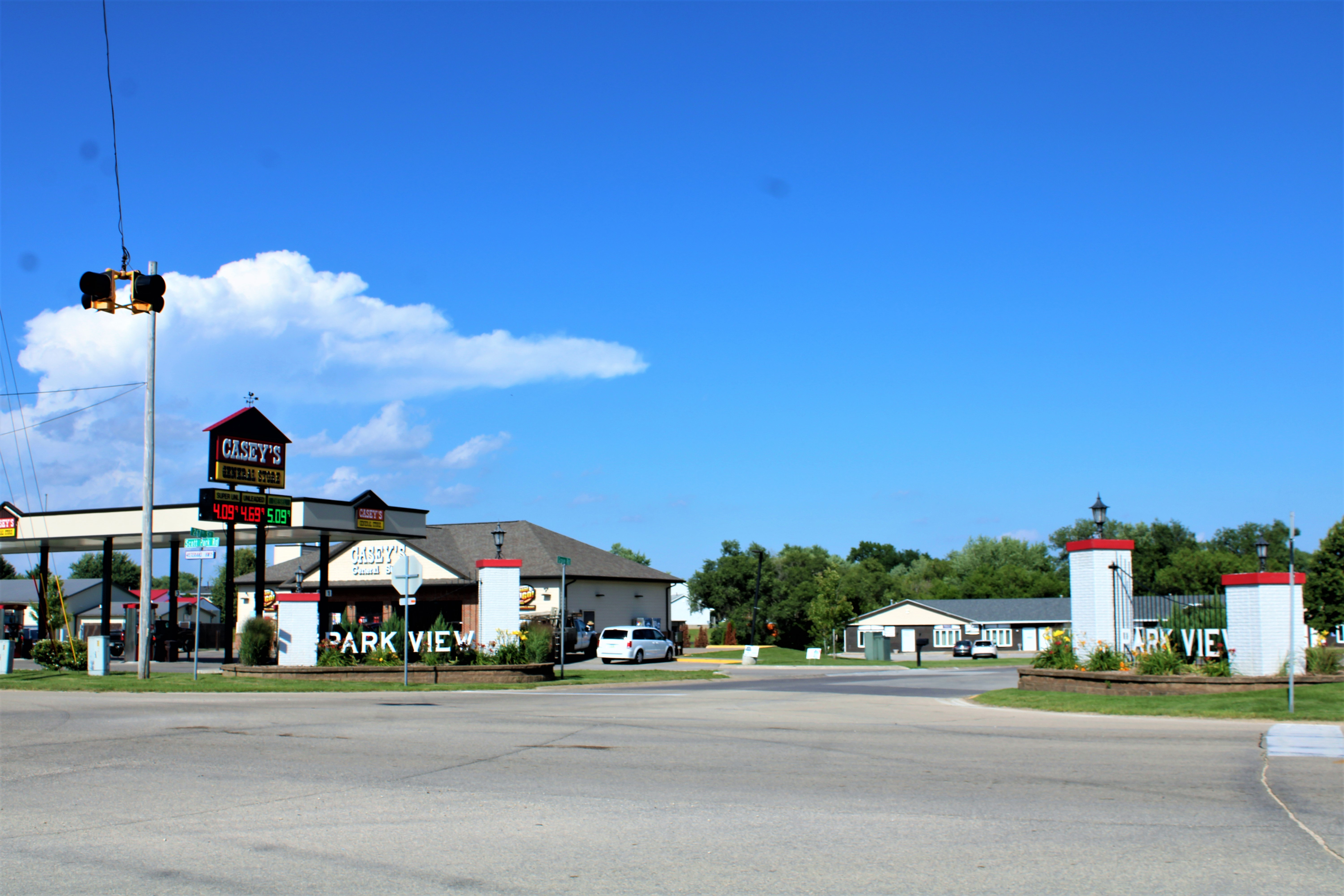
- The main entrance into the community.

- Location of Park View, Iowa
- Coordinates: 41°41′43″N 90°32′22″W
- Country: USA
- State: Iowa
- County: Scott

Area
  - Total: 1.48 sq mi (3.84 km^{2})
  - Land: 1.47 sq mi (3.82 km^{2})
  - Water: 0.0039 sq mi (0.01 km^{2})
- Elevation: 755 ft (230 m)

Population (2020)
  - Total: 2,709
  - Density: 1,835/sq mi (708.6/km^{2})
- Time zone: UTC-6 (Central (CST))
  - Summer (DST): UTC-5 (CDT)
- ZIP code: 52748
- Area code: 563
- FIPS code: 19-61725
- GNIS feature ID: 2393178

Park View is a census-designated place (CDP) in Scott County, Iowa, United States. The population was 2,709 at the time of the 2020 census; up from 2,389 at the 2010 census.

== Geography ==
According to the United States Census Bureau, the CDP has a total area of 1.1 square miles (2.8 km^{2}), all land.

== Demographics ==
Historical population
Census	Pop.	Note	%±
1990	808		—
2000	2,169		168.4%
2010	2,389		10.1%
2020	2,709		13.4%
Iowa Data Center

=== 2020 census ===
As of the 2020 census, there were 2,709 people, 956 households, and 753 families residing in the community. The population density was 1,835.3 inhabitants per square mile (708.6/km^{2}). There were 1,023 housing units at an average density of 693.0 per square mile (267.6/km^{2}).

The median age was 33.9 years. 31.6% of residents were under the age of 18 and 12.3% were 65 years of age or older. For every 100 females there were 93.1 males, and for every 100 females age 18 and over there were 92.1 males age 18 and over.

Of households, 43.7% had children under the age of 18 living in them. Of all households, 60.6% were married-couple households, 12.3% were households with a male householder and no spouse or partner present, 20.2% were households with a female householder and no spouse or partner present, and 6.9% were cohabitating-couple households. Non-family households made up 21.2% of all households. About 16.4% of all households were made up of individuals, and 6.1% had someone living alone who was 65 years of age or older.

Of all housing units, 6.5% were vacant. The homeowner vacancy rate was 0.9% and the rental vacancy rate was 13.3%.

0.0% of residents lived in urban areas, while 100.0% lived in rural areas.

Racial composition as of the 2020 census
Race	Number	Percent
White	2,301	84.9%
Black or African American	197	7.3%
American Indian and Alaska Native	3	0.1%
Asian	11	0.4%
Native Hawaiian and Other Pacific Islander	0	0.0%
Some other race	20	0.7%
Two or more races	177	6.5%
Hispanic or Latino (of any race)	99	3.7%

=== 2000 census ===
As of the census of 2000, there were 2,169 people, 758 households, and 580 families residing in the CDP. The population density was 2,006.5 inhabitants per square mile (774.7/km^{2}). There were 800 housing units at an average density of 740.1 per square mile (285.8/km^{2}). The racial makeup of the CDP was 96.96% White, 0.55% African American, 0.32% Native American, 0.60% Asian, 0.55% from other races, and 1.01% from two or more races. Hispanic or Latino of any race were 1.15% of the population.

There were 758 households, out of which 49.2% had children under the age of 18 living with them, 62.0% were married couples living together, 10.6% had a female householder with no husband present, and 23.4% were non-families. 17.4% of all households were made up of individuals, and 2.2% had someone living alone who was 65 years of age or older. The average household size was 2.86 and the average family size was 3.25.

In the CDP, the population was spread out, with 33.6% under the age of 18, 9.8% from 18 to 24, 34.8% from 25 to 44, 18.3% from 45 to 64, and 3.6% who were 65 years of age or older. The median age was 29 years. For every 100 females, there were 104.0 males. For every 100 females age 18 and over, there were 100.8 males.

The median income for a household in the CDP was $51,000, and the median income for a family was $55,341. Males had a median income of $39,152 versus $27,456 for females. The per capita income for the CDP was $18,649. None of the families and 1.0% of the population were living below the poverty line, including no under eighteens and none of those over 64.

== Education ==
Park View is part of the North Scott Community School District. Elementary-aged students from the area attend Neil Armstrong Elementary. Junior high and high school students attend the North Scott Junior High and North Scott High School located in Eldridge.

== Government ==
Park View is unincorporated at this time. It is primarily governed by the Scott County Government.
