= McCausland, Iowa =

- City
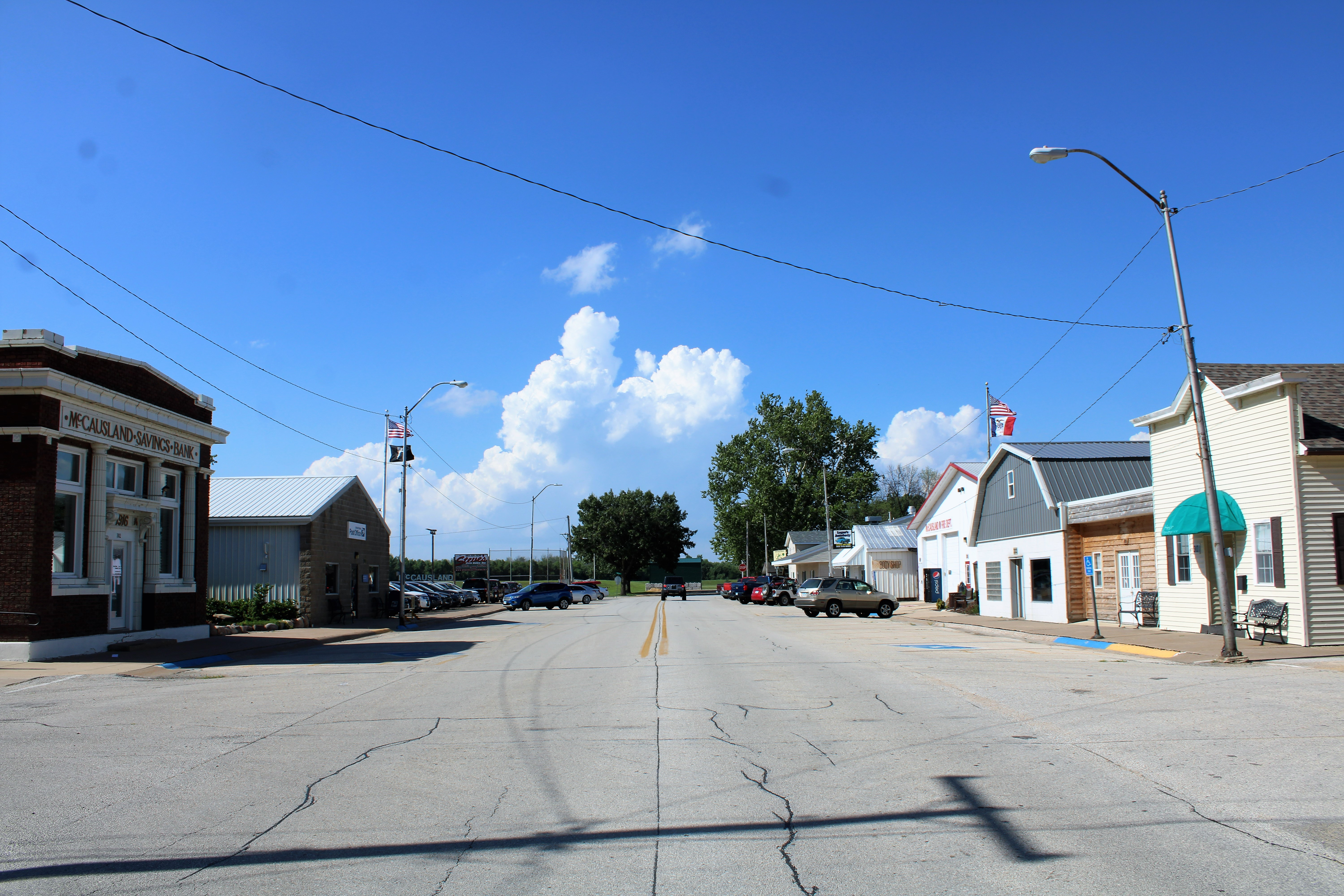
- Street scene in McCausland

- Location of McCausland, Iowa
- Coordinates: 41°44′51″N 90°26′54″W
- Country: United States
- State: Iowa
- County: Scott

Area
  - Total: 0.58 sq mi (1.50 km^{2})
  - Land: 0.56 sq mi (1.44 km^{2})
  - Water: 0.023 sq mi (0.06 km^{2})
- Elevation: 610 ft (190 m)

Population (2020)
  - Total: 313
  - Density: 564.5/sq mi (217.96/km^{2})
- Time zone: UTC-6 (Central (CST))
  - Summer (DST): UTC-5 (CDT)
- ZIP code: 52758
- Area code: 563
- FIPS code: 19-47820
- GNIS feature ID: 2395059
- Website: cityofmccausland.com

McCausland is a city in Butler Township, Scott County, Iowa, United States. The population was 313 at the time of the 2020 census.

The city was founded in 1882 by D.C. McCausland, a landowner and horse trader.

== Geography ==
According to the United States Census Bureau, the city has a total area of 0.56 square miles (1.45 km^{2}), of which 0.54 square miles (1.40 km^{2}) is land and 0.02 square miles (0.05 km^{2}) is water.

== Demographics ==
Historical populations
Year	Pop.	±%
1910	106	—
1920	110	+3.8%
1930	104	−5.5%
1940	115	+10.6%
1950	150	+30.4%
1960	173	+15.3%
1970	226	+30.6%
1980	381	+68.6%
1990	308	−19.2%
2000	299	−2.9%
2010	291	−2.7%
2020	313	+7.6%
Source:"American FactFinder". United States Census Bureau. and Iowa Data Center; Source: U.S. Decennial Census

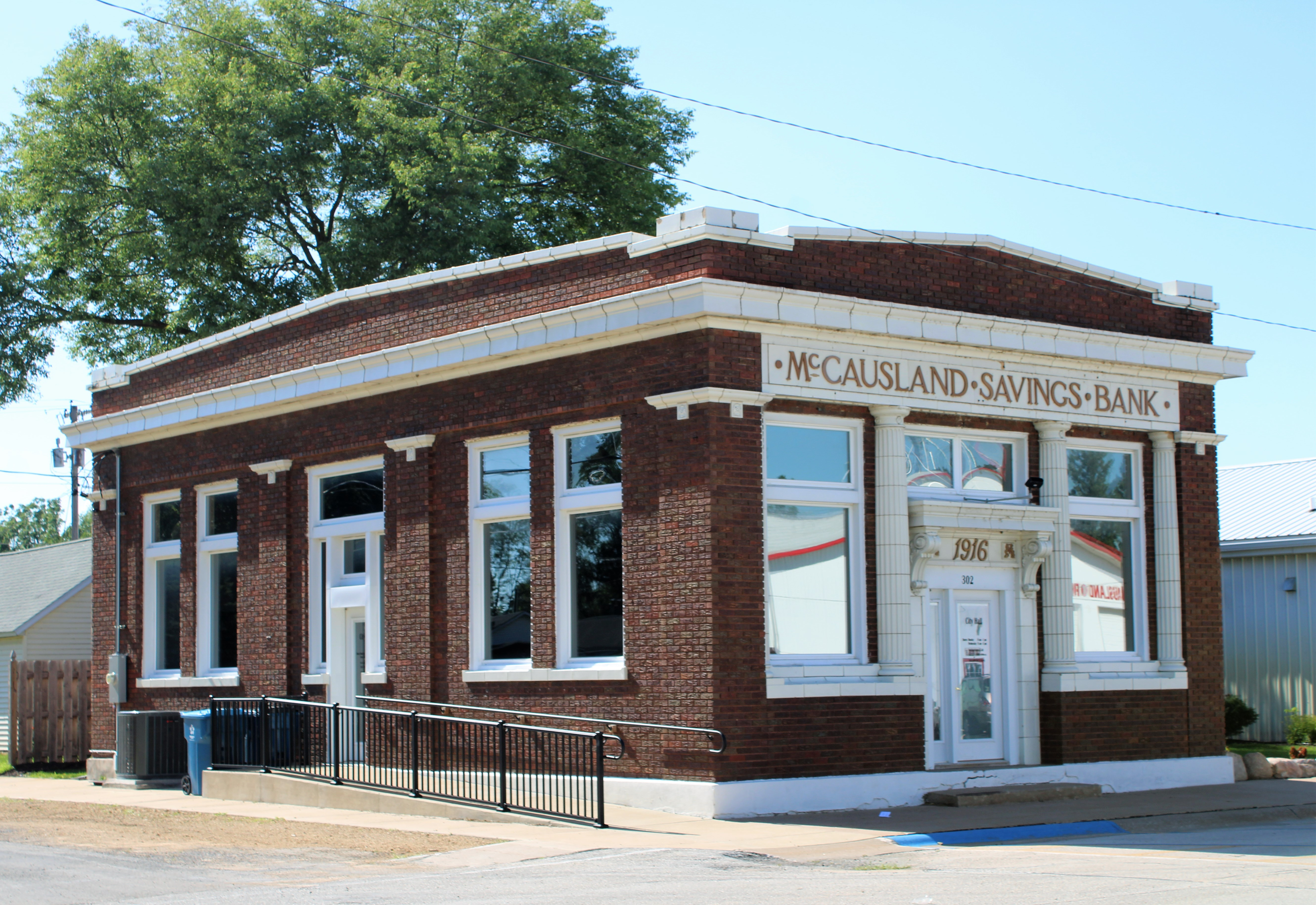
McCausland City Hall

=== 2020 census ===
As of the census of 2020, there were 313 people, 118 households, and 92 families residing in the city. The population density was 564.5 inhabitants per square mile (218.0/km^{2}). There were 128 housing units at an average density of 230.9 per square mile (89.1/km^{2}). The racial makeup of the city was 93.9% White, 0.0% Black or African American, 0.0% Native American, 0.0% Asian, 0.0% Pacific Islander, 0.3% from other races and 5.8% from two or more races. Hispanic or Latino persons of any race comprised 1.3% of the population.

Of the 118 households, 35.6% of which had children under the age of 18 living with them, 60.2% were married couples living together, 11.0% were cohabitating couples, 16.9% had a female householder with no spouse or partner present and 11.9% had a male householder with no spouse or partner present. 22.0% of all households were non-families. 13.6% of all households were made up of individuals, 5.9% had someone living alone who was 65 years old or older.

The median age in the city was 38.9 years. 27.2% of the residents were under the age of 20; 3.5% were between the ages of 20 and 24; 26.2% were from 25 and 44; 27.2% were from 45 and 64; and 16.0% were 65 years of age or older. The gender makeup of the city was 52.7% male and 47.3% female.

=== 2010 census ===
As of the census of 2010, there were 291 people, 115 households, and 86 families living in the city. The population density was 538.9 inhabitants per square mile (208.1/km^{2}). There were 123 housing units at an average density of 227.8 per square mile (88.0/km^{2}). The racial makeup of the city was 97.9% White, 0.7% from other races, and 1.4% from two or more races. Hispanic or Latino of any race were 1.7% of the population.

There were 115 households, of which 36.5% had children under the age of 18 living with them, 66.1% were married couples living together, 5.2% had a female householder with no husband present, 3.5% had a male householder with no wife present, and 25.2% were non-families. 20.0% of all households were made up of individuals, and 7% had someone living alone who was 65 years of age or older. The average household size was 2.53 and the average family size was 2.90.

The median age in the city was 40.1 years. 22.3% of residents were under the age of 18; 6.3% were between the ages of 18 and 24; 29.9% were from 25 to 44; 28.8% were from 45 to 64; and 12.7% were 65 years of age or older. The gender makeup of the city was 49.8% male and 50.2% female.

=== 2000 census ===
As of the census of 2000, there were 299 people, 117 households, and 84 families living in the city. The population density was 559.5 inhabitants per square mile (216.0/km^{2}). There were 120 housing units at an average density of 224.6 per square mile (86.7/km^{2}). The racial makeup of the city was 99.00% White, 0.33% Native American, and 0.67% from two or more races. Hispanic or Latino of any race were 0.33% of the population.

There were 117 households, out of which 36.8% had children under the age of 18 living with them, 62.4% were married couples living together, 6.8% had a female householder with no husband present, and 27.4% were non-families. 23.9% of all households were made up of individuals, and 11.1% had someone living alone who was 65 years of age or older. The average household size was 2.56 and the average family size was 3.06.

25.4% are under the age of 18, 9.0% from 18 to 24, 31.1% from 25 to 44, 24.4% from 45 to 64, and 10.0% who were 65 years of age or older. The median age was 34 years. For every 100 females, there were 104.8 males. For every 100 females age 18 and over, there were 99.1 males.

The median income for a household in the city was $34,531, and the median income for a family was $40,313. Males had a median income of $26,667 versus $24,688 for females. The per capita income for the city was $22,426. About 1.4% of families and 6.3% of the population were below the poverty line, including 11.7% of those under the age of eighteen and 3.0% of those 65 or over.

== Education ==
McCausland is part of the North Scott Community School District, which spans 220 square miles (570 km^{2}) in northern Scott County.
