= Long Grove, Iowa =

- City
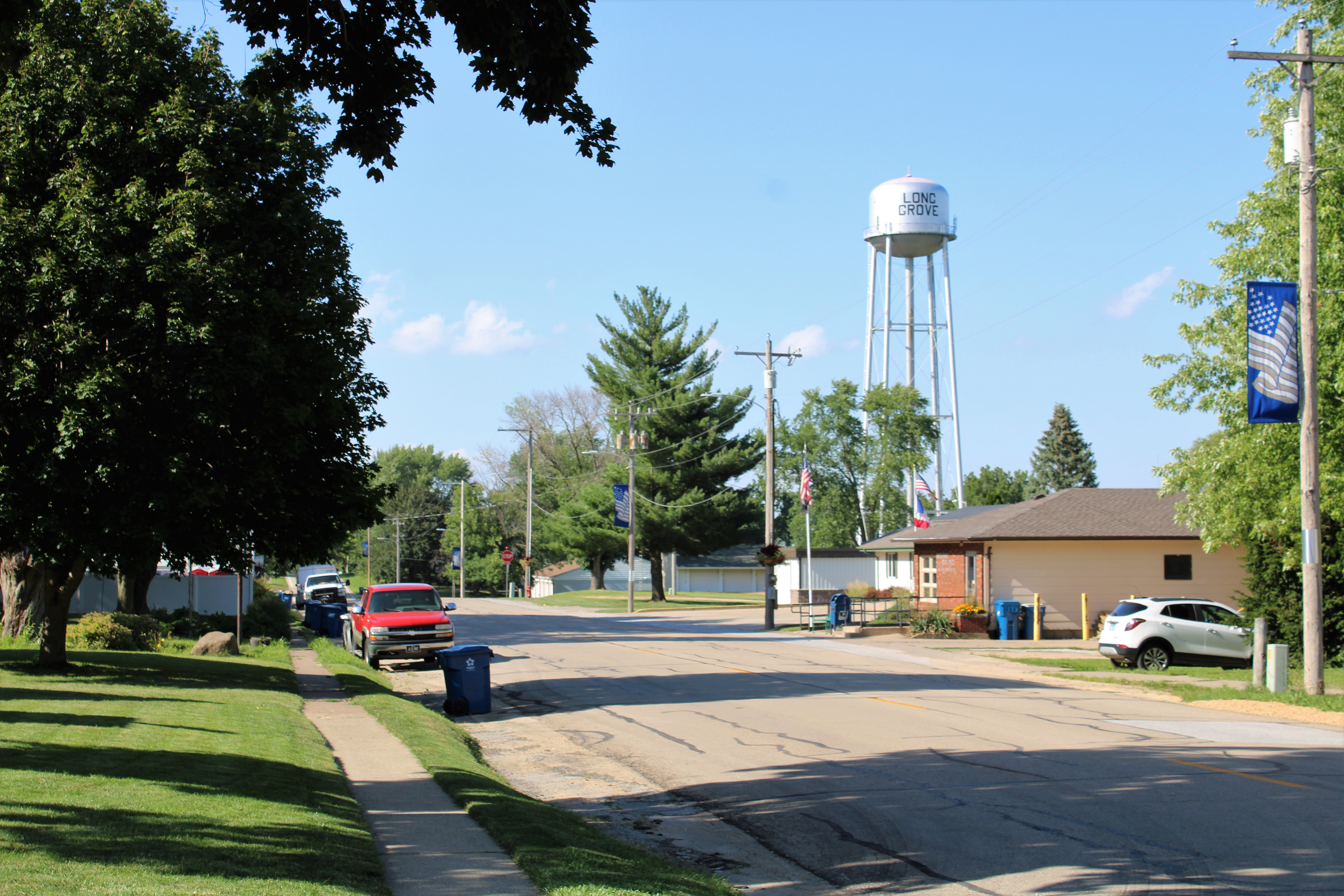
- Street scene and water tower in Long Grove

- Location of Long Grove, Iowa
- Coordinates: 41°41′32″N 90°34′49″W
- Country: United States
- State: Iowa
- County: Scott

Area
  - City: 1.15 sq mi (2.98 km^{2})
  - Land: 1.15 sq mi (2.98 km^{2})
  - Water: 0 sq mi (0.00 km^{2})
- Elevation: 797 ft (243 m)

Population (2020)
  - City: 838
  - Density: 727.9/sq mi (281.03/km^{2})
  - Metro: 382,630 (135th)
- Time zone: UTC-6 (Central (CST))
  - Summer (DST): UTC-5 (CDT)
- ZIP code: 52756
- Area code: 563
- FIPS code: 19-46425
- GNIS feature ID: 2395754
- Website: www.longgroveia.org

Long Grove is a city in Scott County, Iowa, United States. The population was 838 at the time of the 2020 census.

== Geography ==
According to the United States Census Bureau, the city has a total area of 1.02 square miles (2.64 km^{2}), all land.

== Education ==
Long Grove is part of the North Scott Community School District, which spans 220 square miles (570 km^{2}) in northern Scott County. Elementary-aged students from the city and adjoining nearby areas attend Alan Shepard Elementary. Junior high and high school students attend the North Scott Junior High and North Scott High School located in Eldridge.

== Culture ==
Held the second Sunday each June, Long Grove’s famous Strawberry Festival kicks off at 9 am with the Strawberry Stampede – youth/competitive fitness footraces, followed by a parade at 11:15 am. Area strawberry farmers sell strawberries, and there are games for children and a variety of entertainment groups throughout the day.

Another attraction is the Alexander Brownlie House on the city's north side. The sod house was built by the Brownlie Brothers dates from Iowa's prairie days of the 1830s. The house, which is open for tours, is listed on the National Register of Historic Places.

Located approximately six miles north and east of Long Grove is the Dan Nagle Walnut Grove Pioneer Village, at the north edge of Scott County Park. The village, a re-creation of an 1860s Scott County cross-roads settlement and stage coach, is made up of 18 historic buildings including an old church, a bank, a train depot and boardwalk of shops.

Organizations include the Lion Grove Lions Club, the Long Grove Civic League, the Long Grove Sportsman's Club and the Cub Scouts.

== Government ==
Long Grove has a mayor-council form of government, which meets on the second Tuesday of each month at city hall.

== History ==
Alexander and James Brownlie came to the area in August 1838, having followed the Mississippi River to the mouth of the Wapsipinicon River, then west along its banks. The two purchased a nearby timber ridge from a man named Coats, settling the claim for $160 plus timberland and all the prairie they wished to own. The first log cabin was built shortly thereafter, in a cluster of trees at the east edge of the timber, just south of the original town site.

A stage road, from Davenport to DeWitt and Dubuque passed through the village and a blacksmith shop and harness shop once lined the streets.

In the late 1860s, the railroad was extended from Davenport to Long Grove and stopped at what was originally known as Noel Station, in honor of John T. Noel, pioneer, township trustee and civil servant. The town, which had not been platted, was finally platted in the 1890s, though on a very loose basis.

A major incident in the city's history took place in December 1921, with the robbery of the Stockman's Savings Bank. Stories varied on what transpired, but what is known is that the two suspects were killed by a posse immediately after they attempted to hold up the bank.

The city remained a quiet farming community for many years, but has seen growth in the past 35 years. Along with the opening of Alan Shepard Elementary School, many new homes have been built on all four sides of the city.

== Churches ==
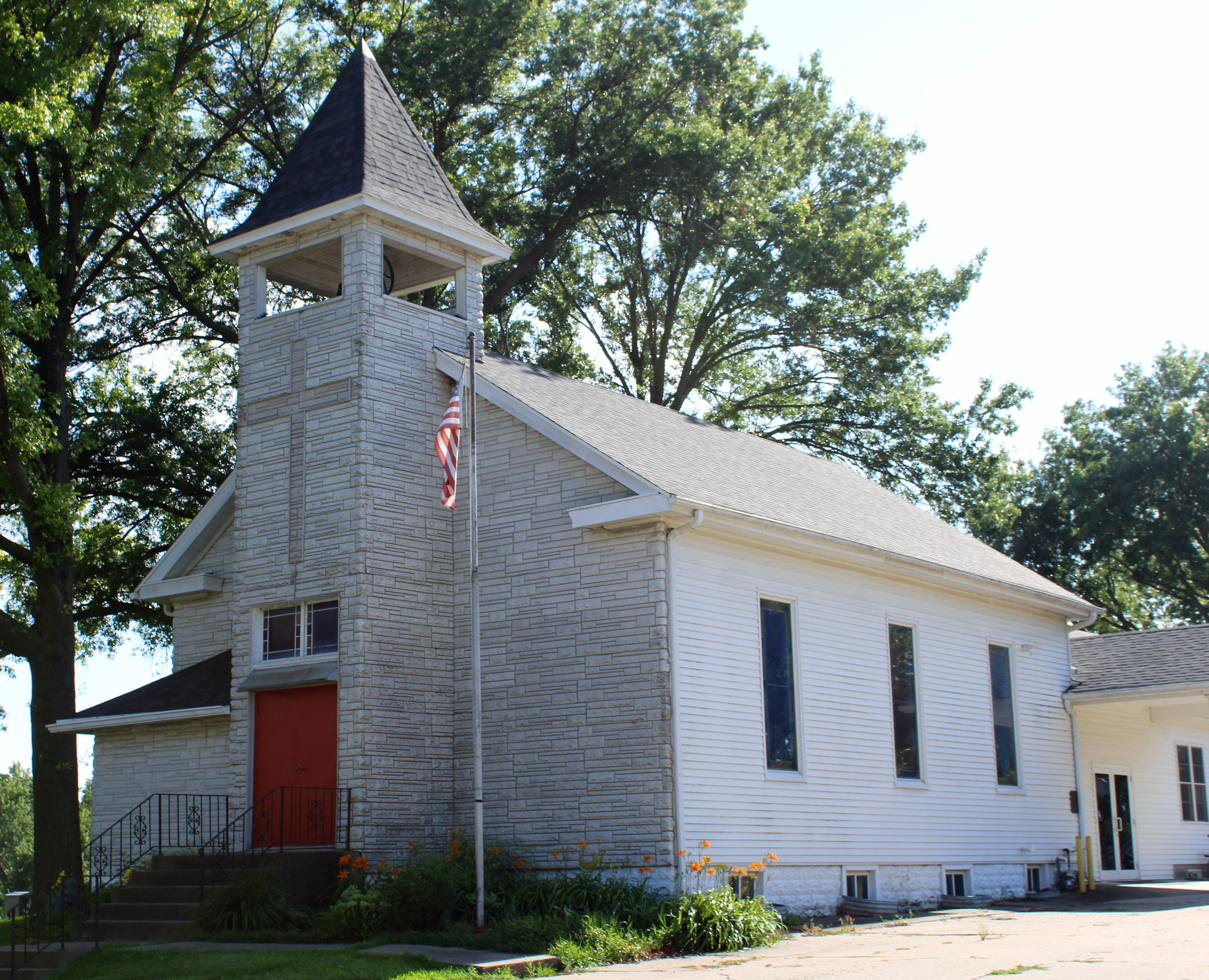
Long Grove Christian Church

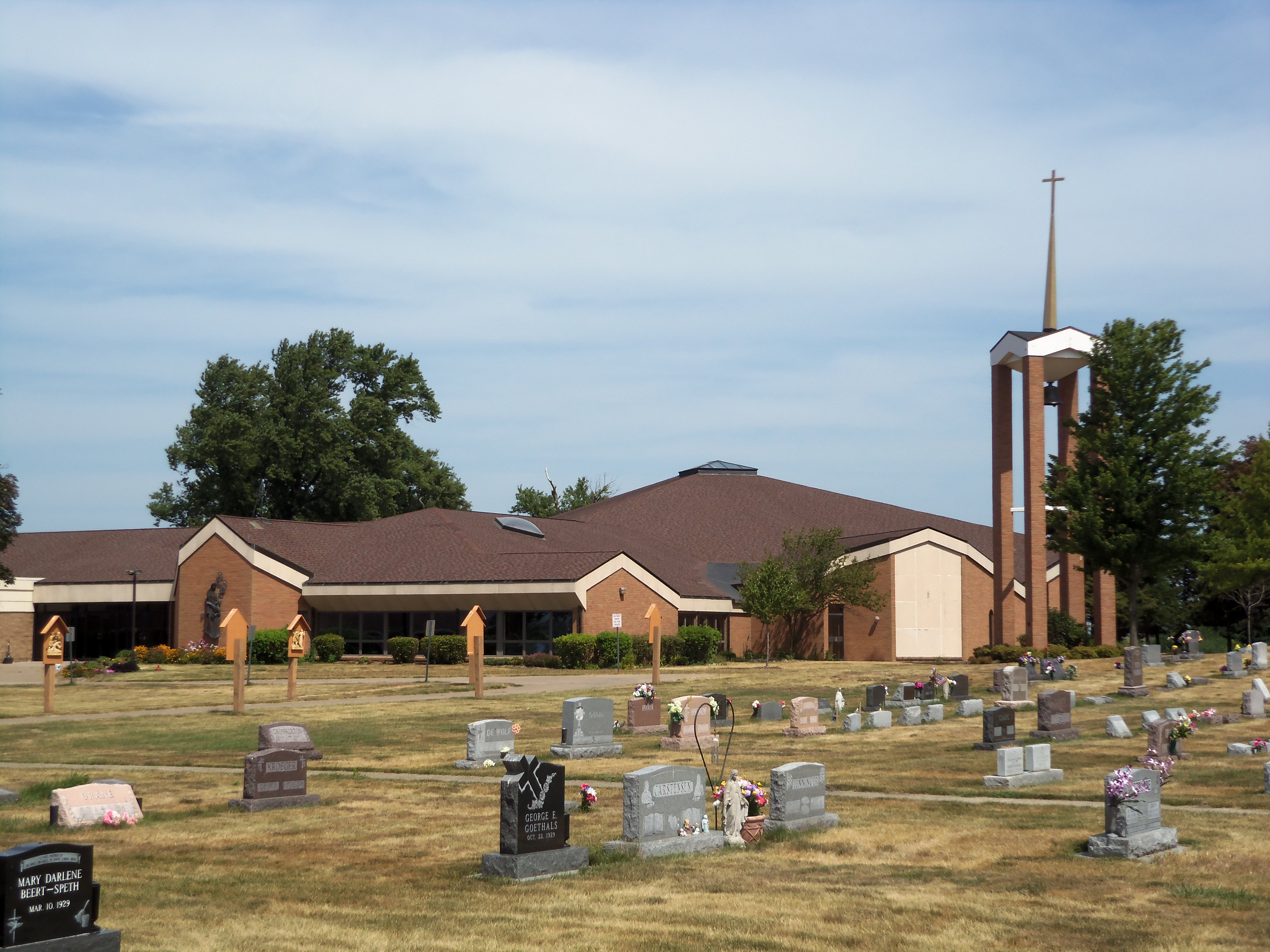
St. Ann's Catholic Church and Cemetery

Churches located in or near Long Grove are:

- Long Grove Christian Church.
- St. Ann's Catholic Church, two miles (3 km) north of the city limits.

== Demographics ==
Historical populations
Year	Pop.	±%
1920	158	—
1930	134	−15.2%
1940	139	+3.7%
1950	156	+12.2%
1960	182	+16.7%
1970	269	+47.8%
1980	596	+121.6%
1990	605	+1.5%
2000	597	−1.3%
2010	808	+35.3%
2020	838	+3.7%
Source:"American FactFinder". United States Census Bureau. and Iowa Data Center; Source: U.S. Decennial Census

=== 2020 census ===
As of the census of 2020, there were 838 people, 306 households, and 265 families residing in the city. The population density was 727.9 inhabitants per square mile (281.0/km^{2}). There were 313 housing units at an average density of 271.9 per square mile (105.0/km^{2}). The racial makeup of the city was 96.5% White, 0.5% Black or African American, 0.0% Native American, 0.0% Asian, 0.0% Pacific Islander, 0.5% from other races and 2.5% from two or more races. Hispanic or Latino persons of any race comprised 2.7% of the population.

Of the 306 households, 39.5% of which had children under the age of 18 living with them, 77.5% were married couples living together, 5.6% were cohabitating couples, 8.8% had a female householder with no spouse or partner present and 8.2% had a male householder with no spouse or partner present. 13.4% of all households were non-families. 10.8% of all households were made up of individuals, 5.6% had someone living alone who was 65 years old or older.

The median age in the city was 44.2 years. 26.8% of the residents were under the age of 20; 3.8% were between the ages of 20 and 24; 20.6% were from 25 and 44; 29.5% were from 45 and 64; and 19.2% were 65 years of age or older. The gender makeup of the city was 49.3% male and 50.7% female.

=== 2010 census ===
As of the census of 2010, there were 808 people, 281 households, and 244 families living in the city. The population density was 792.2 inhabitants per square mile (305.9/km^{2}). There were 287 housing units at an average density of 281.4 per square mile (108.6/km^{2}). The racial makeup of the city was 97.8% White, 0.2% Asian, 0.2% Pacific Islander, 0.2% from other races, and 1.5% from two or more races. Hispanic or Latino of any race were 3.3% of the population.

There were 281 households, of which 41.6% had children under the age of 18 living with them, 76.2% were married couples living together, 6.4% had a female householder with no husband present, 4.3% had a male householder with no wife present, and 13.2% were non-families. 11.4% of all households were made up of individuals, and 3.9% had someone living alone who was 65 years of age or older. The average household size was 2.88 and the average family size was 3.10.

The median age in the city was 41.1 years. 28.6% of residents were under the age of 18; 7.1% were between the ages of 18 and 24; 22.3% were from 25 to 44; 32.2% were from 45 to 64; and 9.7% were 65 years of age or older. The gender makeup of the city was 51.0% male and 49.0% female.

=== 2000 census ===
As of the census of 2000, there were 597 people, 205 households, and 175 families living in the city. The population density was 707.2 inhabitants per square mile (273.1/km^{2}). There were 208 housing units at an average density of 246.4 per square mile (95.1/km^{2}). The racial makeup of the city was 99.66% White, and 0.34% from two or more races. Hispanic or Latino of any race were 0.17% of the population.

There were 205 households, out of which 46.8% had children under the age of 18 living with them, 78.5% were married couples living together, 6.8% had a female householder with no husband present, and 14.6% were non-families. 12.2% of all households were made up of individuals, and 4.4% had someone living alone who was 65 years of age or older. The average household size was 2.91 and the average family size was 3.18.

31.2% were under the age of 18, 5.2% from 18 to 24, 28.6% from 25 to 44, 28.1% from 45 to 64, and 6.9% were 65 years of age or older. The median age was 38 years. For every 100 females, there were 102.4 males. For every 100 females age 18 and over, there were 104.5 males.

The median income for a household in the city was $65,250, and the median income for a family was $68,125. Males had a median income of $44,821 versus $30,156 for females. The per capita income for the city was $23,041. About 1.3% of families and 2.1% of the population were below the poverty line, including 0.5% of those under age 18 and 8.0% of those age 65 or over.

== Notable people ==
- Georges Le Marinel (1860–1914), American-born officer in the Belgian army, engineer, explorer and colonial administrator
- Paul Le Marinel, (1858–1912), brother of Georges, American-born officer in the Belgian army who became an explorer and administrator in the Congo Free State
