= List of new members of the 120th United States Congress =

The 120th United States Congress is the next meeting of the United States Congress. New members were elected in the November 2026 elections and will assume office on January 3, 2027.

== Senate ==
=== Taking office January 3, 2027 ===
State	Image	Senator	Seniority	Switched party	Prior background	Birth year	Ref
Alabama		Barry Moore (R)	3rd (TBD overall)	No; Open seat; replacing Tommy Tuberville (R)	U.S. House of Representatives; Alabama House of Representatives	1966	
Alaska		Mary Peltola (D)	6th (TBD overall)	Yes; Defeated Dan Sullivan (R)	U.S. House of Representatives (Note: Elected to the 117th and 118th Congress, serving at Alaska's at-large congressional district from 2022 to 2025.); Orutsararmiut Native Council Tribal Court; Alaska House of Representatives; Bethel City Council	1973	
Illinois		Juliana Stratton (D)	9th (TBD overall)	No; Open seat; replacing Dick Durbin (D)	Lieutenant Governor of Illinois; Illinois House of Representatives	1965	
Iowa		Josh Turek (D)	13th (TBD overall)	Yes; Open seat; replacing Joni Ernst (R)	Iowa House of Representatives; Paralympian wheelchair basketball player	1979	
Kansas		Adam Hamilton (D)	15th (TBD overall)	Yes; Defeated Roger Marshall (R)	Pastor of the United Methodist Church of the Resurrection	1964	
Kentucky		Andy Barr (R)	1st (TBD overall)	No; Open seat; replacing Mitch McConnell (R)	U.S. House of Representatives (Note: Elected to the 113th Congress, serving at Kentucky's 6th congressional district since 2013.); Lawyer	1973	
Louisiana		Julia Letlow (R)	4th (TBD overall)	No; Defeated Bill Cassidy (R) in a primary	U.S. House of Representatives (Note: Elected to the 117th Congress, serving at Louisiana's 5th congressional district since 2021.); Academic administrator	1981	
Maine		Troy Jackson (D)	16th (TBD overall)	Yes; Defeated Susan Collins (R)	President of the Maine Senate; Maine House of Representatives; Logger	1968	
Michigan		Abdul El-Sayed (D)	10th (TBD overall)	No; Open seat; replacing Gary Peters (D)	Epidemiologist; Public health administrator Academic	1984	
Minnesota		Peggy Flanagan (DFL)	11th (TBD overall)	No; Open seat; replacing Tina Smith (DFL)	Lieutenant Governor of Minnesota; Minnesota House of Representatives	1979	
Mississippi		Scott Colom (D)	14th (TBD overall)	Yes; Defeated Cindy Hyde-Smith (R)	District Attorney for the 16th Judicial District of Mississippi	1982	
Montana		Kurt Alme (R)	17th (TBD overall)	No; Open seat; replacing Steve Daines (R)	U.S. Attorney for the District of Montana	1966	
New Hampshire		Chris Pappas (D)	2nd (TBD overall)	No; Open seat; replacing Jeanne Shaheen (D)	U.S. House of Representatives (Note: Elected to the 116th Congress, serving at New Hampshire's 1st congressional district since 2019.); New Hampshire Executive Council; New Hampshire House of Representatives	1980	
North Carolina		Roy Cooper (D)	7th (TBD overall)	Yes; Open seat; replacing Thom Tillis (R)	Governor of North Carolina; Attorney General of North Carolina; North Carolina Senate; North Carolina House of Representatives	1957	
South Carolina		Annie Andrews (D)	12th (TBD overall)	Yes; Defeated Darline Graham (R)	Pediatrician	1980	
Texas		James Talarico (D)	8th (TBD overall)	Yes; Replacing John Cornyn (R), who was defeated in a primary	Texas House of Representatives; Educator	1989	
Wyoming		Harriet Hageman (R)	5th (TBD overall)	No; Open seat; replacing Cynthia Lummis (R)	U.S. House of Representatives (Note: Elected to the 118th Congress, serving at Wyoming's at-large congressional district since 2023.); Attorney	1962	

== House of Representatives ==
=== Taking office January 3, 2027 ===
District	Image	Representative	Switched party	Prior background	Birth year	Ref
Alabama 1		Jerry Carl (R)	No; Open seat; replacing Barry Moore (R)	U.S. House of Representatives (Note: Previously elected to the 117th, and 118th Congress, serving from 2021 to 2025.); Mobile County Commission	1958	
Arizona 1		Amish Shah (D)	Yes; Open seat; replacing David Schweikert (R)	Arizona House of Representatives	1977/1978	
Arizona 5		Mark Lamb (R)	No; Open seat; replacing Andy Biggs (R)	Pinal County Sheriff	1972	
Arizona 6		JoAnna Mendoza (D)	Yes; Defeated Juan Ciscomani (R)	United States Marine Corps	1975/1976	
California 1		Mike McGuire (D)	Yes; Defeated James Gallagher (R)	California Senate; Sonoma County Board of Supervisors	1979	
California 4		Eric Jones (D)	No; Defeated Mike Thompson (D)	Venture capitalist	1990	
California 6		Richard Pan (D)	Yes; Defeated Kevin Kiley (I)	California State Senate; California State Assembly	1965	
California 11		Scott Wiener (D)	No; Open seat; replacing Nancy Pelosi (D)	California State Senate; San Francisco Board of Supervisors	1970	
California 22		Randy Villegas (D)	Yes; Defeated David Valadao (R)	Visalia Unified School District Board of Education	1994	
California 26		Jacqui Irwin (D)	No; Open seat; replacing Julia Brownley (D)	California State Assembly	1962	
California 34		Angela Gonzales-Torres (D)	No; Defeated Jimmy Gomez (D)	Historic Highland Park Neighborhood Council; Community organizer	1994	
California 38		Hilda Solis (D)	No; Open seat; replacing Linda Sánchez (D), who was redistricted	Los Angeles County Board of Supervisors; U.S. House of Representatives (Note: Previously elected to the 107th to 111th Congress, serving from 2001 to 2009.); United States Secretary of Labor; California State Senate; California State Assembly	1957	
California 48		Marni von Wilpert (D)	Yes; Open seat; replacing Darrell Issa (R)	San Diego City Council	1982	
Colorado 1		Melat Kiros (D)	No; Defeated Diana DeGette (D) in a primary	Lawyer	1997	
Colorado 4		Eileen Laubacher (D)	Yes; Defeated Lauren Boebert (R)	United States Navy rear admiral United States National Security Council	1968/1969	
Colorado 5		Jessica Killin (D)	Yes; Defeated Jeff Crank (R)	Chief of staff and political aide United States Army	1973	
Colorado 8		Manny Rutinel (D)	Yes; Defeated Gabe Evans (R)	Colorado House of Representatives	1994	
Connecticut 1		Luke Bronin (D)	No; Defeated John B. Larson (D) in a primary	Mayor of Hartford	1979	
Florida 2		Austin Rogers (R)	No; Open seat; replacing Neal Dunn (R)	Attorney	1990/1991	
Florida 7		Ryan Elijah (R)	No; Defeated Cory Mills (R) in a primary	News anchor	1971	
Florida 11		Joe Strada (R)	No; Open seat; replacing Daniel Webster (R)	Businessman	1963	
Florida 16		Sydney Gruters (R)	No; Open seat; replacing Vern Buchanan (R)	Executive director for the New College Foundation; State director for the U.S. Department of Agriculture	1981/1982	
Florida 19		Jim Schwartzel (R)	No; Open seat; replacing Byron Donalds (R)	President of Sun Broadcasting; Owner of WFSX-FM	1976	
Florida 22		Pia Dandiya (D)	No; Open seat; replacing Lois Frankel (D), who was redistricted	Apple Strategic Innovations Group; Teach for America	1987	
Florida 24		Oliver Gilbert (D)	No; Open seat; replacing Frederica Wilson (D)	Miami-Dade County Commission; Mayor of Miami Gardens	1972	
Georgia 1		Jim Kingston (R)	No; Open seat; replacing Buddy Carter (R)	Insurance broker	1990	
Georgia 10		Houston Gaines (R)	No; Open seat; replacing Mike Collins (R)	Georgia House of Representatives	1995	
Georgia 11		John Cowan (R)	No; Open seat; replacing Barry Loudermilk (R)	Neurosurgeon	1975	
Georgia 13		Jasmine Clark (D)	No; Defeated Everton Blair (D) in a primary (Note: Elected in the special election to replace David Scott.) (Note: Blair had already lost nomination in the regular house primary, which took place before the special election.)	Georgia House of Representatives	1982	
Illinois 2		Donna Miller (D)	No; Open seat; replacing Robin Kelly (D)	Cook County Board of Commissioners	1965	
Illinois 4		Patty García (D)	No; Open seat; replacing Chuy García (D)	Chief of Staff for Chuy García	1984/1985	
Illinois 7		La Shawn Ford (D)	No; Open seat; replacing Danny Davis (D)	Illinois House of Representatives	1972	
Illinois 8		Melissa Bean (D)	No; Open seat; replacing Raja Krishnamoorthi (D)	U.S. House of Representatives (Note: Previously elected to the 109th, 110th and 111th Congress, serving from 2005 to 2011.); Sales executive	1962	
Illinois 9		Daniel Biss (D)	No; Open seat; replacing Jan Schakowsky (D)	Mayor of Evanston; Illinois Senate; Illinois House of Representatives	1977	
Indiana 5		J. D. Ford (D)	Yes; Defeated Victoria Spartz (R)	Indiana Senate	1982	
Iowa 1		Christina Bohannan (D)	Yes; Defeated Mariannette Miller-Meeks (R)	Iowa House of Representatives	1971	
Iowa 2		Lindsay James (D)	Yes; Open seat; replacing Ashley Hinson (R)	Iowa House of Representatives	1980	
Iowa 3		Sarah Trone Garriott (D)	Yes; Defeated Zach Nunn (R)	Iowa Senate	1978	
Iowa 4		Chris McGowan (R)	No; Open seat; replacing Randy Feenstra (R)	Siouxland Chamber of Commerce	1966	
Kentucky 4		Ed Gallrein (R)	No; Defeated Thomas Massie (R) in a primary	Dairy farmer United States Navy SEALs	1958	
Kentucky 6		Zach Dembo (D)	Yes; Open seat; replacing Andy Barr (R)	U.S. District Court for the Eastern District of Kentucky; U.S. Navy Judge Advocate General's Corps	1985	
Louisiana 5		TBD	TBD; Open seat; replacing Julia Letlow (R)			
Louisiana 6		TBD	TBD; Open seat; replacing Cleo Fields (D)			
Maine 2		Paul LePage (R)	Yes; Open seat; replacing Jared Golden (D)	Governor of Maine; Mayor of Waterville	1948	
Maryland 5		Adrian Boafo (D)	No; Open seat; replacing Steny Hoyer (D)	Maryland House of Delegates; Bowie City Council	1994	
Massachusetts 6		Dan Koh (D)	No; Open seat; replacing Seth Moulton (D)	Deputy Director of the White House Office of Intergovernmental Affairs	1985	
Michigan 4		Sean McCann (D)	Yes; Defeated Bill Huizenga (R)	Michigan Senate; Michigan House of Representatives	1971	
Michigan 7		William Lawrence (D)	Yes; Defeated Tom Barrett (R)	Activist; Co-founder of Sunrise Movement	1990	
Michigan 10		Christina Hines (D)	Yes; Open seat; replacing John James (R)	Prosecutor	1989	
Michigan 11		Jeremy Moss (D)	No; Open seat; replacing Haley Stevens (D)	Michigan Senate; Michigan House of Representatives	1986	
Michigan 13		Donavan McKinney (D)	No; Defeated Shri Thanedar (D) in a primary	Michigan House of Representatives	1992	
Minnesota 1		Jake Johnson (DFL)	Yes; Defeated Brad Finstad (R)	High school teacher	1983/1984	
Minnesota 2		Matt Little (DFL)	No; Open seat; replacing Angie Craig (DFL)	Minnesota Senate; Lawyer	1984	
Missouri 2		Fred Wellman (D)	Yes; Defeated Ann Wagner (R)	Podcast host United States Army	1965	
Missouri 6		Chris Stigall (R)	No; Open seat; replacing Sam Graves (R)	Radio talk show host	1977	
Montana 1		Sam Forstag (D)	Yes; Open seat; replacing Ryan Zinke (R)	Labor union leader and smokejumper	1994	
Nebraska 2		Denise Powell (D)	Yes; Open seat; replacing Don Bacon (R)	Political organizer	1978	
Nevada 2		Teresa Benitez-Thompson (D)	Yes; Open seat; replacing Mark Amodei (R)	Majority Leader of the Nevada State Assembly	1978	
New Hampshire 1		Stefany Shaheen (D)	No; Open seat; replacing Chris Pappas (D)	Portsmouth City Council	1974	
New Jersey 2		Zack Mullock (D)	Yes; Defeated Jeff Van Drew (R)	Mayor of Cape May	1985	
New Jersey 7		Rebecca Bennett (D)	Yes; Defeated Thomas Kean Jr. (R)	Healthcare executive United States Navy	1987	
New Jersey 12		Adam Hamawy (D)	No; Open seat; replacing Bonnie Watson Coleman (D)	United States Army Medical Corps	1969/1970	
New York 7		Claire Valdez (D)	No; Open seat; replacing Nydia Velázquez (D)	New York State Assembly	1989	
New York 10		Brad Lander (D)	No; Defeated Dan Goldman (D) in a primary	New York City Comptroller; New York City Council	1969	
New York 12		Micah Lasher (D)	No; Open seat; replacing Jerry Nadler (D)	New York State Assembly	1981	
New York 13		Darializa Avila Chevalier (D)	No; Defeated Adriano Espaillat (D) in a primary	Community organizer	1993/1994	
New York 17		Cait Conley (D)	Yes; Defeated Mike Lawler (R)	Cybersecurity and Infrastructure Security Agency Officer	1985/1986	
New York 21		Anthony Constantino (R)	No; Open seat; replacing Elise Stefanik (R)	CEO of Sticker Mule	1982	
North Carolina 3		Raymond Smith Jr. (D)	Yes; Defeated Greg Murphy (R)	North Carolina House of Representatives	1961	
North Carolina 5		Chuck Hubbard (D)	Yes; Defeated Virginia Foxx (R)	Newspaper reporter	1961/1962	
North Carolina 6		Cyril Jefferson (D)	Yes; Defeated Addison McDowell (R)	Mayor of High Point	1991/1992	
North Carolina 9		Richard Ojeda (D)	Yes; Defeated Richard Hudson (R)	West Virginia Senate; United States Army major	1970	
North Carolina 11		Jamie Ager (D)	Yes; Replacing Chuck Edwards (R), who withdrew after the primary	Farmer and businessman	1977	
North Carolina 13		Paul Barringer (D)	Yes; Defeated Brad Knott (R)	Attorney	1966/1967	
North Carolina 14		LaKesha Womack (D)	Yes; Defeated Tim Moore (R)	Business consultant and minister	1976/1977	
Ohio 7		Brian Poindexter (D)	Yes; Defeated Max Miller (R)	Brook Park City Council; Union organizer and ironworker	1979	
Ohio 10		Kristina Knickerbocker (D)	Yes; Defeated Mike Turner (R)	United States Air Force	1991	
Ohio 15		Don Leonard (D)	Yes; Defeated Mike Carey (R)	Professor	1977	
Oklahoma 1		Mark Tedford (R)	No; Open seat; replacing Kevin Hern (R)	Oklahoma House of Representatives	1969	
Pennsylvania 1		Bob Harvie (D)	Yes; Defeated Brian Fitzpatrick (R)	Bucks County Board of Commissioners; Educator	1970/1971	
Pennsylvania 3		Chris Rabb (D)	No; Open seat; replacing Dwight Evans (D)	Pennsylvania House of Representatives	1970	
Pennsylvania 7		Bob Brooks (D)	Yes; Defeated Ryan Mackenzie (R)	Labor leader and firefighter	1972/1973	
Pennsylvania 8		Paige Cognetti (D)	Yes; Defeated Rob Bresnahan (R)	Mayor of Scranton	1980	
Pennsylvania 10		Janelle Stelson (D)	Yes; Defeated Scott Perry (R)	News anchor at WGAL-TV	1960	
South Carolina 1		Nancy Lacore (D)	Yes; Open seat; replacing Nancy Mace (R)	Chief of Navy Reserve; United States Navy	1968/1969	
South Carolina 5		Wes Climer (R)	No; Open seat; replacing Ralph Norman (R)	South Carolina Senate	1982	
South Dakota at-large		Marty Jackley (R)	No; Open seat; replacing Dusty Johnson (R)	Attorney General of South Dakota; U.S. Attorney for the District of South Dakota	1970	
Tennessee 4		Victoria Broderick (D)	Yes; Defeated Scott DesJarlais (R)	Tennessee Democratic Party Executive Committee; County chair of Lincoln County	1991/1992	
Tennessee 5		Charlie Hatcher (R)	No; Defeated Andy Ogles (R) in a primary	Agriculture commissioner of Tennessee; Farmer	1958	
Tennessee 6		Johnny Garrett (R)	No; Open seat; replacing John Rose (R)	Tennessee House of Representatives	1978	
Tennessee 9		Brent Taylor (R)	Yes; Open seat; replacing Steve Cohen (D)	Tennessee Senate; Memphis City Council	1968	
Texas 2		Steve Toth (R)	No; Defeated Dan Crenshaw (R) in a primary	Texas House of Representatives	1960	
Texas 8		Jessica Steinmann (R)	No; Open seat; replacing Morgan Luttrell (R)	General counsel for the America First Policy Institute; U.S. Department of Justice Office of Victims of Crime	1984	
Texas 9		Leticia Gutierrez (D)	No; Open seat; replacing Al Green (D), who was redistricted	Community outreach organizer for Air Alliance Houston	1972/1973	
Texas 10		Chris Gober (R)	No; Open seat; replacing Michael McCaul (R)	Lawyer for America PAC; National Republican Senatorial Committee; Republican National Committee; Office of Legal Policy at the U.S. Department of Justice	1979	
Texas 15		Bobby Pulido (D)	Yes; Defeated Monica De La Cruz (R)	Tejano musician and actor	1973	
Texas 19		Tom Sell (R)	No; Open seat; replacing Jodey Arrington (R)	Businessman and attorney Deputy staff director to the U.S. States House Committee on Agriculture	1973	
Texas 21		Mark Teixeira (R)	No; Open seat; replacing Chip Roy (R)	Major League Baseball first baseman	1980	
Texas 22		Trever Nehls (R)	No; Open seat; replacing Troy Nehls (R)	Fort Bend County constable United States Army Reserve	1968	
Texas 23		Katy Padilla Stout (D)	Yes; Open seat; replacing Tony Gonzales (R)	Educator and attorney	1985	
Texas 30		Frederick Haynes III (D)	No; Open seat; replacing Jasmine Crockett (D), who was redistricted	Pastor; Former president and CEO of Rainbow/PUSH	1960	
Texas 32		Jace Yarbrough (R)	Yes; Open seat; replacing Julie Johnson (D), who was redistricted	Attorney; United States Air Force	1986/1987	
Texas 33		Colin Allred (D)	No; Open seat; replacing Marc Veasey (D)	U.S. House of Representatives (Note: Previously elected to the 116th, 117th, and 118th Congress, serving from 2019 to 2025.); Civil rights lawyer Professional football player	1983	
Texas 35		Johnny Garcia (D)	No; Open seat; replacing Greg Casar (D), who was redistricted	Bexar County Sheriff's Department	1987/1988	
Texas 38		Jon Bonck (R)	No; Open seat; replacing Wesley Hunt (R)	Mortgage broker and deacon	1987	
Utah 1		Ben McAdams (D)	Yes; Open seat; replacing Blake Moore (R), who was redistricted	U.S. House of Representatives (Note: Previously elected to the 116th Congress, serving from 2019 to 2021.); Mayor of Salt Lake County; Utah State Senate	1974	
Virginia 1		Shannon Taylor (D)	Yes; Defeated Rob Wittman (R)	Commonwealth's Attorney for Henrico County	1967	
Virginia 2		Elaine Luria (D)	Yes; Defeated Jen Kiggans (R)	U.S. House of Representatives (Note: Previously elected to the 116th and 117th Congress, serving from 2019 to 2023.); United States Navy	1975	
Washington 4		Amanda McKinney (R)	No; Open seat; replacing Dan Newhouse (R)	Yakima County commissioner	1978	
Wisconsin 1		Mitchell Berman (D)	Yes; Defeated Bryan Steil (R)	Registered nurse for the U.S. Department of Veterans Affairs	1986	
Wisconsin 3		Rebecca Cooke (D)	Yes; Defeated Derrick Van Orden (R)	Nonprofit founder and political consultant	1987	
Wisconsin 7		Michael Alfonso (R)	No; Open seat; replacing Tom Tiffany (R)	Accountant	2000	
Wyoming at-large		Chuck Gray (R)	No; Open seat; replacing Harriet Hageman (R)	Secretary of State of Wyoming	1990	

==== Non-voting delegates ====
District	Image	Delegate	Switched party	Prior background	Birth year	Ref
District of Columbia at-large		Robert White (D)	No; Open seat; replacing Eleanor Holmes Norton (D)	Council of the District of Columbia; Lawyer	1982	
Guam at-large		Alicia Limtiaco (D)	Yes; Defeated James Moylan (R)	U.S. Attorney for Guam and the Northern Mariana Islands; Attorney General of Guam	1963	
U.S. Virgin Islands at-large		Janelle Sarauw (D)	No; Open seat; replacing Stacey Plaskett (D)	Legislature of the Virgin Islands; Educator	1985	

== Notes ==
Preceded by New members of the 119th Congress	New members of the 120th Congress; Starting January 3, 2027	Most recent
