= David Dawson (politician) =

American politician and lawyer

Dave Dawson
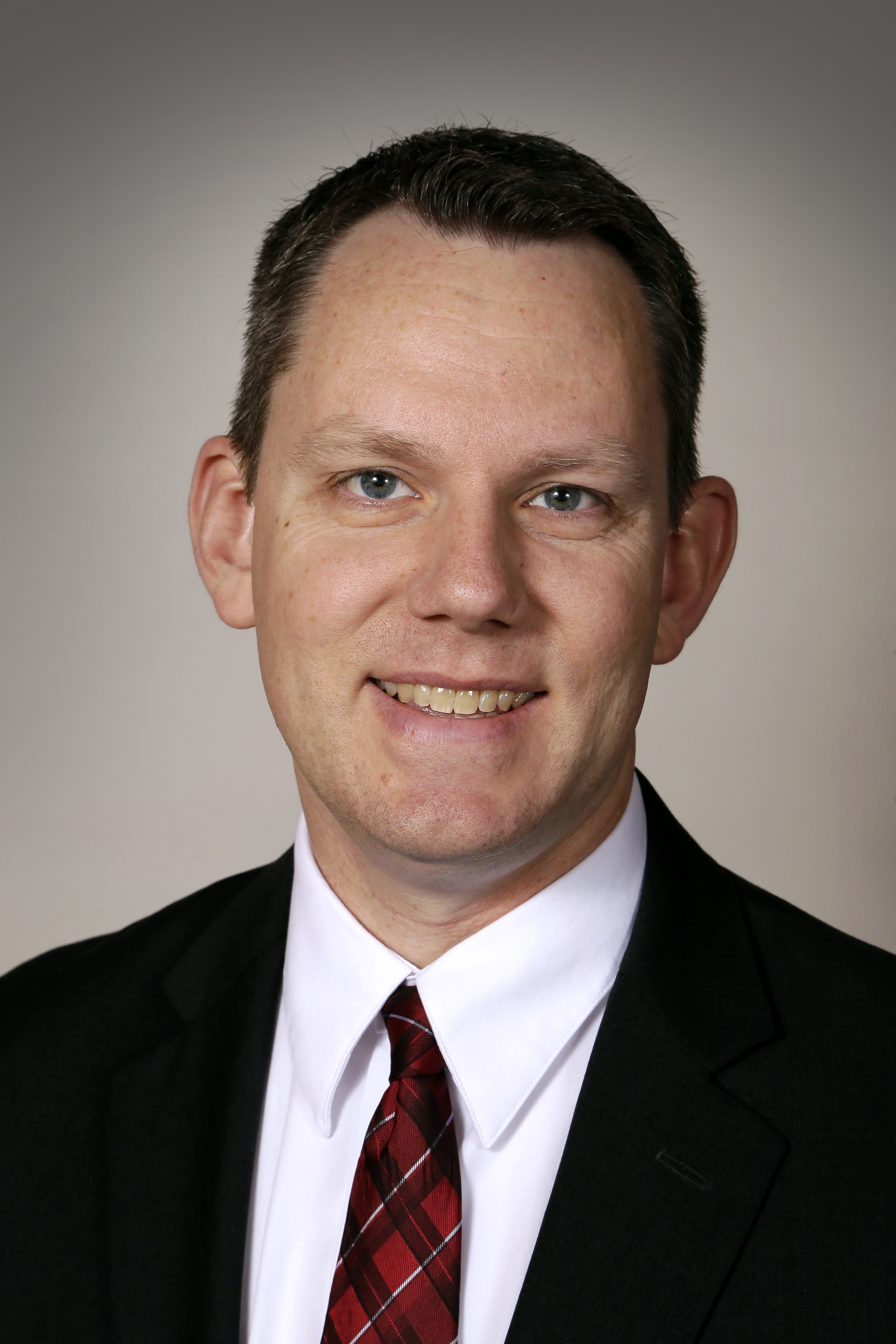

Member of the Iowa House of Representatives from the 14th district
- In office January 14, 2013 – January 8, 2017
- Preceded by: Josh Byrnes
- Succeeded by: Timothy Kacena

Personal details
- Born: David Alan Dawson; October 5, 1973 (age 53) Cherokee, Iowa, U.S.
- Party: Democratic
- Spouse: Liza
- Children: 3
- Education: Iowa State University (BS); University of California, Los Angeles (JD)
- Website: State House website Campaign website

David Alan Dawson (born October 5, 1973) is an American politician and prosecutor. A member of the Democratic Party, he served in the Iowa House of Representatives from 2013 to 2017, representing the 14th district in Sioux City. He serves as a prosecutor in the Woodbury County Attorney's Office and was the Democratic nominee for Iowa's 4th congressional district in the 2026 election, losing to Republican Chris McGowan.

== Early life and education ==
Dawson was born in Cherokee, Iowa, and raised in Washta. He graduated as valedictorian from Willow Community High School in Quimby in 1992. He earned bachelor's degrees in sociology and psychology from Iowa State University in 1996 and received a Juris Doctor from the University of California, Los Angeles, in 1999.

== Legal career ==
After graduating from law school, Dawson worked as an attorney with the law firm Winston & Strawn in Chicago, where he handled commercial litigation for three years. In 2002, he returned to Iowa and joined the Woodbury County Attorney's Office as a prosecutor handling child abuse and juvenile cases.

In 2010, Dawson opened a private law practice in Sioux City focused on children and families, where he practiced for five years. He returned to the Woodbury County Attorney's Office as a prosecutor in 2015. During his tenure as a prosecutor, he successfully argued a case before the Iowa Supreme Court involving children's rights.

Outside his legal career, Dawson has served on the board of Community Action Agency of Siouxland and is vice president of the board of New Perspectives, Inc. He is a former president of Siouxland CARES and served as president of the Siouxland Council on Child Abuse and Neglect.

== Iowa House of Representatives ==
Dawson was elected to the Iowa House of Representatives to represent the 14th district in 2012 and reelected in 2014, serving from 2013 to 2017.

During his tenure, Dawson worked on bipartisan legislation that reduced commercial property taxes with state funding to offset revenue losses for local governments, expanded Medicaid access, established a mental health crisis stabilization unit in Sioux City, and modified criminal sentencing laws. He also supported mandatory minimum sentences for caretakers whose actions resulted in a person's death. In 2016, he received the Gold Star Award from the Iowa State Sheriffs' and Deputies' Association for his work on public safety and law enforcement issues.

During his first term, Dawson served on the Commerce, Human Resources, Judiciary, and Public Safety committees and the Justice System Appropriations Subcommittee. During his second term, he served on the Commerce, Ethics, Human Resources, Judiciary, and Transportation committees and the Transportation, Infrastructure, and Capitals Appropriations Subcommittee.

== 2026 U.S. House of Representatives campaign ==
On August 27, 2025, Dawson announced his campaign for the United States House of Representatives in Iowa's 4th congressional district. He won the Democratic primary in June 2026 with 39% of the vote, defeating Stephanie Steiner and Ashley WolfTornabane. He advanced to the general election against Republican nominee Chris McGowan after incumbent Representative Randy Feenstra chose to run for governor rather than seek reelection.

== Personal life ==
Dawson is married to his wife Liza. They have three children and live in Lawton, Iowa. He is a member of the Lutheran Church.

== Electoral history ==
Election	Political result	Candidate	Party	Votes	%
Iowa House of Representatives primary elections, 2010; District 1	Democratic	David Dawson	Democratic	unopposed	
Iowa House of Representatives general elections, 2010; District 1 Turnout: 8,841	Republican gain from Democratic	Jeremy Taylor	Republican	4,645	52.54%
Iowa House of Representatives general elections, 2010; District 1 Turnout: 8,841	Republican gain from Democratic	David Dawson	Democratic	4,013	45.39%
Iowa House of Representatives primary elections, 2012; District 14	Democratic	David Dawson	Democratic	unopposed	
Iowa House of Representatives general elections, 2012; District 14; Turnout: 11,111	Democratic (newly redistricted)	David Dawson	Democratic	6,617	59.55%
Iowa House of Representatives general elections, 2012; District 14; Turnout: 11,111	Democratic (newly redistricted)	Greg Grupp	Republican	4,494	40.45%
