= 2026 United States Senate election in Iowa =

- November 3, 2026
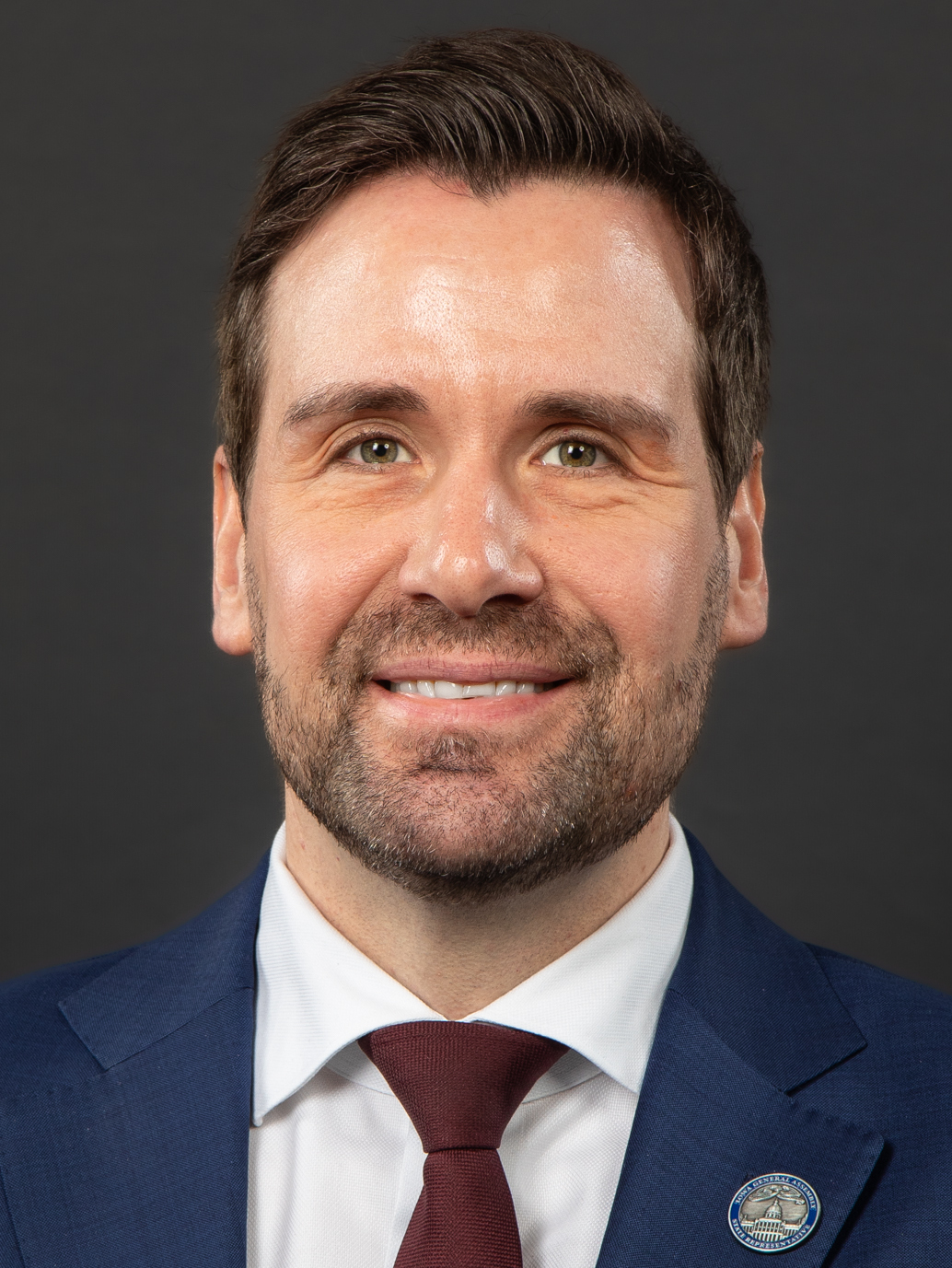

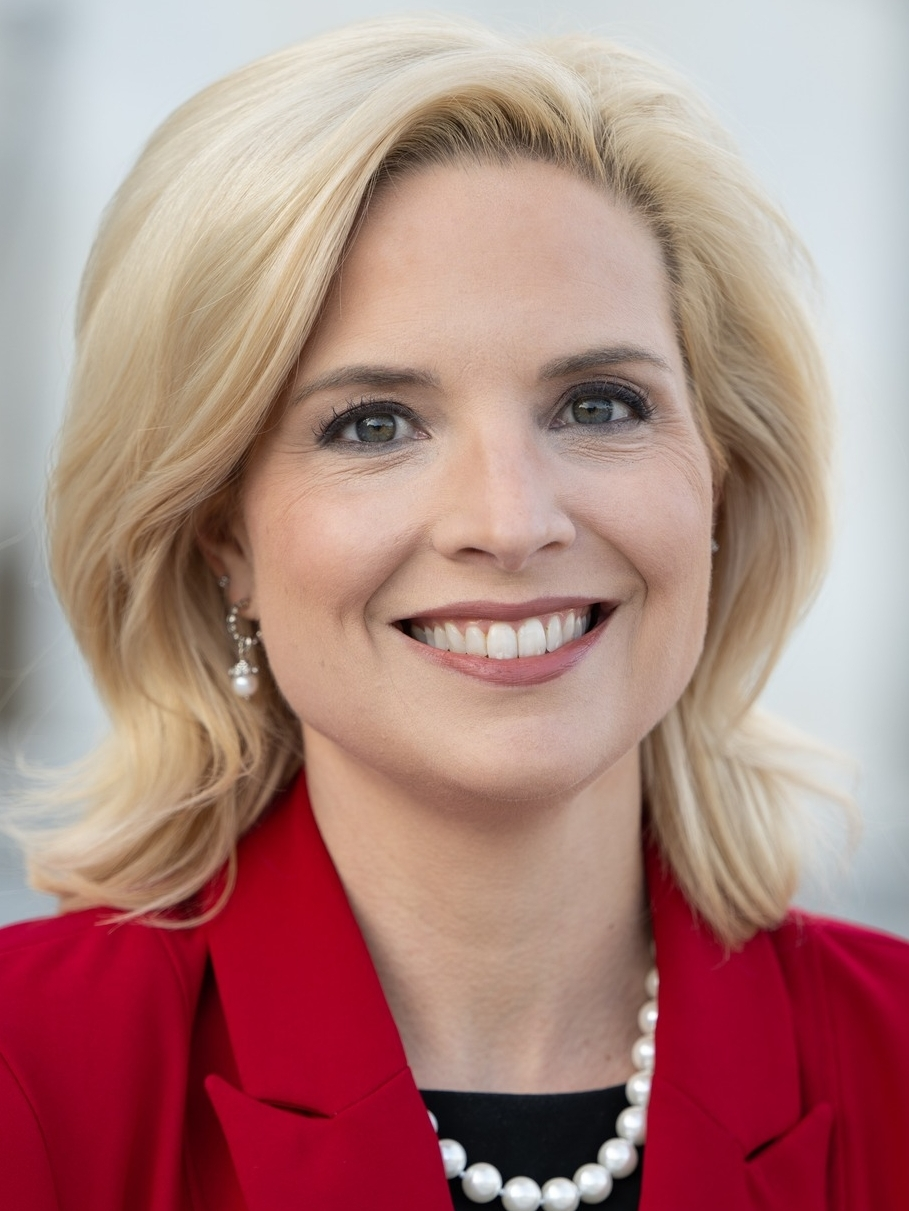
Nominee	Josh Turek	Ashley Hinson
Party	Democratic	Republican
Popular vote	688,746	631,482
Percentage	50.56%	46.35%
- Turek: 40–50% 50–60% 60–70% 70–80% Hinson: 40–50% 50–60% 60–70% 70–80%
U.S. senator before election
Joni Ernst
Republican
Elected U.S. Senator
Josh Turek
Democratic

The 2026 United States Senate election in Iowa was held on November 3, 2026, to elect a member of the United States Senate to represent the state of Iowa. Democratic state representative Josh Turek defeated Republican representative Ashley Hinson. Republican incumbent Joni Ernst did not seek a third term.

Primary elections were held on June 2. Endorsed by President Donald Trump, Hinson won the Republican nomination with 73.9% of the vote over former state senator Jim Carlin. Turek won the Democratic nomination with 62.6% of the vote over state senator Zach Wahls.

Turek is the first Democrat to win a Senate election in Iowa since 2008.

This was one of eight seats Democrats flipped in a state carried by Donald Trump in the 2024 presidential election.

== Background ==
Since voting for President Barack Obama in both 2008 and 2012, Iowa had trended increasingly Republican and was considered a moderately to strongly red state at the federal and state level. Republican nominee Donald Trump won Iowa in 2020 by 8 percentage points, and in 2024 grew his margin to 13 percentage points. Republicans controlled every statewide executive office (except the state auditor's office), majorities in both chambers of the state legislature, and the entire congressional delegation. Incumbent Senator Joni Ernst was first elected as part of the 2014 red wave and was reelected in 2020.

In the latter half of her second term, Ernst came under increasing pressure. In December 2024, she faced pushback from Republicans for her skepticism of Pete Hegseth's nomination for Secretary of Defense. She later sparked controversy for replying "we are all going to die" when a constituent confronted her for deaths that could be caused by cuts to Medicaid and SNAP, which she supported as part of the One Big Beautiful Bill Act.

In September 2025, Ernst announced that she would not seek reelection, officially citing family obligations, although her decision was interpreted in light of previous controversies. The resulting open seat was expected to make the race more competitive.

== Republican primary ==
=== Candidates ===
==== Nominee ====
- Ashley Hinson, U.S. representative from Iowa's 2nd congressional district (2021–2027)

==== Eliminated in primary ====
- Jim Carlin, former state senator from the 3rd district (2017–2023) and candidate for U.S. Senate in 2022

==== Withdrawn ====
- Joshua Smith, former vice chair of the Libertarian National Committee (2022–2023) and Libertarian candidate for president in 2024

==== Declined ====
- Brenna Bird, Iowa attorney general (2023–2027) (ran for re-election; endorsed Hinson)
- Joni Ernst, incumbent U.S. senator (2015–2027) (endorsed Hinson)
- Kari Lake, senior advisor to the U.S. Agency for Global Media (2025–present), nominee for Governor of Arizona in 2022, and nominee for U.S. Senate in Arizona in 2024
- Zach Nunn, U.S. representative from Iowa's 3rd congressional district (2023–2027) (ran for re-election; endorsed Hinson)

=== Endorsements ===
Jim Carlin

Executive branch officials

- Michael Flynn, former national security advisor (2017)

State legislators

- Kevin Alons, SD-07 (2023–present)
- Doug Campbell, SD-30 (2025–present)
- Mark Cisneros, HD-91 (2021–present)
- Samantha Fett, HD-22 (2025–present)
- Sandy Salmon, SD-29 (2023–present)
Ashley Hinson

Executive branch officials

- Terry Branstad, former ambassador to China (2017–2020) and former governor of Iowa (1983–1999, 2011–2017)
- Markwayne Mullin, secretary of homeland security (2026–present)
- Donald Trump, president of the United States (2017–2021, 2025–present)

U.S. senators

- Jim Banks, Indiana (2025–present)
- Katie Britt, Alabama (2023–present)
- Shelley Moore Capito, West Virginia (2015–present)
- Tom Cotton, Arkansas (2015–present)
- Joni Ernst, Iowa (2015–present)
- Chuck Grassley, president pro tempore (2019–2021, 2025–present) from Iowa (1981–present)
- Dave McCormick, Pennsylvania (2025–present)
- Jerry Moran, Kansas (2011–present)
- Tim Scott, South Carolina (2013–present)
- John Thune, Senate majority leader (2025–present) from South Dakota (2005–present)

U.S. representatives

- Tom Emmer, House majority whip (2023–present) from MN-6 (2015–present)
- Mariannette Miller-Meeks, IA-1 (2021–present)
- Zach Nunn, IA-3 (2023–present)
- Steve Scalise, House majority leader (2023–present) from LA-1 (2008–present)
- Elise Stefanik, NY-21 (2015–present)

Statewide officials

- Brenna Bird, attorney general of Iowa (2023–present)
- Mike Naig, Iowa secretary of agriculture (2018–present)
- Paul Pate, Iowa secretary of state (1995–1999, 2015–present)
- Kim Reynolds, governor of Iowa (2017–present)

State legislators

- Bobby Kaufmann, majority leader of the Iowa House of Representatives (2025–present) from HD-82 (2013–present)

Organizations

- AIPAC
- American Conservation Coalition
- Americans for Prosperity
- ClearPath Foundation
- Log Cabin Republicans
- Maggie's List
- Susan B. Anthony Pro-Life America

=== Fundraising ===
Italics indicate a declined candidate.

Campaign finance reports as of April 18, 2026
Candidate	Raised	Spent	Cash on hand
Jim Carlin (R)	$293,966	$279,387	$14,578
Ashley Hinson (R)	$7,267,266	$2,679,198	$6,516,143
Joni Ernst (R)	$6,954,692	$5,485,942	$1,997,164
Source: Federal Election Commission

=== Polling ===
Poll source	Date(s) administered	Sample size (Note: Key: A – all adults RV – registered voters LV – likely voters V – unclear)	Margin of error	Ashley Hinson	Jim Carlin	Undecided
JMC Analytics (R)	May 27–28, 2026	550 (A)	± 4.2%	58%	19%	23%

Hypothetical polling

Joni Ernst vs. "Someone Else"

Poll source	Date(s) administered	Sample size	Margin of error	Joni Ernst	Someone Else	Undecided
Victory Insights (R)	December 6–7, 2024	600 (LV)	–	48%	27%	26%

=== Results ===
Primary results by county: Hinson: 50–60%; 60–70%; 70–80%; 80–90%

Republican primary results
Party	Candidate	Votes	%
Republican	Ashley Hinson	153,059	74.2
Republican	Jim Carlin	53,196	25.8
Total votes		206,255	100.0

== Democratic primary ==
=== Candidates ===
==== Nominee ====
- Josh Turek, state representative from the 20th district (2023–present)

==== Eliminated in primary ====
- Zach Wahls, state senator from the 43rd district (2019–present) and former Senate Minority Leader (2020–2023)

==== Did not file ====
- Bob Krause, former state representative from the 7th district (1973–1978) and perennial candidate
- Richard Sherzan, former state representative from the 63rd district (1979–1981) and candidate for U.S. Senate in Arizona in 2016 and 2018

==== Withdrawn ====
- Jackie Norris, chair of the Des Moines school board and former Chief of Staff to the First Lady of the United States (2009–2011)
- Nathan Sage, market director for KNIA (endorsed Turek)
- J. D. Scholten, state representative from the 1st district (2023–present) and nominee for Iowa's 4th congressional district in 2018 and 2020 (endorsed Turek)

=== Endorsements ===
Josh Turek

Executive branch officials

- Pete Buttigieg, former secretary of transportation (2021–2025)

U.S. senators

- Bob Casey Jr., former Pennsylvania (2007–2025)
- Catherine Cortez Masto, Nevada (2017–present)
- Tammy Duckworth, Illinois (2017–present)
- Ruben Gallego, Arizona (2025–present)
- Tom Harkin, former Iowa (1985–2015)
- Maggie Hassan, New Hampshire (2017–present)

U.S. representatives

- Tony Coelho, former House majority whip (1987–1989) from CA-15 (1979–1989)
- Ro Khanna, CA-17 (2017–present)

Statewide officials

- Tom Miller, former attorney general of Iowa (1979–1991, 1995–2023)
- Sally Pederson, former lieutenant governor of Iowa (1999–2007) (previously endorsed Norris)

State legislators

- Robert Dvorsky, former SD-37 (1995–2019)
- Michael Gronstal, former Senate majority leader (2006–2017) from SD-08 (1985–2017)
- Pam Jochum, former Senate president (2013–2017) from SD-36 (2009–2025)
- Jennifer Konfrst, former House minority leader (2021–2025) from HD-32 (2019–present)
- J. D. Scholten, HD-01 (2023–present) and former candidate for this seat
- 2 state senators (Note: Molly Donahue, SD-37 (2023–present); Art Staed, SD-40 (2025–present))
- 11 other state representatives (Note: Jerome Amos Jr., HD-62 (2023–present); Austin Baeth, HD-36 (2023–present); Sean Bagniewski, HD-35 (2023–present); Timi Brown-Powers, HD-61 (2015–present); Ruth Ann Gaines, HD-33 (2011–present); Monica Kurth, HD-98 (2023–present); Mary Madison, HD-31 (2023–present); Larry McBurney, HD-44 (2025–present); Amy Nielsen, HD-85 (2017–present); Elizabeth Wilson, HD-73 (2023–present); Adam Zabner, HD-90 (2023–present))
- 8 former state representatives (Note: Sue Cahill, former HD-52 (2021–2025); John Forbes, former HD-44 (2013–2025); Charles Isenhart, former HD-72 (2009–2025); Charlie McConkey, former HD-15 (2015–2023); Kirsten Running-Marquardt, Linn County supervisor (2023–present) and former HD-69 (2009–2023); Sami Scheetz, Linn County supervisor (2025–present) and former HD-78 (2023–2025); Mark Smith, former HD-71 (2001–2021) and former chair of the Iowa Democratic Party (2020–2021); Sharon Steckman, former HD-59 (2009–2025))

Party officials

- Andy McGuire, former chair of the Iowa Democratic Party (2015–2017)

Individuals

- Nathan Sage, market director for KNIA and former candidate for this seat

Organizations

- Defend The Vote
- VoteVets

Labor unions

- Heat and Frost Insulators Local 39
- United Food and Commercial Workers Local 222IN
Zach Wahls

U.S. senators

- Elizabeth Warren, Massachusetts (2013–present)

U.S. representatives

- Dave Loebsack, former IA-2 (2007–2021)

Statewide officials

- Howard Dean, former governor of Vermont (1991–2003) and chair of the DNC (2005–2009)
- Patty Judge, former lieutenant governor of Iowa (2007–2011)
- Jason Kander, former secretary of state of Missouri (2013–2017)

State legislators

- 3 current state senators (Note: Liz Bennett, SD-39 (2023–present); Matt Blake, SD-22 (2025–present); Izaah Knox, SD-17 (2023–present))
- 4 former state senators (Note: Rob Hogg, former SD-33 (2007–2023); Jean Hall Lloyd-Jones, former SD-23 (1987–1995); Jim Lykam, former SD-45 (2017–2023); Liz Mathis, former SD-34 (2011–2023))
- 3 current state representatives (Note: Ken Croken, HD-97 (2023–present); Daniel Gosa, HD-81 (2025–present); David Jacoby, HD-86 (2003–present))
- 3 former state representatives (Note: Elesha Gayman, former HD-84 (2007–2001); Jerry Kearns, former HD-92 (2009–2019); Richard Myers, former HD-30 (1994–2003))

Individuals

- Tim Dwight, former NFL and University of Iowa football player
- Fred Hubbell, nominee for governor of Iowa in 2018

Labor unions

- Central Iowa Building & Construction Trades Council
- Cedar Rapids/Iowa City Building & Construction Trades Council
- Communications Workers of America Local 7110
- Ironworkers Locals 67, 89 & 111
- International Association of Fire Fighters Local 610
- International Union of Elevator Constructors Local 28
- Teamsters Local 90
- United Food and Commercial Workers Local 1846
- Heat and Frost Insulators Local 81
- UA Plumbers & Pipefitters Local 125

Organizations

- Joint Action Committee for Political Affairs
Jackie Norris (withdrawn)

Statewide officials

- Sally Pederson, former lieutenant governor of Iowa (1999–2007) (later endorsed Turek)

State legislators

- Tony Bisignano, SD-15 (2015–present)
- Claire Celsi, former SD-16 (2019–2025) (deceased)

Local officials

- Connie Boesen, mayor of Des Moines (2024–present)

=== Fundraising ===
Italics indicate withdrawn candidate

Campaign finance reports as of April 18, 2026
Candidate	Raised	Spent	Cash on hand
Nathan Sage (D)	$1,432,562	$1,432,459	$102
Josh Turek (D)	$2,808,701	$2,051,221	$757,480
Zach Wahls (D)	$3,167,670	$2,112,265	$1,055,405
Jackie Norris (D)	$363,563	$363,563	$0
J. D. Scholten (D)	$213,415	$205,271	$8,144
Source: Federal Election Commission

=== Polling ===
Poll source	Date(s) administered	Sample size	Margin of error	Josh Turek	Zach Wahls	Other	Undecided
Public Policy Polling (D) (Note: Poll commissioned by VoteVets, which supports Turek)	May 20–21, 2026	672 (LV)	± 3.8%	52%	31%	–	17%
Public Policy Polling (D) (Note: Poll sponsored by Turek's campaign)	May 5–6, 2026	764 (LV)	± 3.6%	53%	27%	–	20%
Public Policy Polling (D)	April 23, 2026	– (LV)	–	41%	23%	–	36%
FM3 Research (D)	April 21–23, 2026	600 (LV)	± 4.0%	48%	28%	–	24%
Bedrock Polling (Note: Poll sponsored by Teamsters Local 238)	March 26, 2026	1,022 (LV)	± 3.2%	38%	56%	–	6%
FM3 Research (D)	March 11–14, 2026	600 (LV)	± 4.0%	25%	34%	–	41%
GQR (D) (Note: Poll sponsored by Wahls's campaign)	February 18–22, 2026	605 (LV)	–	24%	42%	–	34%
NRSC (R)	February 16–18, 2026	1,923 (LV)	± 2.5%	23%	30%	5% (Note: "Someone else" with 5%)	42%

=== Results ===
Primary results by county: Turek: 50–60%; 60–70%; 70–80%; 80–90%; Wahls: 50–60%

Democratic primary results
Party	Candidate	Votes	%
Democratic	Josh Turek	120,287	62.7
Democratic	Zach Wahls	71,663	37.3
Total votes		191,950	100.0

== Libertarian primary ==
On June 2, the Laehn campaign submitted nearly 10,000 signatures to the Iowa Secretary of State, satisfying the 3,500 signature requirement to qualify for the ballot. Laehn was added to the candidate list as the Libertarian Party's candidate.

=== Candidates ===
==== Nominee ====
- Thomas Laehn, Greene County District Attorney

=== Fundraising ===
Campaign finance reports as of April 18, 2026
Candidate	Raised	Spent	Cash on hand
Thomas Laehn (L)	$42,944	$37,430	$5,513
Source: Federal Election Commission

== General election ==
According to The Daily Iowan, the cost of living, inflation, tariffs, health-care affordability, agriculture, and AI data centers are contested issues of the campaign. Debates focused on which candidate was most capable to handle the American affordability crisis. Turek has said he would reverse the Medicaid spending cuts passed under the One Big Beautiful Bill Act. Hinson supported the cuts as fiscally responsible as well as Trump's tariffs.

Hinson ran on socially conservative policies, opposing a legal right to have an abortion with exceptions for rape, incest, and the life of the mother and LGBTQ movements. Turek supports restoring the abortion protections that Roe v. Wade previously provided, by passing a federal law. He claimed that Iowa's six-week abortion ban reduced OB-GYN services available. Turek affirmed conservative policies on guns, transgender rights, and immigration.

Turek criticized the concentration of artificial intelligence technology in the hands of a few companies. He supports regulating data centers, opposes tax breaks for their operators, and "safeguards" for the technology. Hinson is in favor of AI development, and says that preparation for workers is necessary to adapt to AI job losses. She said an "AI economy" is necessary to win an American-Chinese AI arms race, "because the truth is: if we don't, China will."

=== Predictions ===
Source	Ranking	As of
ABC News	Tossup	November 3, 2026
CBS News	Lean R	October 30, 2026
The Cook Political Report	Tossup	November 2, 2026
Decision Desk HQ	Tossup	November 3, 2026
The Economist (Note: The Economist's prediction model uses unconventional terminology. For the purpose of equivalency, their "Very Likely" ratings are formatted as a "Likely" rating while "Likely" ratings are formatted as a "Lean" rating.)	Lean R	November 3, 2026
FiftyPlusOne	Tossup	November 3, 2026
Fox News	Tossup	November 1, 2026
Inside Elections	Tossup	October 29, 2026
MS NOW	Lean R	October 29, 2026
NBC News	Tossup	November 3, 2026
RealClearPolitics	Tossup	November 2, 2026
Sabato's Crystal Ball	Lean R	November 2, 2026
Silver Bulletin	Tossup	November 3, 2026
Split Ticket	Tossup	November 2, 2026

=== Post-primary endorsements ===
Ashley Hinson (R)

Executive branch officials

- George W. Bush, former president of the United States (2001–2009)
- Lee Greenwood, former member of the National Council on the Arts (2008–2022)
- Elon Musk, former senior advisor to the president (2025) (Independent)
- JD Vance, vice president of the United States (2025–present)

U.S. senators

- John Barrasso, Senate majority whip (2025–present) from Wyoming (2007–present)
- John Cornyn, Texas (2002–2027)
- Ted Cruz, Texas (2013–present)
- John Kennedy, Louisiana (2017–present)
- Eric Schmitt, Missouri (2023–present)
- Rick Scott, Florida (2019–present)

U.S. representatives

- Mike Johnson, speaker of the House (2023–2027) from LA-4 (2017–present)

State legislators

- Eddie Andrews, HD-43 (2021–present)
- Mike Bousselot, SD-21 (2023–present)
- Jim Carlin, former SD-03 (2017–2023) and primary candidate for this seat (previously declined to endorse)
- Jeff Kaufmann, former HD-79 (2005–2013) and chair of the Iowa GOP (2014–present)
- Joe Mitchell, former HD-84 (2019–2023)
- Charley Thomson, HD-58 (2023–present)

Individuals

- Dan Gable, former freestyle wreslter
- Scott Jennings, political strategist
- Zach Lahn, businessman and nominee for governor of Iowa in 2026
- Chris McGowan, economic development executive
- Bruce Rastetter, businessman and entrepreneur

Labor unions

- National Border Patrol Council

Organizations

- America PAC
- Iowa Corn Growers Association PAC
- Iowa Farm Bureau
- National Federation of Independent Business
- NRA Political Victory Fund
- Senate Leadership Fund
- The Family Leader
- U.S. Chamber of Commerce

Political parties

- Iowa Republican Party
Josh Turek (D)

Executive branch officials

- Martin O'Malley, former commissioner of the Social Security Administration (2023–2024)
- Barack Obama, former president of the United States (2009–2017)

U.S. senators

- Kirsten Gillibrand, New York (2009–present)
- Mark Kelly, Arizona (2020–present)
- Andy Kim, New Jersey (2024–present)
- Elissa Slotkin, Michigan (2025–present)
- Chris Van Hollen, Maryland (2017–present)
- Sheldon Whitehouse, Rhode Island (2007–present)

U.S. representatives

- Jamie Raskin, MD-08 (2017–present)

State legislators

- Edgar Bittle, former HD-66 (1973–1977) (Republican)
- Andy McKean, former HD-23 (1979–1983), HD-44 (1983–1993), SD-28 (1993–2003) and HD-58 (2017–2021)
- Zach Wahls, former Senate minority leader (2020–2023) from SD-43 (2019–present) and primary candidate for this seat

Local officials

- Matt Walsh, former mayor of Council Bluffs (2014–2025) (Republican)

Individuals

- Jon Bauman, singer and game show host
- Matthew Yglesias, blogger and journalist

Labor unions

- American Federation of Government Employees
- Iowa Farmers Union
- Iowa Professional Fire Fighters Association
- National Education Association
- United Auto Workers

Organizations

- End Citizens United
- Feminist Majority PAC
- J Street
- Jewish Democratic Council of America
- League of Conservation Voters
- Peace Action
- Reproductive Freedom for All

Newspapers

- The Des Moines Register
- The Gazette

Political parties

- Iowa Democratic Party
Declined to endorse

State legislators

- ~~Jim Carlin, former SD-03 (2017–2023) and primary candidate for this seat~~ (Republican; later endorsed Hinson)

=== Fundraising ===
Campaign finance reports as of October 14, 2026
Candidate	Raised	Spent	Cash on hand
Ashley Hinson (R)	$14,147,973	$13,903,059	$2,172,989
Josh Turek (D)	$24,290,521	$21,217,670	$3,072,851
Thomas Laehn (L)	$83,667	$74,632	$9,035
Source: Federal Election Commission

=== Polling ===
Aggregate polls

Source of poll aggregation	Dates administered	Dates updated	Ashley Hinson (R)	Josh Turek (D)	Other/ Undecided (Note: Calculated by taking the difference of 100% and all other candidates combined.)	Margin
270toWin	October 16 – November 1, 2026	November 3, 2026	46.8%	47.7%	5.5%	Turek +0.9%
Decision Desk HQ	through November 1, 2026	November 3, 2026	47.3%	47.0%	5.7%	Hinson +0.3%
FiftyPlusOne	through November 1, 2026	November 3, 2026	47.2%	47.8%	5.0%	Turek +0.6%
RealClearPolitics	October 13 – November 1, 2026	November 2, 2026	47.1%	47.1%	5.8%	Tie
Silver Bulletin	through November 1, 2026	November 3, 2026	46.7%	47.7%	5.6%	Turek +1.0%
Average			47.0%	47.5%	5.5%	Turek +0.5%

Poll source	Date(s) administered	Sample size	Margin of error	Ashley Hinson (R)	Josh Turek (D)	Other	Undecided
AtlasIntel	October 28 – November 1, 2026	1,219 (LV)	± 3.0%	46%	51%	3% (Note: "Other" with 3%; "Would not vote" with <1%)	0%
New York Times/Siena University	October 26 – November 1, 2026	705 (LV)	± 4.7%	47%	48%	0%	5%
GrayHouse (R)	October 28–31, 2026	601 (LV)	± 4.0%	48%	46%	2% (Note: Thomas Laehn (L) with 2%)	4%
Rasmussen Reports (R)	October 27–31, 2026	901 (LV)	± 3.0%	47%	46%	3% (Note: Thomas Laehn (L) with 3%)	5%
YouGov	October 26–29, 2026	2,020 (LV)	± 3.1%	49%	50%	1%	0%
co/efficient (R)	October 28, 2026	1,020 (LV)	± 3.1%	48%	46%	1% (Note: Thomas Laehn (L) with 1%)	5%
Echelon Insights (R) (Note: Poll conducted for NetChoice)	October 16–23, 2026	403 (LV)	± 6.5%	43%	45%	7% (Note: Thomas Laehn (L) with 7%)	3%
InsiderAdvantage (R)	October 21–22, 2026	1,200 (LV)	± 2.8%	47%	45%	—	8%
co/efficient (R)	October 15–19, 2026	863 (LV)	± 3.3%	48%	45%	2%	6%
co/efficient (R)	October 15–19, 2026	863 (LV)	± 3.3%	49%	46%	—	5%
Trafalgar Group (R)	October 13–15, 2026	1,094 (LV)	± 2.9%	46%	44%	4% (Note: Thomas Laehn (L) with 4%)	6%
GS Strategy Group (R)/ New River Strategies (D) (Note: Poll sponsored by The Cook Political Report.)	October 9–13, 2026	602 (LV)	—	44%	46%	8% (Note: Thomas Laehn (L) with 8%)	2%
NPA Polling	October 8–12, 2026	678 (LV)	± 3.8%	47%	44%	4% (Note: Thomas Laehn (L) with 4%)	5%
NPA Polling	October 8–12, 2026	678 (LV)	± 3.8%	48% (Note: In a two-way race between Hinson and Turek)	47%	—	4%
YouGov	October 6–12, 2026	2,245 (LV)	± 3.1%	46%	47%	2%	4%
Marist University	October 8–11, 2026	—(LV)	± 6.6%	45%	48%	3% (Note: "Another party's candidate" with 2%; "No response" with 1%)	4%
Marist University	October 8–11, 2026	1,100 (RV)	± 4.5%	44%	51%	2% (Note: "Another party's candidate" with 2%)	3%
Emerson College (Note: Poll sponsored by Nexstar Media Group)	October 5–6, 2026	650 (LV)	± 3.8%	47%	45%	2%	7%
SSRS (Note: Poll conducted for CNN)	September 29 – October 5, 2026	801 (LV)	± 4.2%	45%	43%	11% (Note: "Neither" with 8%; "Other" with 3%)	—
Suffolk University	October 1–4, 2026	500 (LV)	± 4.4%	44%	48%	3% (Note: Thomas Laehn (L) with 2%; "Refused" with 1%)	6%
New York Times/Siena University	September 22 – October 1, 2026	606 (LV)	± 4.6%	48%	47%	—	5%
Rasmussen Reports (R)	September 28–30, 2026	1,048 (LV)	± 3.0%	43%	47%	3%	7%
Quantus Insights (R)	September 28–29, 2026	738 (LV)	± 3.8%	47%	46%	2%	5%
Quantus Insights (R)	September 28–29, 2026	738 (LV)	± 3.8%	49% (Note: Leaners pushed)	47%	–	4%
Quantus Insights (R)	September 28–29, 2026	738 (LV)	± 3.8%	51% (Note: Two-way)	49%	–	–
Beacon Research (D)/ Shaw & Co. Research (R) (Note: Poll conducted for Fox News)	September 24–28, 2026	1,008 (LV)	± 3.0%	47%	49%	—	4%
Beacon Research (D)/ Shaw & Co. Research (R)	September 24–28, 2026	1,204 (RV)	± 2.5%	46%	50%	—	4%
InsiderAdvantage (R)	September 22–23, 2026	1,200 (LV)	± 2.8%	46%	47%	3% (Note: Thomas Laehn (L) with 2%, "Another candidate" with 1%)	4%
Marist University	September 17–20, 2026	1,050 (RV)	± 4.4%	42%	50%	2%	5%
Trafalgar Group (R)	September 16–18, 2026	1,089 (LV)	± 2.9%	44%	42%	3% (Note: Thomas Laehn (L) with 3%)	10%
co/efficient (R)	September 14–16, 2026	831 (LV)	± 3.4%	46%	42%	2%	9%
co/efficient (R)	September 14–16, 2026	831 (LV)	± 3.4%	48%	43%	–	9%
Cygnal (R) (Note: Poll sponsored by the Iowans for Tax Relief Foundation)	September 9–11, 2026	500 (LV)	± 4.4%	43%	43%	4% (Note: Thomas Laehn (L) with 4%)	10%
Rasmussen Reports (R)	September 8–10, 2026	1,031 (LV)	± 3.0%	40%	45%	4% (Note: Thomas Laehn (L) with 4%)	11%
YouGov	September 3–8, 2026	2,169 (RV)	± 3.5%	43%	44%	3% (Note: "Someone else" with 1% "I will not vote in this race" with 2%)	11%
YouGov	September 3–8, 2026	2,041 (LV)	± 3.5%	43%	47%	1% (Note: "Someone else" with 1%)	8%
Emerson College	August 31 – September 1, 2026	750 (LV)	± 3.6%	50%	45%	1%	5%
Global Strategy Group (D)	August 27–31, 2026	800 (LV)	± 3.5%	42%	46%	6% (Note: Thomas Laehn (L) with 6%)	6%
Abacus Data	August 26–28, 2026	323 (LV)	—	45%	54%	1% (Note: "Another candidate" with 1%)	—
Abacus Data	August 26–28, 2026	500 (RV)	± 4.4%	46%	52%	2% (Note: "Another candidate" with 2%)	—
Suffolk University	August 20–23, 2026	500 (LV)	± 4.4%	45%	41%	4% (Note: Thomas Laehn (L) with 4%)	10%
Emerson College	August 2–4, 2026	712 (LV)	± 3.7%	48%	45%	—	6%
Beacon Research (D)/ Shaw & Co. Research (R)	June 23–27, 2026	1,003 (RV)	± 3.0%	46%	50%	—	4%
New York Times/Siena University	June 15–27, 2026	600 (LV)	± 4.7%	48%	46%	—	5%
Cygnal (R) (Note: Poll sponsored by Iowans for Tax Relief)	June 16–19, 2026	600 (LV)	± 4.0%	46%	44%	—	10%
Global Strategy Group (D)	June 8–11, 2026	1,000 (LV)	± 3.1%	45%	47%	—	8%
Public Policy Polling (D) (Note: Poll conducted for the DSCC)	June 3–4, 2026	557 (RV)	± 4.2%	46%	46%	—	7%
	June 2, 2026	Primary elections					
Echelon Insights (R) (Note: Poll commissioned by NetChoice)	April 3–9, 2026	377 (LV)	± 6.6%	45%	46%	—	9%
GQR (D)	March 10–16, 2026	1,200 (LV)	± 2.8%	47%	43%	—	11%
Change Research (D)	January 8–11, 2026	1,108 (LV)	—	44%	41%	1% (Note: "Would not vote" with 1%)	14%

Hypothetical polling

Ashley Hinson vs. Nathan Sage

Poll source	Date(s) administered	Sample size	Margin of error	Ashley Hinson (R)	Nathan Sage (D)	Other	Undecided
Change Research (D)	January 8–11, 2026	1,108 (LV)	—	44%	41%	1%	14%

Ashley Hinson vs. Zach Wahls

Poll source	Date(s) administered	Sample size	Margin of error	Ashley Hinson (R)	Zach Wahls (D)	Other	Undecided
Echelon Insights (R)	April 3–9, 2026	377 (LV)	± 6.6%	44%	46%	—	10%
GQR (D)	March 10–16, 2026	1,200 (LV)	± 2.8%	47%	44%	—	9%
Change Research (D)	January 8–11, 2026	1,108 (LV)	—	44%	41%	2% (Note: "Would not vote" with 2%)	13%

Joni Ernst vs. Jackie Norris

Poll source	Date(s) administered	Sample size	Margin of error	Joni Ernst (R)	Jackie Norris (D)	Undecided
Public Policy Polling (D)	August 18–19, 2025	572 (V)	± 4.1%	45%	42%	13%

Joni Ernst vs. Nathan Sage

Poll source	Date(s) administered	Sample size	Margin of error	Joni Ernst (R)	Nathan Sage (D)	Undecided
Public Policy Polling (D)	August 18–19, 2025	572 (V)	± 4.1%	45%	41%	14%

Joni Ernst vs. Josh Turek

Poll source	Date(s) administered	Sample size	Margin of error	Joni Ernst (R)	Josh Turek (D)	Undecided
Public Policy Polling (D)	August 18–19, 2025	572 (V)	± 4.1%	45%	41%	14%

Joni Ernst vs. Zach Wahls

Poll source	Date(s) administered	Sample size	Margin of error	Joni Ernst (R)	Zach Wahls (D)	Undecided
Public Policy Polling (D)	August 18–19, 2025	572 (V)	± 4.1%	43%	42%	15%

Joni Ernst vs. Generic Democrat

Poll source	Date(s) administered	Sample size	Margin of error	Joni Ernst (R)	Generic Democrat	Undecided
Public Policy Polling (D) (Note: Poll sponsored by Senate Majority PAC, which supports Democratic candidates)	June 2–3, 2025	568 (V)	± 4.1%	45%	43%	12%

Generic Republican vs. Generic Democrat

Poll source	Date(s) administered	Sample size	Margin of error	Generic Republican	Generic Democrat	Undecided
co/efficient (R)	September 14–16, 2026	831 (LV)	± 3.4%	48%	43%	9%

=== Debates ===
2026 United States Senate election in Iowa debates
No.	Date	Host	Moderators	Link	Participants	
P Participant A Absent N Non-invitee I Invitee W Withdrawn						
P Participant A Absent N Non-invitee I Invitee W Withdrawn					Josh Turek	Ashley Hinson
1	October 7, 2026	Iowa PBS	Kay Henderson	PBS	P	P

=== Results ===
2026 United States Senate election in Iowa
Party	Candidate	Votes	%	±%
Democratic	Josh Turek	688,741	50.55	+5.36
Republican	Ashley Hinson	631,481	46.36	−5.34
Libertarian	Thomas Laehn	42,109	3.09	+0.88
Total votes		1,362,331	100.0	N/A
Democratic gain from Republican				

Counties that flipped from Republican to Democratic:

- Dallas (largest municipality: Waukee)
- Des Moines (largest municipality: Burlington)
- Dubuque (largest municipality: Dubuque)
- Marshall (largest municipality: Marshalltown)
- Muscatine (largest municipality: Muscatine)
- Pottawattamie (largest municipality: Council Bluffs)
- Winneshiek (largest municipality: Decorah)

==== By congressional district ====
Turek won three congressional districts, including the one Hinson represented, while Hinson won one congressional district.

District	Turek	Hinson	Elected Representative
1st	52.67%	44.07%	Mariannette Miller-Meeks (119th Congress)
1st	52.67%	44.07%	Christina Bohannan (120th Congress)
2nd	51.41%	45.77%	Ashley Hinson (119th Congress)
2nd	51.41%	45.77%	Lindsay James (120th Congress)
3rd	55.11%	42.03%	Zach Nunn (119th Congress)
3rd	55.11%	42.03%	Sarah Trone Garriott (120th Congress)
4th	41.67%	54.82%	Randy Feenstra (119th Congress)
4th	41.67%	54.82%	Chris McGowan (120th Congress)

== Analysis ==
While there were few Republicans who voted for Turek in 2026, Turek won independents by 20%. However, 10% of Trump voters in 2024 backed Turek, while very few Harris voters backed Hinson. Additionally, Rob Sand's landslide victory in the 2026 Iowa gubernatorial election may have produced coattail effects that helped Turek. Despite running about 7 points behind Rob Sand on the same ballot, Turek won Pottawattamie county, where his State House district is, which Sand lost. This made Pottawattamie county one of 13 to split its ticket between the Senate and Gubernatorial elections, and the only one to vote for Turek and Zach Lahn. Boone, Bremer, Buchanan, Cedar, Clinton, Jasper, Lee, Poweshiek, Tama, Wapello, Warren, and Woodbury counties would vote for Rob Sand for governor, and Ashley Hinson for Senate.

=== Exit poll ===
2026 United States Senate election in Iowa (CNN)
Demographic subgroup	Turek	Hinson	% of total vote
Ideology
Liberals	97	1	22
Moderates	67	29	39
Conservatives	9	89	39
Party
Democrats	98	1	28
Republicans	7	90	37
Independents	59	36	35
Donald Trump job approval
Approve	4	95	41
Disapprove	85	11	57
2024 presidential vote
Kamala Harris	97	1	42
Donald Trump	9	88	49
Another candidate	61	19	2
Did not vote	70	21	5
Gender
Men	45	53	48
Women	56	41	51
Income
$100,000 or more	52	46	38
$50,000-$99,999	47	50	34
Less than $50,000	54	42	27
Race/ethnicity
White	49	48	91
Latino	63	36	3
White born-again or evangelical Christian?
Yes	20	78	24
No	61	36	76
Race by gender
White men	44	54	44
White women	54	42	46
All other voters	60	34	10
Age
18–29 years old	66	30	11
30–44 years old	53	40	20
45-64 years old	45	53	34
65 and older	50	48	36
Area type
Urban	67	30	16
Suburban	60	39	28
Rural	41	55	55
Education
College graduate	58	40	38
No college degree	46	50	62
Education by race
White college graduates	58	40	35
Non-white college graduates	65	33	3
Whites without college	44	52	56
Non-whites without college	61	33	6
Education by gender and race
White women with college degrees	62	36	19
White women without college degrees	49	46	27
White men with college degrees	52	45	16
White men without college degrees	39	58	28
Voters of color	64	32	10
Educational attainment
Advanced degree	65	33	14
Bachelor's degree	54	43	24
Associate's degree	43	52	16
Some college	48	49	20
Never attended college	46	51	27

== Notes ==
Partisan clients
