= Joe Mitchell (politician) =

American politician

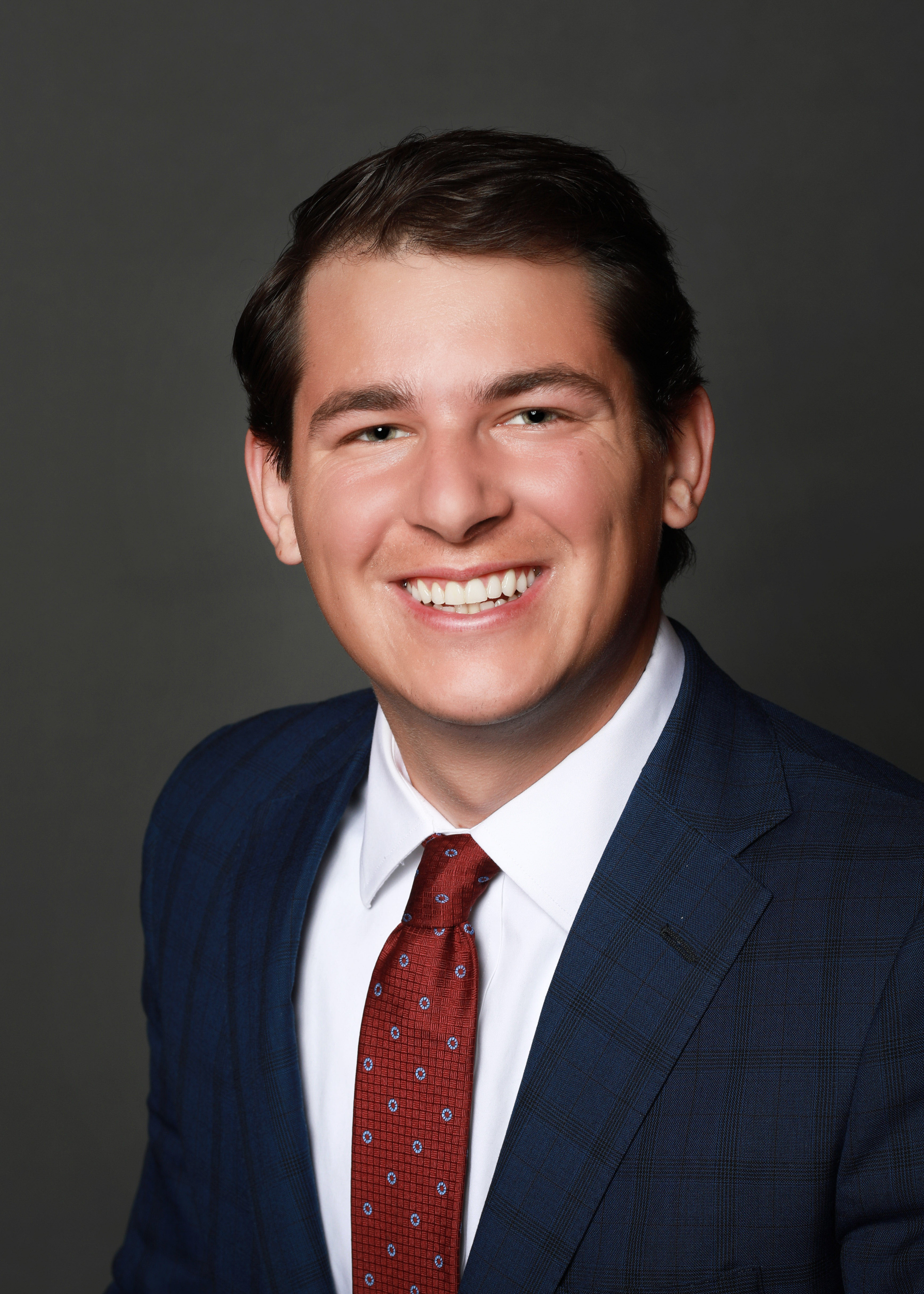
- Official portrait, 2021

Member of the Iowa House of Representatives from the 84th district
- In office January 14, 2019 – January 9, 2023
- Preceded by: Dave Heaton
- Succeeded by: Jeff Shipley (redistricted)

Personal details
- Born: Joseph Paul Mitchell; April 23, 1997 (age 29) Wayland, Iowa, U.S.
- Party: Republican
- Education: Drake University (BS)
- Website: Campaign website

Joseph Paul Mitchell (born April 23, 1997) is an American business owner and politician from the state of Iowa. He served in the Iowa House of Representatives from 2019 to 2023. Sworn in at the age of 21, Mitchell was the youngest person to ever be elected to the Iowa House. He was the Republican nominee in the 2026 election in Iowa's 2nd congressional district, losing to Democrat Lindsay James.

== Early life and education ==
Mitchell's parents are John and Jean Mitchell, the former owners of medical device manufacturer MD Orthopaedics in Wayland.

Mitchell graduated from Waco High School in the WACO Community School District a semester early in December 2014, then served as a legislative page at the Iowa State Capitol in January 2015. He then earned a Bachelor of Science in business administration from Drake University in 2018.

== Business career ==
Mitchell owns and operates a real estate company based in Clear Lake that works to develop housing for rural communities.

== Political career ==
Mitchell was elected to an open seat in the Iowa House of Representatives in the 2018 elections by a 62% to 38% margin. At the time he was 20, making him the youngest Iowan to ever serve in the legislature. He served as a House Assistant Leader and he served on the following committees: Administration and Rules, Commerce, Judiciary, State Government, Ways and Means, and the RIFF Budget Subcommittee. He was reelected with 71% of the vote in 2020.

In 2022, Mitchell lost to fellow state Representative Jeff Shipley in the Republican primary after redistricting placed both of their homes in the same district.

Following his defeat, Mitchell became a resident fellow at Harvard University in 2023. In late 2024, Mitchell joined President-elect Donald Trump's 2024 transition team. After Trump's inauguration in January 2025, he worked as chief of staff in the Federal Housing Finance Agency before being appointed as Regional Administrator for the U.S. Department of Housing and Urban Development of the Great Plains Region in late July 2025.

=== 2026 U.S. House election ===
In September 2025, Mitchell announced that he would run for the U.S. House of Representatives in Iowa's 2nd congressional district, seeking to succeed Republican Ashley Hinson, who ran for U.S. Senate. Endorsed by Donald Trump and Mike Johnson, Mitchell won the Republican primary against State Sen. Charlie McClintock.

In the ensuing campaign, he and his opponent, Democrat Lindsay James, both pledged to address affordability. He campaigned in favor of cutting regulations on housing development, arguing that this would increase affordable housing. Mitchell voiced his support for a trade policy based on tariffs and said he did not support a war powers resolution to end the Iran war. He also ran on an anti-corruption platform, pledging not to accept money from corporate PACs and to limit the ability of members of Congress to trade individual stocks. In October 2026, Mitchell joined President Donald Trump on stage and presented him with a self-created "Man of the Century Award." James won the election, flipping the seat to Democrat.

== Personal life ==
Mitchell was friendly with Charlie Kirk, founder of Turning Point USA, whom he first met in 2019. He has said he was profoundly affected by Kirk's assassination.

Mitchell is the founder of Run Gen Z, a nonprofit with the mission to "prepare Generation Z leaders to take action, take charge and take control of the future by supporting the vision of the founders of this country and supporting conservative political values such as limited government, free market capitalism, individual responsibility and fiscal restraint." He is credited with inspiring Elliott Engen to run for office after meeting at a Turning Point USA Student Action Summit.
