= Jim Carlin (politician) =

American politician (born 1962)

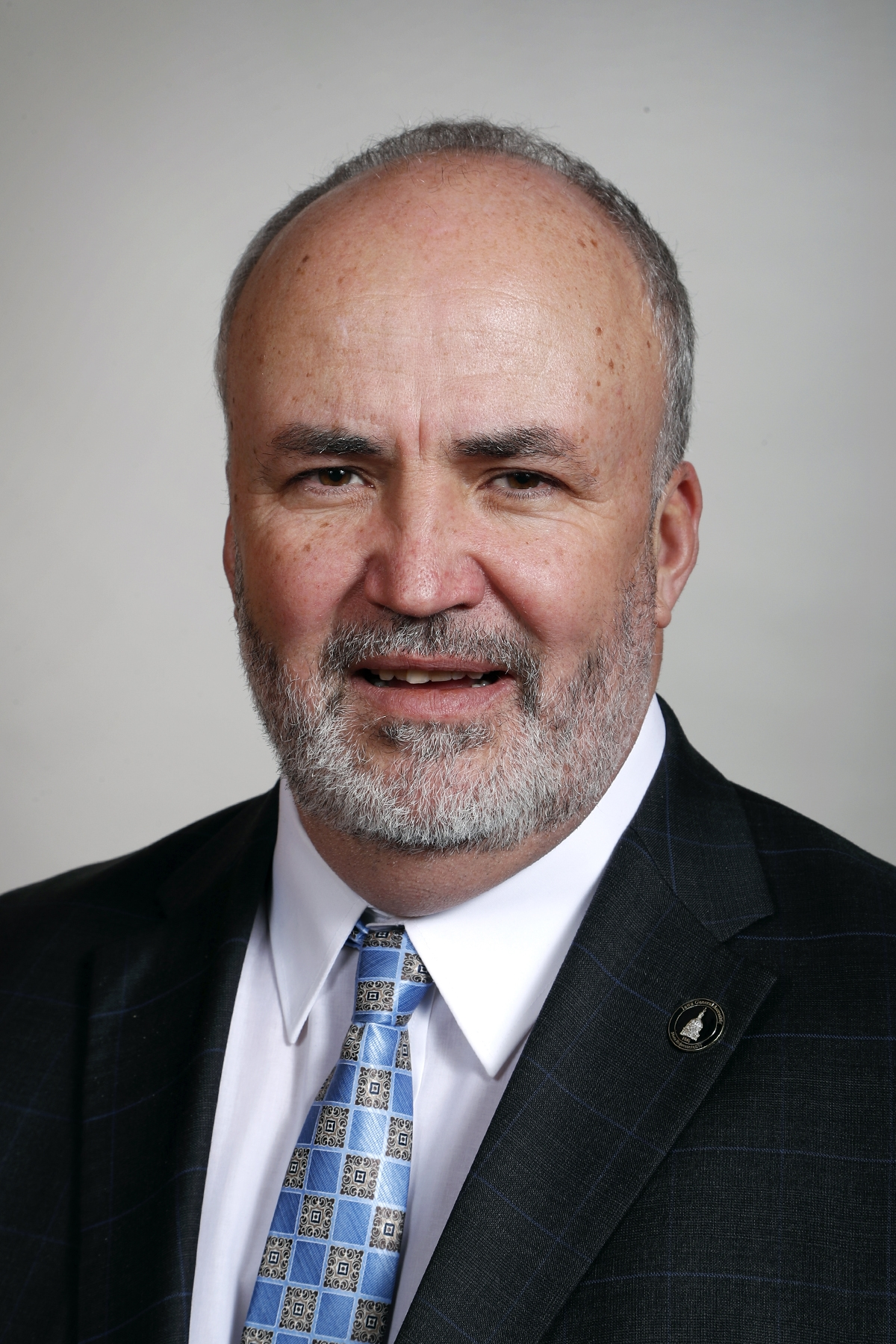
- Official portrait, 2017

Member of the Iowa Senate from the 3rd district
- In office December 12, 2017 – January 12, 2023
- Preceded by: Bill Anderson
- Succeeded by: Lynn Evans

Member of the Iowa House of Representatives from the 6th district
- In office January 9, 2017 – December 12, 2017
- Preceded by: Ron Jorgensen
- Succeeded by: Jacob Bossman

Personal details
- Born: October 19, 1962 (age 63) Pittsfield, Massachusetts, U.S.
- Party: Republican
- Spouse: Donna
- Children: 3
- Education: University of Massachusetts, Amherst (BA); Marquette University (JD)

Military service
- Branch/service: United States Army
- Years of service: 1983–1985

Jim Carlin (born October 19, 1962) is an American attorney and politician who served as the Iowa State Senator from the 3rd district from 2017 to 2023. A member of the Republican Party, he won a special election against challenger Todd Wendt following the resignation of incumbent Bill Anderson. Carlin was a candidate for the Republican nomination in the 2022 United States Senate election and the 2026 United States Senate election.

== Early life and education ==
Carlin was born in Pittsfield, Massachusetts. He earned a Bachelor of Arts degree in economics from the University of Massachusetts Amherst and a Juris Doctor from the Marquette University Law School.

== Career ==
Carlin served in the United States Army from 1983 to 1985. After moving to northwest Iowa, he founded the Carlin Law Office, where he specializes in malpractice and injury litigation. He was a member of the Iowa House of Representatives in 2017, having represented the 6th district after previous incumbent Ron Jorgensen retired. Later that year, he was elected to the Iowa Senate.

Following the 2020 presidential election, Carlin supported unfounded conspiracy theories that Democrats stole the election. After President Donald Trump refused to concede, Carlin made claims of fraud. Carlin said, "Who believes that Joe Biden got 12 million more votes than Barack Obama on his best day? I don't." In 2021, Carlin proposed that universities would be required to catalogue the political affiliations of faculty.

In February 2021, Carlin announced his candidacy for the Republican nomination in the 2022 United States Senate election in Iowa. During his campaign, Carlin criticized incumbent Chuck Grassley for voting to certify the 2020 election results.

In April 2025, Carlin announced his candidacy for the 2026 United States Senate election in Iowa. He lost the Republican primary to Ashley Hinson.

== Personal life ==
He live in Sioux City, Iowa, with his wife, Donna, and their three children.
