= 2026 United States House of Representatives elections in Iowa =

- November 3, 2026

All 4 Iowa seats to the United States House of Representatives
	Majority party	Minority party
Party	Democratic	Republican
Last election	0	4
Seats won	3	1
Seat change	▲3	▼3
Popular vote	667,197	650,670
Percentage	49.52%	48.29%
Swing	▲6.28%	▼7.91%

Democratic gain
Republican hold
Democratic
40–50%
50–60%
60–70%
70–80%
Republican
40–50%
50–60%
60–70%
70–80%
80–90%

The 2026 United States House of Representatives elections in Iowa were held on November 3, 2026, to elect the four U.S. representatives from the state of Iowa, one from each of the state's congressional districts. The elections coincided with other elections to the House of Representatives, elections to the United States Senate, and various state and local elections. The primary elections took place on June 2, 2026.

Following the 2026 elections, every congressional districts flipped to Democrats except the 4th district, which remained Republican, concurrently with the Senate and gubernatorial elections also flipped to Democrats, leaving a 3–1 Democratic majority.

== Statewide polling ==
=== Statewide congressional polls ===
Poll source	Date(s) administered	Sample size (Note: Key: A – all adults RV – registered voters LV – likely voters V – unclear)	Margin of error	Democratic	Republican	Other	Undecided
co/efficient	October 15–19, 2026	863 (LV)	± 3.32%	46%	48%	–	6%
Marist University	October 8–11, 2026	(LV)	± 6.6%	47%	50%	2% (Note: "Another party's candidate" & "No response" with 1%)	2%
Marist University	September 17–20, 2026	1,050 (RV)	± 4.4%	50%	44%	3% (Note: "Another party's candidate" with 2%; "No response" with >1%)	3%

== District 1 ==
2026 Iowa's 1st congressional district election
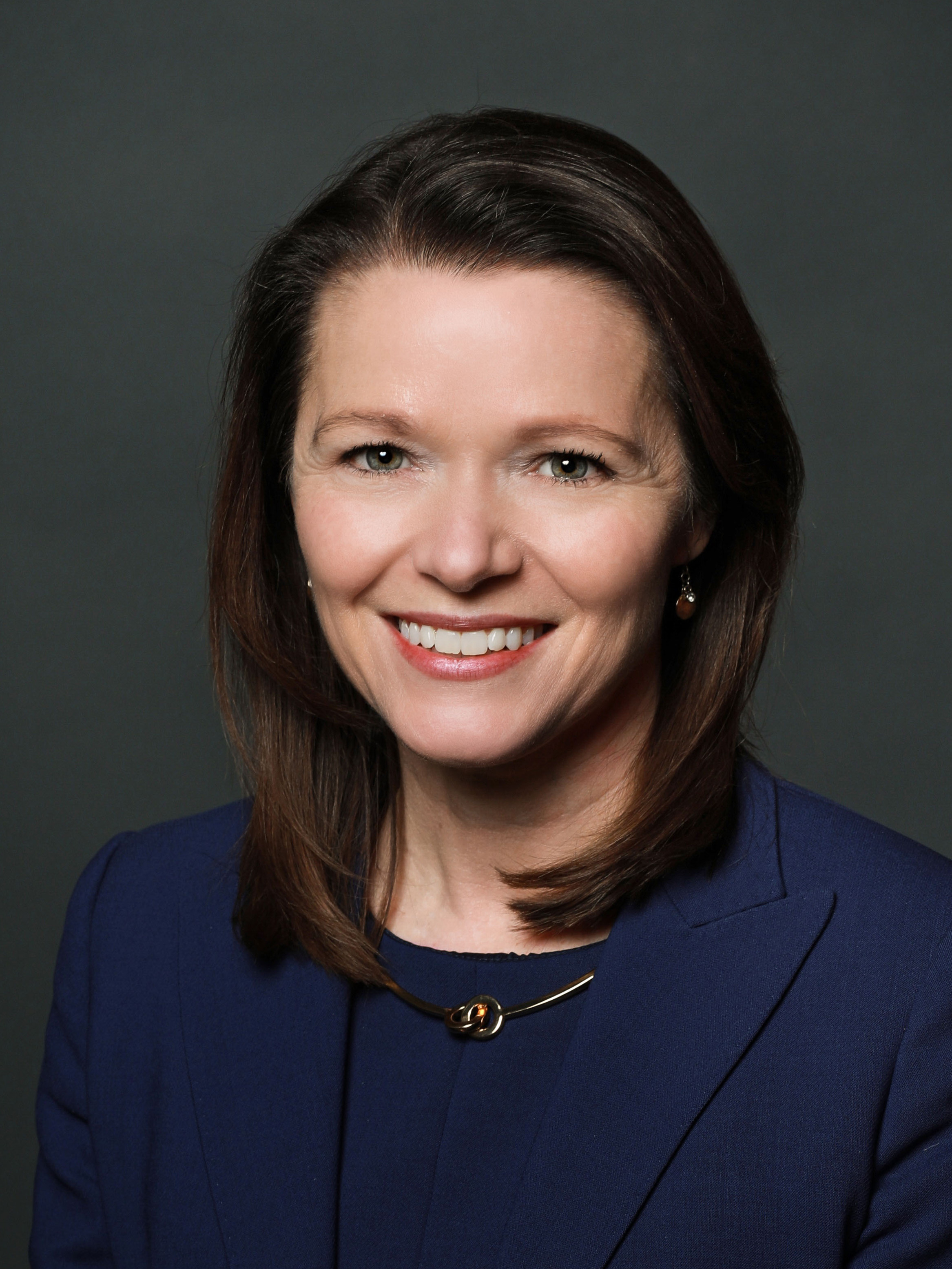

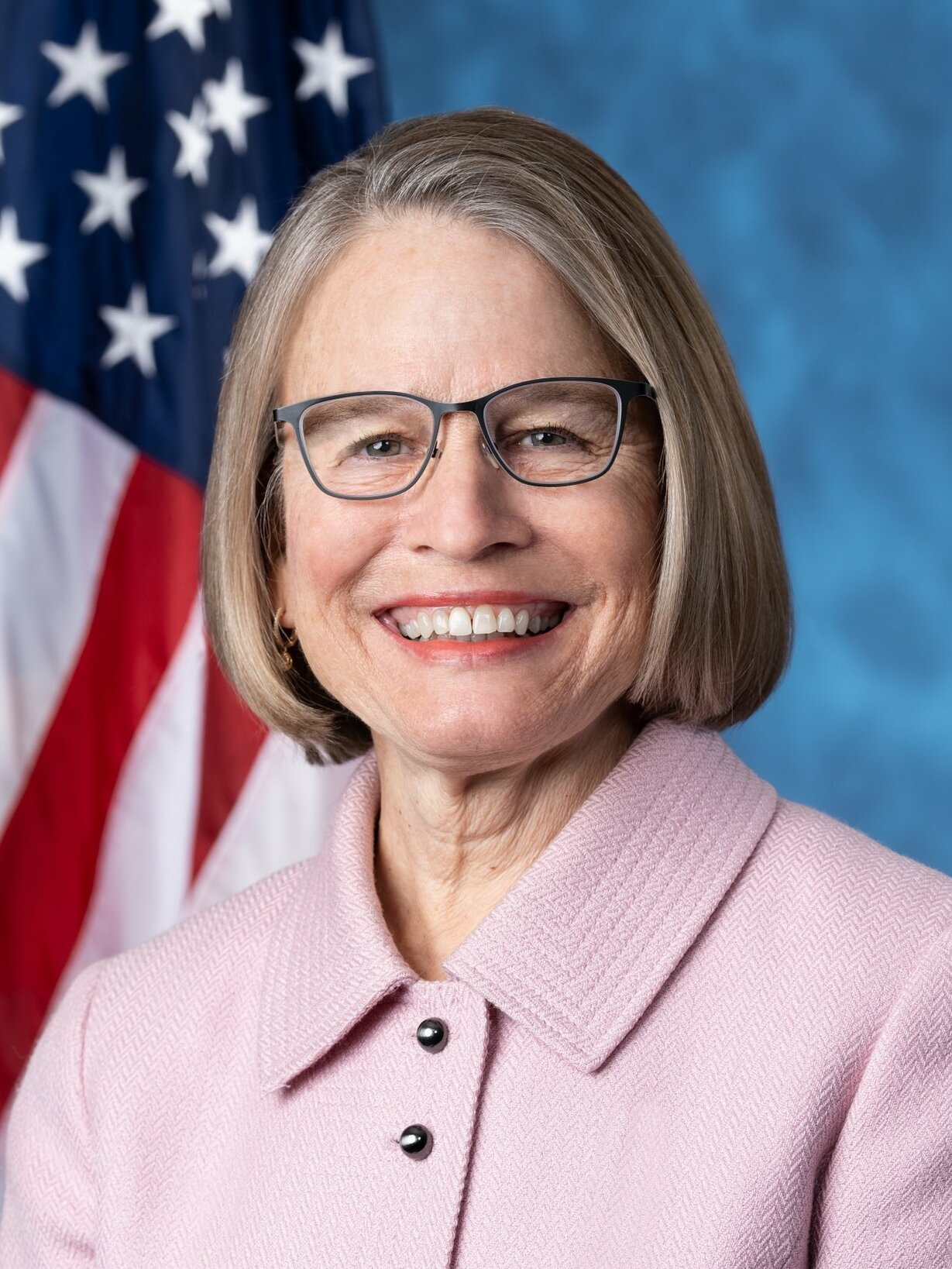
Nominee	Christina Bohannan	Mariannette Miller-Meeks
Party	Democratic	Republican
Popular vote	184,144	150,926
Percentage	53.0%	43.4%
- Bohannan: 40–50% 50–60% 70–80% Miller-Meeks: 50–60% 60–70%
U.S. Representative before election
Mariannette Miller-Meeks
Republican
Elected U.S. Representative
Christina Bohannan
Democratic

This district is based in the southeastern part of the state and includes the cities of Davenport and Iowa City. The incumbent is Republican Mariannette Miller-Meeks, who was re-elected with 50.0% of the vote in 2024. This win was the narrowest of any incumbent House Republican in 2024.

The election was one of the most expensive congressional races in the 2026 elections, with over $51.5 million in spending.

=== Republican primary ===
==== Nominee ====
- Mariannette Miller-Meeks, incumbent U.S. representative (2021–present)

==== Eliminated in primary ====
- David Pautsch, ministry founder and candidate for this district in 2024

==== Declined ====
- Grant Hill, nonprofit founder and convicted felon

==== Endorsements ====
Mariannette Miller-Meeks

Executive branch officials

- Donald Trump, president of the United States (2017–2021, 2025–present)

U.S. representatives

- Tom Emmer, House majority whip (2023–present) from MN-06 (2015–present)
- Mike Johnson, speaker of the House (2023–present) from LA-04 (2017–present)

Organizations

- AIPAC
- Americans for Prosperity
- ClearPath Action Fund
- Log Cabin Republicans
- Maggie's List
- Republican Jewish Coalition
- Susan B. Anthony Pro-Life America
- Turning Point Action

==== Fundraising ====
Campaign finance reports as of May 13, 2026
Candidate	Raised	Spent	Cash on hand
Mariannette Miller-Meeks (R)	$6,171,913	$2,298,792	$4,246,864
David Pautsch (R)	$57,495	$53,302	$9,892
Source: Federal Election Commission

==== Results ====
Results by county: Miller-Meeks: 60–70%; 70–80%

Republican primary results
Party	Candidate	Votes	%
Republican	Mariannette Miller-Meeks (incumbent)	35,182	71.5
Republican	David Pautsch	13,957	28.4
Total votes		49,139	100.0

=== Democratic primary ===
==== Nominee ====
- Christina Bohannan, former state representative from the 85th district (2021–2023) and nominee for this district in 2022 and 2024

==== Eliminated in primary ====
- Travis Terrell, healthcare worker

==== Withdrawn ====
- Bob Krause, former state representative from the 7th district (1973–1978) and perennial candidate (ran for U.S. Senate, endorsed Bohannan)
- Taylor Wettach, attorney (ran for state auditor)

==== Endorsements ====
Christina Bohannan

U.S. representatives

- Suzan DelBene, WA-01 (2012–present)
- Abby Finkenauer, former IA-01 (2019–2021)
- Lois Frankel, FL-22 (2013–present)
- Gabby Giffords, former AZ-08 (2007–2012)
- Dave Loebsack, former IA-02 (2007–2021)
- Greg Stanton, AZ-04 (2019–present)

State legislators

- Bob Krause, former HD-07 (1973–1978) and withdrawn candidate
- Brian Meyer, minority leader of the Iowa House of Representatives (2025–present) from HD-29 (2013–present)
- Janice Weiner, minority leader of the Iowa Senate (2025–present) from SD-45 (2023–present)

Labor unions

- American Federation of Government Employees

Organizations

- 314 Action Fund
- DCCC Red to Blue
- Elect Democratic Women
- EMILYs List
- Giffords
- J Street
- Jewish Democratic Council of America
- League of Conservation Voters Action Fund
- NewDem Action Fund
- Reproductive Freedom for All
- Vote Common Good
- WelcomePAC
Travis Terrell

Organizations

- Track AIPAC

==== Fundraising ====
Campaign finance reports as of May 13, 2026
Candidate	Raised	Spent	Cash on hand
Christina Bohannan (D)	$5,646,240	$1,418,406	$4,335,052
Travis Terrell (D)	$20,937	$14,804	$5,007
Source: Federal Election Commission

==== Results ====
Results by county: Bohannan: 70–80%; 80–90%

Democratic primary results
Party	Candidate	Votes	%
Democratic	Christina Bohannan	42,862	81.5
Democratic	Travis Terrell	9,761	18.5
Total votes		52,623	100.0

=== Independents ===
==== Declared ====
- Michael Bridgford, independent financial advisor

=== General election ===
==== Predictions ====
Source	Ranking	As of
The Cook Political Report	Lean D (flip)	October 9, 2026
Decision Desk HQ	Likely D (flip)	September 25, 2026
Inside Elections	Tilt D (flip)	October 1, 2026
Sabato's Crystal Ball	Lean D (flip)	September 22, 2026
Silver Bulletin	Lean D (flip)	August 20, 2026

==== Post-primary endorsements ====
Mariannette Miller-Meeks (R)

Executive branch officials

- Scott Bessent, secretary of the treasury (2025–present)
- Robert F. Kennedy Jr., secretary of health and human services (2025–present) (Independent)
- Markwayne Mullin, secretary of homeland security (2026–present)
- Brooke Rollins, secretary of agriculture (2025–present)

U.S. senators

- Rick Scott, Florida (2019–present)

U.S. representatives

- Ashley Hinson, IA-2 (2021–present) and 2026 U.S. senate nominee

Individuals

- Zach Lahn, businessman and 2026 gubernatorial nominee

Organizations

- U.S. Chamber of Commerce
Christina Bohannan (D)

Labor unions

- National Education Association

Organizations

- Human Rights Campaign
- National Women's Political Caucus
- Planned Parenthood Action Fund
Michael Bridgford (I)

U.S. senators

- Joe Manchin, former West Virginia (2010–2025) (Independent; Democratic until 2024)

Organizations

- Forward Party

==== Fundraising ====
Campaign finance reports as of October 14, 2026
Candidate	Raised	Spent	Cash on hand
Mariannette Miller-Meeks (R)	$9,101,898	$7,774,924	$1,700,717
Christina Bohannan (D)	$9,905,570	$7,901,941	$2,110,846
Michael Bridgford (I)	$338,285	$261,555	$76,730
Source: Federal Election Commission

==== Polling ====
Mariannette Miller-Meeks vs. Christina Bohannan vs. Michael Bridgford

Poll source	Date(s) administered	Sample size	Margin of error	Mariannette Miller-Meeks (R)	Christina Bohannan (D)	Michael Bridgford (I)	Undecided
Wavefield Research	September 29 – October 2, 2026	297 (LV)	± 5.7%	29%	45%	18%	9%
The Bullfinch Group/Independent Center	July 13–16, 2026	705 (LV)	± 3.7%	35%	40%	11%	11%
Public Policy Polling (D) (Note: Poll sponsored by House Majority PAC, which is focused on electing Democrats to the U.S. House of Representatives)	June 18–19, 2025	555 (V)	–	39%	43%	–	18%

Hypothetical polling

Generic Republican vs. generic Democrat

Poll source	Date(s) administered	Sample size	Margin of error	Generic Republican	Generic Democrat	Undecided
Public Policy Polling (D)	June 18–19, 2025	555 (V)	–	45%	42%	13%

==== Debates ====
Michael Bridgford was excluded from the only debate due to a million-dollar fundraising requirement. All three candidates were invited to an Iowa PBS debate, but the major-party candidates refused to debate the independent and the debate was not held.

2026 United States House election in Iowa (District 1) debates
No.	Date	Host	Moderators	Link	Participants		
P Participant A Absent N Non-invitee I Invitee W Withdrawn							
P Participant A Absent N Non-invitee I Invitee W Withdrawn					Christina Bohannan	Mariannette Miller-Meeks	Michael Bridgford
1	October 20, 2026	St. Ambrose University; KWQC/KCRG/KTIV	Matt Christensen; Jim Mertens	KWQC	P	P	N

==== Results ====
2026 Iowa's 1st congressional district election
Party	Candidate	Votes	%	±%
Democratic	Christina Bohannan	184,144	53.0%	+4.2
Republican	Mariannette Miller-Meeks (incumbent)	150,926	43.4%	–6.6
Independent	Michael Bridgford	12,656	3.6%	N/A
Total votes		347,726	100.0	

== District 2 ==
2026 Iowa's 2nd congressional district election
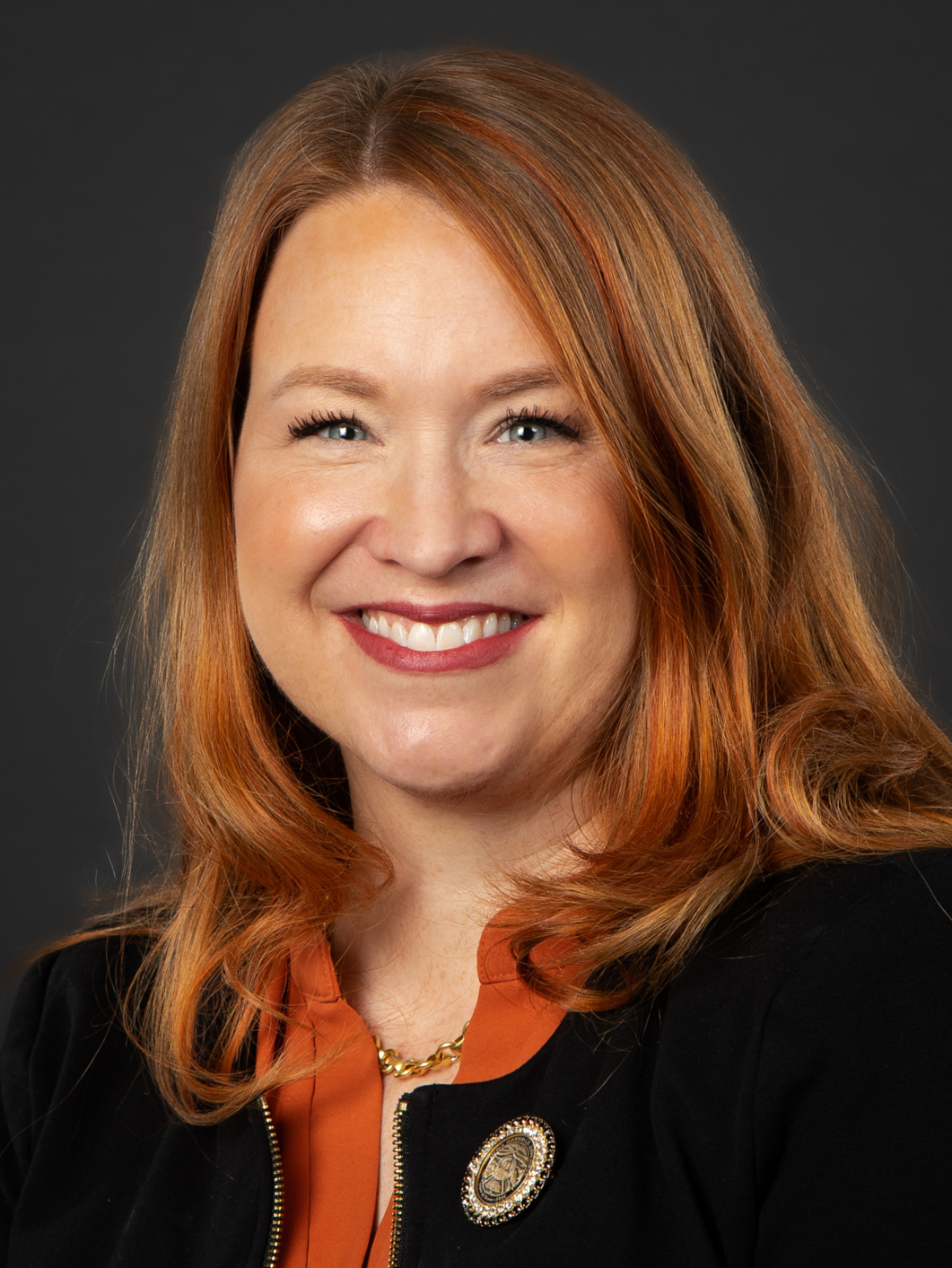

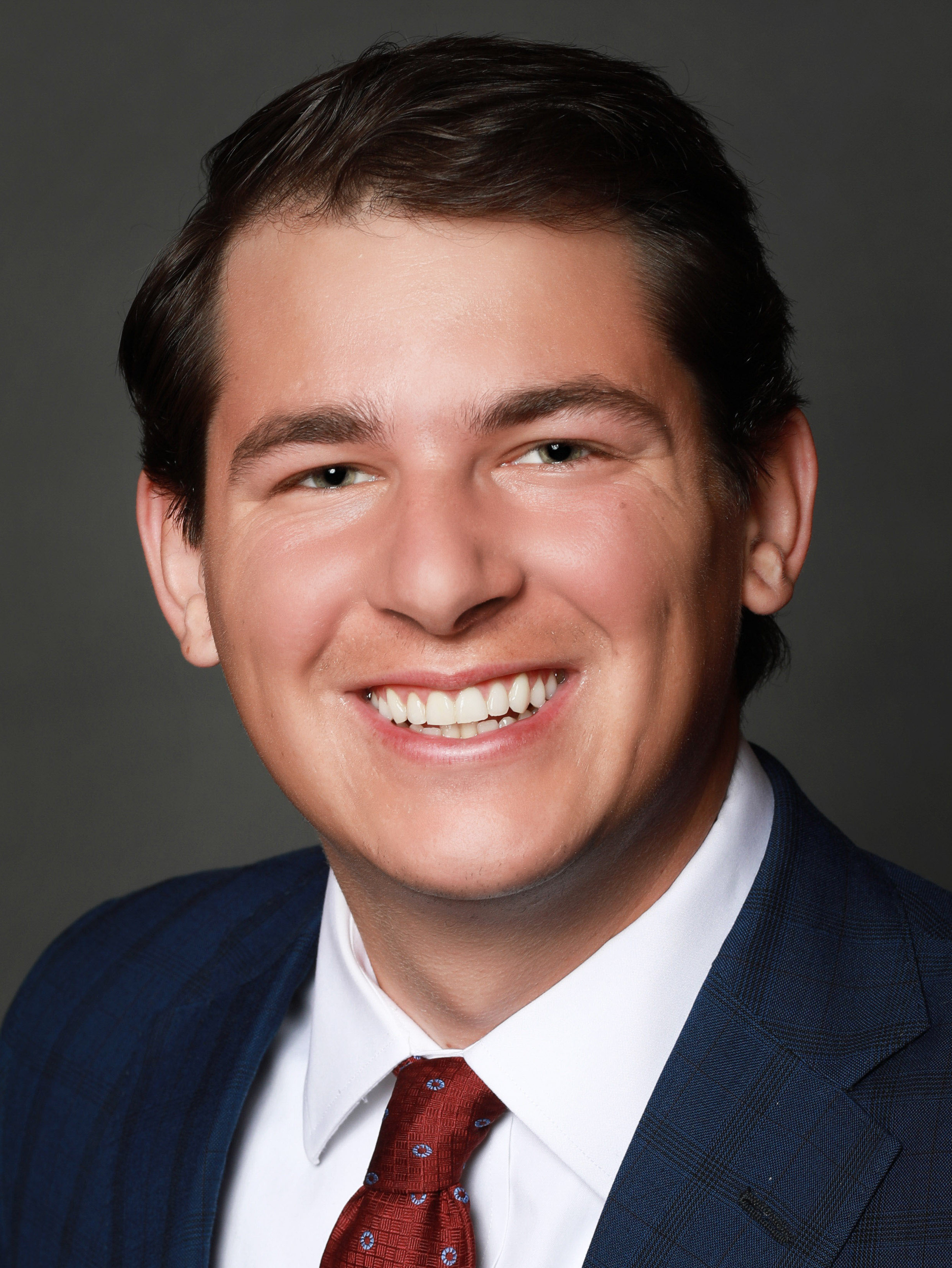
Nominee	Lindsay James	Joe Mitchell
Party	Democratic	Republican
Popular vote	171,604	157,773
Percentage	49.5%	45.6%
- James: 40–50% 50–60% Mitchell: 40–50% 50–60% 60–70%
U.S. Representative before election
Ashley Hinson
Republican
Elected U.S. Representative
Lindsay James
Democratic

The 2nd district is based in northeastern Iowa and contains the cities of Cedar Rapids, Waterloo, and Dubuque. The incumbent is Republican Ashley Hinson, who was re-elected with 57.1% of the vote in 2024. Hinson is not seeking re-election, instead running for U.S. Senate.

=== Republican primary ===
==== Nominee ====
- Joe Mitchell, former state representative from the 84th district (2019–2023)

==== Eliminated in primary ====
- Charlie McClintock, state senator from the 42nd district (2023–present)

==== Withdrawn ====
- Rod Blum, former U.S. representative (2015–2019)
- Ashley Hinson, incumbent U.S. representative (ran for U.S. Senate)
- Shannon Lundgren, state representative from the 65th district (2017–present) (ran for re-election)

==== Endorsements ====
Joe Mitchell

Executive branch officials

- Donald Trump, president of the United States (2017–2021, 2025–present)

U.S. representatives

- Tom Emmer, House majority whip (2023–present) from MN-06 (2015–present)
- Brandon Gill, TX-26 (2025–present)
- Richard Hudson, NC-09 (2013–present)
- Mike Johnson, speaker of the House (2023–present) from LA-04 (2017–present)
- Jim Jordan, OH-04 (2007–present)
- Anna Paulina Luna, FL-13 (2023–present)
- Steve Scalise, House majority leader (2023–present) from LA-01 (2008–present)

State legislators

- Bobby Kaufmann, majority leader of the Iowa House of Representatives (2025–present) from HD-82 (2013–present)

Organizations

- NRCC MAGA Majority
- Turning Point Action
- U.S. Chamber of Commerce
Ashley Hinson (withdrawn)

Organizations

- AIPAC
Shannon Lundgren (withdrawn)

U.S. representatives

- David Young, former IA-03 (2015–2019)

Statewide officials

- Chris Cournoyer, lieutenant governor of Iowa (2024–present)

State legislators

- 4 state representatives (Note: Brian Best, former HD-11 (2015–2025); Barb Kniff McCulla, HD-37 (2023–present); Gary Mohr, HD-93 (2017–present); Jennifer Smith, HD-72 (2025–present))

Organizations

- Maggie's List

==== Fundraising ====
Campaign finance reports as of May 13, 2026
Candidate	Raised	Spent	Cash on hand
Charlie McClintock (R)	$17,322	$1,201	$16,121
Joe Mitchell (R)	$1,560,824	$683,158	$877,666
Source: Federal Election Commission

==== Results ====
Results by county: Mitchell: 50–60%; 60–70%; 70–80%; McClintock: 50–60%

Republican primary results
Party	Candidate	Votes	%
Republican	Joe Mitchell	24,413	61.5
Republican	Charlie McClintock	15,264	38.5
Total votes		39,677	100.0

=== Democratic primary ===
==== Nominee ====
- Lindsay James, state representative from the 71st district (2019–present)

==== Eliminated in primary ====
- Kathy Dolter, former dean of nursing at Kirkwood Community College
- Clint Twedt-Ball, nonprofit founder

==== Withdrawn ====
- Kevin Techau, former U.S. attorney for the northern district of Iowa (2014–2017) (endorsed James)

==== Endorsements ====
Lindsay James

Executive branch officials

- Kevin Techau, former attorney for the northern district of Iowa (2014–2017)

U.S. representatives

- Abby Finkenauer, former IA-01 (2019–2021)
- Lois Frankel, FL-22 (2013–present)
- Dave Loebsack, former IA-02 (2007–2021)

State legislators

- Liz Mathis, SD-34 (2011–present)

Individuals

- Kate Mulgrew, actress

Labor unions

- American Federation of Government Employees
- Teamsters Iowa

Organizations

- EMILYs List
- End Citizens United
- Vote Common Good
Clint Twedt-Ball

State legislators

- Rob Hogg, former SD-33 (2007–2023)
- Art Staed, SD-40 (2025–present)

==== Fundraising ====
Campaign finance reports as of May 13, 2026
Candidate	Raised	Spent	Cash on hand
Kathy Dolter (D)	$73,292	$71,310	$1,982
Lindsay James (D)	$872,614	$633,389	$239,225
Clint Twedt-Ball (D)	$537,637	$463,503	$74,133
Source: Federal Election Commission

==== Debates ====
2026 United States House election in Iowa (District 2) Democratic primary debates
No.	Date	Host	Moderators	Link	Participants		
P Participant A Absent N Non-invitee I Invitee W Withdrawn							
P Participant A Absent N Non-invitee I Invitee W Withdrawn					Lindsay James	Clint Twedt-Ball	Kathy Dolter
1	May 13, 2026	KCRG and KWQC	Jim Mertens and Matt Christensen	KCRG	P	P	P

==== Results ====
Results by county: James: 40–50%; 50–60%; 60–70%; 70–80%; 80–90%

Democratic primary results
Party	Candidate	Votes	%
Democratic	Lindsay James	27,717	57.8
Democratic	Clint Twedt-Ball	11,529	24.1
Democratic	Kathy Dolter	8,669	18.1
Total votes		47,915	100.0

=== Libertarian primary ===
==== Filed paperwork ====
- Rick Stewart, perennial candidate

=== Independents ===
==== Declared ====
- Dave Bushaw, community organizer

==== Endorsements ====
Dave Bushaw

Organizations

- Forward Party

==== Fundraising ====
Campaign finance reports as of May 13, 2026
Candidate	Raised	Spent	Cash on hand
Dave Bushaw (I)	$13,562	$11,021	$2,477
Source: Federal Election Commission

=== General election ===
==== Predictions ====
Source	Ranking	As of
The Cook Political Report	Tossup	October 16, 2026
Decision Desk HQ	Tossup	September 25, 2026
Inside Elections	Tossup	October 15, 2026
Sabato's Crystal Ball	Lean D (flip)	October 20, 2026
Silver Bulletin	Tossup	August 20, 2026

==== Post-primary endorsements ====
Joe Mitchell (R)

Individuals

- Riley Gaines, conservative activist and former swimmer

Organizations

- MAHA Action
- MAHA PAC
Lindsay James (D)

U.S. representatives

- Suzan DelBene, WA-01 (2012–present)

Individuals

- Matthew Yglesias, journalist

Labor unions

- National Education Association

Organizations

- DCCC Red to Blue
- J Street
- Jewish Democratic Council of America
- National Women's Political Caucus
- Reproductive Freedom for All

==== Fundraising ====
Campaign finance reports as of October 14, 2026
Candidate	Raised	Spent	Cash on hand
Joe Mitchell (R)	$2,916,069	$2,370,535	$545,534
Lindsay James (D)	$3,917,994	$3,652,041	$265,953
Dave Bushaw (I)	$38,292	$26,910	$11,318
Source: Federal Election Commission

==== Polling ====
Poll source	Date(s) administered	Sample size	Margin of error	Joe Mitchell (R)	Lindsay James (D)	Undecided
Emerson College (Note: Poll sponsored by Poll Vault)	October 12–14, 2026	344 (LV)	–	47%	50%	3%
Global Strategy Group (D)	July 14–19, 2026	—	—	45%	46%	9%
Public Policy Polling (D) (Note: Poll sponsored by James's campaign)	April 13–14, 2026	675 (RV)	± 3.2%	33%	36%	31%

==== Debates ====
2026 United States House election in Iowa (District 2) debates
No.	Date	Host	Moderators	Link	Participants	
P Participant A Absent N Non-invitee I Invitee W Withdrawn						
P Participant A Absent N Non-invitee I Invitee W Withdrawn					Lindsay James	Joe Mitchell
1	October 1, 2026	Iowa's News Now	Skylar Tallal and Ray Baccari	Iowa's News Now	P	P
2	October 8, 2026	Iowa PBS	Kay Henderson	Iowa PBS	P	P

==== Results ====
2026 Iowa's 2nd congressional district election
Party	Candidate	Votes	%	±%
Democratic	Lindsay James	171,604	49.5%	+8.0
Republican	Joe Mitchell	157,773	45.6%	–11.5
Libertarian	Rick Stewart	9,505	2.7%	N/A
Independent	Dave Bushaw	7,477	2.2%	N/A
Total votes		346,359	100.0	

== District 3 ==
2026 Iowa's 3rd congressional district election
- Reporting: 98.8% as of 3:14 PM CST
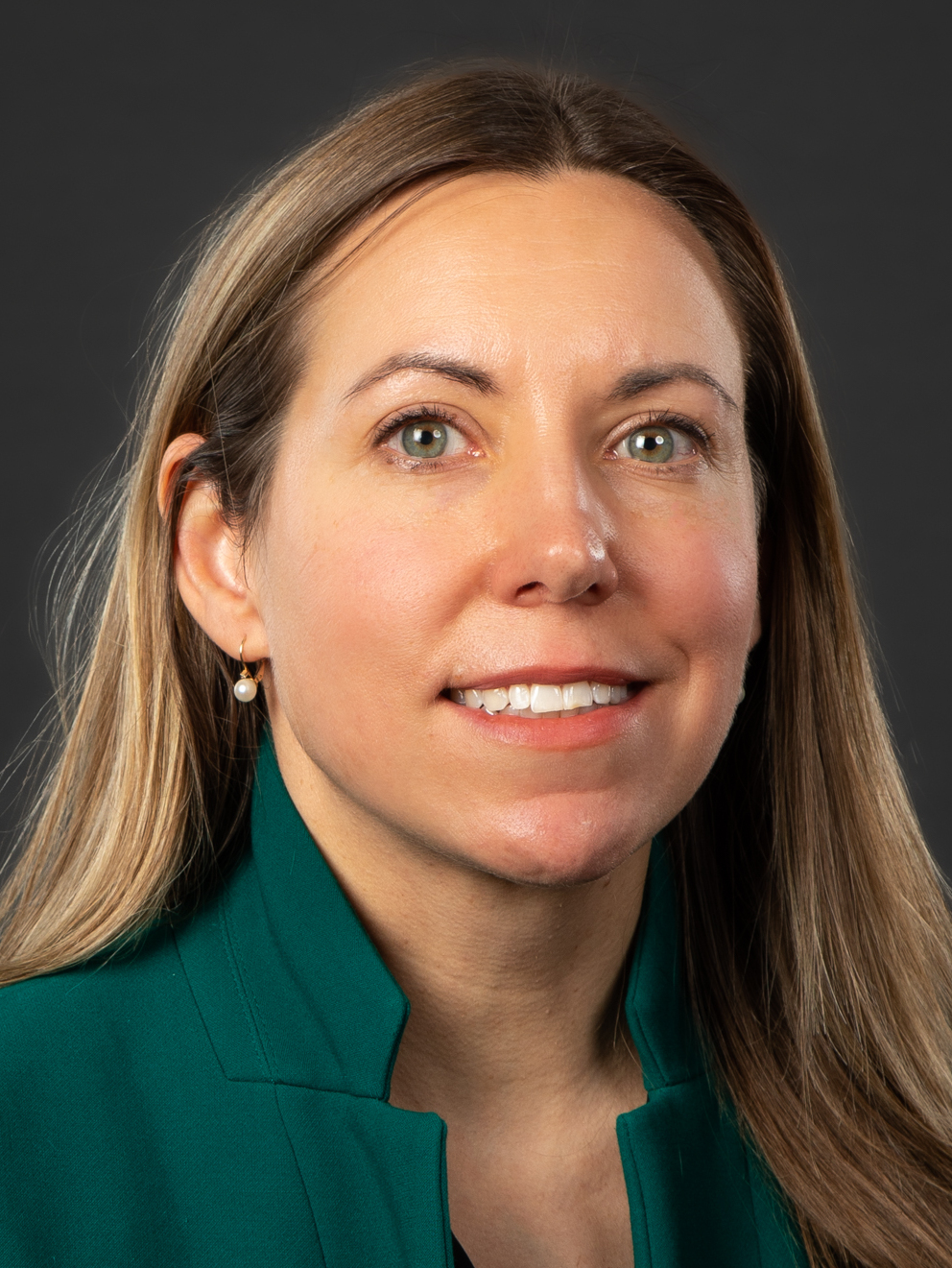

Nominee	Sarah Trone Garriott	Zach Nunn
Party	Democratic	Republican
Popular vote	189,435	163,687
Percentage	53.6%	46.4%
- Garriott: 50–60% 60–70% Nunn: 50–60% 60–70% 70–80%
U.S. Representative before election
Zach Nunn
Republican
Elected U.S. Representative
Sarah Trone Garriott
Democratic

The 3rd district is based in southwestern Iowa and includes the city of Des Moines. The incumbent is Republican Zach Nunn, who was re-elected with 51.8% of the vote in 2024.

=== Republican primary ===
==== Nominee ====
- Zach Nunn, incumbent U.S. representative

==== Endorsements ====
Zach Nunn

Executive branch officials

- Pete Hegseth, secretary of defense (2025–present)
- Donald Trump, president of the United States (2017–2021, 2025–present)
- JD Vance, vice president of the United States (2025–present)

U.S. representatives

- Mike Johnson, speaker of the House (2023–present) from LA-04 (2017–present)
- Jim Jordan, OH-04 (2007–present)

Organizations

- AIPAC
- Republican Jewish Coalition
- Turning Point Action

==== Fundraising ====
Campaign finance reports as of May 13, 2026
Candidate	Raised	Spent	Cash on hand
Zach Nunn (R)	$4,146,939	$1,039,267	$3,160,505
Source: Federal Election Commission

==== Results ====
Republican primary results
Party	Candidate	Votes	%
Republican	Zach Nunn (incumbent)	48,309	100.0
Total votes		48,309	100.0

=== Democratic primary ===
==== Nominee ====
- Sarah Trone Garriott, state senator from the 14th district (2021–present)

==== Disqualified ====
- Xavier Carrigan, voice actor and candidate for Ohio's 5th congressional district in 2020

==== Withdrawn ====
- Jennifer Konfrst, minority leader of the Iowa House of Representatives (2021–2025) from the 32nd district (2019–present) (endorsed Trone Garriott)

==== Declined ====
- Austin Baeth, state representative from the 31st district (2023–present)

==== Endorsements ====
Sarah Trone Garriott

U.S. senators

- Elissa Slotkin, Michigan (2025–present)

U.S. representatives

- Suzan DelBene, WA-01 (2012–present)
- Lois Frankel, FL-22 (2013–present)
- Gabby Giffords, former AZ-08 (2007–2012)
- Greg Stanton, AZ-04 (2019–present)

State legislators

- Izaah Knox, SD-17 (2023–present)
- Jennifer Konfrst, minority leader of the Iowa House of Representatives (2021–2025) from HD-32 (2019–present) and former candidate for this district
- Brian Meyer, minority leader of the Iowa House of Representatives (2025–present) from HD-29 (2015–present)
- Megan Srinivas, HD-30 (2023–present)

Labor unions

- American Federation of Government Employees
- Iron Workers Local 67
- Teamsters Local 238

Organizations

- DCCC Red to Blue
- Elect Democratic Women
- Emily's List
- End Citizens United
- Future Forum
- J Street
- NewDem Action Fund
- Reproductive Freedom for All
- Vote Mama
- WelcomePAC
Jennifer Konfrst (withdrawn)

Executive branch officials

- Bonnie Campbell, former director of the Office on Violence Against Women (1995–2001)

U.S. senators

- Cory Booker, New Jersey (2013–present)

U.S. representatives

- Dave Loebsack, former IA-02 (2007–2021)

State legislators

- Claire Celsi, former SD-16 (2019–2025) (deceased)
- Molly Donahue, SD-37 (2023–present)
- Pam Jochum, former minority leader of the Iowa Senate (2023–2025) from SD-36 (2009–2025)
- 19 state representatives

Labor unions

- Communications Workers of America Local 7102
- Teamsters Local 90
- UA Plumbers and Steamfitters Local 33

Organizations

- Vote Common Good

==== Fundraising ====
Campaign finance reports as of May 13, 2026
Candidate	Raised	Spent	Cash on hand
Sarah Trone Garriott (D)	$3,892,746	$1,186,605	$2,706,141
Source: Federal Election Commission

==== Results ====
Democratic primary results
Party	Candidate	Votes	%
Democratic	Sarah Trone Garriott	54,662	100.0
Total votes		54,662	100.0

=== Libertarian primary ===
==== Disqualified ====
- Marco Battaglia, nominee for lieutenant governor in 2022 and attorney general in 2018

=== General election ===
==== Predictions ====
Source	Ranking	As of
The Cook Political Report	Lean D (flip)	October 9, 2026
Decision Desk HQ	Lean D (flip)	July 14, 2026
Inside Elections	Tilt D (flip)	October 1, 2026
Sabato's Crystal Ball	Lean D (flip)	October 20, 2026
Silver Bulletin	Likely D (flip)	August 20, 2026

==== Post-primary endorsements ====
Zach Nunn (R)

Executive branch officials

- Scott Bessent, secretary of the treasury (2025–present)
- Brooke Rollins, secretary of agriculture (2025–present)

U.S. senators

- Chuck Grassley, president pro tempore (2019–2021, 2025–present) from Iowa (1981–present)

Organizations

- U.S. Chamber of Commerce
Sarah Trone Garriott (D)

Executive branch officials

- Pete Buttigieg, former secretary of transportation (2021–2025)

Statewide officials

- Tim Walz, governor of Minnesota (2019–present)

Labor unions

- National Education Association

Organizations

- Giffords
- Human Rights Campaign

==== Fundraising ====
Campaign finance reports as of October 14, 2026
Candidate	Raised	Spent	Cash on hand
Zach Nunn (R)	$6,123,740	$5,555,815	$620,759
Sarah Trone Garriott (D)	$8,070,402	$6,916,812	$1,153,590
Source: Federal Election Commission

==== Polling ====
Poll source	Date(s) administered	Sample size	Margin of error	Zach Nunn (R)	Sarah Trone Garriott (D)	Undecided
Ragnar Research Partners (R) (Note: Poll commissioned by Conservatives For America, an organization linked to the Republican Study Committee)	March 12–14, 2026	400 (LV)	± 5.0%	48%	42%	10%

Hypothetical polling

Zach Nunn vs. Jennifer Konfrst

Poll source	Date(s) administered	Sample size	Margin of error	Zach Nunn (R)	Jennifer Konfrst (D)	Undecided
Public Policy Polling (D)	September 17–18, 2025	717 (RV)	–	44%	44%	12%

Generic Republican vs. generic Democrat

Poll source	Date(s) administered	Sample size	Margin of error	Generic Republican	Generic Democrat	Other	Undecided
Ragnar Research Partners (R)	March 12–14, 2026	400 (LV)	± 5.0%	44%	43%	–	13%
Change Research (D)	October 23–27, 2025	638 (LV)	± 4.3%	42%	45%	1% (Note: "Would not vote" with 1%)	12%

==== Results ====
2026 Iowa's 3rd congressional district election
Party	Candidate	Votes	%	±%
Democratic	Sarah Trone Garriott	189,435	53.6%	+5.6
Republican	Zach Nunn (incumbent)	163,687	46.6%	–5.2
Total votes		353,122	100.0	

== District 4 ==
2026 Iowa's 4th congressional district election
- Reporting: 98.7% as of 3:14 PM CST

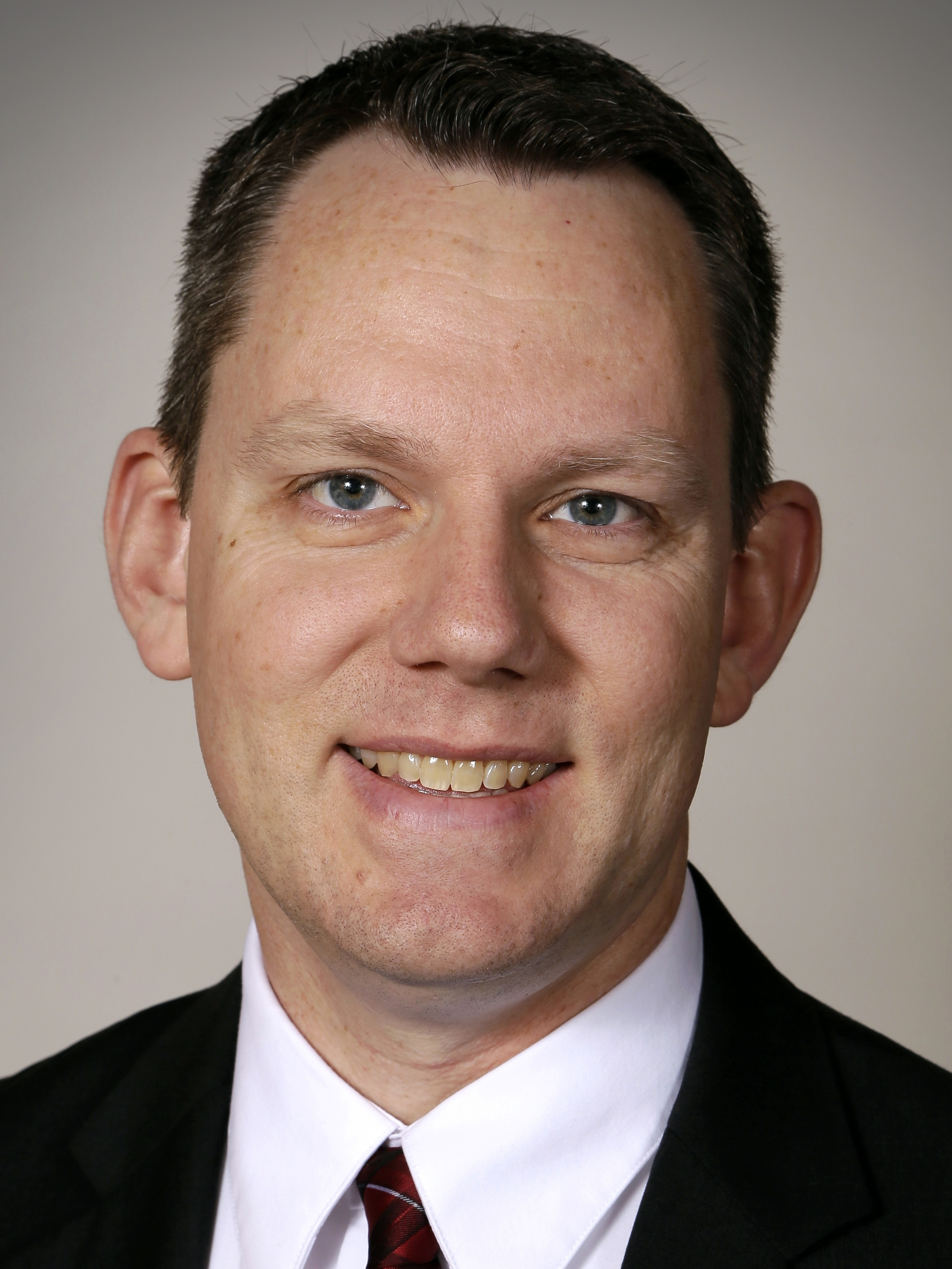
Nominee	Chris McGowan	Dave Dawson
Party	Republican	Democratic
Popular vote	178,959	124,128
Percentage	59.0%	41.0%
- McGowan: 50–60% 60–70% 70–80% 80–90% Dawson: 50–60% 60–70%
U.S. Representative before election
Randy Feenstra
Republican
Elected U.S. Representative
Chris McGowan
Republican

The 4th district is based in northwestern Iowa and includes the cities of Ames and Sioux City. The incumbent is Republican Randy Feenstra, who was re-elected with 67.0% of the vote in 2024.

On October 28, 2025, Feenstra announced he was retiring to run for governor in 2026. He placed 2nd in the Republican primary, losing by less than 1%.

=== Republican primary ===
==== Nominee ====
- Chris McGowan, president of the Siouxland Chamber of Commerce

==== Withdrawn ====
- Douglas Jensen, concrete company executive
- Kyle Larsen, farmer (endorsed McGowan)
- Ryan Rhodes, former senior strategist for the Ben Carson 2016 presidential campaign and former CEO of Parler (endorsed McGowan)
- Matt Windschitl, former majority leader of the Iowa House of Representatives (2020–2025) from the 15th district (2007–present) (endorsed McGowan)

==== Declined ====
- Lynn Evans, state senator from the 3rd district (2023–present) (running for re-election)
- Randy Feenstra, incumbent U.S. representative (ran for governor)
- Steven Holt, state representative from the 12th district (2015–present)
- Zach Nunn, U.S. representative from the 3rd district (ran for re-election)

==== Endorsements ====
Chris McGowan

Executive branch officials

- Terry Branstad, former ambassador to China (2017–2020) and former governor of Iowa (1983–1999, 2011–2017)
- Donald Trump, president of the United States (2017–2021, 2025–present)

U.S. senators

- Joni Ernst, Iowa (2015–present)

U.S. representatives

- Tom Emmer, House majority whip (2023–present) from MN-06 (2015–present)
- Mike Johnson, speaker of the House (2023–present) from LA-04 (2017–present)
- Jim Jordan, OH-04 (2007–present)
- Steve Scalise, House majority leader (2023–present) from LA-01 (2008–present)
- Rudy Yakym, IN-02 (2022–present)

State legislators

- Matt Windschitl, former majority leader of the Iowa House of Representatives (2020–2025) from HD-15 (2007–present) and former candidate for this seat

Individuals

- Robert O'Neill, former Navy SEAL
- Ryan Rhodes, former senior strategist for the Ben Carson 2016 presidential campaign, former CEO of Parler, and former candidate for this seat
Ryan Rhodes (withdrew)

Executive branch officials

- Ben Carson, former secretary of housing and urban development (2017–2021)

==== Fundraising ====
Italics indicate a withdrawn candidate.

Campaign finance reports as of May 13, 2026
Candidate	Raised	Spent	Cash on hand
Chris McGowan (R)	$636,623	$261,281	$375,342
Ryan Rhodes (R)	$435,006	$425,446	$9,560
Source: Federal Election Commission

==== Results ====
Republican primary results
Party	Candidate	Votes	%
Republican	Chris McGowan	55,077	100.0
Total votes		55,077	100.0

=== Democratic primary ===
==== Nominee ====
- David Dawson, former state representative from the 14th district (2013–2017)

==== Eliminated in primary ====
- Stephanie Steiner, nurse
- Ashley WolfTornabane, stay-at-home mom

==== Withdrawn ====
- Ryan Melton, Nationwide insurance supervisor and nominee for this district in 2022 and 2024

==== Fundraising ====
Campaign finance reports as of May 13, 2026
Candidate	Raised	Spent	Cash on hand
Dave Dawson (D)	$98,357	$61,895	$36,462
Ashley WolfTornabane (D)	$22,458	$14,043	$8,505
Source: Federal Election Commission

==== Results ====
Results by county: Dawson: 30–40%; 40–50%; 50–60%; Steiner: 30–40%; 40–50%; WolfTornabane: 30–40%; 40–50%; 60–70%

Democratic primary results
Party	Candidate	Votes	%
Democratic	David Dawson	11,291	39.1
Democratic	Stephanie Steiner	8,836	30.6
Democratic	Ashley WolfTornabane	8,782	30.4
Total votes		28,909	100.0

=== Independents ===
==== Filed paperwork ====
- Jermaine Decker, Army veteran

=== General election ===
==== Predictions ====
Source	Ranking	As of
The Cook Political Report	Solid R	February 6, 2025
Decision Desk HQ	Safe R	July 14, 2026
Inside Elections	Solid R	March 7, 2025
Sabato's Crystal Ball	Safe R	April 10, 2025
Silver Bulletin	Solid R	August 20, 2026

==== Post-primary endorsements ====
Dave Dawson (D)

Labor unions

- National Education Association

==== Fundraising ====
Campaign finance reports as of October 14, 2026
Candidate	Raised	Spent	Cash on hand
Chris McGowan (R)	$862,816	$418,901	$443,915
Dave Dawson (D)	$259,241	$217,264	$41,976
Source: Federal Election Commission

==== Debates ====
2026 United States House election in Iowa (District 4) debates
No.	Date	Host	Moderators	Link	Participants	
P Participant A Absent N Non-invitee I Invitee W Withdrawn						
P Participant A Absent N Non-invitee I Invitee W Withdrawn					Dave Dawson	Chris McGowan
1	October 14, 2026	Iowa PBS	Kay Henderson	Iowa PBS	P	P

==== Results ====
2026 Iowa's 4th congressional district election
Party	Candidate	Votes	%	±%
Republican	Chris McGowan	178,959	59.0%	–8.0
Democratic	Dave Dawson	124,128	41.0%	+8.3
Total votes		303,087	100.0	

== Notes ==
Partisan clients
