= Bill Anderson (Iowa politician) =

Republican politician and legislator

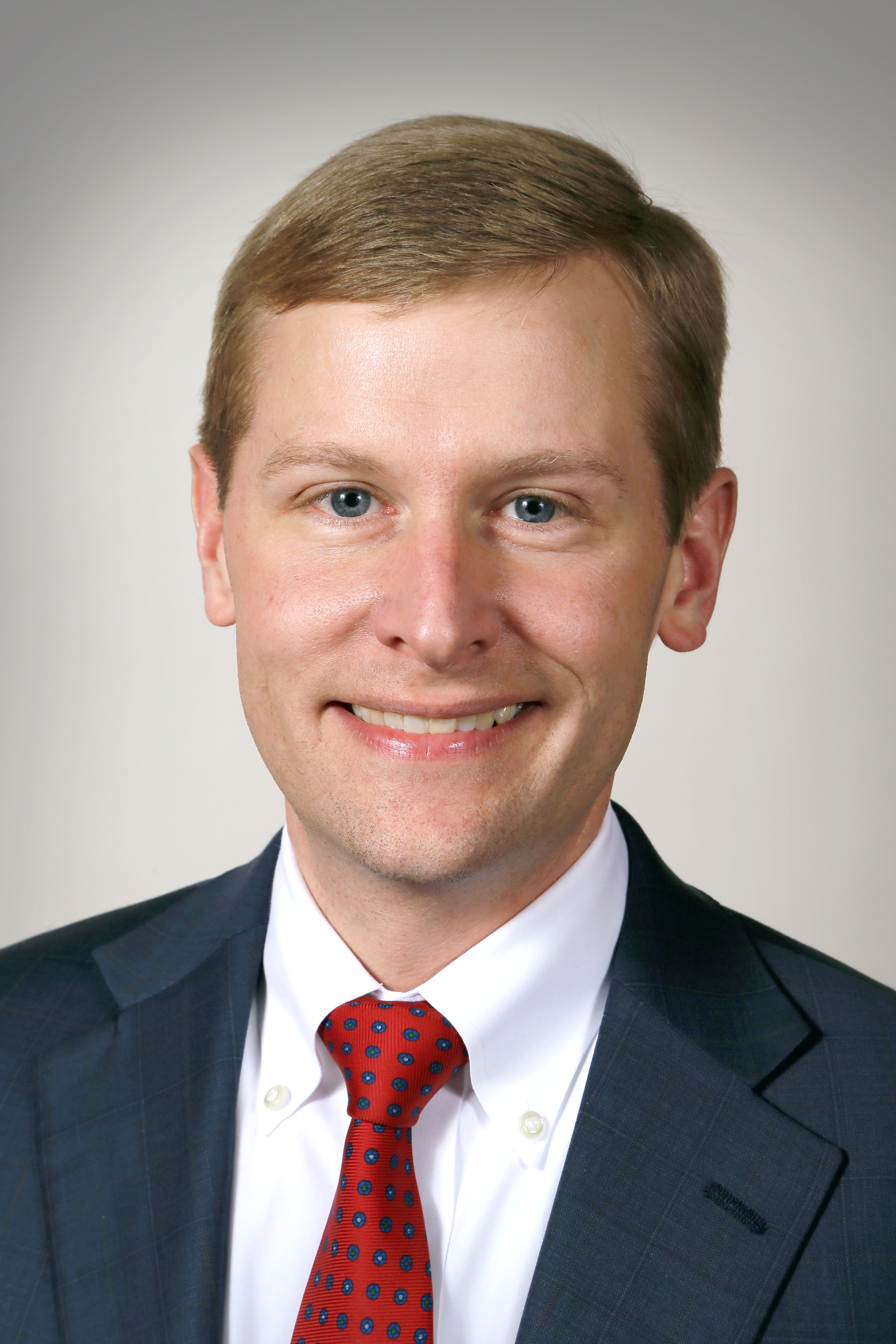

Member of the Iowa Senate from the 3rd district
- In office January 10, 2011 – November 1, 2017
- Preceded by: Ron Wieck
- Succeeded by: Jim Carlin

Personal details
- Born: 1977 (age 48–49) Sioux City, Iowa, U.S.
- Party: Republican
- Spouse: Angie
- Children: 1 son, 2 daughters
- Occupation: Small Business Owner, Congressional Assistant

Bill Anderson (born 1977) is a former Republican politician and legislator from the state of Iowa having served the 3rd district in the State Senate between 2011 and 2017.

== Political career ==
Anderson served on the staff of Senator Chuck Grassley from 1999–2007. Currently he serves as the Military Academy Coordinator and Policy Adviser to Congressman Steve King. He served for three terms on the Iowa Republican State Central Committee. He was first elected to the Iowa Senate in 2010.

Anderson served as the Ranking Member of the Commerce Committee. His other committee assignments included State Government, Labor and Business, and the Transportation, Infrastructure and Capital Budget Sub Committee. In 2017, he resigned from the Iowa Senate to become executive director of the Cherokee Area Economic Development Corp.

== Education ==
Anderson graduated from North High School in Sioux City.

== Personal information ==
Anderson was born and raised in Sioux City, Iowa. Anderson and his wife, Angie, have a son and two daughters. The couple reside in Cherokee, Iowa.
