= Bruce Rastetter =

American businessman & entrepreneur

Bruce L. Rastetter (born 1957) is an American agribusinessman and agricultural entrepreneur. He founded Heartland Pork Enterprises, and started and sold 80% of Hawkeye Energy Holdings, one of the largest US ethanol producers. He started "Summit Agriculture Group", which is in the business of carbon capture and storage for Iowa ethanol plants.

Rastetter is a well known megadonor to the Republican Party and has been called an "Iowa kingmaker". He has been an agricultural adviser to Donald Trump. He was a former president of the Iowa Board of Regents from 2013 to 2017, which governs Iowa's three public universities.

== Early life and education ==
Rastetter was born near Iowa Falls, Iowa in 1957. He has three brothers and a sister. His younger brother is Brent Rastetter. He grew up on a small farm near Buckeye, Iowa where his parents, Harley and LaVon, "lived modestly, with few luxuries".

He attended the University of Iowa, studying political science.

== Career ==
=== Business ===
In 1994, three years after founding his first company, Rastetter consolidated his feed management, construction, and swine projects into Heartland Pork Enterprises. Heartland suffered multimillion-dollar losses and was sold to Christensen Farms in 2004.

In 2003, Rastetter created Hawkeye Energy Holdings, one of the nation's largest pure-play ethanol producers starting with an ethanol plant in Iowa Falls, then one in Fairbank, in Menlo and Shell Rock. In 2010, the latter two were sold to Flint Hills Resources by the Koch brothers.

Rastetter founded Summit Agriculture Group, which has farming operations in the U.S., and plans for an ethanol plant in Brazil. He also founded Summit Carbon Solutions, a company to build a pipeline from Iowa ethanol plants to carry carbon to underground storage in fracking sites in North Dakota. State legislators have said that Rastetter donated to Governor Kim Reynolds’ campaigns and that "she will not act on [land owner concerns] until the pipeline is through."

In June 2024, the Iowa Utilities Board approved the permit.

=== Politics ===
Rastetter is a well-known megadonor to the Republican party, having donated more than $1.5 million to state and federal political campaigns from 2003 to 2015 alone and has been called an "Iowa kingmaker". In 2015, Rastetter announced the inaugural Iowa Agriculture Summit to address the political initiatives and interests of farmers and agriculture in the state, such as GMO's, nutrition labeling, food waste, and biotechnology. Mike Huckabee, Chris Christie, Donald Trump, Ted Cruz, Rick Santorum, Scott Walker, and Jeb Bush attended the event, located within the Iowa State Fairgrounds.

Rastetter first became involved with the Iowa Board of Regents in 2011, becoming its president in 2013. His term expired in 2017. Controversially, he wanted to build large farms in Tanzania with 3 of his companies on already populated land and tried to influence Iowa State University through his position on the Board of Regents to become involved in the project for example by perform studies beneficial to his companies. The project fell through.

As of 2017, he served on governing and advisory boards of a variety of organizations, including Cultivation Corridor, AltEnergy LLC, Rural American Fund, American Agriculture and Energy Council, Iowa Renewable Fuels Association, and the college of agriculture at Iowa State University.

In January 2017, shortly before the White House transition, Rastetter voiced his opposition to pending mega-mergers in the agriculture industry, such as those concerning Bayer, Monsanto, Dow Chemical, ChemChina, and Syngenta. The agricultural adviser to Donald Trump stated, "Mergers like this have the potential to put into motion irreversible damage to agriculture."

== Personal life ==
Rastetter never married, which he regrets. He likes hunting.

Rastetter funded an endowed faculty position, the Bruce Rastetter Chair in Agricultural Entrepreneurship at Iowa State University. He has donated to the University of Iowa and University of Northern Iowa. The Bruce Rastetter exhibit building at the Iowa State Fair is named after him after a $1 million contribution. In 2008, he gave $5 million to upgrade training facilities for Hawkeye football.

== See also ==
- Harry Stine
- Iowa Board of Regents
- Dennis Keeney
- Landgrabbing
- Cowboys do Cerrado
