= Chris McGowan =

American politician (born 1966)

Member-elect of the U.S. House of Representatives from Iowa's 4th district
- Assuming office January 3, 2027
- Succeeding: Randy Feenstra

Personal details
- Born: December 1966 (age 59) Sioux City, Iowa, U.S.
- Party: Republican
- Education: St. John's University (BS); Ave Maria School of Law (JD)
- Website: Campaign website

Chris John McGowan (born December 1966) is an American politician and businessman who has served as the president of the Siouxland Chamber of Commerce since 2011. He is the member-elect for Iowa's 4th congressional district in the United States House of Representatives.

== Early life ==
McGowan was born in December 1966 in Sioux City, Iowa.

== Biography ==
McGowan has served as president of the Siouxland Chamber of Commerce since 2011.

In 2025, he announced his campaign for Iowa's 4th congressional district in the 2026 cycle. He gained endorsements from Jim Jordan, Steve Scalise, Tom Emmer, and Donald Trump, and outpaced the primary field in fundraising. He was set to Matt Windschitl and other candidates in the primary, but ultimately had no opponents.

His biography was published in The Almanac of American Politics as part of the first-ever publication series of candidates who won their party's nomination in seats safe for their party.

U.S. House of Representatives
Preceded by Randy Feenstra	Member of the U.S. House of Representatives from Iowa's 4th congressional district Taking office 2027	Elect
