= List of people from Davenport, Iowa =

The following list includes notable people who were born or have lived in Davenport, Iowa.

== Fine arts and music ==
Edward M. Catich, Artist, Writer, Priest, founded St. Ambrose Art Department, wrote "The Origin Of The Serif".

- Bix Beiderbecke, jazz musician; the Bix 7 Road Race and Memorial Jazz Festival are named for him
- Isabel Bloom, sculpture artist; raised in Davenport
- Branden Campbell, bassist for Neon Trees; born in Davenport
- Julia Michaels, singer-songwriter; born in Davenport
- Helen Vanni, opera singer; born in Davenport
- Dave Blunts, rapper; from Davenport

== Media ==
- Anania, internet personality
- Matthew Ashford, actor (Jack Deveraux on Days of Our Lives)
- Lara Flynn Boyle, actress (Twin Peaks and The Practice)
- Louise Carver, silent film and stage actress
- Dana Davis, actress (Franklin & Bash and 10 Things I Hate About You)
- Joe Frisco, jazz dancer and performer in vaudeville
- John Getz, stage and film actor (Blood Simple, Zodiac)
- Hazel Keener, silent-film actress
- Perry Lafferty, executive TV producer (All in the Family, M*A*S*H, and The Mary Tyler Moore Show)
- Sue Lyon, actress (Lolita)
- Stuart Margolin, actor and director (The Rockford Files)
- Vanessa McNeal, activist
- Mary Beth Peil, actress and singer (The Good Wife)
- Roger Perry, actor (Harrigan and Son)
- James Philbrook, actor (The Thin Red Line)
- Linnea Quigley, actress, known as a B movie scream queen
- Robin Thede, comedian, writer and actress; lived here as a child; first African-American woman host of a late-night TV talk show, The Rundown
- Hynden Walch, voice actress

== Politics ==
- Ken Croken, Iowa state representative since 2023
- Lyda Krewson, Mayor of St. Louis, Missouri
- Jim Leach, U.S. congressman; chairperson of National Endowment for the Humanities
- Larry Leonard, Illinois state senator
- Mariannette Miller-Meeks, U.S. congresswoman; former state senator and Director of the Iowa Department of Public Health
- Hiram Price, U.S. congressman
- Phyllis Thede, Iowa state representative from 2009 to 2023
- Anthony Van Wyck, Wisconsin state senator
- Mike Vondran, Iowa state representative since 2023
- Jarvis White, Wisconsin state assemblyman

== Professional ==
=== Frederick G. Clausen, architect ===
- Samuel Cody, aviation pioneer; native of Davenport
- Edward Hammatt, architect
- Daniel David Palmer, founder of chiropractic and the Palmer College of Chiropractic
- Oran Pape, first Iowa state patrolman murdered in the line of duty
- Otto Frederick Rohwedder, inventor of mass-produced sliced bread; grew up in Davenport
- James A. Skinner, Executive Chairman of Walgreens Boots Alliance, and former CEO and Vice President of McDonald's; graduated from West High School (1962)

== Religion ==
- Ambrose Burke, priest and eighth president of Saint Ambrose University
- Martin Cone, priest and sixth president of Saint Ambrose University
- John Flannagan, priest and second president of Saint Ambrose University
- Mary Porter Gamewell (1848-1906), American missionary to China
- Gail Karp, cantor of Temple Emanuel
- Cletus Madsen, priest
- Carl Meinberg, priest and seventh president of Saint Ambrose University
- Sebastian Menke, priest and tenth president of Saint Ambrose University
- Marvin Mottet, priest
- Gerald Francis O'Keefe, bishop of the Diocese of Davenport

== Sports ==
- Gene Baker, infielder for Chicago Cubs and Pittsburgh Pirates
- Mike Busch, infielder for Los Angeles Dodgers
- Mike Butcher, pitcher for California Angels, coach for Arizona Diamondbacks
- Ed Conroy, college basketball head coach
- Roger Craig, running back for San Francisco 49ers, Los Angeles Raiders, and Minnesota Vikings
- Ricky Davis, basketball shooting guard for multiple NBA teams
- Justin Diercks, driver with NASCAR
- Greg Engel, center for San Diego Chargers and Detroit Lions
- Bill Fennelly, head women's basketball coach at Iowa State University
- Bill Fitch, two-time NBA Coach of the Year
- Dana Holgorsen, head coach of the University of Houston football team
- Austin Howard, offensive tackle for Oakland Raiders
- James Jones, defensive tackle for multiple NFL teams
- Josh Kroeger, outfielder for Arizona Diamondbacks
- Elmer Layden, fullback for three NFL teams, Notre Dame coach, College Football Hall of Famer
- Colby Lopez, professional wrestler known as Seth "Freakin'" Rollins in WWE
- Pat Miletich, mixed martial artist, inaugural UFC welterweight champion
- Michael Nunn, middleweight boxing champion; born in Davenport
- Nat Pendleton, Olympic wrestler (silver medalist); actor
- Scott Pose, outfielder for Florida Marlins, New York Yankees, and Kansas City Royals
- Rebecca Quin, professional wrestler known as Becky Lynch in WWE
- Kenny Shedd, wide receiver for multiple NFL teams, including Oakland Raiders
- Bob Stull, football head coach, University of Missouri and UTEP Miners football

== Writing ==
- Alice Braunlich (1888–1989), classical philologist; taught at Shimer and Goucher colleges
- George Cram Cook, novelist, poet, and playwright
- Lillien Blanche Fearing (1863–1901), American lawyer and poet
- Susan Glaspell, writer, Pulitzer Prize-winning playwright
- Maria Purdy Peck (1840-1914), essayist, social economist, civic leader
- Charles Edward Russell (1860–1941), muckraking journalist; co-founder of the NAACP; 1927 Pulitzer Prize winner
