= Iowa's 82nd House of Representatives district =

American legislative district

House District 82
- Type: District of the Lower house
- Location: Iowa
- Representative: Bobby Kaufmann
- Parent organization: Iowa General Assembly
- Affiliations: Republican

The 82nd District of the Iowa House of Representatives in the state of Iowa is composed of Cedar County and part of Muscatine and Scott Counties.

== Current elected officials ==
Bobby Kaufmann is the representative currently representing the district.

== Past representatives ==
The district has previously been represented by:

- Lillian McElroy, 1971–1973
- Thomas Higgins, 1973–1977
- Robert Arnould, 1977–1983
- Dorothy Carpenter, 1983–1993
- Joan Hester, 1993–1995
- Donna Barry, 1995–2001
- Paul Wilderdyke, 2001–2003
- Joe Hutter, 2003–2007
- Linda Miller, 2007–2013
- Curt Hanson, 2013–2017
- Phil Miller, 2017–2019
- Jeff Shipley, 2019–2023
- Bobby Kaufmann, 2023–present
