= Daniel Jay =

American politician

Daniel J. Jay

Member of the Iowa House of Representatives from the 66th district 93rd (1979-1983)
- In office January 8, 1979 – January 10, 1993
- Preceded by: John Brunow
- Succeeded by: Dennis Renaud

Personal details
- Born: May 13, 1954 (age 72) Centerville, Iowa, United States
- Party: Democratic
- Spouse: Julie Jensen
- Children: 3
- Education: Drake University (J.D.)

Daniel Jay (born May 13, 1954) is a former American politician from the state of Iowa.

Jay was born in Centerville, Iowa in 1954. He graduated from Moulton-Udell Community School, (valedictorian) 1972; B.A., Drake University, (magna cum laude) 1975; J.D, Drake University Law School, 1979. He is married with three children and several grandchildren.

Iowa House of Representatives
Preceded by John Brunow	93rd district 1979–1983	Succeeded by Bill Royer
Preceded by Dorothy Carpenter	66th district 1983–1993	Succeeded by Dennis Renaud
