= Jeff Shipley =

American politician

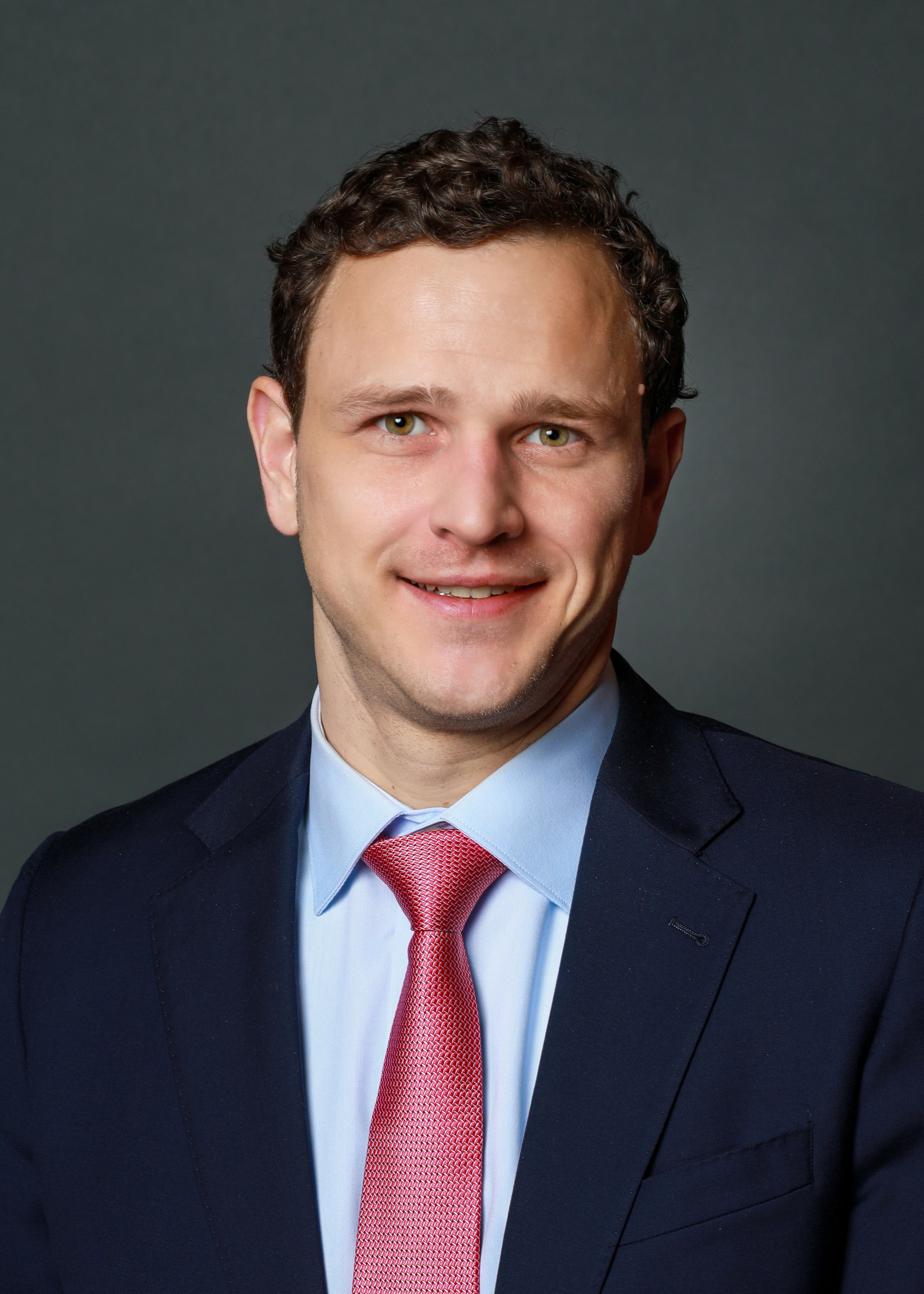

Member of the Iowa House of Representatives from the 87th district
- Incumbent
- Assumed office January 14, 2019
- Preceded by: Phil Miller

Personal details
- Born: August 9, 1988 (age 38) Euclid, Ohio, U.S.
- Party: Republican
- Education: University of Iowa (B.A.)

Jeff Shipley (born August 9, 1988) is an American politician from the state of Iowa currently serving in the Iowa House of Representatives as the representative of District 87.

== Early life and education ==
Shipley was born in Euclid, Ohio, in 1988 and was raised in Naperville, Illinois, where he graduated from high school. He received his B.A. in political science from the University of Iowa in 2010. Since 2011, he has been a resident of Fairfield, Iowa.

In 2012, Shipley was arrested and charged with possession of a controlled substance and carrying a concealed weapon without a permit. After pleading guilty, he was sentenced to probation. The convictions were later expunged.

== Political career ==
In 2019, Shipley called a California state senator a "medical rapist" on X (formerly Twitter) for their pro-vaccine views. After apologizing, Shipley suggested "pharma fascist" or "corporate vaccine whore" were more appropriate terms.

In June 2020, during the COVID-19 pandemic, Shipley claimed that it "wasn't even killing anybody", a claim he later walked back as the state has recorded several hundred deaths. Later that year, he stated young people had a greater chance of being killed by the HPV vaccine than COVID-19, a claim rated "Pants on Fire" by PolitiFact.

In 2022, Shipley proposed an amendment blocking pay raises for teachers that teach "divisive content" which was characterized by critics as a "ban on American history that Republicans don’t agree with", though the amendment ultimately did not succeed.

In late January 2024, Shipley proposed a bill to remove gender identity protections from Iowa civil rights law and classify gender dysphoria as a disability. The bill was eventually rejected on January 31. Shipley previously compared affirming transgender identity or gender dysphoria to affirming a sarcoma, saying "a sarcoma would be treated with aggressive therapies to remove or heal the cancerous growth and that same medical framework should be applied to the epidemic of identity disorders".

In February 2024, Shipley was the subject of an ethics complaint after telling the founder of a nonprofit that opposes book bans that she was breaking the law by giving obscene material to children. The complaint was later dismissed by the Iowa House Ethics Committee.

In November 2024, Shipley won reelection 58% to 40% over challenger Tom O'Donnell.

In March 2026, Shipley was confronted by a Cedar Falls resident about a bill which made Ivermectin available over the counter. In response, Shipley called the resident a "r*tarded f*ggot". After facing backlash from this incident, Shipley apologized to the resident, stating "I'm sorry for calling you a name, but in my defense you were being super condescending and antagonistic."

In July 2026, Shipley was found guilty of speeding and failing to use a child restraint device after officers found his child unrestrained in the backseat. Charges were upheld on appeal.

Shipley narrowly won reelection in 2026, 51% to 49% over challenger Tom O'Donnell, in a rematch of their 2024 contest.

In November 2026, the bipartisan Iowa Ethics and Campaign Disclosure Board voted unanimously to open a formal investigation into a complaint involving Shipley campaign spending on a pesticide research study. Shipley stated that the project is on the cutting edge of scientific research and that the complaint was "totally frivolous and [the] result of some random idiot using AI tools to harass public servants."

As a member of the Iowa House, Shipley serves as the vice chair for the Government Oversight and Higher Education Committees.

== Electoral history ==
=== 2014 ===
Election	Political result	Candidate	Party	Votes	%
Iowa House general election, 2014; District 82	Democratic	Curt Hanson (I)	Democratic	5,885	51.7
Iowa House general election, 2014; District 82	Democratic	Jeff Shipley	Republican	5,487	48.3

=== 2018 ===
Election	Political result	Candidate	Party	Votes	%
Iowa House general election, 2018; District 82	Republican	Jeff Shipley	Republican	6,120	50.1
Iowa House general election, 2018; District 82	Republican	Phil Miller (I)	Democratic	6,083	49.8

=== 2020 ===
Election	Political result	Candidate	Party	Votes	%
Iowa House general election, 2020; District 82	Republican	Jeff Shipley (I)	Republican	7,770	50.47
Iowa House general election, 2020; District 82	Republican	Phil Miller	Democratic	7,604	49.36

=== 2022 ===
Election	Political result	Candidate	Party	Votes	%
Iowa House primary elections, 2022; District 87	Republican	Jeff Shipley	Republican	1,605	54.80
Iowa House primary elections, 2022; District 87	Republican	Joe Mitchell	Republican	1,319	45.03
Iowa House primary elections, 2022; District 87	Republican	Write-ins	Republican	5	0.17
Iowa House general election, 2022; District 87	Republican	Jeff Shipley	Republican	6,439	55.45
Iowa House general election, 2022; District 87	Republican	Mike Heaton	Democratic	5,154	44.39
Iowa House general election, 2022; District 87	Republican	Write-ins		19	0.16

Iowa House of Representatives
Preceded by Dennis Cohoon	87th district 2023-Present	Succeeded by Incumbent
Preceded by Phil Miller	82nd district 2019–2023	Succeeded by Bobby Kaufmann
