= Iowa's 97th House of Representatives district =

American legislative district

House District 97
- Type: District of the Lower house
- Location: Iowa
- Representative: Ken Croken
- Parent organization: Iowa General Assembly

The 97th District of the Iowa House of Representatives in the state of Iowa. It is currently composed of part of Scott County.

== Current elected officials ==
Ken Croken is the representative currently representing the district.

== Past representatives ==
The district has previously been represented by:

- John L. Bascom, 1907–1913
- James H. Schwartz, 1971–1973
- Lillian McElroy, 1973–1977
- William H. Harbor, 1977–1983
- Wendell C. Pellett, 1983–1991
- Richard B. Weidman, 1991–1993
- Gregory A. Spenner, 1993–1995
- Dave Heaton, 1995–2003
- Effie Boggess, 2003–2005
- Rich Anderson, 2005–2013
- Steven Olson, 2013–2015
- Norlin Mommsen, 2015–2023
- Ken Croken, 2023–2027
- Adam Peters, 2027
