= Larry Disney =

American politician (born 1953)

Member of the Iowa House of Representatives from the 66th district
- In office January 9, 1995 – January 12, 1997
- Preceded by: Dennis Renaud
- Succeeded by: Geri Huser

Personal details
- Born: August 10, 1953 (age 72) Baltimore, Maryland, U.S.
- Party: Republican
- Spouse: Debra (m. 1975)
- Education: Iowa State University (BA); Southern Illinois University (MBA)
- Occupation: Politician

Military service
- Allegiance: United States
- Branch/service: United States Navy
- Years of service: 1976–1986
- Rank: Commander

Larry Disney (born August 10, 1953) is an American former politician.

Disney was born in Baltimore on August 10, 1953, to parents James and Wilma Disney, and raised in Iowa. After graduating from Southeast Polk High School in 1972, Disney earned a Bachelor of Arts degree in political science at Iowa State University, followed by a Master of Business Administration from Southern Illinois University in 1984.

Disney served as an active duty naval flight officer in the United States Navy between 1976 and 1986, and began reserve duty the following year, with the rank of commander. He was a member of the Iowa House of Representatives from January 9, 1995, to January 12, 1997, holding the District 66 seat as a Republican.
