= John Brunow =

American politician

John B. Brunow

Member of the Iowa House of Representatives from the 93rd district
- In office January 8, 1973 – January 7, 1979
- Preceded by: James Middleswart
- Succeeded by: Daniel Jay

Personal details
- Born: October 14, 1949 (age 76) Centerville, Iowa, United States
- Party: Democratic
- Spouse: Celia Melson
- Children: Jessica Brunow
- Education: University of Iowa

John B. Brunow (born October 14, 1949) is a former American politician from the state of Iowa.

Brunow was born in Centerville, Iowa in 1949. He graduated from Centerville Community High School in 1967 and attended the University of Iowa from 1967 through 1971.

Iowa House of Representatives
Preceded by James Middleswart	93rd district 1973–1979	Succeeded by Daniel Jay
