= Fearing =

Fearing is a surname. Notable people with the surname include:

- Dean Fearing (born 1955), American chef
- Kenneth Fearing (1902–1961), American poet and writer
- Lillien Blanche Fearing (1863–1901), American lawyer and poet
- Maria Fearing (1838–1937), Bible translator
- Paul Fearing (1762–1822), American politician
- Benjamin Dana Fearing (1837–1881) Grandson of Paul Fearing and American military officer of the American Civil War
- Stephen Fearing (born 1963), Canadian folk singer-songwriter

Fictional characters:

- Patricia Fearing, a James Bond character

== See also ==
- Fearing Pond
- Fearing Township, Washington County, Ohio, United States
- Fear (disambiguation)
