= Galen Davis =

American politician (1951–2005)

Member of the Iowa House of Representatives from the 93rd district
- In office January 11, 1999 – January 7, 2001
- Preceded by: Michael Moreland
- Succeeded by: Mark Tremmel

Personal details
- Born: Galen M. Davis; February 6, 1951 Ottumwa, Iowa, U.S.
- Died: February 7, 2005 (aged 54)
- Party: Republican
- Spouse: Pamala
- Children: 2
- Occupation: Politician, police officer

Galen M. Davis (February 6, 1951 – February 7, 2005) was an American police officer and politician.

Davis was a native of Ottumwa, Iowa, born on February 6, 1951. He worked for the Ottumwa Police Department for three decades, and was promoted to sergeant in 1987. He was active in several law enforcement organizations, and was a member of civic and political organizations at the county level. Davis was a Republican, and served a single term in the Iowa House of Representatives from District 93 between 1999 and 2001. He died on February 7, 2005, aged 54.
