= Dorothy Carpenter =

American politician (1933–2011)

Dorothy F. Carpenter

Member of the Iowa House of Representatives from the 74th district
- In office January 11, 1993 – January 8, 1995
- Preceded by: Johnie Hammond
- Succeeded by: Libby Jacobs

Member of the Iowa House of Representatives from the 82nd district
- In office January 10, 1983 – January 10, 1993
- Preceded by: Robert Arnould
- Succeeded by: Joan Hester

Member of the Iowa House of Representatives from the 66th district
- In office January 12, 1981 – January 9, 1983
- Preceded by: Patricia Thompson-Woodworth
- Succeeded by: Daniel Jay

Personal details
- Born: March 13, 1933 Ismay, Montana, U.S.
- Died: April 2, 2011 (aged 78)
- Party: Democratic (2006–2011) Republican (until 2006)
- Education: Grinnell College

Dorothy F. Carpenter (née Fulton; March 13, 1933 – April 2, 2011) was an American politician. She was a Republican member of the Iowa House of Representatives from 1980 to 1994.

== Early life ==
Carpenter was born on March 13, 1933, in Ismay, Montana. Her parents were Daniel A. Fulton and Mary Ann Fulton (née George). She grew up on a ranch assisting her father. She attended Custer County High School in Miles City, Montana, where she graduated in 1951. She received a bachelor's of arts degree in history from Grinnell College in Grinnell, Iowa, in 1955. While at the college, she met Thomas Ward Carpenter whom she married the same year. The couple moved to Houston, Texas, where Carpenter taught elementary school from 1955 to 1957 while her husband was in the military. They moved to Iowa City, Iowa, in 1958 while Tom attended law school and then to West Des Moines. They had two children: Mary Ione and James Thonas.

Carpenter was active in the community, serving as a member of St. Timothy’s Episcopal Church, the League of Women Voters of Metro Des Moines, Common Cause, Planned Parenthood of Iowa, and the Iowa Women's Political Caucus of the National Organization for Women (NOW). She also joined the West Des Moines Human Rights Commission and the Terrace Hill Society Board. She was on the board of directors for the Planned Parenthood Federation of America from 1977 to 1980.

== Political career ==
Carpenter was first elected as a representative of the Iowa House of Representatives in 1980. She was a Republican representing the 66th district. She was re-elected in 1983 as the representative for the 82nd district and again in 1993 as the representative for the 74th district. She served for 14 years, retiring from politics in 1994. She was appointed as the assistant minority floor leader from 1980 to 1988. She was a member of the Ways and Means, State Government, Education and House Administration and Rule committees and chair of the State Government and Ethics Committee from 1992 to 1994.

== Later life ==
In 2006, Carpenter changed her party affiliation from Republican to Democrat due to differing views on abortion. She died on April 2, 2011, at the age of 78.
