= Joan Hester =

American politician (1932–2019)

Member of the Iowa House of Representatives from the 82nd district
- In office January 11, 1993 – January 8, 1995
- Preceded by: Dorothy Carpenter
- Succeeded by: Donna Barry

Member of the Iowa House of Representatives from the 98th district
- In office January 14, 1985 – January 10, 1993
- Preceded by: Laverne Schroeder
- Succeeded by: Philip Wise

Personal details
- Born: November 20, 1932 Persia, Iowa, United States
- Died: November 19, 2019 (aged 86) Honey Creek, Pottawattamie County, Iowa
- Party: Republican
- Spouse: Jack W. Hester
- Children: six
- Occupation: homemaker

Joan L. Hester (née Goshorn; November 20, 1932 – November 19, 2019) was an American politician in the state of Iowa. Hester was born in Persia, Iowa. She was married to Jack W. Hester, who served in the Iowa State Senate. A Republican, she served in the Iowa House of Representatives from 1985 to 1995 (98th district from 1985 to 1993 and 82nd district from 1993 to 1995).

She died on November 19, 2019, in Honey Creek, Pottawattamie County, Iowa at age 86.
