= Cedar Falls =

Cedar Falls may refer to:

- Operation Cedar Falls, ground operation of the Vietnam War
- Cedar Falls, Iowa
  - Cedar Falls Utilities in Cedar Falls, Iowa
  - Cedar Falls Community School District in Cedar Falls, Iowa
  - Cedar Falls Historical Society in Cedar Falls, Iowa
  - Cedar Falls High School in Cedar Falls, Iowa
  - Cedar Falls Ice House in Cedar Falls, Iowa
  - Cedar Falls Independent Order of Odd Fellows Temple in Cedar Falls, Iowa
- Cedar Falls Township, Black Hawk County, Iowa
- Waterloo – Cedar Falls metropolitan area, Iowa
- Cedar Falls, North Carolina
- Cedar Rock Falls, North Carolina
- Cedar Falls, Washington
  - Cedar Falls Historic District in Washington
- Cedar Falls, Wisconsin
- Cedar Falls, a waterfall in Montana
- Cedar Falls, a waterfall in the Hocking Hills State Park, Ohio
