= Donald Lippold =

American politician (1915–1994)

Member of the Iowa House of Representatives from the 35th district
- In office January 8, 1973 – January 12, 1975
- Preceded by: Harold O. Fischer
- Succeeded by: Diane Brandt

Member of the Iowa House of Representatives from the 66th district
- In office January 13, 1969 – January 10, 1971
- Succeeded by: George Kinley

Personal details
- Born: January 22, 1915 Oswego, Illinois, U.S.
- Died: May 30, 1994 (aged 79)
- Party: Republican
- Spouse: Helen Ericksen (m. 1951)
- Children: 4
- Education: Oswego High School; Aurora College; Stout State University (BS, MS)
- Occupation: Politician

Military service
- Allegiance: United States
- Battles/wars: World War II

Donald L. Lippold (January 22, 1915 – May 30, 1994) was an American politician who served two non-consecutive terms in the Iowa House of Representatives.

Donald Lippold was born to parents Theodore and Mabel Lippold of Oswego, Illinois, on January 22, 1915. Lippold graduated from Oswego High School in his hometown in 1933 and attended Aurora College before completing his bachelor's degree at Stout State University in 1947, followed by a master's degree in 1948.

Lippold was the director of adult education for Waterloo Public Schools in Iowa. His wife, Helen Ericksen, was an active member of the faculty wives of Waterloo Public Schools organization.

Lippold served his first term in the Iowa House of Representatives as a Republican legislator for District 66 from January 13, 1969 to January 10, 1971, and returned to the state house between January 8, 1973 and January 12, 1975, representing District 35. During his legislative career, Lippold continued to be an advocate for education. During the 1980 United States election cycle, Lippold co-signed a statement in support of lowering taxes.
