= Iowa's 93rd House of Representatives district =

American legislative district

House District 93
- Type: District of the Lower house
- Location: Iowa
- Representative: Gary Mohr
- Parent organization: Iowa General Assembly

The 93rd District of the Iowa House of Representatives in the state of Iowa is part of Scott County.

== Current elected officials ==
Gary Mohr is the representative currently representing the district.

== Past representatives ==
The district has previously been represented by:

- Allert Olson, 1945–1953
- James Middleswart, 1971–1973
- John Brunow, 1973–1979
- Daniel Jay, 1979–1983
- Bill Royer, 1983–1993
- Michael Moreland, 1993–1999
- Galen Davis, 1999–2001
- Mark Tremmel, 2001–2003
- Mary Gaskill, 2003–2013
- Phyllis Thede, 2013–2017
- Gary Mohr, 2017–present
