= Cherielynn Westrich =

American musician and politician

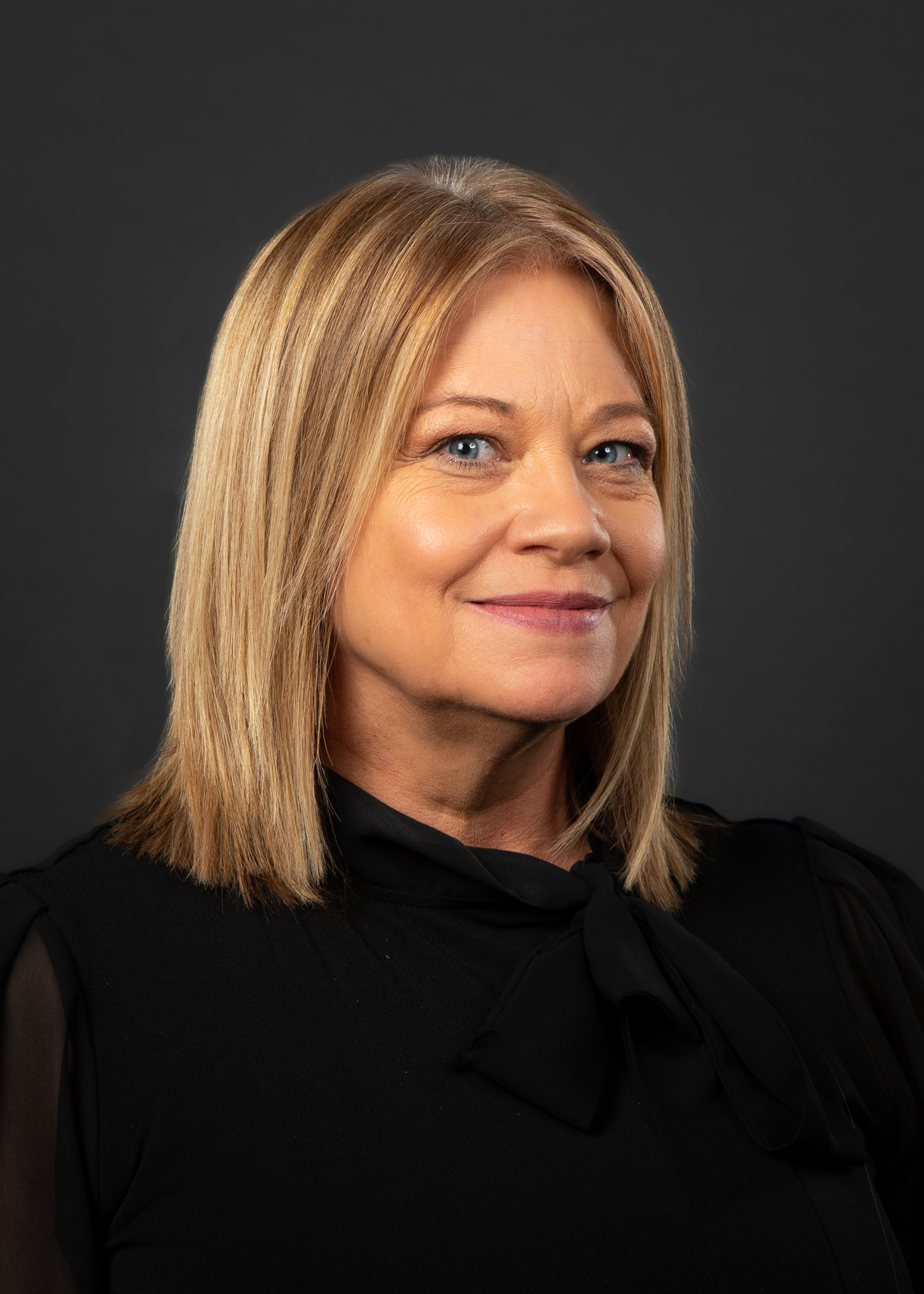

Member of the Iowa Senate from the 13th district
- Incumbent
- Assumed office January 9, 2023
- Preceded by: Julian Garrett

Member of the Iowa House of Representatives from the 81st district
- In office January 11, 2021 – January 8, 2023
- Preceded by: Mary Gaskill
- Succeeded by: Luana Stoltenberg

Personal details
- Born: Cherielynn Marie Westrich; January 21, 1966 (age 60) Missouri, U.S.
- Party: Republican
- Occupation: singer, politician
- Musical career
- Origin: Santa Monica, California
- Genres: Power Pop; Alternative Rock
- Instruments: vocals
- Years active: 1994-present
- Label: Maverick Records
- Formerly of: The Rentals

Cherielynn Westrich (born January 21, 1966) is an American musician and politician best known as an founding member of the power pop band The Rentals and contributing to their biggest hit "Friends of P."

Westrich was born in Missouri in 1966. She resides in Ottumwa, Iowa.

== Career ==
Prior to politics, Westrich had been involved in the music industry as a vocalist and keyboardist for The Rentals, as a vocalist and bassist for Supersport 2000, and also as the singer for The Slow Signal Fade.

Westrich has appeared on the television program Overhaulin', where she's worked on cars. She owns MalWood USA LLC, a manufacturer of hydraulic clutch pedals in Ottumwa, Iowa.

Westrich announced her candidacy for the vacant senate seat in District 13 following the passage of the (second) redistricting map in October 2021.

== Electoral history ==
*incumbent

=== 2018 ===
Election	Political result	Candidate	Party	Votes	%
Iowa House primary elections, 2018; District 81	Republican	Cherielynn Westrich	Republican	530	99
Iowa House primary elections, 2018; District 81	Republican	Write-ins	Republican	4	1
Iowa House general election, 2018; District 81	Democratic	Mary Gaskill*	Democratic	5,372	54.4
Iowa House general election, 2018; District 81	Democratic	Cherielynn Westrich	Republican	4,501	45.5
Iowa House general election, 2018; District 81	Democratic	Write-ins		9	0.1

=== 2020 ===
Election	Political result	Candidate	Party	Votes	%
Iowa House primary elections, 2020; District 81	Republican	Cherielynn Westrich	Republican	1,207	98.9
Iowa House primary elections, 2020; District 81	Republican	Write-ins	Republican	14	1.1
Iowa House general election, 2020; District 81	Republican	Cherielynn Westrich	Republican	6,684	53.05
Iowa House general election, 2020; District 81	Republican	Mary Gaskill*	Democratic	5,894	46.78
Iowa House general election, 2020; District 81	Republican	Write-ins		22	0.17

=== 2022 ===
Election	Political result	Candidate	Party	Votes	%
Iowa Senate primary elections, 2022; District 13	Republican	Cherielynn Westrich	Republican	4,060	99.75
Iowa Senate primary elections, 2022; District 13	Republican	Write-ins	Republican	10	0.25
Iowa Senate general election, 2022; District 13	Republican	Cherielynn Westrich	Republican	13,336	64.89
Iowa Senate general election, 2022; District 13	Republican	Matt Greiner	Democratic	7,207	35.07
Iowa Senate general election, 2022; District 13	Republican	Write-ins		10	0.05

Iowa House of Representatives
Preceded by Mary Gaskill	81st district 2021–2023	Succeeded by Luana Stoltenberg
Iowa Senate
Preceded by Julian Garrett	13th district 2023–2027	Succeeded by Incumbent
