= Gary Mohr =

American politician from Iowa

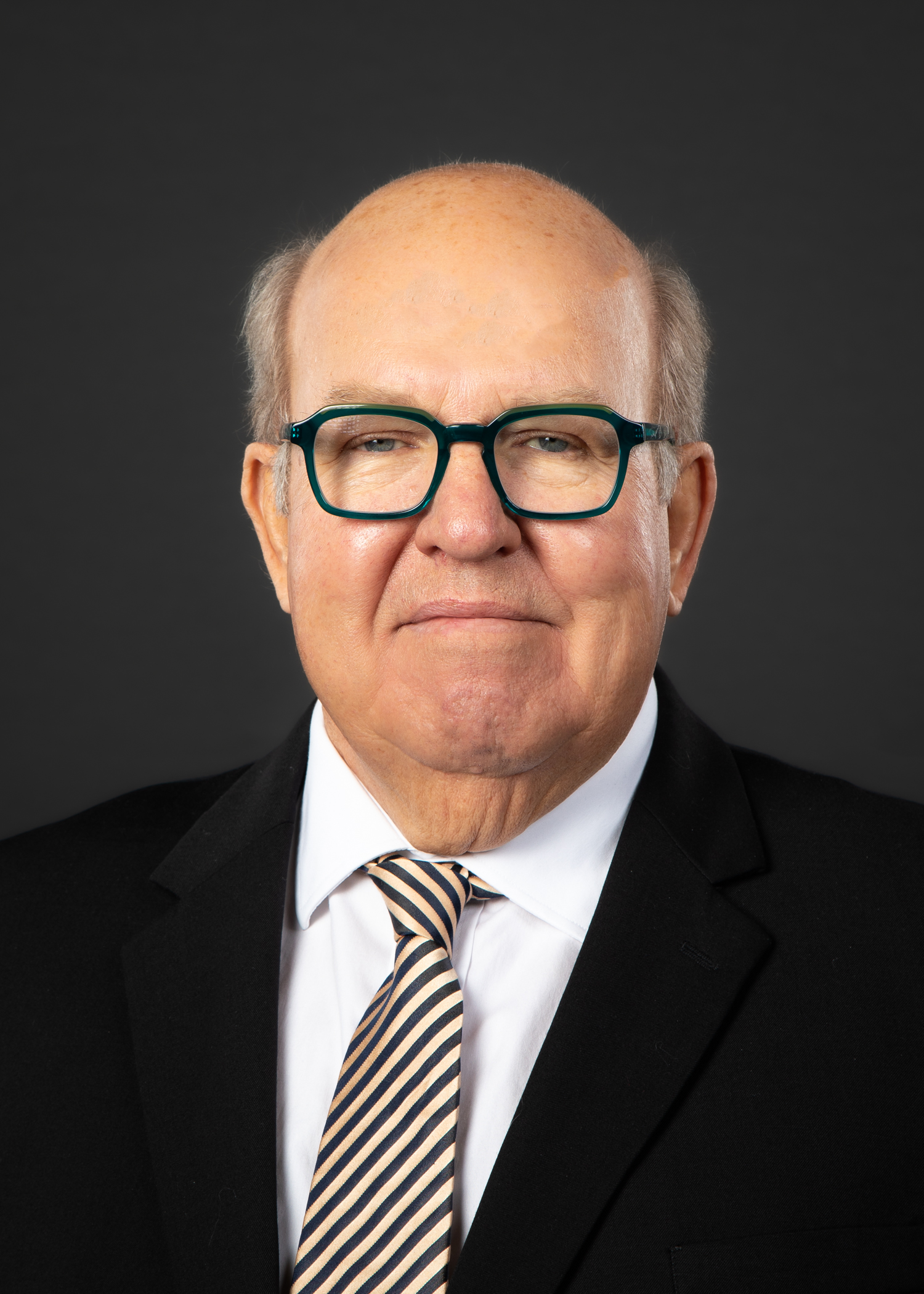

Member of the Iowa House of Representatives from the 93rd district
- Incumbent
- Assumed office 2017
- Preceded by: Linda Miller

Personal details
- Born: December 15, 1951 (age 74) Council Bluffs, Iowa, U.S.
- Party: Republican
- Spouse: Jane
- Children: 4
- Education: Northwest Missouri State University, Iowa State University
- Profession: Educator

Gary Mohr (born December 15, 1951) is an American politician in the state of Iowa. He was elected to the Iowa House of Representatives in 2016 and currently serves as the representative for the 93rd District. He is from Bettendorf and has served as chair of the House Appropriations Committee since 2019, and currently sits on the Commerce, Capital Projects, Fiscal, and Public Safety committees, as well as the Federal and Other Funds Appropriations Subcommittee and the Legislative Council.

Iowa House of Representatives
Preceded by Phyllis Thede	93rd District; 2023 – present	Succeeded by Incumbent
Preceded by Linda Miller	94th District; 2017 – 2023	Succeeded by Mike Vondran
