= Mary Gaskill =

American politician (born 1941)

Mary A. Gaskill
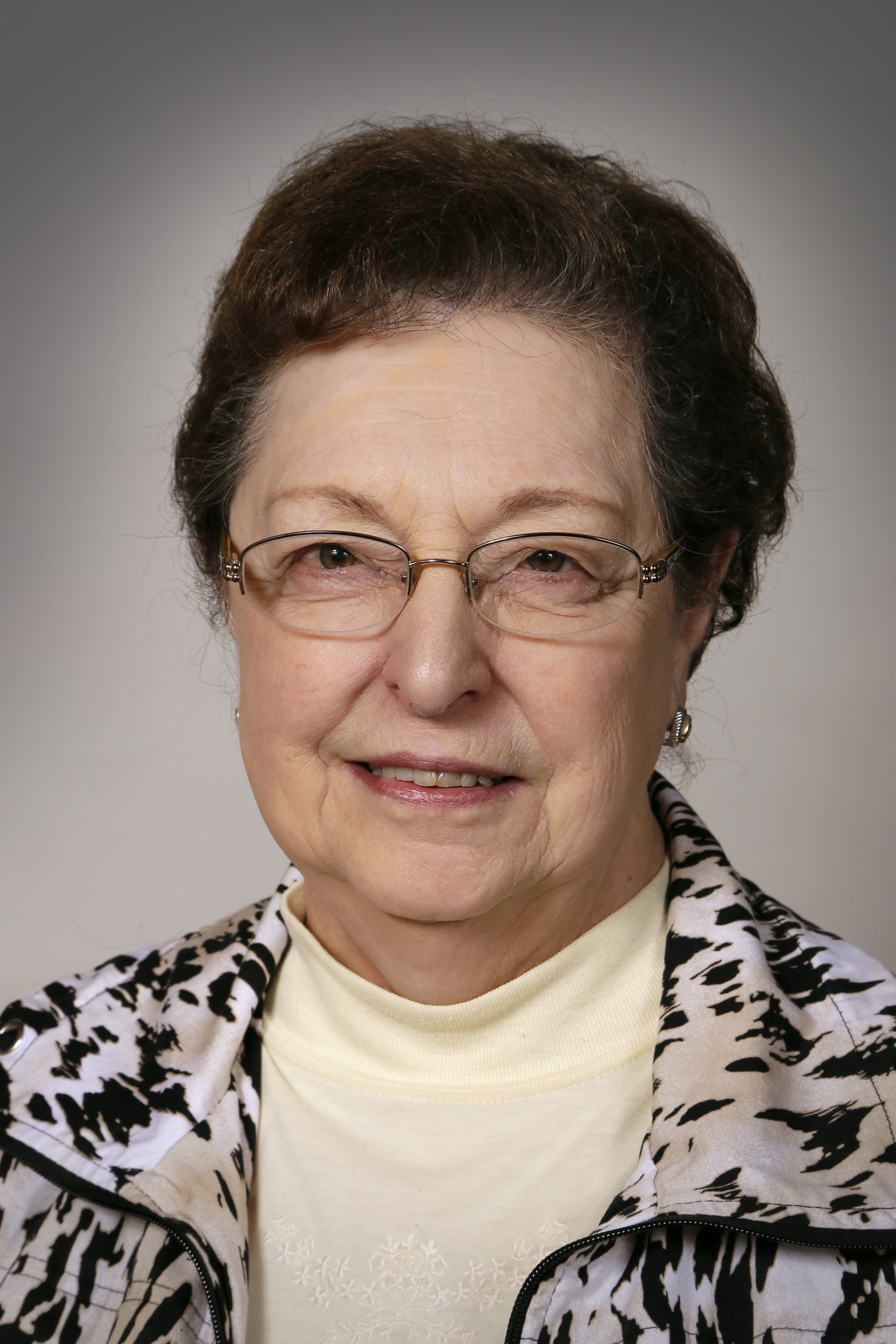

Member of the Iowa House of Representatives from the 81st district (93rd district, 2003–2013)
- In office 2003 – January 10, 2021
- Preceded by: Mark Tremmel
- Succeeded by: Cherielynn Westrich

Personal details
- Born: December 1, 1941 (age 84) Clyde, Missouri, U.S.
- Party: Democratic
- Website: Gaskill's website

Mary A. Gaskill (born December 1, 1941) is an American politician who was the Iowa State Representative from the 81st District. She served in the Iowa House of Representatives from 2003 to 2021.

Gaskill served on several committees in the Iowa House - the Environmental Protection committee; the State Government committee; the Transportation committee; and the Local Government committee, where she was chair. She also served on the Administration and Regulation Appropriations Subcommittee.

Gaskill was re-elected in 2006 with 7,210 votes, running unopposed.

She lost her bid for re-election to Cherielynn Westrich in 2020.

== Family ==
Mary is married to her husband Jim and together they have 4 children: Rex, Alicia, Kathy, and Brenda. Mary and her husband currently live in Ottumwa, Iowa.

== Education ==
Gaskill attended Ravenwood High School where she received her diploma. She later attended Gard Business University.

== Professional experience ==
- Gaskill was a county auditor for the Wapello County
- She was also a clerk to the county auditor for Wapello County

Iowa House of Representatives
Preceded by Mark Tremmel	93rd; 81st district 2003–2013; 2013–2021	Succeeded by Cherielynn Westrich
