= Mike Vondran =

American politician (born 1961)

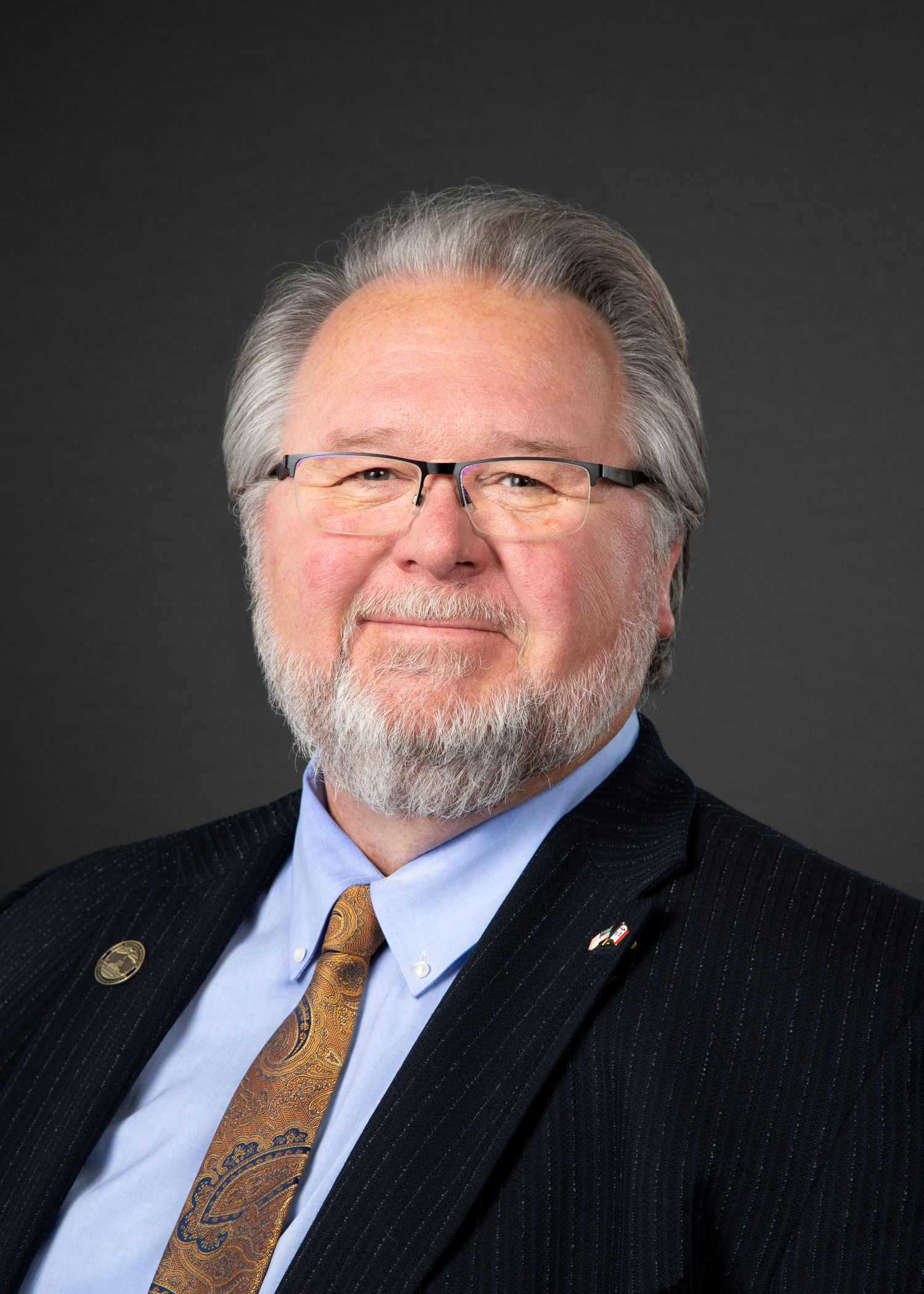

Member of the Iowa House of Representatives from the 94th district
- Incumbent
- Assumed office January 9, 2023
- Preceded by: Gary Mohr (redistricting)

Personal details
- Born: 1961 (age 64–65) Dubuque, Iowa, U.S.
- Party: Republican
- Spouse: Kathleen
- Children: 5 (Note: Including four stepchildren)
- Occupation: Small business owner

Michael Vondran (born 1961) is an American politician and businessman who has represented the 94th district of the Iowa House of Representatives since January 2023, which consists of parts of central Scott County, including most of Eldridge and much of central Davenport. He is a member of the Republican Party.

== Early life ==
Vondran was born in 1961 in Dubuque, Iowa, where he was raised. He graduated from Hempstead High School.

== Political career ==
Vondran ran against Democratic incumbent Phyllis Thede for the 93rd district of the Iowa House of Representatives in 2020, but lost by over 1,900 votes.

Vondran announced his candidacy for the then-newly drawn 94th district of the Iowa House in late 2021, shortly after decennial redistricting. He won the Republican primaries unopposed on June 7, 2022, and defeated incumbent Phyllis Thede by over 1,700 votes in the general election on November 8.

Vondran endorsed Ron DeSantis for president in 2023.

In 2024, Vondran filed to run for reelection. He won the Republican primaries unopposed on June 4, 2024, and will face Democrat Tracy Jones in the general election on November 5, 2024.

Vondran currently serves on the Agriculture, Commerce, and Public Safety committees, the lattermost of which he is chairman.

== Personal life ==
Vondran has a wife, Kathleen, and five adult children, four of whom are stepchildren. He resides in Davenport. He has been the owner of TAG Communications, a communications firm, since 1990, and is the founder and CEO of the HAVlife Foundation, a fundraising organization for at-risk youth, which was inspired by the death of his 13-year-old son Hunter in 2004. He has also served as chairman of Junior Achievement of the Heartland, president of the Mississippi Valley Fair Board, and director of the Quad Cities Chamber of Commerce.

== Electoral history ==
* = incumbent

Election	Political result	Candidate	Party	Votes	%
Iowa House of Representatives Republican primary elections, 2020; District 93; Turnout: 1,653	Republican	Mike Vondran	Republican	1,637	99
Iowa House of Representatives Republican primary elections, 2020; District 93; Turnout: 1,653	Republican	Other/Write-in votes		16	1
Iowa House of Representatives general elections, 2020; District 93; Turnout: 17,099	Democratic	Phyllis Thede*	Democratic	9,530	55.7
Iowa House of Representatives general elections, 2020; District 93; Turnout: 17,099	Democratic	Mike Vondran	Republican	7,549	44.1
Iowa House of Representatives general elections, 2020; District 93; Turnout: 17,099	Democratic	Other/Write-in votes		20	0.1
Iowa House of Representatives Republican primary elections, 2022; District 94; Turnout: 1,597	Republican (newly redistricted)	Mike Vondran	Republican	1,586	99.3
Iowa House of Representatives Republican primary elections, 2022; District 94; Turnout: 1,597	Republican (newly redistricted)	Other/Write-in votes		11	0.7
Iowa House of Representatives general elections, 2022; District 94; Turnout: 13,314	Republican (newly redistricted)	Mike Vondran	Republican	7,512	56.4
Iowa House of Representatives general elections, 2022; District 94; Turnout: 13,314	Republican (newly redistricted)	Phyllis Thede*	Democratic	5,793	43.5
Iowa House of Representatives general elections, 2022; District 94; Turnout: 13,314	Republican (newly redistricted)	Other/Write-in votes		9	0.1
