= Mark Tremmel =

American politician

Member of the Iowa House of Representatives from the 93rd district
- In office January 8, 2001 – January 12, 2003
- Preceded by: Galen Davis
- Succeeded by: Mary Gaskill

Personal details
- Born: August 27, 1971 (age 54) North English, Iowa, United States
- Party: Democratic
- Occupation: Lawyer

Mark Tremmel (born August 27, 1971) is an American politician in the state of Iowa.

Tremmel was born in North English, Iowa and attended Georgetown University and University of Chicago Law School. A Democrat, he served in the Iowa House of Representatives from 2001 to 2003 (93rd district).
