= Sean Bagniewski =

American politician (born 1983)

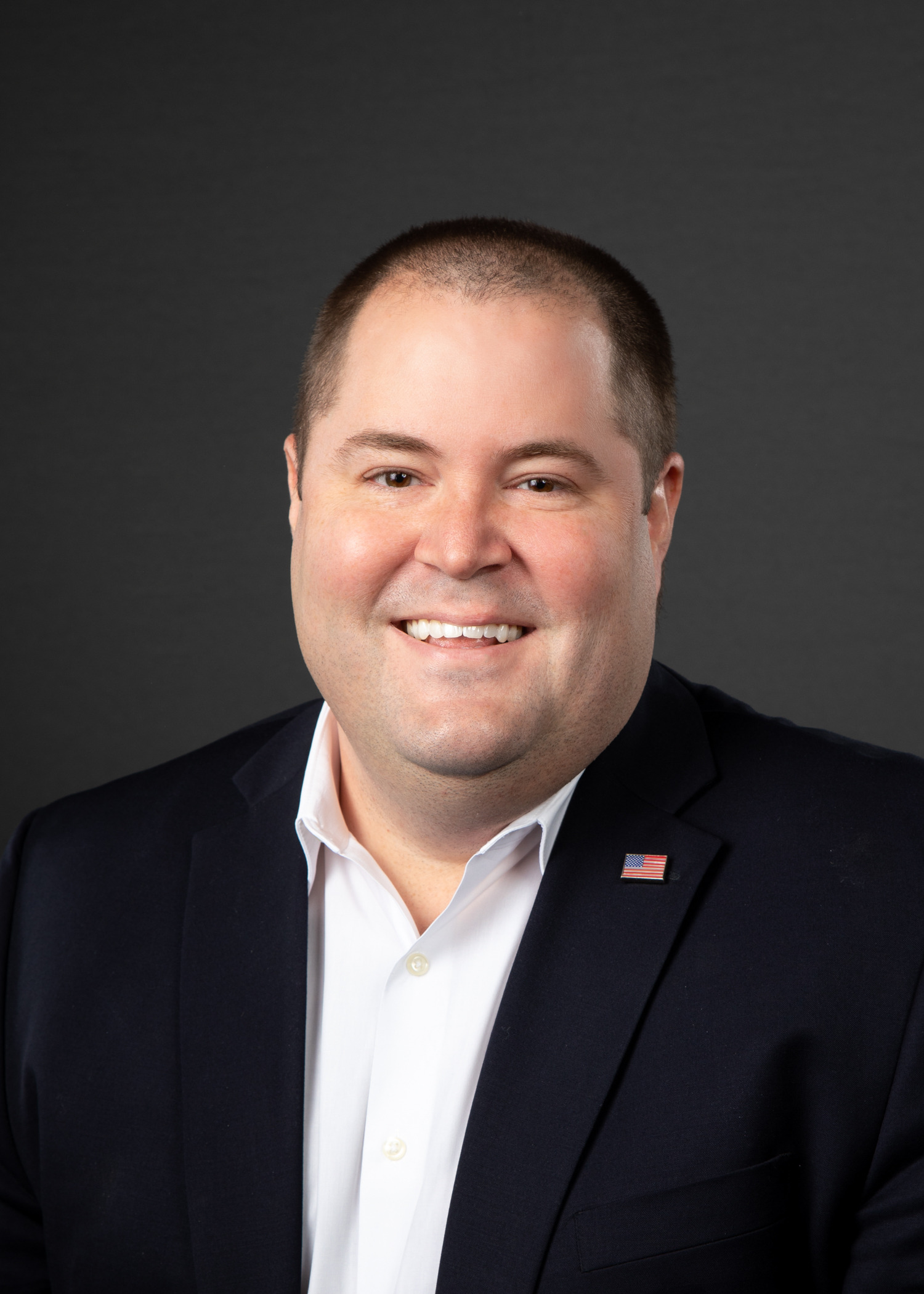

Member of the Iowa House of Representatives from the 35th district
- Incumbent
- Assumed office January 9, 2023
- Preceded by: Ako Abdul-Samad (redistricting)

Personal details
- Born: 1983 (age 42–43) La Crosse, Wisconsin, U.S.
- Party: Democratic
- Spouse: Lindsay
- Children: 2
- Education: Truman State University; Drake University
- Occupation: Attorney, contract administrator

Sean Bagniewski (born 1983) is an American politician and attorney who has represented the 35th district in the Iowa House of Representatives since January 2023, which consists of parts of northwest Des Moines in Polk County. He is a member of the Democratic Party.

== Early life ==
Bagniewski was born in 1983 in La Crosse, Wisconsin, and was raised in Des Moines, Iowa, in a trailer park by a single mother. He attended Theodore Roosevelt High School. He received a bachelor's degree from Truman State University and a Juris Doctor from Drake University Law School.

== Political career ==
Bagniewski clerked for Governor Tom Vilsack and served as chair of the Polk County Democrats prior to his election to the Iowa House.

Bagniewski announced his candidacy for the open 35th district seat in the Iowa House of Representatives shortly after decennial redistricting in 2021. He ran unopposed in the Democratic primary on June 7, 2022, winning with over 98.8 percent of the vote, and defeated independent candidate Dennis McCullough in the general election on November 8 with over 76 percent of the vote.

Bagniewski is a member of the Appropriations, Commerce, Government Oversight, and Transportation committees.

In December 2023, Bagniewski announced that he is running for reelection. He won the Democratic primaries unopposed on June 4, 2024, and will face Republican Angela Schreader and Libertarian David Green in the general election on November 5, 2024.

Bagniewski has said that his priorities include economic growth and education. He is pro-choice and supports stricter gun laws.

Bagniewski has expressed support and praise for Rahm Emanuel and invited him to campaign in Iowa in September 2025.

== Personal life ==
Bagniewski works as an attorney and federal contract administrator. He has a wife, Lindsay, and two children. He resides with his family in the Beaverdale neighborhood of Des Moines. He is the co-founder of the New Iowa Project, a Democratic volunteer network that seeks to increase voter registration and turnout.

Bagniewski was terminated from his job as a Medicaid contract manager with Maximus Health Services shortly after being elected, stirring minor controversy. According to Axios, Maximus received a letter from Iowa Medicaid director Elizabeth Matney eight days after his election stating that Bagniewski's position was full time and that they do not allow exceptions. Matney also wrote that the state required Maximus to submit a transition plan for Bagniewski within two weeks. Bagniewski claimed that there were no alternative positions available, and he was fired on January 29. He pointed to an Iowa law requiring workers elected to a government office be granted a leave of absence from their regular employment, and also claimed that he was falsely told by Iowa Department of Human Services officials that he could keep his job if he was elected. A spokesperson of the DHS told Axios that Maximus has the sole discretion to make employment decisions necessary to their work. Bagniewski said that he would seek legal advice regarding the termination.

== Electoral history ==
Election	Political result	Candidate	Party	Votes	%
Iowa House of Representatives Democratic primary elections, 2022; District 35; Turnout: 3,585	Democratic (newly redistricted)	Sean Bagniewski	Democratic	3,541	98.8
Iowa House of Representatives Democratic primary elections, 2022; District 35; Turnout: 3,585	Democratic (newly redistricted)	Other/Write-in votes		44	1.2
Iowa House of Representatives general elections, 2022; District 35; Turnout: 12,171	Democratic (newly redistricted)	Sean Bagniewski	Democratic	9,360	76.9
Iowa House of Representatives general elections, 2022; District 35; Turnout: 12,171	Democratic (newly redistricted)	Dennis McCullough	Independent	2,783	22.5
Iowa House of Representatives general elections, 2022; District 35; Turnout: 12,171	Democratic (newly redistricted)	Other/Write-in votes		73	0.6
