= Luana Stoltenberg =

American politician (born 1960)

Luana Stolenberg
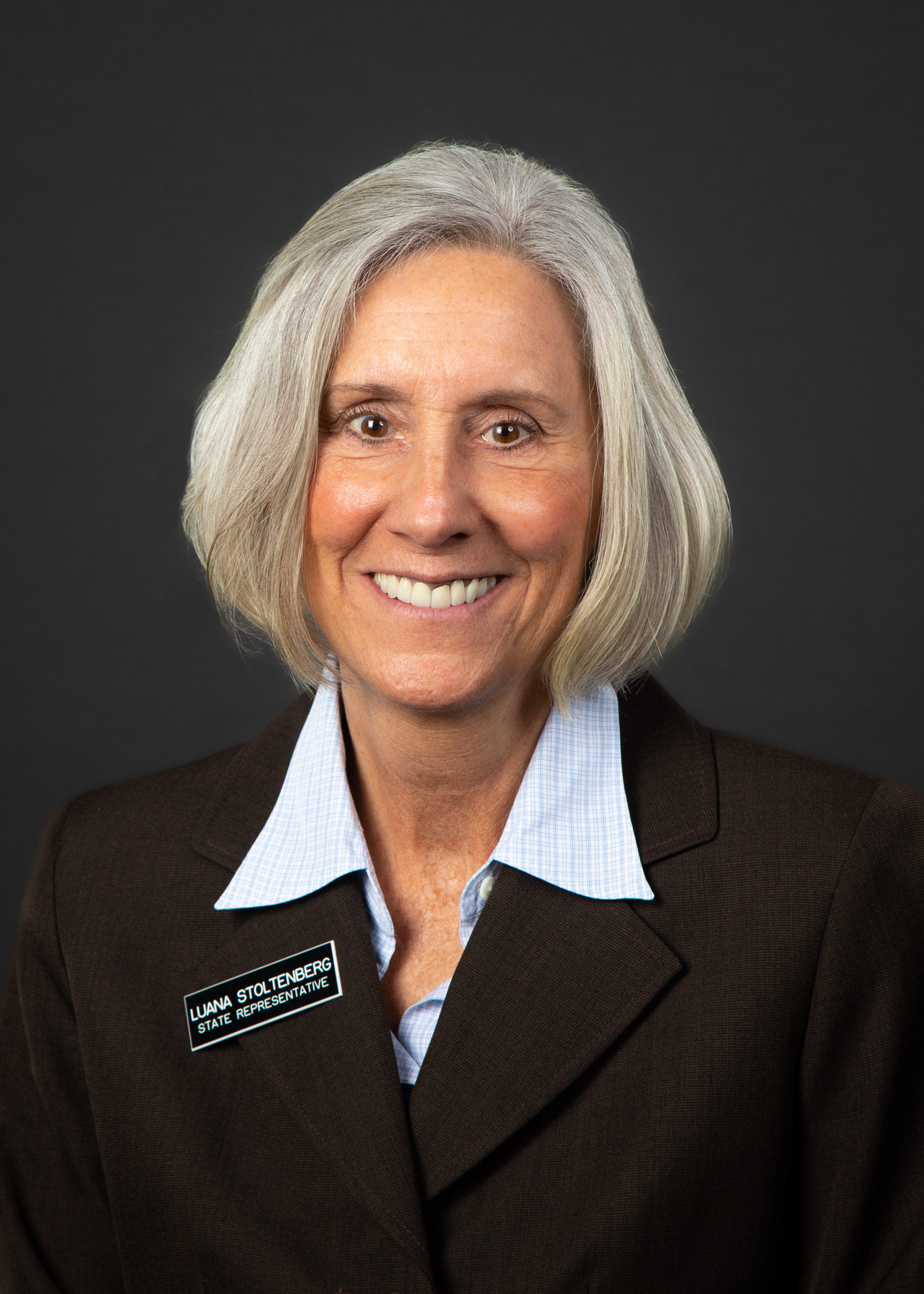

Member of the Iowa House of Representatives from the 81st district
- In office January 9, 2023 – January 13, 2025
- Preceded by: Cherielynn Westrich
- Succeeded by: Daniel Gosa

Personal details
- Born: 1960 (age 65–66) Dubuque, Iowa, U.S.
- Party: Republican

Luana Stoltenberg is an American politician who served as a member of the Iowa House of Representatives for the 81st district from January 2023 to January 2025.

== Early life ==
Stoltenberg was born in Dubuque, Iowa in 1960. She is an author and public speaker.

== Career ==
A member of the Republican Party, Stoltenberg ran for election to the Iowa House in 2022. She won the general election on November 8, 2022, defeating her Democratic opponent Craig Lynn Cooper by 11 votes. She announced in January 2024 that she would not be running for a second term.

== Personal life ==
She resides in Davenport, Iowa. She is married, and has a son.
