= Daniel Gosa =

American politician

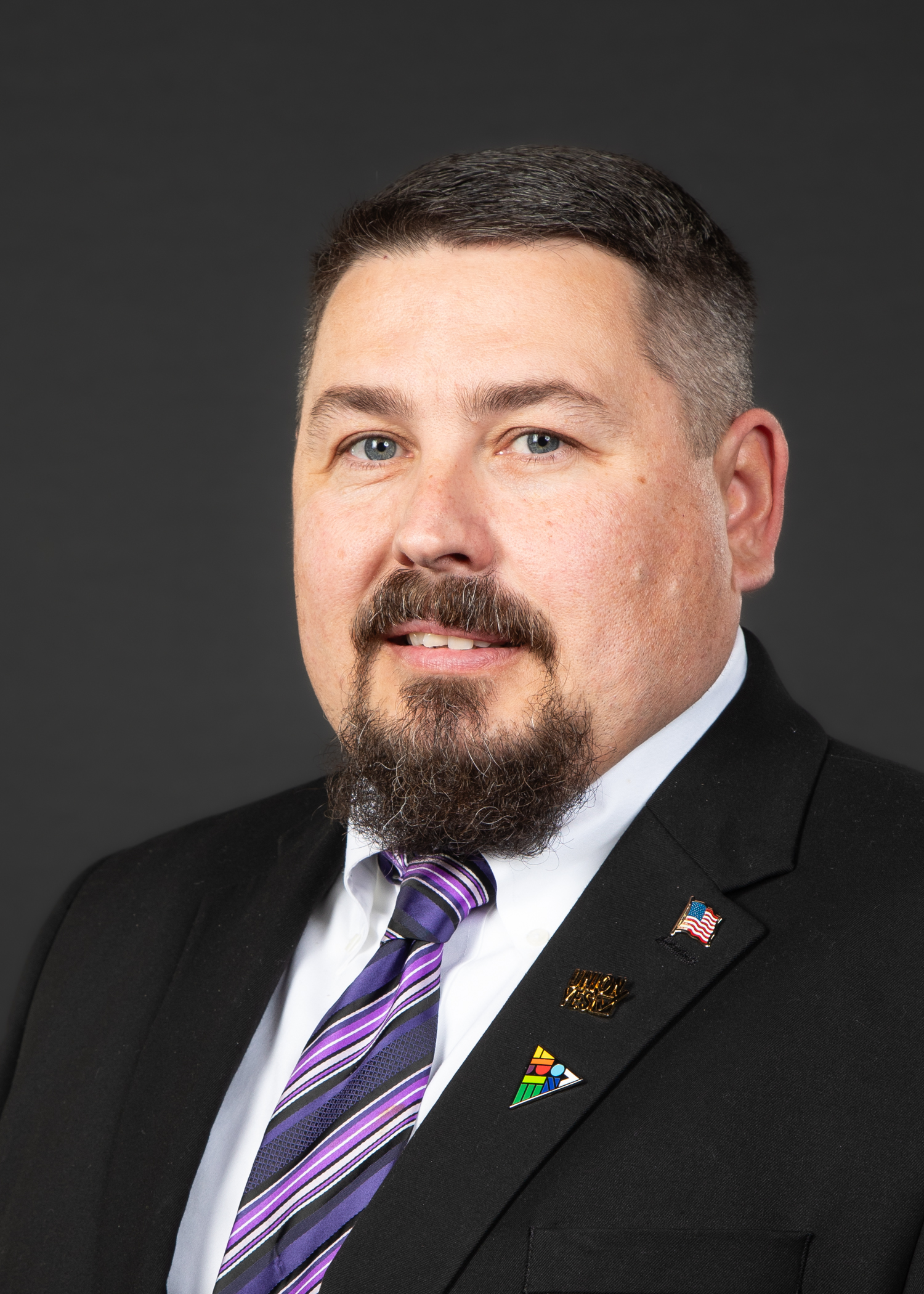

Member of the Iowa House of Representatives from the 81st district
- Incumbent
- Assumed office January 13, 2025
- Preceded by: Luana Stoltenberg

Personal details
- Born: Iowa, U.S.
- Party: Democratic

Daniel Gosa is an American politician who has served as a member of the Iowa House of Representatives for the 81st district since January 13, 2025.

== Early life ==
Gosa was born in Iowa, and lives in Davenport, Iowa. Before being elected to the State Legislature, Gosa served as a Davenport Public Schools board member since 2015. He also served as the boards president.

Gosa is a member of the International Association of Heat and Frost Insulators Local 81 and was elected President of the Quad City Federation of Labour in 2021.

== Career ==
A member of the Democratic Party, Gosa ran for election to the Iowa House of Representatives in the 2024 Iowa House of Representatives election. He won the general election to the 81st district uncontested. He succeeded Luana Stoltenberg.

=== 2025-2027 Committee assignments ===
- Transportation (ranking member)
- Education
- Labor and Workforce
- Local Government
- Public Safety
