= Edgar Bittle =

American politician (born 1943)

Member of the Iowa House of Representatives from the 66th district
- In office January 8, 1973 – January 9, 1977

Personal details
- Born: 1943 (age 82–83) Des Moines, Iowa, U.S.
- Party: Republican
- Spouse: Barbara
- Children: 3
- Education: Theodore Roosevelt High School; Cornell University (BA); University of Michigan (JD)
- Occupation: Politician, attorney

Edgar H. Bittle (born 1943) is an American former politician and lawyer.

Bittle attended Roosevelt High School in his native Des Moines, Iowa, then earned a Bachelor of Arts in government at Cornell University, followed by a Juris Doctor from the University of Michigan Law School. He returned to Des Moines to practice law, becoming a partner in the firm Herrick, Langdon, Belin, and Harris.

Between 1968 and 1972, Bittle was organization chairman of the Polk County Republican Central Committee. He served two consecutive terms for District 66 of the Iowa House of Representatives from 1973 to 1977.

The University of Iowa Libraries holds a collection of Bittle's papers.
