= Iowa's 66th House of Representatives district =

American legislative district

House District 66
- Type: District of the Lower house
- Location: Iowa
- Representative: Dr. Steven Bradley
- Parent organization: Iowa General Assembly

The 66th District of the Iowa House of Representatives in the state of Iowa is composed of Jones County and part of Jackson County.

== Representatives ==
The district has previously been represented by:

- Donald Lippold, 1969–1971
- George Kinley, 1971–1973
- Edgar Bittle, 1973–1977
- Patricia Thompson-Woodworth, 1977–1981
- Dorothy Carpenter, 1981–1983
- Daniel Jay, 1983–1993
- Dennis Renaud, 1993–1995
- Larry Disney, 1995–1997
- Geri Huser, 1997–2003
- Ed Fallon, 2003–2007
- Ako Abdul-Samad, 2007–2013
- Art Staed, 2013–2023
- Dr. Steven Bradley, 2023–Present
