= Iowa's 81st House of Representatives district =

American legislative district

House District 81
- Type: District of the Lower house
- Location: Iowa
- Representative: Daniel Gosa
- Parent organization: Iowa General Assembly

The 81st District of the Iowa House of Representatives in the state of Iowa is part of Scott County.

== Current elected officials ==
Daniel Gosa is the representative currently representing the district.

== Past representatives ==
The district has previously been represented by:

- William H. Harbor, 1971–1973
- Gregory Cusack, 1973–1981
- Thomas H. Fey, 1981–1983
- Ned Chiodo, 1983–1985
- Jack Hatch, 1985–1993
- Jack Drake, 1993–2003
- Jamie Van Fossen, 2003–2009
- Phyllis Thede, 2009–2013
- Mary Gaskill, 2013–2021
- Cherielynn Westrich, 2021–2023
- Luana Stoltenberg, 2023–2025
- Daniel Gosa, 2025–Present
