= Iowa's 35th House of Representatives district =

American legislative district

House District 35
- Type: District of the Lower house
- Location: Iowa
- Representative: Sean Bagniewski
- Parent organization: Iowa General Assembly

The 35th District of the Iowa House of Representatives in the state of Iowa. It is currently composed of part of Polk County.

== Current elected officials ==
Sean Bagniewski is the representative currently representing the district.

== Past representatives ==
The district has previously been represented by:

- Harold O. Fischer, 1971–1973
- Donald L. Lippold, 1973–1975
- Diane Brandt, 1975–1983
- Mike Connolly, 1983–1990
- Pat Murphy, 1990–1993
- Pam Jochum, 1993–2003
- Kraig Paulsen, 2003–2013
- Sean Bagniewski, 2013–present
