= Ken Croken =

American politician (born 1950)

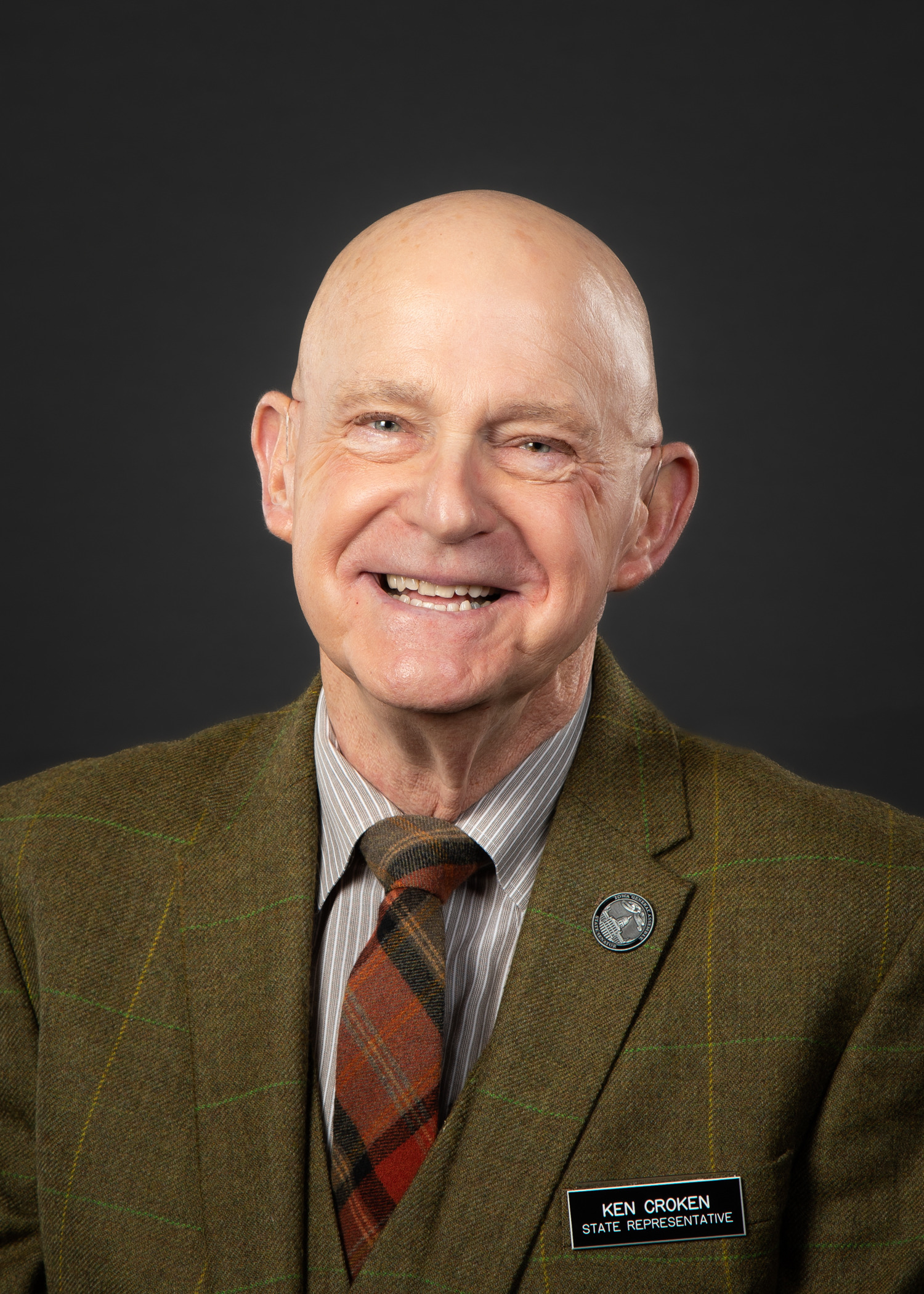
- Official portrait, 2023

Member of the Iowa House of Representatives from the 97th district
- Incumbent
- Assumed office January 9, 2023
- Preceded by: Norlin Mommsen (redistricting)
- Succeeded by: Adam Peters (elect)

Personal details
- Born: 1950 (age 75–76) Long Branch, New Jersey, U.S.
- Party: Democratic
- Spouse: Kathryn McKnight (m. 1980; d. 2021)
- Children: 2
- Education: Saint Joseph's University; New England Law Boston

Kenneth R. Croken (born 1950) is an American politician, retired attorney, and former marketing executive who has represented the 97th district of the Iowa House of Representatives since January 2023, which covers central Davenport. He is a member of the Democratic Party.

== Early life and education ==
Croken was born in 1950 in Long Branch, New Jersey, and was raised in Keansburg, New Jersey. He attended Mater Dei High School. He received a bachelor's degree from Saint Joseph's University and a Juris Doctor from New England Law Boston.

== Political career ==
While living in Connecticut, Croken worked on Bruce Morrison's 1982 campaign for Connecticut's 3rd congressional district, and served as a member of his staff in Washington, D.C., after he won the election.

Croken was elected to a single term on the Scott County Board of Supervisors in 2018. He expressed interest in running for Iowa's 2nd congressional district during the 2020 election, but ultimately chose not to run and instead endorsed Rita Hart.

Croken announced his candidacy for the 97th district of the Iowa House of Representatives in November 2021, shortly after decennial redistricting. He won the Democratic primaries unopposed on June 7, 2022, and defeated Libertarian Andrew Onsgard in the general election on November 8 by over 3,500 votes.

In August 2023, Croken announced that he was running for mayor of Davenport. Incumbent mayor Mike Matson defeated him in the general election on November 7, 2023, by over 1,600 votes.

In 2024, Croken filed to run for reelection to the Iowa House. He won the Democratic primaries unopposed on June 4, 2024, and faced Republican Josue Rodriguez in the general election on November 5, 2024, whom he defeated by over 2,300 votes.

Croken again ran for reelection in 2026. He was challenged in the Democratic primary on June 2, 2026, by Adam Peters, who defeated him by over 600 votes. Peters would go on to win the general election on November 3, 2026.

During his time in the House, Croken served on the Administration and Rules, Labor and Workforce, Local Government, Ways and Means, Veterans Affairs, and Environmental Protection committees.

Croken has been described as a progressive. He introduced bills in the Iowa Legislature to expand medical leave laws, raise the minimum wage in Iowa, and allow for Project Labor Agreements for public contracts. He also advocated for the Major Richard Star Act, a bill in Congress that would allow injured veterans who have served less than 20 years to collect full disability and retirement benefits. He also voiced opposition to several laws passed by the Iowa Legislature, such as a law banning most abortions after six weeks of pregnancy, a law that repealed discrimination protections for transgender people, and a law establishing education savings accounts funded by taxpayer money to be used by students for private school expenses.

== Personal life ==
Croken is a retired attorney and a former marketing executive and public relations manager. He has worked for companies such as Edelman, IBM, Save the Children, and the Legal Services Corporation. He frequently moved between states for his career, and has lived in New York, Texas, Minnesota, and Florida.

In 2003, Croken was hired by Genesis Health System as their chief marketing officer and decided to settle in Davenport permanently. He retired from Genesis Health in 2017. In 2018, he was hired as the senior vice president of TAG Communications, a Davenport-based advertising and marketing agency owned by fellow state legislator Mike Vondran. He is also an adjunct professor in marketing at St. Ambrose University and is a member of the Quad Cities River Bandits ownership group.

Croken married Kathryn McKnight in 1980, and they remained married until her death from breast cancer in 2021. They had two children together.

== Electoral history ==
* = incumbent

Election	Political result	Candidate	Party	Votes	%
Iowa House of Representatives Democratic primary elections, 2022; District 97; Turnout: 1,434	Democratic (newly redistricted)	Ken Croken	Democratic	1,421	99.1
Iowa House of Representatives Democratic primary elections, 2022; District 97; Turnout: 1,434	Democratic (newly redistricted)	Other/Write-in votes		13	0.9
Iowa House of Representatives general elections, 2022; District 97; Turnout: 7,856	Democratic (newly redistricted)	Ken Croken	Democratic	5,638	71.8
Iowa House of Representatives general elections, 2022; District 97; Turnout: 7,856	Democratic (newly redistricted)	Andrew Onsgard	Libertarian	2,092	26.6
Iowa House of Representatives general elections, 2022; District 97; Turnout: 7,856	Democratic (newly redistricted)	Other/Write-in votes		126	1.6
Davenport, Iowa, mayoral election, 2023; Turnout: 10,862	Democratic	Mike Matson*	Democratic	6,258	57.6
Davenport, Iowa, mayoral election, 2023; Turnout: 10,862	Democratic	Ken Croken	Democratic	4,604	42.4
Iowa House of Representatives Democratic primary elections, 2024; District 97; Turnout: 574	Democratic	Ken Croken*	Democratic	571	99.5
Iowa House of Representatives Democratic primary elections, 2024; District 97; Turnout: 574	Democratic	Other/Write-in votes		3	0.5
Iowa House of Representatives general elections, 2024; District 97; Turnout: 13,199	Democratic	Ken Croken*	Democratic	7,753	58.7
Iowa House of Representatives general elections, 2024; District 97; Turnout: 13,199	Democratic	Josue Rodriguez	Republican	5,429	41.1
Iowa House of Representatives general elections, 2024; District 97; Turnout: 13,199	Democratic	Other/Write-in votes		17	0.1
Iowa House of Representatives Democratic primary elections, 2026; District 97; Turnout: 2,469	Democratic	Adam Peters	Democratic	1,554	62.9
Iowa House of Representatives Democratic primary elections, 2026; District 97; Turnout: 2,469	Democratic	Ken Croken*	Democratic	914	37
Iowa House of Representatives Democratic primary elections, 2026; District 97; Turnout: 2,469	Democratic	Other/Write-in votes		1	.04
