= Adam Peters (politician) =

American politician

Member of the Iowa House of Representatives from the 97th district
- Member-elect
- Assumed office January 1, 2027
- Preceded by: Ken Croken

Personal details
- Party: Democratic
- Website: Campaign website

Adam Peters is an American politician. A member of the Democratic Party, he was elected to the Iowa House of Representatives in 2026, representing the 97th district. He unseated fellow Democrat Ken Croken in the primary for the 2026 election. He was raised in Walcott, Iowa. He is the director of a nonprofit. He is LGBTQ.
