= Diane Brandt =

American politician (1938–2010)

Member of the Iowa House of Representatives from the 35th district
- In office January 13, 1975 – January 9, 1983
- Preceded by: Donald L. Lippold
- Succeeded by: Mike Connolly

Personal details
- Born: August 28, 1938 Emmet County, Iowa, U.S.
- Died: June 1, 2010 (aged 71) Cedar Falls, Iowa, U.S.
- Party: Democratic

Diane L. Brandt (August 28, 1938 – June 1, 2010) was an American politician who served in the Iowa House of Representatives from the 35th district from 1975 to 1983. In 2003, she established an endowed fund with Iowa State University to provide scholarships for women in science, engineering, mathematics and agriculture, which came into effect in 2012. A commemorative brick was placed in the Plaza of Heroines outside of Catt Hall on Iowa State's campus to honor Brandt.
