= Ike Boettger =

American football player (born 1994)

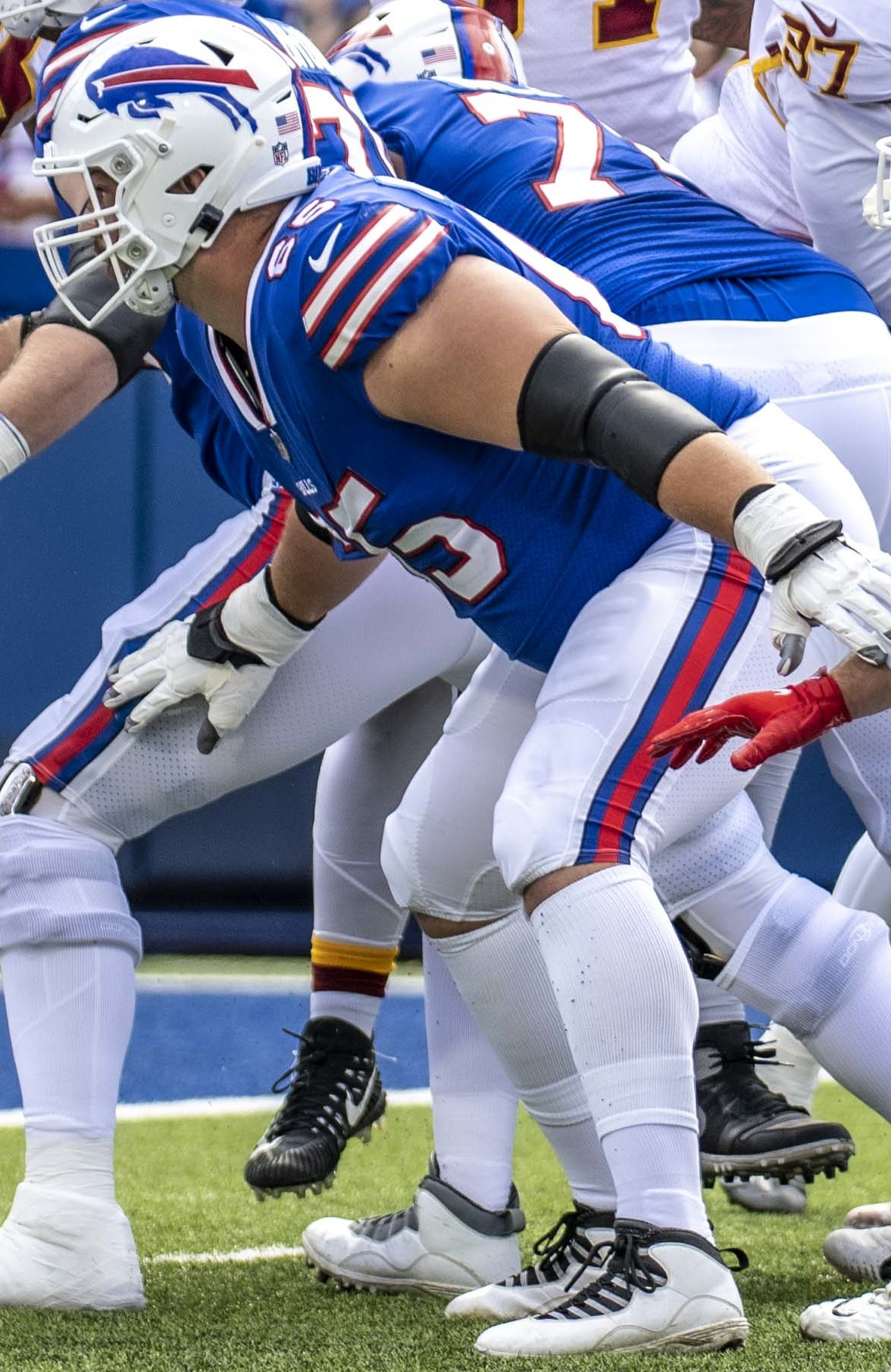
- Boettger with the Buffalo Bills in 2021

No. 65, 78
- Position: Guard

Personal information
- Born: October 5, 1994 (age 32); Cedar Falls, Iowa, U.S.
- Listed height: 6 ft 6 in (1.98 m)
- Listed weight: 313 lb (142 kg)

Career information
- High school: Cedar Falls (IA)
- College: Iowa (2013–2017)
- NFL draft: 2018: undrafted

Career history
- Buffalo Bills (2018)*; Kansas City Chiefs (2018); Buffalo Bills (2018–2022); Indianapolis Colts (2023); Detroit Lions (2024)*; Carolina Panthers (2024)*
- * Offseason or practice squad member only

Career NFL statistics
- Games played: 36
- Games started: 17
- Stats at Pro Football Reference

Isaac "Ike" Boettger (born October 5, 1994) is an American former professional football guard. He played college football for the Iowa Hawkeyes.

== Early life ==
At Cedar Falls High School in Cedar Falls, Iowa, Boettger played tight end, wide receiver, quarterback and defensive back. He was lightly recruited, but impressed Iowa coaches at a junior camp despite weighing only 220 pounds. As a junior quarterback, he threw for 750 yards, 9 touchdowns, and one interception. As a senior tight end, he had 33 receptions for 452 yards and 4 touchdowns. Boettger was a team captain in both basketball and football. Boettger was teammates with Alabama and NFL lineman Ross Pierschbacher at Cedar Falls High School.

== College career ==
After redshirting in 2013, Boettger played four seasons at Iowa. He was healthy his freshman year, seeing reserve time and action as a blocking tight end. In 2015, Boettger started at right tackle in the first six games in the Hawkeyes' Big Ten West championship season before missing the remainder of the season due to injury. He returned in 2016, starting all but one game at tackle, winning honorable mention all-Big Ten and Hawkeye Comeback Player of the Year honors. In 2017, Boettger started the first two games of the season, including a 24–3 win against eventual teammate Josh Allen and Wyoming, before missing the remainder of the season with an achilles injury. Boettger was replaced at the right tackle position by true freshman Tristan Wirfs.

== Professional career ==
=== Buffalo Bills (first stint) ===
Boettger signed with the Buffalo Bills as an undrafted free agent on May 11, 2018. He was waived on September 1, 2018.

=== Kansas City Chiefs ===
On September 2, 2018, Boettger was claimed off waivers by the Kansas City Chiefs. He was waived on September 11, 2018.

=== Buffalo Bills (second stint) ===
On September 12, 2018, the Bills claimed Boettger off waivers from the Chiefs. He made his NFL debut on December 2, 2018 against the Miami Dolphins.

The Bills placed a restricted free agent tender on Boettger on March 17, 2021. He signed the one-year contract on April 27.

Boettger’s 2021 training camp was delayed because he came down with COVID-19 and missed most of the first two weeks. He was named a backup guard to start the season, and then named the starting left guard in Week 8 following an injury to Jon Feliciano. He suffered a torn Achilles in Week 16 and was placed on injured reserve on December 27.

On March 28, 2022, the Bills re-signed Boettger to a one-year contract. He was placed on the reserve/physically unable to perform (PUP) list to start the season on August 23, 2022. On December 19, Boettger was activated from reserve/PUP.

On March 3, 2023, the Bills re-signed Boettger to a one-year contract. He was released on August 29, 2023.

=== Indianapolis Colts ===
On September 12, 2023, the Indianapolis Colts signed Boettger to their practice squad. He was elevated to the active roster on September 30. He was signed to the active roster on October 11. He was released on October 31, and re-signed to the practice squad. He was not signed to a reserve/future contract after the season and thus became a free agent upon the expiration of his practice squad contract.

=== Detroit Lions ===
On July 22, 2024, Boettger signed with the Detroit Lions. He was waived on August 12.

=== Carolina Panthers ===
On August 16, 2024, Boettger signed with the Carolina Panthers. He was released on August 27.
