= Cedar Falls Community School District =

Public school district in Cedar Falls, Iowa, United States

Coordinates: 42.537170°N 92.457541°W

Location
- Cedar Falls, Iowa Black Hawk County United States
- Coordinates: 42.537170, -92.457541

District information
- Type: Local school district
- Motto: Educating each student to be a life-long learner and a caring, responsible citizen.
- Grades: K-12
- Established: 1863
- Superintendent: Dr. Andy Pattee
- Schools: 10
- Budget: $81,029,000 (2020-21)
- NCES District ID: 1906510

Students and staff
- Students: 5892 (2022-23)
- Teachers: 416.15 FTE
- Staff: 378.01 FTE
- Student–teacher ratio: 14.16
- Athletic conference: Mississippi Valley Conference (Iowa)
- District mascot: Tigers
- Colors: Red and Black

Cedar Falls Community School District or Cedar Falls Community Schools is a public school district for Cedar Falls, Iowa. Its headquarters is located at 1002 West First Street in Cedar Falls.

The district is in Black Hawk County and includes almost all of the Cedar Falls city limits as well as a small section of Waterloo.

The area of the district is 60.6 square miles (157 km^{2}) with approximately 36,000 residents. The district employs over 500 personnel in its ten schools and two support buildings. The district's motto is, "Educating each student to be a life-long learner and a caring, responsible citizen."

== History ==
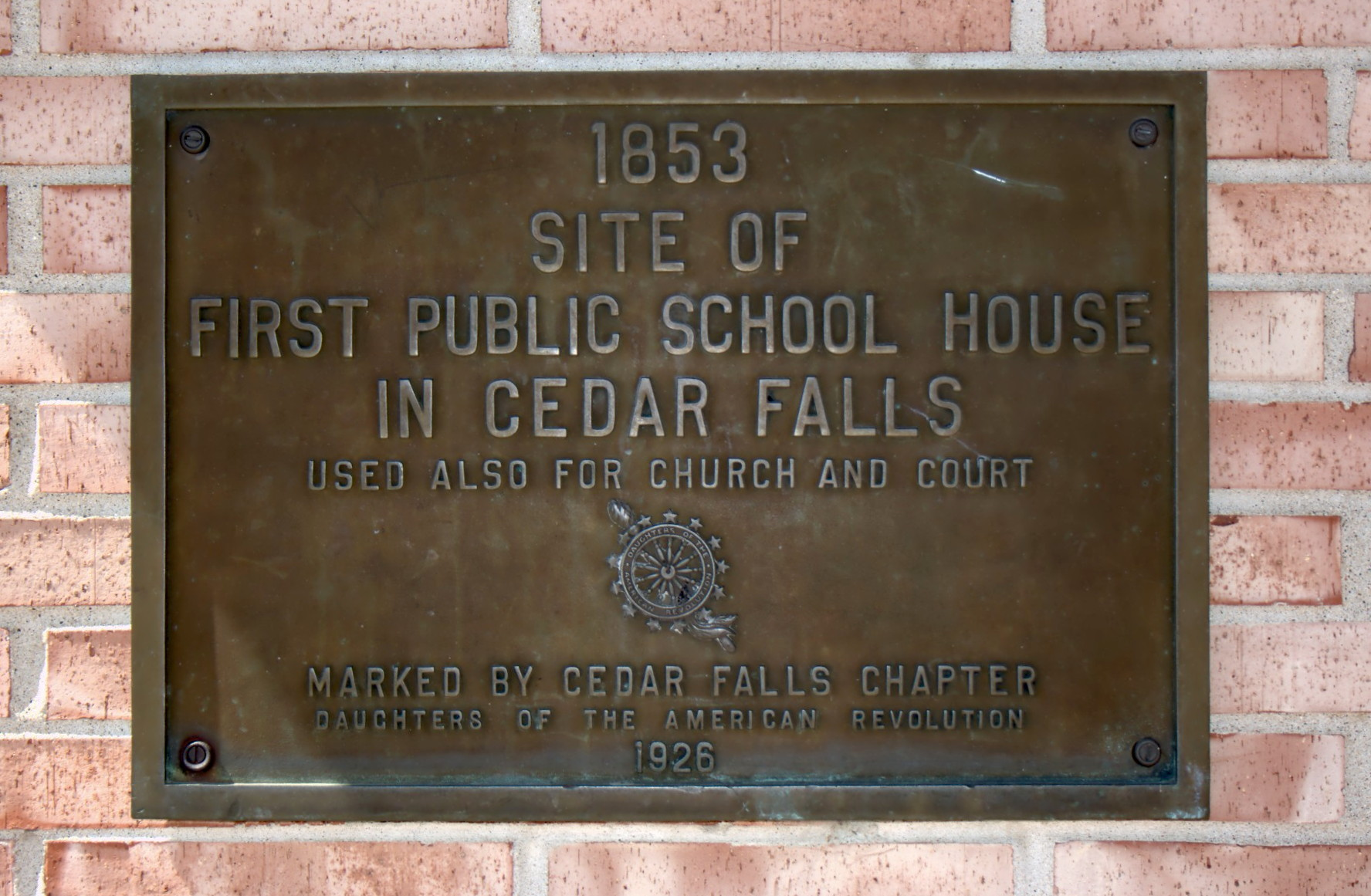
Marker commemorating the "1853 Site of First Public School House in Cedar Falls". Located at the corners of 5th Street and Main Street in downtown Cedar Falls.

Founding

In 1846, Mrs. Jackson Taylor opened the first school in her home at Waterloo Road and East 13th Streets. Early residents recalled seeing parents escort their children to school because Native Americans living in the area were sighted in the woods near the Taylor home. Today, a marker commemorates the site of the Taylor home.

Central School

In 1863, the old Central School was constructed to serve grades K-12 which occupied an entire city block. In 1875, due to population increases, a west wing addition was added to the main building.

Lincoln School

In the 1890s the name was changed to Lincoln School. Later (before 1893) an east wing addition as well as a bell tower was added.

First high school

In 1900, Cedar Falls High School was constructed as the first separate high school in Cedar Falls. The building was located where the Cedar Falls Recreation Center currently resides. An addition was added in 1914 and this building was used until 1953, then served as a recreation center itself until the early 1990s, when it was demolished to make way for the current facility.

Second and Third Lincoln Schools

In 1924, a new Lincoln School was constructed across the street from the original Lincoln School. The second Lincoln School was demolished in 2005, and the third Lincoln School built in its place and currently occupies 2 entire city blocks.

== Schools ==
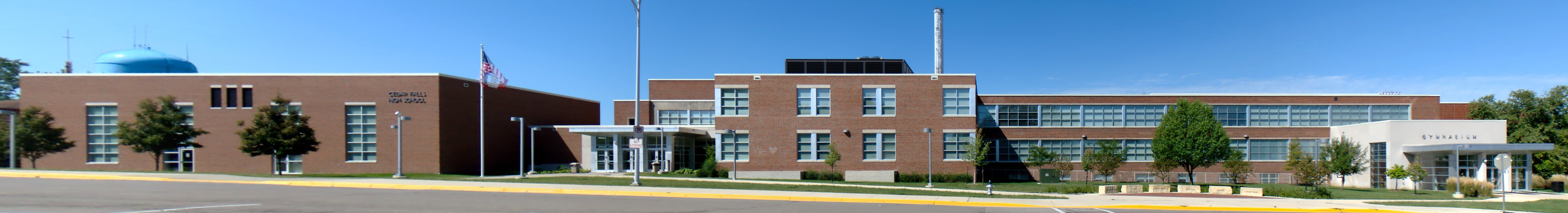
Cedar Falls High School

High schools

- Cedar Falls High School
- Cedar Falls Alternative High School

Middle schools

- Holmes Junior High School
- Peet Junior High School

Primary schools

- Aldrich Elementary School
- Cedar Heights Elementary School
- Hansen Elementary School
- Lincoln Elementary School
- North Cedar Elementary School
- Orchard Hill Elementary School
- Southdale Elementary School

== See also ==
- List of school districts in Iowa
