= James Middleswart =

American politician (1912–1993)

James Ira Middleswart (April 8, 1912 – August 5, 1993) was an American politician.

James Middleswart was born to parents David and Eva Morgan Middleswart in Indianola, Iowa, on April 8, 1912. He graduated from Indianola High School in 1930, studied business at Simpson College until 1932, and subsequently became a farmer. Middleswart was a soil district commissioner and district secretary before winning his first election to the Iowa House of Representatives in 1966. Middleswart held the District 27 seat for two terms, won reelection in District 92 in 1970, and occupied the District 93 seat from 1973 to 1979. Throughout his political career, Middleswart was affiliated with the Democratic Party.

Middleswart was married to Geraldine Denly from 1936 to his death on August 5, 1993.
