= Patricia Thompson-Woodworth =

American politician (1927–2011)

Patricia Lathen Thompson-Woodworth (September 17, 1927 – October 22, 2011) was an American politician.

== Personal life ==
Patricia Lathen was born in Grant, Iowa, on September 17, 1927, to parents Guy and Grace. She graduated from high school in Elliott in 1945, pursued an Associate of Arts degree at the University of Nebraska, then married dentist George W. Thompson Jr. in 1947. The couple raised five children in West Des Moines, where they had moved in 1954. She worked for Brenton Banks until her retirement in 1993, the same year George Thompson died. In 1999, she married Wayne Woodworth, who worked for Principal Financial Group, and had been a faculty member at Drake University. Patricia Thompson-Woodworth died on October 22, 2011 of Alzheimer's disease in West Des Moines.

== Political career ==
Thompson-Woodworth was a member of the board of directors of the West Des Moines Community School District, and had served as school board president for two years prior to seeking a seat on the Iowa House of Representatives. She served two full terms as a Republican state representative for District 66, from January 10, 1977 to January 11, 1981.
