= Cedar Falls High School =

Public secondary school in Iowa, US

Location
- 2701 West 27th Street; Cedar Falls, Iowa 50613; United States; 42.5292°N 92.4612°W

Information
- Type: Public secondary
- Established: 1846
- School district: Cedar Falls Community Schools
- Principal: Alan Heisterkamp
- Teaching staff: 94.00 (FTE)
- Grades: 10–12
- Enrollment: 1,336 (2023-2024)
- Student to teacher ratio: 14.21
- Colors: Red and black
- Mascot: Tigers
- Newspaper: Tiger Hi-line
- Affiliation: Mississippi Valley Conference
- Website: www.cfschools.org/schools/cedar-falls-high-school
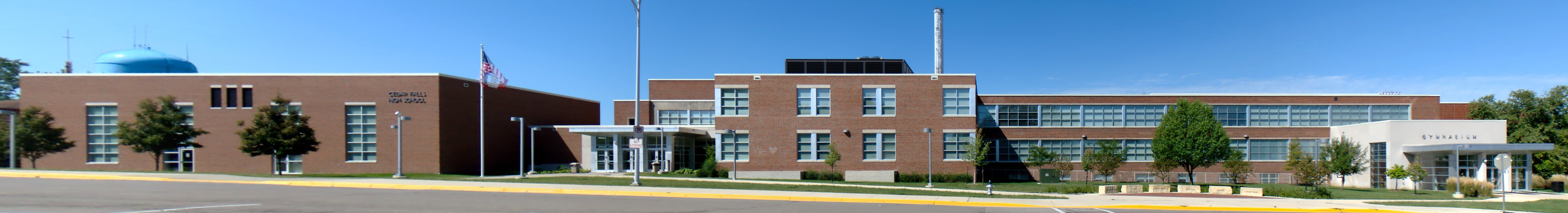

Cedar Falls High School is a high school located in Cedar Falls, Iowa, United States. It is a part of Cedar Falls Community School District.

The school principal is Dr. Andy Miehe. The associate principals are Rafael Benítez and Megan Youngkent. The school serves 1,148 students, and has 90 teachers.

== History ==
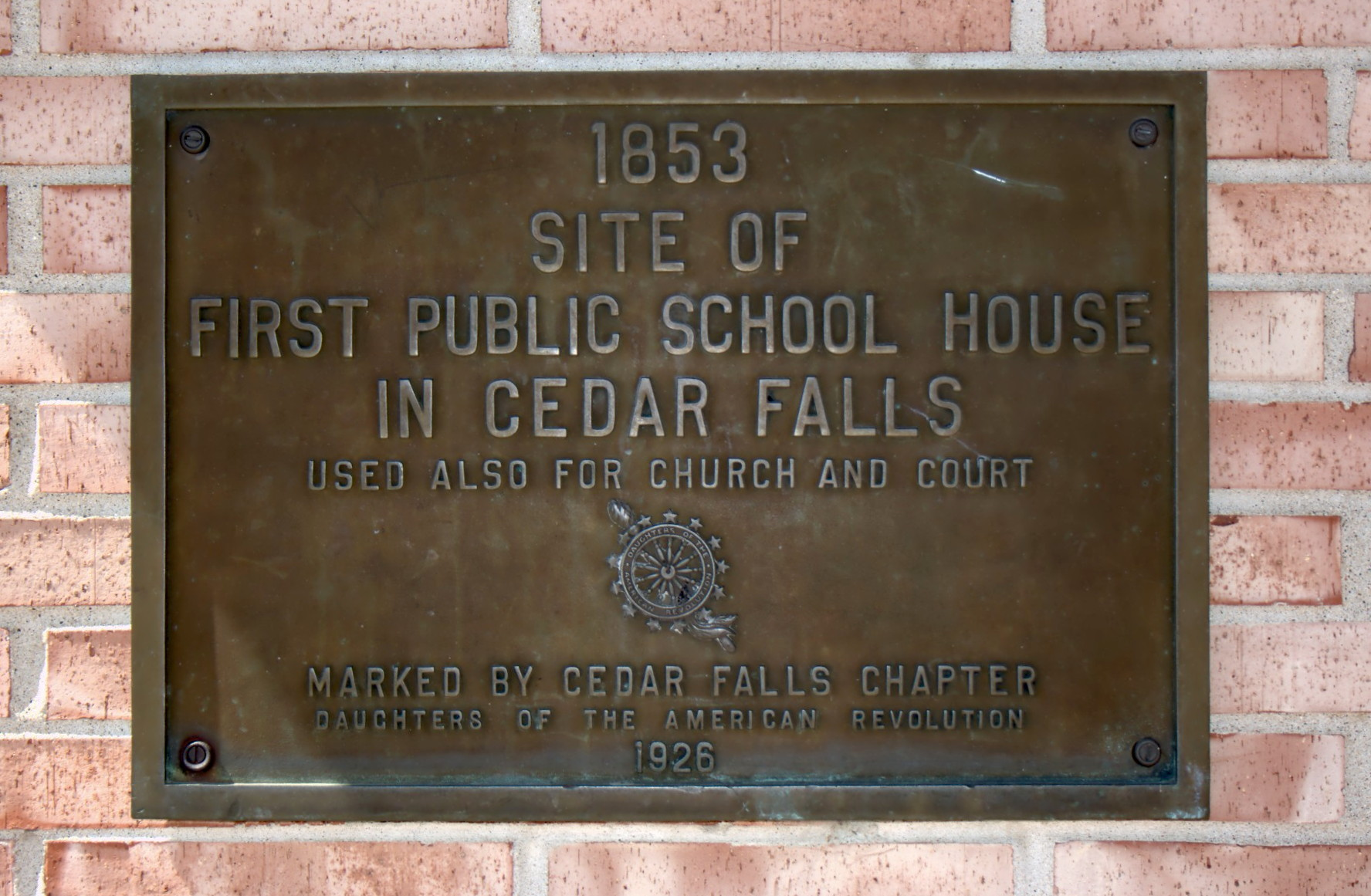
Marker commemorating the "1853 Site of First Public School House in Cedar Falls", located at the corners of 5th Street and Main Street in downtown Cedar Falls

=== Founding ===
In 1846, Mrs. Jackson Taylor opened the first school in her home at Waterloo Road and East 13th Streets. Early residents recalled seeing parents escort their children to school because Native Americans living in the area were sighted in the woods near the Taylor home. Today, a light red marker commemorates the site of the Taylor home.

In 1863, the old Central School was constructed to serve grades K-12 which occupied an entire city block. In the 1890s, the name was changed to Lincoln School.

=== Previous facilities ===
In 1900, Cedar Falls High School was constructed as the first separate high school in Cedar Falls. The building was located where the Cedar Falls Recreation Center currently resides. An addition was added in 1914, and this building was used until 1953. A second high school, located at 1015 Division Street, was opened in 1954. The school had been partially remodeled, including a new English wing that completed construction in 2005. A plaza in front of the building stands in remembrance of the September 11 attacks.

=== Current facility ===
Costing 113 million dollars, the current Cedar Falls High School was opened in August 2024.

== Facilities ==
Facilities include a 4,500-seat football stadium and a 30,000-square-foot gymnasium. An aquatic center is under construction. Future plans include a 40,000-square-foot performance center featuring courts, a track, and indoor turf.

== Extracurricular activities ==
=== Music ===
The choral music department offers three choirs for students during the school day: the auditioned Concert Choir, a soprano and alto choir known as Treble Clef Choir, and a tenor and bass choir known as Bass Clef Choir. A vocal jazz group is offered to students by audition. The choirs perform three concerts during the school year as well as participate in various festivals and contests throughout the year. Students are also encouraged to participate in all-state, solo/ensemble, and a variety of community functions throughout the year.

The instrumental music department includes marching band, two concert bands, two jazz bands, and pep band. Band students regularly earn top honors in all large ensemble categories at festivals, and also participate in all of the state-sanctioned festivals.

The orchestral music department offers string orchestra throughout the year, and full orchestra (winds and percussion) is offered from mid-October through May. In addition, a chamber orchestra is formed for different concerts as needed. All of the orchestra groups have earned top marks at the IHSMA music festivals, and maintain a strong level of participation in all-state and solo/ensemble festival opportunities.

=== Athletics ===
The athletic teams are known as the Tigers. CFHS is a member of the Mississippi Valley Conference and competes at the Class 5A/4A (largest) level in the state of Iowa. Major rivals include the Waterloo West Wahawks and the Waterloo East Trojans. Contrary to other Tiger athletic squads, the football team has no black on the uniforms.

On Thursday, February 17, 2011, Cassy Harkelman became the first female wrestler to win an Iowa state tournament match in the history of Iowa high school wrestling. She earned a 20-13 pre-tournament record at 112 pounds before receiving an opening-round default at the state tournament. Harkelman was joined by another female wrestler in 2011 as the only female wrestlers to qualify for the state tournament since its inception by the Iowa High School Athletic Association in 1926.

==== State championships ====
- Girls' swimming: 9-time State Champions - 1986, 1993, 1994, 1995, 1996, 1997, 1998, 2003, 2004
- Boys' swimming: 5-time State Champions - 1993, 1998, 2004, 2005, 2006
- Wrestling: 5-time State Champions (all 3A, except 1968) - 1968 (AA), 1976, 1993, 1997, 1998
- Boys' golf: 2022 Class 4A State Champions
- Girls' golf: 4-time State Champions - 1975, 2011(4A), 2016(5A), 2017(5A)
- Boys' cross country: 4-time Class 4A State Champions - 1969, 2004, 2005, 2024
- Boys' basketball: 3-time Class 4A State Champions - 2018, 2019, 2026
- Girls' basketball: 1991 (5v5), 2001 (Class 4A)
- Volleyball: 2-time Class 5A State Champions - 2017, 2019
- Boys' bowling: 2000 Class 2A State Champions (IBPA), 2016 Class 3A State Champions
- Girls' bowling: 1991
- Football: 1986 Class 4A State Champions
- Girls' cross country: 1996 Class 3A State Champions
- Boys' Track and Field: 3-time Class 4A State Champions (2011, 2021,2026)
- Boys' track and field 2022 Wheelchair State Champions
- Girls' track and field: 1995 Indoor State Champions

== Notable alumni ==
- Ike Boettger — NFL player, (Buffalo Bills)
- Jack Campbell — football player Detroit Lions
- A. J. Green — NBA player, (Milwaukee Bucks)
- Gil Gutknecht — former U.S. congressman from Minnesota
- Roger Jepsen — former U.S. Senator
- George Kittle — NFL player, (San Francisco 49ers)
- Michael Mosley — actor
- Ross Pierschbacher — NFL player, (Washington Redskins)
- Matt Wagner, former MLB player, (Seattle Mariners)

== See also ==
- Cedar Falls Community School District
- List of high schools in Iowa

== Sources ==
- Brian C. Collins. Images of America: Cedar Falls, Iowa. Arcadia Publishing, Inc. 1998. ISBN 0-7524-1358-9 ISBN 0-7385-4582-1
