= Harold O. Fischer =

American politician (1917–1991)

Harold O. Fischer (August 4, 1917 — December 15, 1991) was an American politician.

== Early life, military service, and business career ==
Born on August 4, 1917, in Wellsburg, Iowa, to parents John L. Fischer and Grace Huisman, Fischer attended public schools in his hometown before enrolling at the Iowa State Teachers College and later, the AIB College of Business. He subsequently joined Look Magazine as an accountant, and was transferred from Des Moines, Iowa, to New York City in 1940. Fischer joined the United States Army on June 30, 1941, with the rank of private. By the time of his discharge on December 16, 1945, he had been promoted to captain. During his military service, Fischer spent eighteen months overseas providing intelligence to the First Army. Upon his return to Wellsburg, Fischer worked in sales for A. T. McDonald Manufacturing Company and ran a hardware store. He founded his own insurance and real estate agency in 1950, divesting from insurance in 1978 to continue in real estate.

== Political career ==
Fischer was elected to the Iowa House of Representatives for the first time in 1958, and served continuously for District 65 from January 12, 1959, to January 10, 1971. He then served one term each for District 35 and District 38. Throughout his tenure on the Iowa General Assembly, Fischer was affiliated with the Republican Party.

== Personal life and death ==
Fischer married Jean Arthur on July 30, 1942. The couple raised three children. He died of cancer at Grundy County Memorial Hospital in Grundy Center, Iowa, on December 15, 1991.
