= Donna Barry =

American politician (born 1947)

Member of the Iowa House of Representatives from the 82nd district
- In office January 9, 1995 – November 5, 2005

Personal details
- Born: August 30, 1947 (age 79) Harrison County, Iowa, U.S.
- Party: Republican
- Spouse: Lynn
- Children: 2
- Education: University of Northern Iowa
- Occupation: farmer

Donna M. Barry (née Mann; August 30, 1947) is an American politician in the state of Iowa.

Barry was born in Harrison County, Iowa, and attended the University of Northern Iowa. A Republican, she served in the Iowa House of Representatives from 1995 to 2001, representing Iowa's 82nd House of Representatives district.
