= Phil Miller (politician) =

American politician

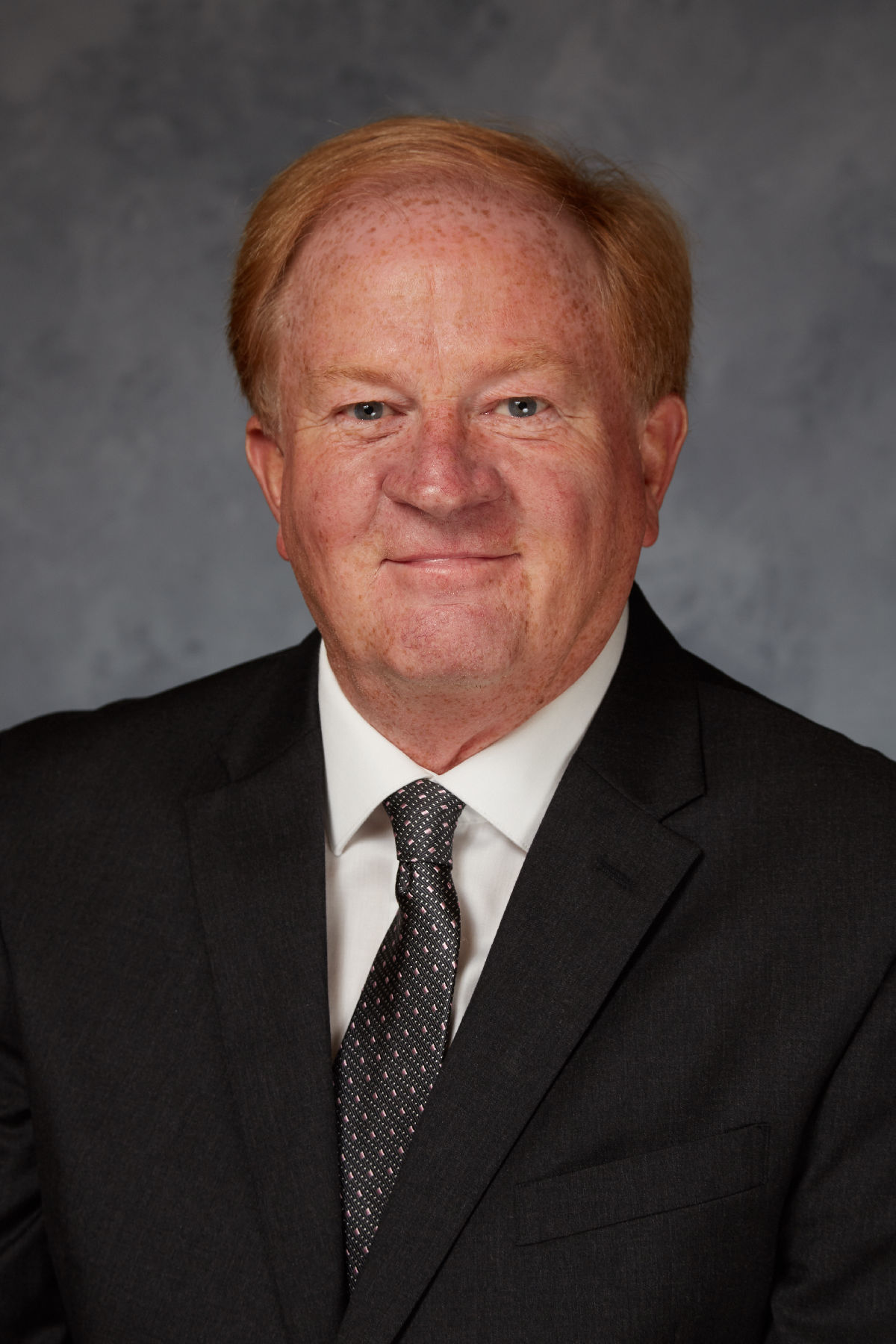

Member of the Iowa House of Representatives from the 82nd district
- In office 2017–2019
- Preceded by: Curt Hanson
- Succeeded by: Jeff Shipley

Personal details
- Born: 1951 or 1952 (age 74–75)
- Party: Democratic
- Spouse: Susan Napier
- Education: Iowa State University
- Profession: Veterinarian

Philip Dean Miller (born c. 1952) is an American politician. He was elected to the Iowa House of Representatives in a special election following the death of Curt Hanson to represent the 82nd district as a member of the Democratic Party. He is a veterinarian with a degree from Iowa State University as well as a member of the Fairfield School Board.
