= Michael Moreland =

American politician and lawyer (born 1962)

Michael J. Moreland (born 9 December 1962) is an American politician and lawyer.

Moreland was born in Ottumwa, Iowa, on 9 December 1962 to John and Mary Moreland. He earned a bachelor's degree from Creighton University and subsequently graduated from the University of Iowa College of Law. Outside of politics, Moreland practiced family law. He ran for the Iowa House of Representatives in 1992 as a Democratic Party candidate, and won the District 93 seat against fellow Ottumwa resident and political independent Jerry Parker. He was unopposed during the 1994 party primaries, and won reelection twice thereafter, serving as a state representative until 1999. During his tenure as a state representative, Moreland discussed penalties for drunk driving and expressed support for tax cuts. In 1996, Moreland served as assistant minority leader.

After stepping down from the state legislature, Moreland led the non-profit Bridge View Center, Inc. Moreland endorsed the Pete Buttigieg 2020 presidential campaign.
