= Phyllis Thede =

American politician (born 1954)

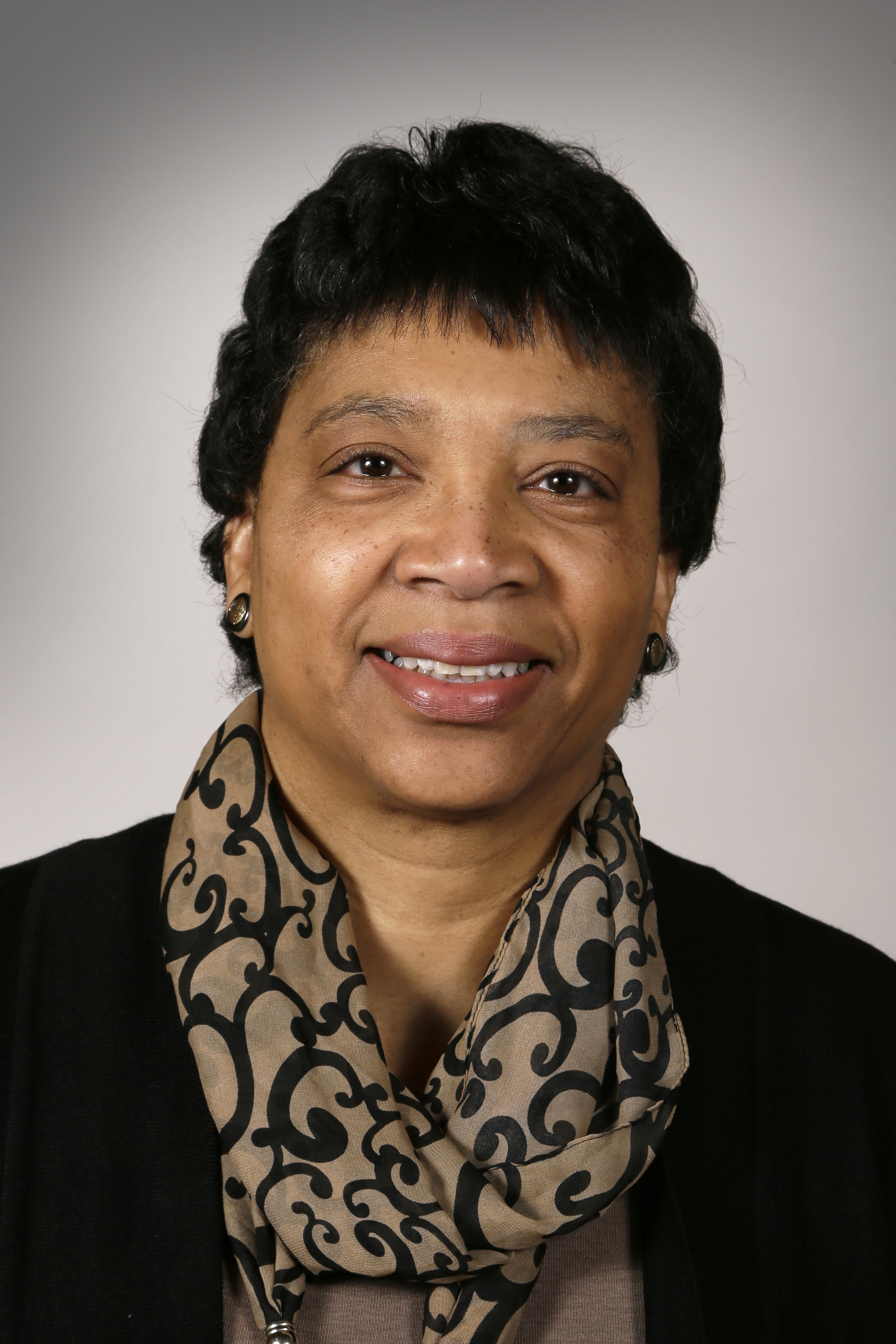

Member of the Iowa House of Representatives from the 93rd district
- In office January 14, 2013 – January 8, 2023
- Succeeded by: Gary Mohr (redistricting)

Member of the Iowa House of Representatives from the 81st district
- In office January 12, 2009 – January 13, 2013
- Preceded by: Jamie Van Fossen

Personal details
- Born: February 23, 1954 (age 72) Chicago, Illinois
- Party: Democratic
- Spouse: Dave Thede
- Children: 3 daughters, including Robin
- Education: Westmar College (B.A.)

Phyllis Thede (born February 23, 1954) is an American former politician who represented the 93rd District in the Iowa House of Representatives as a member of the Iowa Democratic Party. With a background in community education and unions, she was first elected in 2009. She is married and the mother of Robin Thede, a nationally known comedic actress and writer, and two other daughters.

Thede served on several committees in the Iowa House - the Ethics, Local Government, and Natural Resources committees. She also served as the ranking member of the Environmental Protection committee and as a member of the Health and Human Services Appropriations Subcommittee and of the Human Rights Board.

== Early life and education ==
Phyllis Thede was born in 1954 to an African-American family in Chicago, Illinois. Her family moved there from the Deep South in the Great Migration of the early 20th century. Her family later moved to Creston, Iowa, in the southern part of the state, where her father worked on the Burlington Northern Santa Fe (BNSF) railroad, which had established a major division center here, with machine shops and roundhouse.

Phyllis attended local schools and started her higher education at Southwestern Community College. There she met Dave Thede, whom she married in 1974. His family was German-American, with ancestors who immigrated to the US from the 1840s. They moved together to Le Mars, Iowa where they both attended Westmar College.

== Work and family ==
In 1976 Dave graduated and started teaching, and Phyllis also started working in local schools. They had three daughters together, Robin Thede born in Spencer and two younger girls born in Davenport, Iowa, where they lived from 1980 to 2004. Today she and Dave live in Bettendorf and have several grandchildren.

Phyllis Thede has worked in a variety of administrative jobs in the schools, also becoming active in the union. She helped negotiate contracts and advised on grievances.

== Electoral history ==
*incumbent

Election	Political result	Candidate	Party	Votes	%
Iowa House of Representatives elections, 2008; District 81; Turnout: 15,711	Democratic gain from Republican	Phyllis Thede	Democratic	8,736	55.6
Iowa House of Representatives elections, 2008; District 81; Turnout: 15,711	Democratic gain from Republican	Jamie Van Fossen*	Republican	6,951	44.2
Iowa House of Representatives elections, 2010; District 81; Turnout: 10,866	Democratic hold	Phyllis Thede*	Democratic	5,397	49.7
Iowa House of Representatives elections, 2010; District 81; Turnout: 10,866	Democratic hold	Carla Batchelor	Republican	5,164	47.5

Iowa House of Representatives
Preceded by Jamie Van Fossen	81st District; 2009 – 2013	Succeeded by
Preceded by	93rd District; 2013 – 2023	Succeeded by Gary Mohr
