= Lillien Blanche Fearing =

American poet

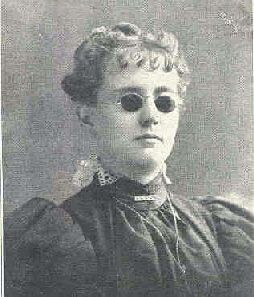
- Born: November 27, 1863; Davenport, Iowa, U.S.
- Died: August 13, 1900 (aged 36); Eureka Springs, Arkansas, U.S.
- Resting place: Forest Home Cemetery
- Occupations: Lawyer, poet

Lillien Blanche Fearing (November 27, 1863 – August 13, 1900) was an American lawyer and poet who was blind.

== Life ==
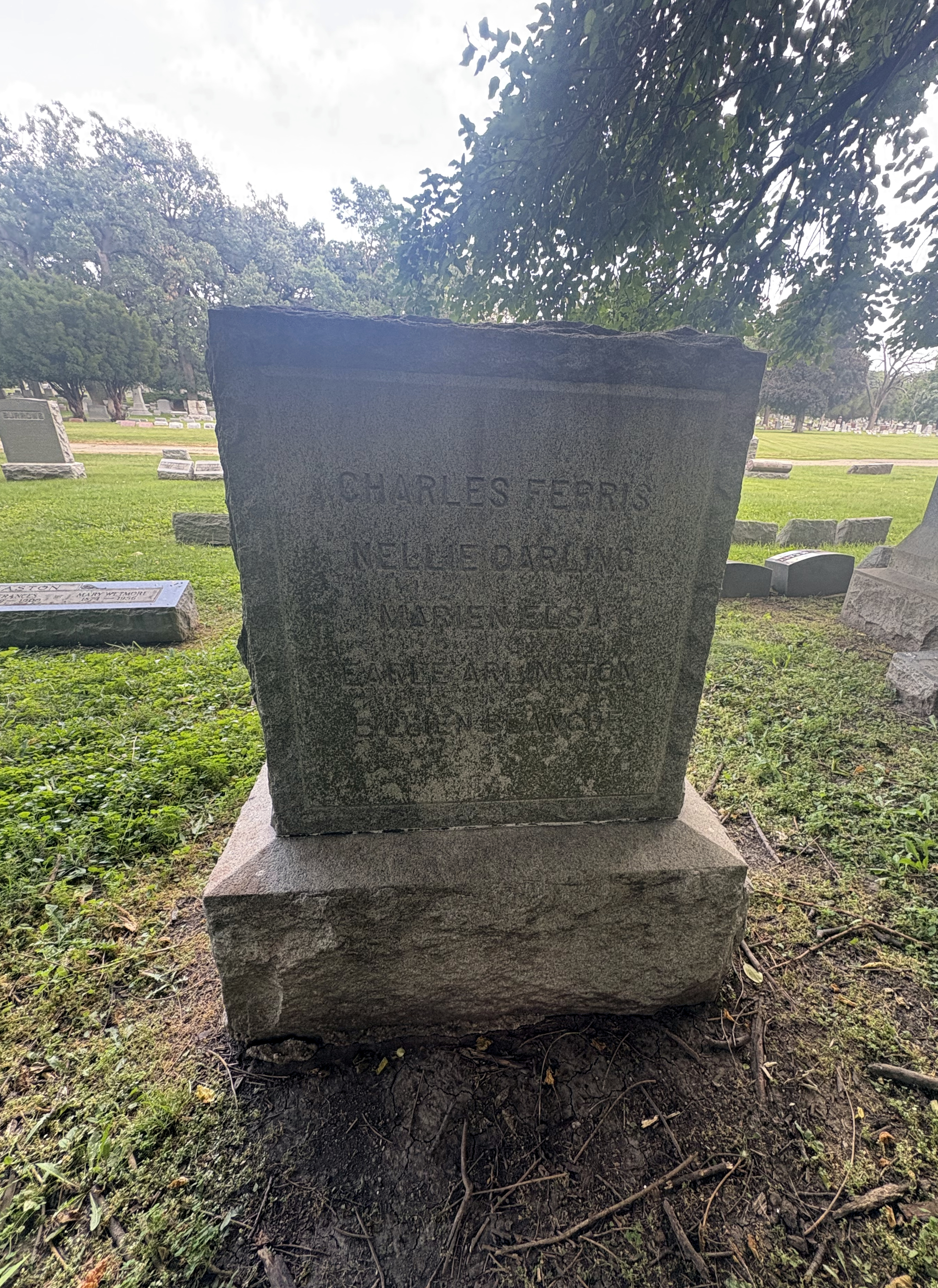
Fearing's grave at Forest Home Cemetery

Fearing was born in Davenport, Iowa in 1863. She lost her sight as the result of an accident whilst playing with other children when she was five or six. She was taught in college in Vinton, Iowa until 1884.

Four years later she moved to Chicago to study at the Union College of Law and graduated in 1890. Her sister and mother served as her amanuensis while she learned, and she became a leading pupil and she also started to write poetry. She was one of four students who shared the scholarship prize when they graduated in 1890. She was the only woman studying law in her year.

She was admitted to the Illinois Bar at Springfield and was able to practice law from her office in Chicago.

She died in Eureka Springs, Arkansas on August 13, 1900, after a long illness. Her final book, Mildred, was published the following year.

She was buried at Forest Home Cemetery in Forest Park, Illinois.

== Works ==
- The Sleeping World, and other Poems (Chicago, 1887)
- In the City by the Lake (Chicago, 1893).
- Roberta (1894)
- Mildred (Chicago, 1901)
