= Bill Royer =

American politician (1929–2018)

Member of the Iowa House of Representatives
- In office 1983–1995

Personal details
- Born: August 29, 1929 Essex, Iowa, United States
- Died: April 2, 2018 (aged 88) Shenandoah, Iowa, United States
- Party: Republican
- Occupation: Realtor

Bill D. Royer (August 29, 1929 - April 2, 2018) was an American politician in the state of Iowa.

Royer was born in Essex, Iowa. He attended Northwest Missouri State University and was a realtor. He served in the Iowa House of Representatives from 1983 to 1995, as a Republican.
