= Curt Hanson =

American politician (1943–2017)

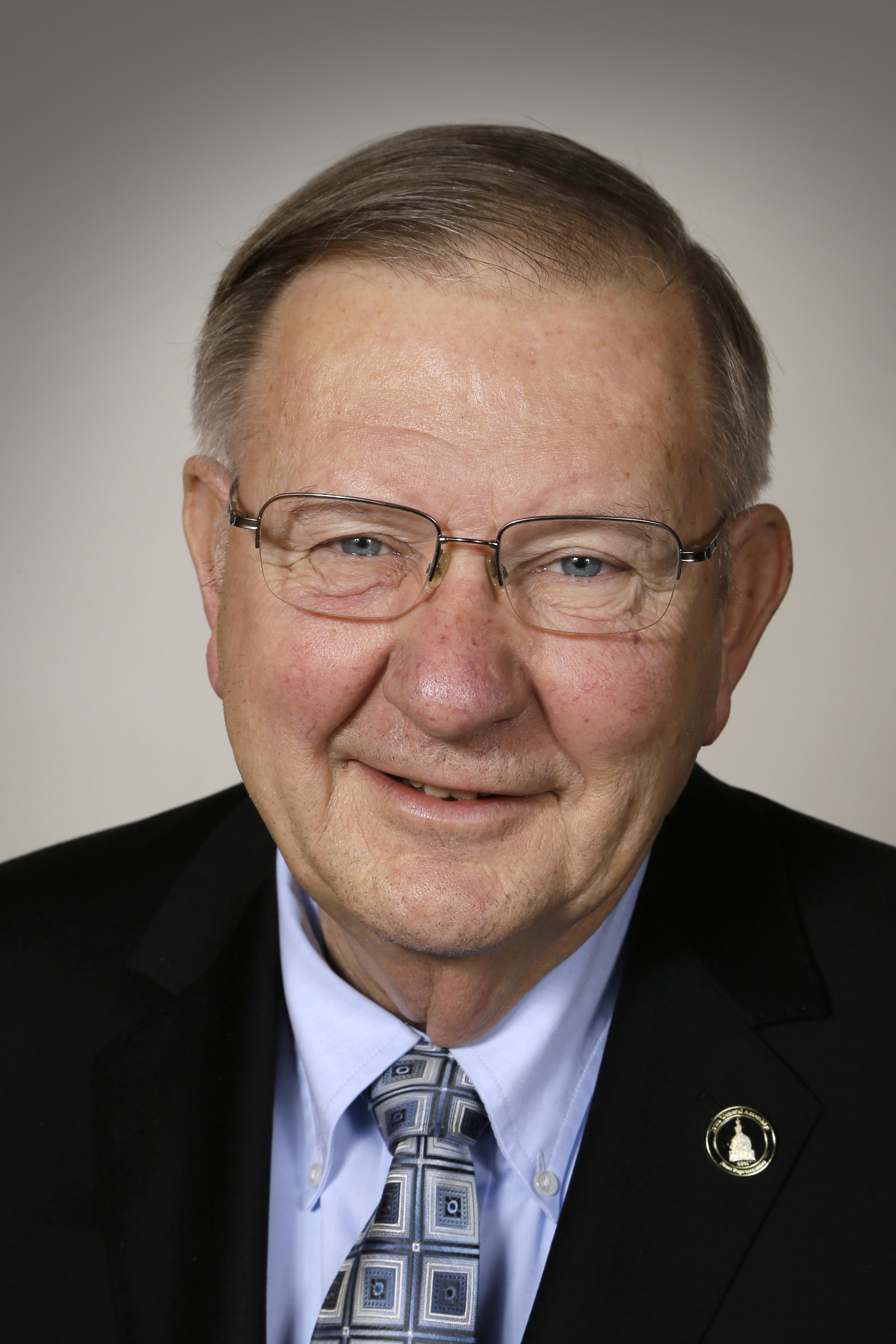

Member of the Iowa House of Representatives from the 82nd district 90th (2009-2013)
- In office September 21, 2009 – June 16, 2017
- Preceded by: John Whitaker
- Succeeded by: Phil Miller

Personal details
- Born: August 13, 1943 Algona, Iowa, U.S.
- Died: June 16, 2017 (aged 73) Fairfield, Iowa, U.S.
- Party: Democratic
- Spouse: Diane
- Children: 2 children
- Education: University of Northern Iowa (B.A.); The University of Iowa (M.A.)
- Occupation: Educator (retired)
- Website: Hanson's website

Curtis Dean Hanson (August 13, 1943 – June 16, 2017) was an American politician. He was born and raised on a Kossuth County, Iowa farm near Swea City. He was also a resident of Fairfield for fifty-two years. Hanson received his B.A. from the University of Northern Iowa and his M.A. from the University of Iowa. He was a driver education teacher at Fairfield High School for forty-three years, where he received the Fairfield Jaycee Outstanding Young Education Award and was named Fairfield Teacher of the Year Award. Hanson also was president of the Iowa Association of Safety Education and a member of the National Education Society.

Hanson was a member of the Iowa House of Representatives. A Democrat, he served in the Iowa House since 2009 representing the 90th and 82nd Districts. On June 16, 2017, he died at the age of 73, from cancer, at his home in Fairfield, Iowa.

Iowa House of Representatives
| Preceded by John Whitaker | 90th District; 2009 – 2013 | Succeeded by Cindy Winckler |
| Preceded by Linda Miller | 82nd District; 2013 – 2017 | Succeeded by TBD |
