= Lillian McElroy =

American politician (1917–2009)

Member of the Iowa House of Representatives from the 97th district
- In office January 8, 1973 – January 9, 1977
- Preceded by: James H. Schwartz
- Succeeded by: William H. Harbor

Member of the Iowa House of Representatives from the 82nd district
- In office January 11, 1971 – January 7, 1973
- Preceded by: Walter W. P. Kruse
- Succeeded by: Thomas J. Higgins

Personal details
- Born: April 28, 1917 Randalia, Iowa
- Died: November 12, 2009 (aged 92) Nebraska City, Nebraska
- Party: Republican

Lillian McElroy (April 28, 1917 – November 12, 2009) was an American politician who served in the Iowa House of Representatives from 1971 to 1977.

She died on November 12, 2009, in Nebraska City, Nebraska at age 92.
