= Dennis Renaud =

American politician (1942–2015)

Dennis L. Renaud (October 25, 1942 – August 13, 2015) was an American politician.

Renaud was born in Des Moines, Iowa, on October 25, 1942, to parents Carroll Yeager and Raymond Renaud. He was raised in Altoona, then enrolled at the Waterloo Barber College in Waterloo from 1960 to 1961. Renaud subsequently returned to Altoona, working as a barber until the 1990s.

From 1969 to 1998, Renaud was a volunteer at the Des Moines Fire Department. He also served on Altoona's chamber of commerce, the centennial committee, and its fire department. Renaud was a member of the Altoona City Council for three years prior to winning his first election to the Iowa House of Representatives. In his first state legislative term, from 1981 to 1983, Renaud held the District 63 seat. He then won reelection to District 78 for five consecutive terms. Between 1993 and 1995, Renaud represented District 66. Throughout his political career, Renaud was affiliated with the Democratic Party.

Renaud and his wife Sue had three children. He died on August 13, 2015.
