= KKHQ =

KKHQ may refer to:

- KKHQ-FM, a radio station (98.5 FM) licensed to serve Cedar Falls, Iowa, United States
- KOEL-FM, a radio station (92.3 FM) licensed to serve Oelwein, Iowa, which held the call sign KKHQ-FM from 2003 to 2020
- KOEL (AM), a radio station (950 AM) licensed to serve Oelwein, Iowa, which held the call sign KKHQ in 2003
- KXAI, a radio station (103.7 FM) licensed to serve Odem, Texas, United States, which held the call sign KKHQ from 1988 to 1996
