= Koel (disambiguation) =

A koel is a bird of genus Eudynamysin the family of cuckoos.

Koel or KOEL may also refer to:

== People ==
- Ditmar Koel (1500s–1563), captain, pirate hunter and Mayor of Hamburg
- Gerard Koel (born 1941), Dutch cyclist
- Koel Mallick (born 1982), Indian film actress
- Koel Purie (born 1978), Indian film actress and TV presenter

== Radio stations ==
- KOEL (AM), licensed to Oelwein, Iowa, U.S.
- KOEL-FM, licensed to Oelwein, Iowa, U.S.
- KKHQ-FM, licensed to Cedar Falls, Iowa, U.S., formerly KOEL and KOEL-FM

== Rivers ==
- South Koel River, in Jharkhand, India, a tributary of the Brahmani River
- North Koel River, in Jharkhand, India, a tributary of the Son River

== See also ==
- De Koel, a multi-purpose stadium in Venlo, Netherlands
- Köl (disambiguation)
- Koyal (disambiguation)
- Kokila (disambiguation)
- Coel, king of Britain
