= Hartman Reserve Nature Center =

Nature reserve in Cedar Falls, Iowa, US

- Shirey Lake in Hartman Reserve Nature Center
- Interactive map of Hartman Reserve Nature Center
- Type: Nature center
- Location: 657 Reserve Dr; Cedar Falls, Iowa
- Coordinates: 42°31′13″N 92°24′42″W
- Area: 308.9 acres (125.0 ha)
- Created: 1938
- Founder: Iowa Watchable Wildlife Site, Important Bird Area, Silos & Smokestacks Natural Heritage Area
- Operator: Black Hawk County Conservation Board
- Hiking trails: Over six miles including the American Discovery Trail
- Other information: Exhibits: Gene and Betty Buckles Program Center and Interpretive Center
- Website: www.hartmanreserve.org

Hartman Reserve Nature Center is a 308.9-acre (1.250 km^{2}) nature reserve located in Cedar Falls, Iowa. The reserve is dedicated to teaching youth about nature through hands on experiences and preservation. It is the largest undisturbed wooded area in Black Hawk County, Iowa and is home to three distinct habitats including wetland, forest, and prairie.

== History ==
Hartman Reserve was named Camp Hartman when it was owned and operated by the YMCA and was only 56 acres (230,000 m^{2}) in size. Hartman Reserve was named after John C. Hartman who was the editor for the Waterloo Daily Courier. Hartman was a nature enthusiast and amateur archaeologist. When the YMCA could not raise the money to buy the property, Hartman donated a sizable amount towards the purchase, enough to have the property bear his name.

The reserve was purchased in 1938 as a camping site for local boys and as a site for use by members of the local YMCA. The camp had a pool, a lodge, cabins and other facilities for overnight and day campers. For various reasons the YMCA decided to sell the camp in 1976. The Black Hawk County Conservation Board purchased 69 acres of the reserve from the YMCA. Eleven acres of Hartman Reserve's lowlands was briefly considered for the US 218 highway, but public opinion helped to push the route north of George Wyth Memorial State Park. The cities of Cedar Falls and Waterloo could not afford to purchase the reserve from the YMCA, so city officials and others encouraged the Black Hawk County Conservation Board to purchase the land in 1976. Additions were later made to the reserve in the lowlands area north of the former railway, now a bike path. This area included two lakes created through sand mining operations and land up to the Cedar River.

Hartman Reserve Nature Center is part of Black Hawk County Conservation. In 2005, Iowa Governor Tom Vilsack signed the Articles of Dedication and designated part of the reserve as the Hartman Bluff State Preserve.

== Fauna ==
=== Plants ===
The Hartman Reserve forest is a mature forest that has many different species of trees that are over 100 years old. There are over 138 different species of plants. Some of the trees would include White Oak, Red Oak, Bur Oak, Hackberry, Walnut, and Sugar Maple. The hackberry, walnut, and sugar maple thrive in the reserve due to the flood plain. Every spring the Cedar River floods into the reserve creating super saturated soils and marsh-like conditions. To control the growth of trees and other vegetation, Hartman Reserve practices controlled burning. They started burning selected parts of the forest in 1999.

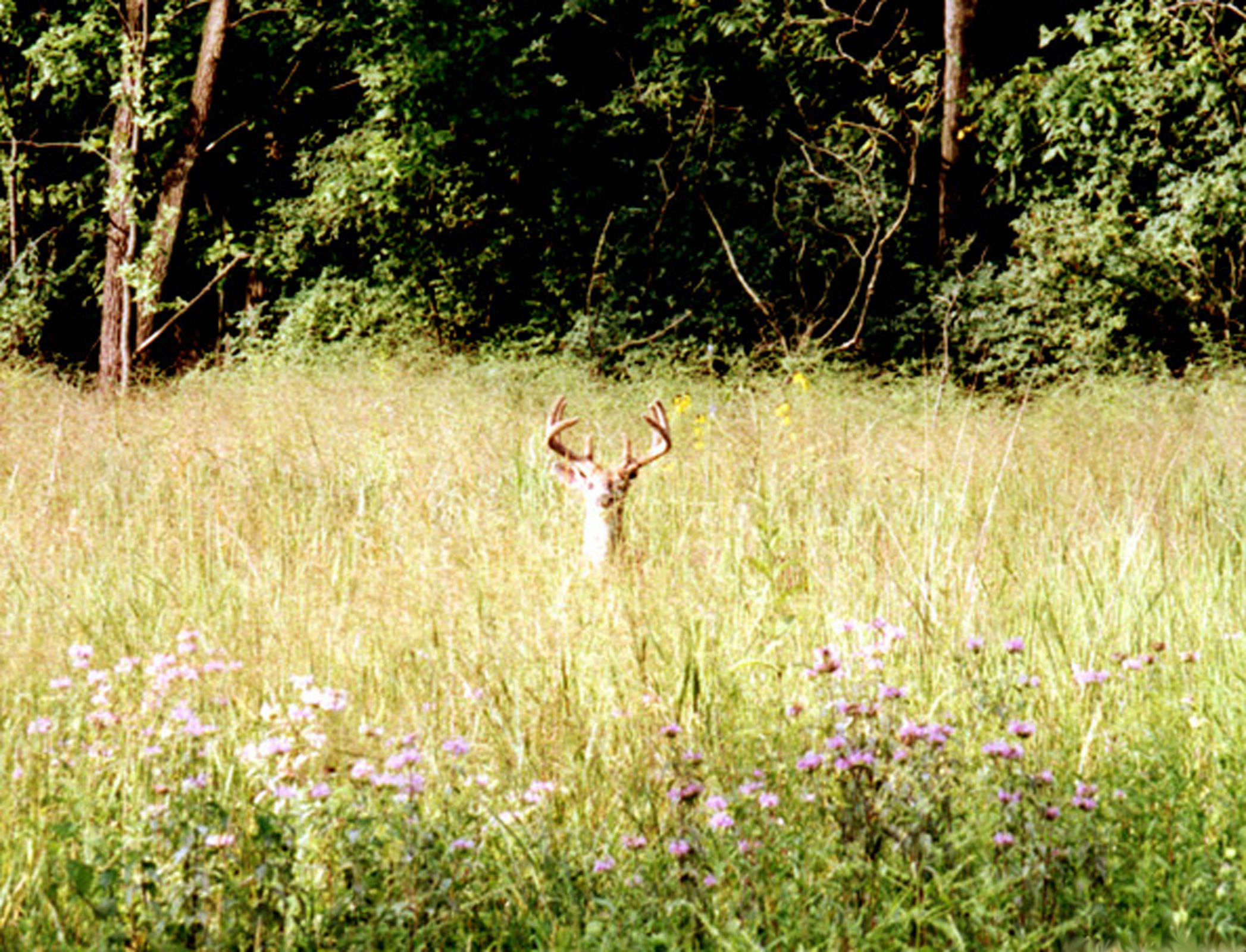
A buck in the Center's prairie region

The current forest is a combination of two earlier forests; xeric and mesic. This is because the Hartman forest is located on part of a bluff and part of a flood plain.

The reserve is also home to a natural prairie. The natural prairie only covers 1-acre (4,000 m^{2}). However, prairie plants have been planted around the Interpretive Center and along the Prairie Trail. Yellow Lady Slipper and Indian Pipe are some of the uncommon flowers that can be found in the prairies and throughout the rest of the reserve.

=== Animals ===
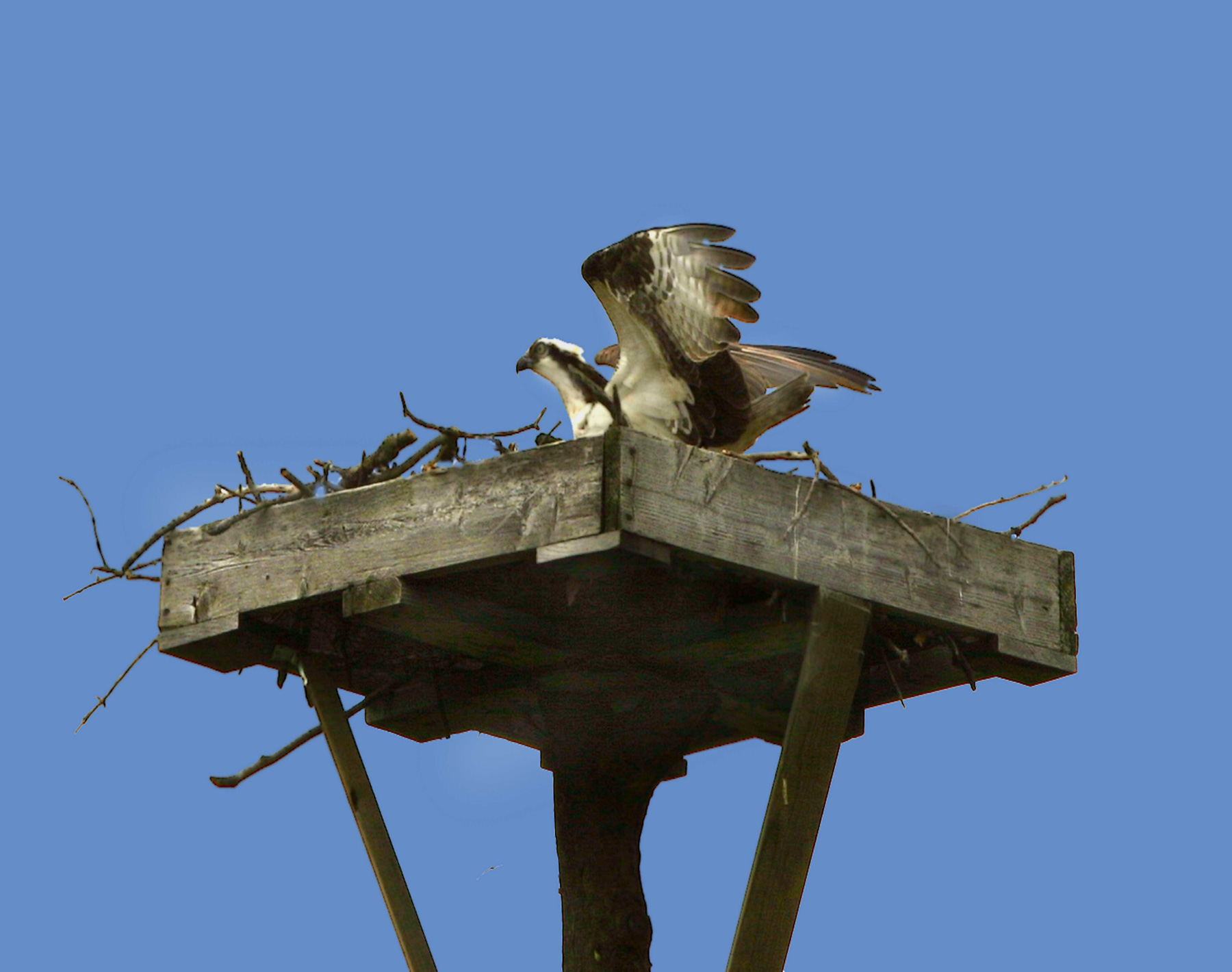
An osprey flying to the Center's osprey habitat

Hartman Reserve has an abundance of animals that can be found throughout the reserve. The most common include white-tailed deer, river otters, turkeys, pileated woodpeckers, red shouldered hawks, foxes, vultures, geese, wood ducks, mallards, ospreys and bald eagles. These animals are native to the reserve except for the otter and osprey, which were first seen on the reserve in 1998 after habitats were created to attract them.

Hunting is illegal on all reserve property without special permission. Starting in 1994, Hartman decided to allow bow hunting during a special season to help keep the deer population under control of the Iowa DNR. The hunters are carefully watched to make sure all of their licenses and tags are legal and that their game was legally harvested. These areas are part of the Deer Management Zone and harvested animals may be checked in at the nature center during regular business hours.

=== Organizations ===
Hartman is recognized by multiple organizations for its abundance of wildlife. Two organizations that recognize the reserve as a great place for birdwatching and animal watching are Iowa Watchable Wildlife Site and Important Bird Area. Hartman Reserve also partners with the national education program Silos and Smokestacks National Heritage Area. When Hartman was bought in 1976, 46 acres (190,000 m^{2}) of land was set aside to form the Hartman Bluff State Reserve, which is now certified by Iowa DNR Preserves Board as a natural forest and prairie.

== Maple syrup ==
Hartman has been collecting sap from maple trees since 1985. The sap is collected starting at the end of February and throughout March. The sap is then boiled down to produce maple syrup in the Sugar Shack, which is located on the reserve. The syrup is then stored and used during Hartman's annual Maple Syrup Festival. The Maple Syrup Festival is a pancake breakfast that raises money for Hartman Reserve.

== Trails and buildings ==
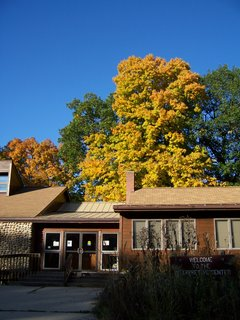
The interpretive center

Hartman Reserve is home to many trails including paved, unpaved, and water. There are over 6 miles (9.7 km) worth of walking trails. The most notorious of these trails is the American Discovery Trail. All of the water trails lead into the Cedar River, George Wyth Memorial State Park, and the many lakes on the reserve. The walking trails are dispersed throughout the reserve with varying levels of difficulties. During the winter, snowshoe trails are available that replace the regular walking trails. The trails can be used anyday between sunrise and sunset

The Gene and Betty Buckles Program Center is an environmentally friendly building. All of the material used to build and furnish the building is made from recycled materials. The floor of the porch is made from recycled tires. The building structure is used from recycled telephone poles and recycled paper. The carpet is made from recycled pop bottles and all of the lightbulbs are fluorescent and approved to be eco-friendly. The building is used for programs that are sponsored by Hartman and are also available to rent.

The Interpretive Center is the main building. There are year-round exhibits that include the history of Hartman and live animals that can be found on the Reserve. The main office is also located in the Interpretive Center where visitors can rent snowshoes during the winter. Both buildings are open Monday - Friday 8:30 am to 4:30 pm and Sunday 1:00 pm to 5:00 pm.

== See also ==
- Hartman Reserve Nature Center trail map
