= Ferner Nuhn =

American author, literary critic and artist

Ferner Nuhn (July 25, 1903 – April 15, 1989) was an American writer, literary critic, and artist born in Cedar Falls, Iowa, the son of William C. and Anna R. Nuhn. He described his background as Middle Western of mixed German, Swiss and Pennsylvania Dutch ancestry. He lived in various sections of the country, from California to Vermont, and married noted Iowa writer Ruth Suckow in 1929. He was a literary critic, teacher, writer, and artist; he and his wife were both active in the Quakers and part of the Conscientious Objectors movement in World War II. After his wife's death, in 1960, he worked to preserve her literary legacy, founded the Ruth Suckow Memorial Association, remarried Georgeanna (Georgia) Washburn Dafoe, and taught at Claremont College before retiring. He died in 1989 after the death of his second wife, and is buried beside Ruth in Greenwood Cemetery in Cedar Falls, Iowa.

== Early life ==
Nuhn attended Lincoln School through fourth grade, Jefferson (or West) School through sixth and Lincoln again through eighth grade. He graduated from Cedar Falls High School with the class of 1920. Local Historian Dorothy Grant describes his family this way: his father was in banking and real estate while his mother was a homemaker. He had two siblings: Marjorie and Hilde.

He attended North Central College in Naperville, Illinois, graduating with a B.A. in 1924; he described discovering that he liked English literature during this period of time. His uncle, Dr. Edwin Roll, was the President of North Central College at this time.

He received a fellowship and went on to study at the University of Illinois, where he received an M.A. in English Literature in 1925. He also took several courses at Iowa State Teachers College. Later he taught freshman rhetoric at Urbana. During that time he discovered contemporary American poetry as well as fiction, and especially admired Robert Frost, Carl Sandburg and Vachel Lindsay.

== Writing career begins ==
Nuhn drove a Yellow Cab in Chicago and used the pseudonym of Yellow to contribute a number of items to the Daily News column run by Keith Preston. He enrolled at Columbia University graduate school, with the idea of continuing an academic career, which ended when H. L. Mencken accepted one of his stories for the American Mercury. Dorothy Grant says that Nuhn said, “I decided I already knew too much,” and stopped taking classes to have more time to write. This led to the publication of a number of stories, reviews, and articles in The New Yorker, The Nation, The New Republic, The American Mercury, The Christian Century, and other magazines, especially Quaker publications.

Nuhn had been reading the work of Ruth Suckow when, in August 1926, he visited her in Earlville, Iowa. Ruth kept eighty hives of bees in an apiary there while establishing herself as a writer. Dorothy Grant writes that Nuhn described their meeting when he helped to dedicate the Ruth Suckow Memorial Park in Earlville in 1982. He had driven to Earlville from Cedar Falls, they had a long afternoon of good conversation, and then they were invited to a chicken dinner at a neighbor's house. They enjoyed discussing literature, among other topics.

Rebecca Christian wrote a one-woman play about Ruth Suckow, called “Just Suppose,” and to prepare for it, read much of the correspondence of Suckow and Nuhn, now housed in the Special Collections of the University of Iowa’s library, where it fills 56 boxes. Christian wrote, “During this period (of bee keeping) a letter arrived from a young literary critic in Cedar Falls who asked for ‘disposition towards pilgrims visiting you: if or when you are at ‘home.’” She apparently said yes, because he drove his Model T to Earlville, beginning a relationship that lasted both of their lives.

When they met, Ruth was 36 and Nuhn was 25: the age difference did not seem to bother him, but troubled her at first. They shared a love of cats, and Nuhn once playfully compared Ruth to his cat, Persephone, telling her that he wasn't afraid of her sharp claws: "...both of you have sharp claws, though neither of you use them much,"

Nuhn and Suckow continued their friendship in New York City, where he attended Columbia University graduate school. His interest in writing was encouraged by the publication of several stories in The American Mercury, edited by H. L. Mencken, in 1927-28.

== Marriage and travels ==
Nuhn and Suckow were married in San Diego, California on March 11, 1929. Ruth wrote to her aunt, “We start out with several things in our disfavor, but a very great deal of love in our favor.” An observer said, “Ferner found an artist who could translate the Midwest, and in Ferner, Ruth found a critic who could understand the translation.”

Rebecca Christian describes the next seven years of Nuhn and Ruth's lives together by saying that they traveled extensively: “roosting and writing in cabins, ramshackle old houses or writers’ colonies in places such as the Iowa Mississippi river town of McGregor; northern Minnesota; Des Moines; the MacDowell Colony at Peterborough, N. H.; and Washington, D. C. They also visited the writers’ retreat, Yaddo in Saratoga Springs, where Suckow hated the pretentious atmosphere of artsy largesse from people ‘rotten with money’ but loved the quiet and the food.” At Yaddo, each writer had a small cabin and meals were brought on a tray and left at the door, so they could focus on their writing.

At the MacDowell Colony, in Peterborough, New Hampshire, Nuhn began a series of oil character sketches he later called “Figures of the Thirties.” They included John Cowper Powys, Charles Wakefield Cadman, Robert Frost, Henry Wallace – and Charles Hearst, of Cedar Falls, The collection has been exhibited at the University of Northern Iowa. Dorothy Grant provides a more extensive explanation: Ruth and Ferner were at a writers’ workshop when he decided to sketch some of the people in the group. He wrote comments about the people he had sketched, and made copies of the booklet. Eventually, copies of the booklet were given to the Hearst Center, while the original is in the Special Collections Department at the University of Iowa library in Iowa City.

Nuhn's collection of sketches showed his interest in people and their occupations. He wrote, “Most of the persons portrayed in this collection were fellow colonists of myself and my wife, Ruth Suckow, in the early 1930s, at Yaddo, the art colony near Saratoga Spring, New York....Included in the list are the names of some nationally-known artists, playwrights, poets, essayists, composers, and novelists as well as the name of Henry A. Wallace, who is described as “Agriculturist, Author, Statesman.” Dorothy Grant notes that the collection provides valuable insights into the political scene as well as the Arts during the 1930s.

Others on the list of people he sketched include:

- William Rose Benet—poet and playwright
- Charles Wakefield Cadman—composer
- Carl Carmer—novelist, editor, and conservationist
- Leo Fisher—sculptor
- Felix Fox—composer
- Frances Frost—poet, fiction writer
- Robert Frost—poet
- Horace Gregory—poet, critic, and editor
- Albert Halper—novelist
- Roy Harris—composer
- Charles Hearst—Iowa farmer
- Jeffrey Levy—painter
- John Cowper Powys—novelist, poet, essayist
- Evelyn Scott—poet, novelist
- Ruth Suckow—novelist
- John Brooks Wheelwright—poet, critic
- Henry A. Wallace—agriculturist, author, statesman

Two other paintings remain of Nuhn's, now housed at the Ruth Suckow Library in Earlville. One is of Ruth's cottage, while the other one shows one of their cats (always white). Nuhn also designed a bookplate for Ruth, including a cat.

Nuhn wrote for a number of publications, including The Nation; one of his articles is available online. He describes witnessing a forced farm sale in Iowa in the 1930s. The article begins with the comment that “Some may think of farmers as conservative, but that view ignores a long tradition of rural radicalism in the United States. In the early years of the Great Depression, that radicalism found powerful expression in the subverting of farm foreclosures and tax sales. The technique was simple—when a farm was foreclosed for overdue taxes or failure to meet mortgage payments, neighbors would show up at the auction and intimidate any potential buyers. Then the farm and equipment would be purchased at a token price and returned to the original owner.”

In 1934 Nuhn was invited to Washington, D. C. to work as a writer in the Agricultural Adjustment Administration under Henry A. Wallace. He served there for two years, enjoying learning something about the workings of the federal government. During part of this time he worked with Henry Wallace in the writing of Wallace's book, Whose Constitution.

In the fall of 1936, Nuhn and Ruth returned to Cedar Falls because his father was sick. They lived at 2215 Grand Boulevard until 1942, then at 1223 West Second Street. Nuhn helped his father manage his business property. On the death of his father, Nuhn continued in this role.

Nuhn and Ruth were both active in the community and enjoyed being part of the literary and social life of Cedar Falls. Dorothy and Martin Grant became acquainted with Ruth and Nuhn at this time. The two couples were part of a circle of friends who enjoyed many dinners and “fun and game” evenings. Furthermore, she writes that Ruth and Nuhn enjoyed watching the Waterloo, Cedar Falls, and Northern Trolley (W. C. F. & N.) trundle by. They rode it often and became such familiar passengers that the motorman would let them off right in front of their house rather than at the regular corner.

Nuhn was interested in art, Dorothy writes, because his sister Marjorie was a talented artist. He founded the Cedar Falls Art League in the early 1940s and his mother, Anna, let him have a large upstairs room over the Miller Shoe store at 319 1/2 Main Street for the exhibits. This was an active organization, offering art classes for children and adults, displaying artwork in exhibits, and sponsoring receptions. Nuhn was its president for six years: Dorothy and her husband were charter members. The organization sought to encourage the showing and purchase of original paintings and other art by local and area artists. The present Hearst Center for the Arts grew out of that earlier organization. Nuhn came back to Cedar Falls to exhibit his sister Marjorie's paintings in the old downtown high school. Marjorie was already in a nursing home, but appreciated his efforts. Dorothy remembers that Nuhn was a fine host and that he gave all of her remaining paintings to the Hearst Center, along with money for the Marjorie Nuhn Conservation Room.

Dorothy Grant also notes that Nuhn enjoyed carpentry work and built a solid walnut desk for Ruth while they lived in Cedar Falls; she used the desk until they moved to Arizona. Later, the Grants purchased the desk in 1949 and donated it to the Ruth Suckow Memorial Library in Earlville in 1991.

While living in Cedar Falls, Nuhn helped found the Supper Club, sometimes called The No Name Club, or Town and Gown. Dorothy S. Grant, wife of one of the other founders, Martin, describes it this way in her self-published booklet, The Cedar Falls Supper Club (June 1993). Not very long after Bill Reninger's arrival in Cedar Falls, he and Jim Hearst, Paul Diamond, and Ferner Nuhn talked about organizing a discussion type club. By the fall of 1940, basic plans had been put together. There would be twelve members, half town, half Gown, with a wide range of interests. Meetings would be once a month in a place where a meal would be served in a private room. There would be a minimum of business, with no officers except a secretary who notified the members of the coming meeting, requested, and made reservations for the dinner. Each member would be assigned a certain month to give his paper and be responsible to inform the secretary of the title.

Dorothy later describes Nuhn's first talk, by recounting an interview done with Iver Christofferson, then 94. He remembered Nuhn's talk as one of the most controversial Iver experienced in his years in Supper Club. Nuhn talked about Conscientious Objectors.

This certainly fits with what we know about his wife, Ruth Suckow. Rebecca Christian writes that Suckow established contact with the conscientious objectors to World War II in 1943. (She had found World War I profoundly disturbing and her relationship with her father had been damaged by his activities supporting the war.) In 1944 she traveled to the West Coast to visit six Civilian Public Service camps and one mental hospital. She spoke on writing and literature, read manuscripts, and encouraged young men.

Over the years Nuhn published work in a number of magazines, including The American Mercury, The Nation, New Republic, Christian Century, New Yorker, and other magazines. In 1942, Harper Brothers published his critical work, The Wind Blew from the East: a study in the orientation of American culture. It was reprinted in 1967 by Kennikat Press.

== Retirement to California and death ==
In 1947, because of Ruth's health problems, Nuhn and Ruth moved to Tucson, Arizona; Ruth had rheumatoid arthritis, while Nuhn had asthma and allergies, so they hoped to find relief in a warmer climate. Later, in 1952, they moved to Claremont, California. They lived in a small house at 420 West 8th Street and were active in the Society of Friends (Quakers). They returned to Iowa for visits.

Nuhn taught at Claremont College in California. Ruth continued to write until her death, on January 23, 1960. After Ruth's death, Nuhn remained active with the Claremont Religious Society of Friends. He wrote for Quaker periodicals and published several booklets on various topics relating to the Quaker faith, including Friends and the Ecumenical Movement (Philadelphia, 1970). He also worked to ensure that his wife's literary legacy would remain strong; in 1964 the Earlville Library was renamed the Earlville-Ruth Suckow Memorial library, in the community where they had first met.

Nuhn married Georgeanna (Georgia) Washburn Dafoe, who was a cousin of Ruth Suckow, in 1965. Her husband had died a decade earlier. The following year, 1966, he and Georgia worked with a group of people to form the Ruth Suckow Memorial Association (RSMA). Nuhn and Georgia gathered and organized Ruth's papers and donated them to the Special Collections at the University of Iowa. Georgia also created an exhibit for the Suckow Library in Earlville, donated a bookcase from Ruth's Father, and helped gather mementos to display in a glass case.

Georgia led the efforts to preserve the cottage where Ruth once kept her bees and wrote; however, the structure was not in good condition, so the decision was made to tear it down and create a park in its place. So, in 1982 the RSMA established the Ruth Suckow Park in Earlville at the site of her former home. Nuhn and Georgia spoke at the dedication ceremony, held on June 12. It was Georgia's last visit to Earlville. She died May 28, 1984, and Nuhn wrote a moving tribute to her life and work in the Fall 1984 issue of the Ruth Suckow newsletter. He remembered her role in the efforts to establish the park: "The event was a fitting climax to Georgia's long labor of love in memory of Ruth Suckow."

Two years after Georgia's death, Nuhn moved to the Santa Rosa retirement facility in 1986. Three years later, at age 85, he died—on April 15, 1989, having been in frail health for some time. There was a local memorial service. His body was then sent to Cedar Falls, Iowa so that he could be buried next to his beloved wife, Ruth, in Greenwood Cemetery in Cedar Falls, Iowa. However, it was not until 2009 that a headstone was erected to mark the spot; members of the Ruth Suckow Memorial Association worked with his remaining family members to correct the oversight. Ruth is now buried between the two men who so strongly influenced her: her father, William Suckow, and her husband, Ferner Nuhn.

== Literary legacy ==
While Nuhn was not the prolific writer that Ruth was, he was a critic, scholar and accomplished writer. He captured the plight of the Midwestern farmers during the Great Depression in his essay for the Nation about farm sales. In addition, he is credited with writing about the Society of Friends (Quakers). Furthermore, without his efforts to establish the Ruth Suckow Memorial Association and related activities to reprint some of her books, it is not certain that the current generation of readers would be able to read some of Ruth Suckow's books.

Two of Suckow's earlier books were reprinted, largely due to his advocacy and the establishment of the Ruth Suckow Memorial Association. The University of Iowa Press, in Iowa City, Iowa released The Folks (1992) and New Hope (1998). In addition, A Ruth Suckow Omnibus came out in 1988; this contained eleven of her short stories. It also included an introductory essay by Suckow Scholar Clarence A. Andrews, a longtime member of the RSMA.

In addition, he wrote several booklets published by Historical Societies and the Quakers.
