= Gertrude Tressel Rider =

American librarian (1876–1968)

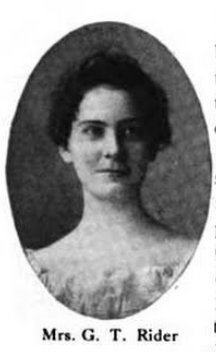
Gertrude Tressel Rider, from a 1916 publication.

Gertrude Tressel Rider Harpham (April 22, 1876 — March 13, 1968) was an American librarian who specialized in building collections of braille materials, especially for blind disabled veterans, in the 1920s.

== Early life ==
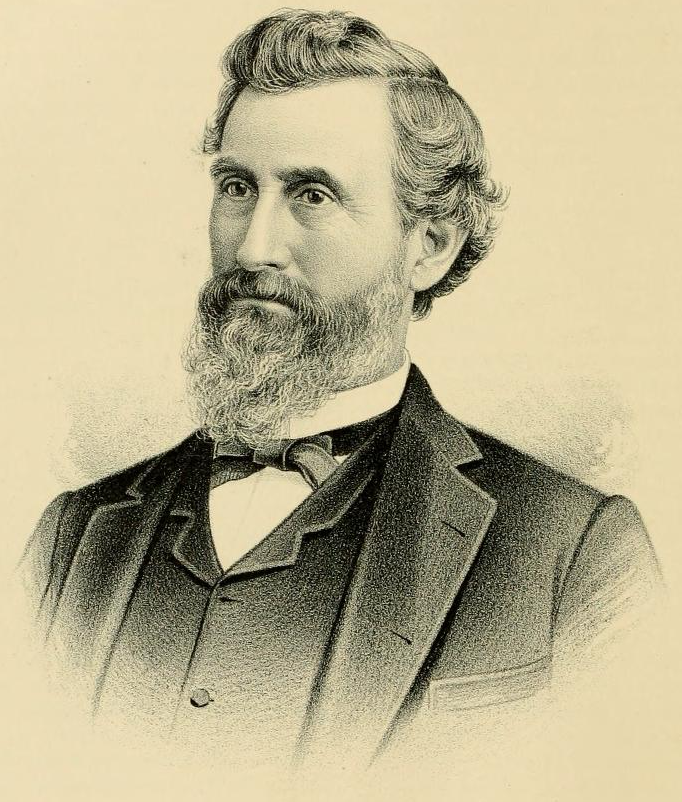
Dr. John Harsh Tressel in 1892 publication

Gertrude H. H. Tressel was from Alliance, Ohio, the daughter of Susanna Teegarden (née Hawkins) and Dr. John Harsh Tressel. Her father was a medical doctor and Union veteran of the American Civil War. She attended Mount Union College, where she studied music, and Bryn Mawr College, where she earned a bachelor's degree in 1902.

== Career ==
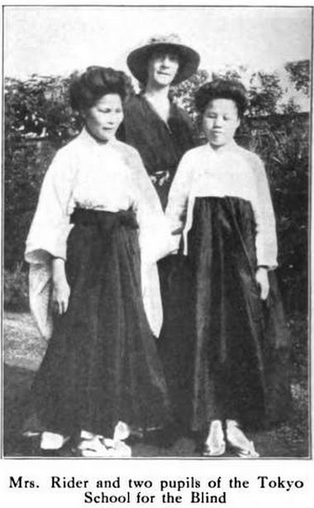
Gertrude Tressel Rider in Japan in 1915, with two blind students.

Gertrude Rider chaired the "Work with the Blind" committee of the American Library Association, and was the Librarian for the Blind at the Library of Congress from 1912 to 1925. Overlapping that work, she was also National Director of Braille for the American Red Cross from 1923 to 1925, encouraging volunteers to learn how to hand-transcribe books into braille, and setting standards for that work. Her particular interest was in meeting the literacy needs of blind disabled veterans of World War I, with braille materials and training. She testified about the circulation of books for the blind in front of the Post Office and Post Roads Committee of the House of Representatives in 1922.

Gertrude T. Rider studied blind education in Japan, including libraries, during a visit to that country in 1915, and published an article about that work in Outlook for the Blind. Publications by Gertrude Rider included Braille Transcribing: A Manual (1925, in collaboration with Adelia M. Hoyt).

== Personal life ==
Gertrude Tressel married twice. She wed Rev. Harold Milof Rider in 1902. They had a son, Theodore Harold Rider (1903–1955), before Harold died in 1911. Her second husband was Fred Murcott Harpham; they married in 1925. Because Fred Harpham was vice president of Goodyear Tire and Rubber Company, Gertrude Harpham christened the ill-fated Goodyear Blimp "Columbia" in a 1931 ceremony, and was aboard for its maiden flight.

Gertrude was widowed again when Fred Harpham died in 1934. In widowhood, Gertrude Harpham enjoyed traveling, including a 1947 trip to Guatemala and the Yucatán, to South Africa in 1949, and to India in 1950. She also served a term as president of the Akron Garden Club, in 1949–1950. She died in 1968, aged 91 years, in Lake Wales, Florida. Records of Rider's work with the American Library Association are in that organization's archives at the University of Illinois.
