= Leland Sage =

American history professor (1899–1989)

Leland Livingston Sage (April 23, 1899 – February 16, 1989) was an American professor emeritus of history at the University of Northern Iowa. He was deeply interested in Iowa history, and wrote two books on it, both of which won national recognition from the American Association for State and Local History. In 1983, Sage was awarded the honorary degree of Doctor of Humane Letters.

== Early life ==
Born in Magnolia, Arkansas, to Jesse A. and Mary C. (Livingston) Sage, Sage earned his Bachelor of Arts degree in history at Vanderbilt University in 1922, and was awarded the Master of Arts (1928) and Doctor of Philosophy degrees (1932), both at the University of Illinois at Urbana-Champaign.

== Teaching career ==
He taught for three years in high schools at Camden, Arkansas, and Taylorville, Illinois. From 1928 to 1930, he taught history at DePauw University. While on the faculty of DePauw, he met Margaret Pearson, who was teaching music there. They were married on December 30, 1929, in Bedford, Indiana, and had one daughter, Carolyn Sage Robinson. He was preceded in death by both his wife and daughter.

Sage taught various courses in European history at the University of Northern Iowa in 1932, but soon developed a strong interest in Iowa history. His first book, published in 1956, was "William Boyd Allison: A Study in Practical Politics," which tracked the career of an influential Iowan in the U.S. Senate at the turn of the century. Well received and reviewed, it was followed by another book, "A History of Iowa," which was published in 1974 by the Iowa State University Press. This effort also gained favorable response. Each book won national recognition in the form of the Award of Merit from the American Association for State and Local History. He also contributed a large number of reviews and articles in a wide variety of specialties within European and American history. In December 1987, he appeared on a program sponsored by the Illinois State Historical Society.

== Retirement ==
Sage took what was then mandatory retirement at age 68 in 1967. But the pace of his career never slackened. He continued to offer a course, usually in Iowa history, on campus during the many semesters until 1981, and directed students via correspondence study until 1986. He was honored by his colleagues in the autumn of 1982 for completing fifty years of continuous service. At the ceremony, he was praised for his ability to relate local and state history to the national and international settings. His colleagues and former students planted a maple tree with a plaque, honoring him in 1984. As far as can be determined, he holds the all-time record for continuous service at the University of Northern Iowa (1932–1986).

== Honorary degree ==
At the May 1983 commencement ceremony of the University of Northern Iowa, Sage was awarded an honorary Doctor of Humane Letters degree. at which time, the citation praised him as scholar, teacher, and humanist, who shared with his class of grateful students all over the nation, eager to broaden their history knowledge. He was respected and admired as a model teacher-scholar.

== Personal life ==
In the community, Sage and his wife were well known for their performances in vocal music, among other activities. He was also a President of the Cedar Falls Rotary Club and President of the Cedar Falls Historical Society. During 1977–1981, he served on the Iowa State Historical Board, including a term as its president. Sage was recognized in 1985 for his services and achievements with an award from Governor Terry Branstad.

In the spring of 1988, as he prepared for the move to Iowa City, colleagues and friends praised Sage as an urbane gentleman, who even then sought new academic challenges in the form of additional research and writing from the holdings of the State Historical Society. They added, too, that at state and national history meetings, numerous inquiries continued to be directed toward his writings and well-being. Sage was engaged in the writing of several projects at the time of his death in 1989, at age 89.
