= KCRR =

Radio station in Grundy Center, Iowa

Coordinates: 42.391°N 92.533°W

- Grundy Center, Iowa; United States
- Broadcast area: Waterloo-Cedar Falls
- Frequency: 97.7 MHz
- Branding: 97.7 KCRR

Programming
- Format: Classic rock
- Affiliations: Compass Media Networks

Ownership
- Owner: Townsquare Media; (Townsquare License, LLC)
- Sister stations: KKHQ-FM, KOEL, KOEL-FM

History
- First air date: 1983 (as KGCI)
- Former call signs: KGCI (1983–1995)
- Call sign meaning: "Classic Rock Radio"

Technical information
- Licensing authority: FCC
- Facility ID: 25471
- Class: C3
- ERP: 16,000 watts
- HAAT: 124 meters (407 ft)

Links
- Public license information: Public file; LMS
- Webcast: Listen Live
- Website: kcrr.com

KCRR (97.7 FM) is a radio station in Iowa serving Waterloo, Cedar Falls, and surrounding cities with a classic rock format. The station is owned by Townsquare Media. Studios are located in Waterloo, while its transmitter is located west of Hudson.

Elwin Huffman serves as morning news host. KCRR carries the Dwyer and Michaels Morning Show from Quad Cities sister station WXLP.

== History ==
Signing on in 1983 as KGCI, and targeting Grundy County, the station changed from adult contemporary to country in November 1993. KGCI flipped to classic rock, and the KCRR call letters, on February 17, 1995.

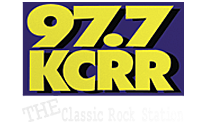
Logo under previous slogan

On August 30, 2013, a deal was announced in which Townsquare Media would acquire 53 Cumulus stations, including KCRR, for $238 million. The deal was part of Cumulus' acquisition of Dial Global; Townsquare and Dial Global are both controlled by Oaktree Capital Management. The sale to Townsquare was completed on November 14, 2013; KCRR was one of three stations (along with KKHQ-FM and KOEL-FM) that were placed in a divestiture trust for eventual resale within two years. In December 2016, the Federal Communications Commission approved Townsquare's request to reacquire the stations from the divestiture trust.
