= Cedar Falls Utilities =

American utility company

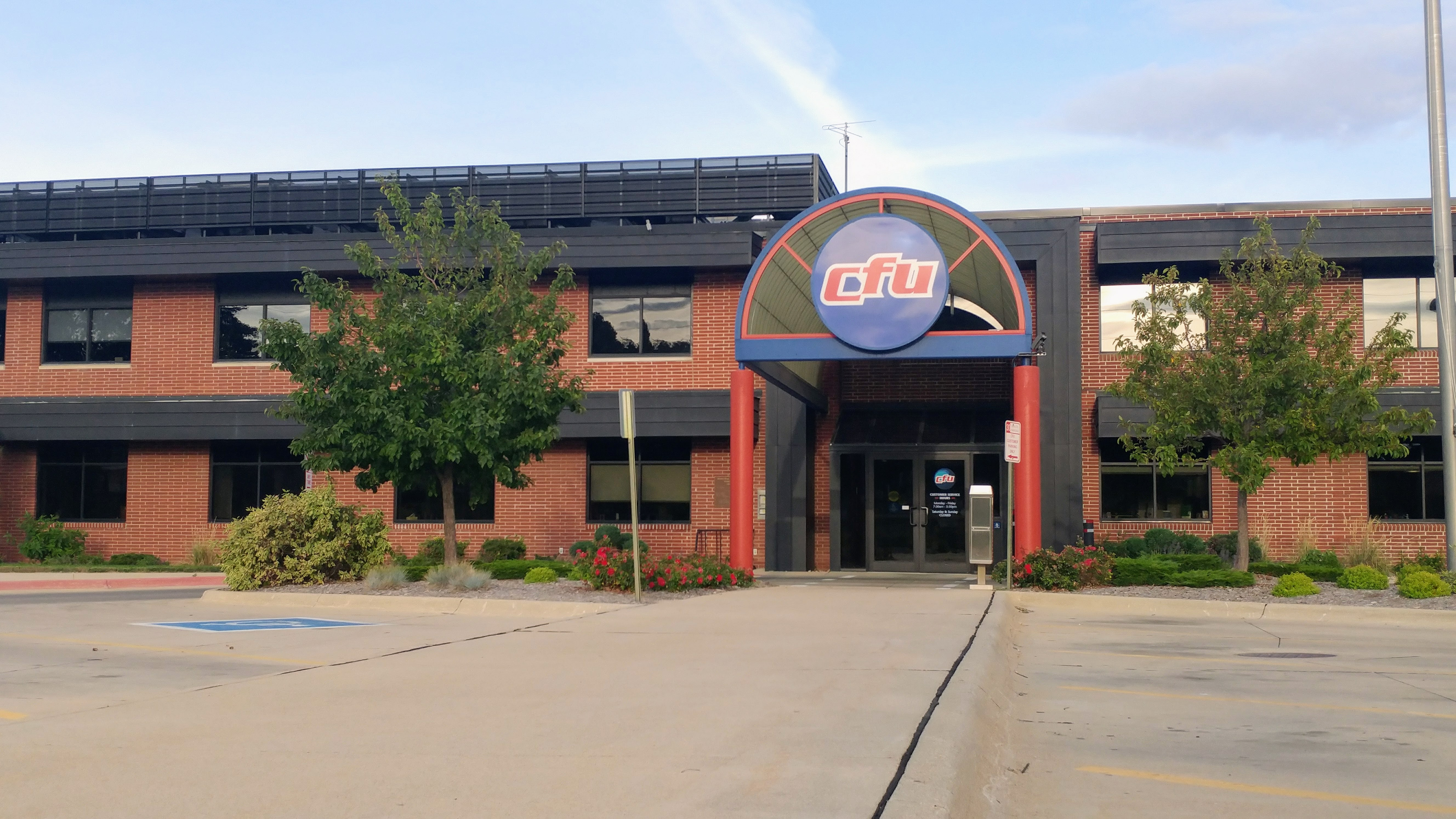
- CFU Main Entrance
- Company type: Municipally Owned Corporation
- Industry: Public Utility
- Founded: 1888
- Area served: Cedar Falls, Iowa
- Key people: Steve Bernard (General Manager)
- Products: Cable television, Broadband Internet, Telephone service, Water, Electricity, Natural gas
- Number of employees: 196 (2017)
- Website: cfu.net

Cedar Falls Utilities (CFU) is a municipally-owned public utility serving Cedar Falls, Iowa and is a member of the Iowa Association of Municipal Utilities (IAMU). CFU provides municipal water service, electricity generation and distribution, natural gas service, and combined cable television, Internet access, and phone service to its customers. CFU serves approximately 19,000 Cedar Falls residents and businesses with over 14,900 broadband customers.

== History ==
=== Founding to 1919 ===
==== The 1880s ====
Cedar Falls Utilities began as a municipally owned waterworks in 1888 which supplied spring water to residents and businesses. The waterworks was praised for its water and nearly "legendary state of purity".

==== The 1890s ====
In the late 1890s, a franchise was granted to a company based in Waterloo, Iowa (Citizens Gas and Electric Company) for electric production which powered street and house lighting for 15 years. Due to this existing franchise – despite public interest in developing a community-owned electric company, and hoping to avoid a monopoly situation – focus was placed on creating a community-owned gas plant. A short franchise was granted to George A. Dunkle of Chicago to provide a gas plant and distribution system, but was quickly disbanded after a fatal accident caused by the lighted match of an employee. 25-year franchise rights were then granted to Citizens Gas and Electric Company in Waterloo for gas production and distribution in Cedar Falls.

==== The 1910s ====
In the early 1910s, ordinary citizens and industrial leaders alike began taking note of the city's poor street lighting. In a special election on March 13, 1913 Cedar Falls residents voted in favor of a bond to construct a municipally owned power plant and distribution system. On April 1, 1914, generation started at the plant and the first customers were served. Shortly after production began, in June 1914, the community-owned electric company signed an agreement with the Iowa State Teachers College (now the University of Northern Iowa) to supply electricity to the campus.

=== 1920 to 1959 ===
==== The 1920s ====
After pushes to raise gas prices from the Citizens Gas and Electric company, as well as a fatal gas explosion killing a Cedar Falls family, public enthusiasm for a municipally owned gas utility steadily increased over the course of the 1920s. An engineering consulting firm was hired from Kansas City to investigate the gas situation in Cedar Falls, by whom recommendations were made to establish a community-owned gas manufacturing and distribution system. During this time, the public waterworks and electric distribution systems continued to operate smoothly. In 1926, the original cost of the power plant was paid off, about 12 years after it was established. Then, in March, 1928, a vote was held and passed by a 5-1/2 to 1 margin to construct a municipal gas utility.

==== The 1930s ====
In 1936, demand for electricity threatened to exceed the municipal utility's means to produce it. Enthusiasts called for a hydroelectric power plant to be built on the Cedar River, claiming that hydroelectric power is "almost free for the asking." However, due to drought and extremely low water levels in recent years, the utility opted to construct a 2,500 kilowatt steam turbine at the power plant instead. Construction of the turbine was completed in 1937.

In the late 1930s, due to damage of the swimming beach on the Cedar River, the utility company transformed the artificial lake at their power plant into a public swimming pool. Expenses for maintenance of the lake and grounds, construction of bath houses and fences, and maintenance of a safety boat were charged to the lighting fund. Promotion, staff, water treatment, and classes were charged to a city recreation fund.

==== The 1940s ====
In 1939, surveys began for adapting a recently rebuilt dam on the Cedar River with a hydroelectric plant. A site was chosen a quarter-mile downstream from the dam, and a 1,200 kilowatt hydroelectric plant went into service on February 1, 1941. During the first full year of service, due to unusually high water levels on the Cedar River, the hydroelectric plant produced about 60 percent of the city's electric needs, a mark not to be reached again during the lifetime of the plant.

The year 1945, with the end of World War II, marked the beginning of a steady increase in demand for all utility services. The G.I. Bill of Rights brought an unprecedented number of young men to Cedar Falls for college and to start new lives with their families. During this time, old water and electric production equipment, as well as the employees who maintained them, began to show their age. The equipment could not keep up with demand, and workers who had known the operation of this equipment from the beginning were starting to retire. Plans were made for plant upgrades at the municipal utilities, specifically for electric production equipment and water well pumps which had grown obsolete. In the late 1940s, to keep up with "the fastest growing city in Iowa" and their utility needs, a board of trustees appointed by the mayor to oversee company operation was considered.

==== The 1950s ====
The 1950s were a period of great expansion for Cedar Falls and the utility company necessarily expanded with it. Natural gas distribution began in the mid 50s. In 1956, nearly 6.1 million gallons of water were pumped to citizens and businesses of Cedar Falls. A 5,000 kilowatt turbine-generator, completed in 1955, was constructed to meet growing electric demands, only to be met with further increased demand in 1956 when a 10,000 kilowatt interchange agreement was made with the Iowa Public Service Company. In 1959, further expansion of the city's electrical distribution system was needed. Plans were also made for an extensive street lighting program to improve the quality of street lights throughout Cedar Falls. That year, 94.2% of energy was generated at the Utility's power plant, 5.47% was produced by the hydroelectric plant, and about 0.25% was purchased from the Iowa Public Service Company.

=== 1960 to 1999 ===
==== The 1960s ====
Now supporting a population nearly 7,000 greater than a decade before, the electric and gas departments continued their rapid expansion during the 1960s. A new office building was completed in March 1960 for the Gas, Water, and Electric department's office workers which included a 4,500 square foot community room and commonly hosted meetings for the Cedar Falls City Council, United Appeal, Girl Scouts, Red Cross, and local churches. Cedar Falls Municipal Utilities was one of three fallout shelter sites in Cedar Falls during the Cuban Missile Crisis. The Black Hawk County Civil Defense stocked the shelter with food, medical, and sanitation supplies.

The newly appointed Board of Trustees's first major concern was the need for expanded access to electric service. Proposals for a 16,500 kilowatt steam turbine-generator were made in late 1960 and construction began in March 1962. When completed, the new power plant addition was the tallest structure in Cedar Falls. A new Gas Distribution facility went into service in late 1963 and by 1965 80 percent of homes in Cedar Falls were heated with natural gas.

In 1966 the modern CFU logo was first used. That same year, two and a half miles of water main was laid helping supply over 780 million gallons of water to the people of Cedar Falls. In 1968, a massive 25,000 kilowatt combustion engine – the largest in Iowa at the time – was constructed in Cedar Falls.

During the summer of 1969, the community swimming pool was filled in to provide additional coal storage.

=== 2025: Ending Cable TV ===
On October 6, 2025, CFU has announced that it will end its cable TV service amid soaring costs of programming contracts and the number of customers preferring streaming television platforms with advanced technology not provided from the company's traditional lines. CFU is expected to wind down its cable TV operations by October 11, 2026; however, the company will continue to offer fiber-driven internet. During this transitional period, CFU personnel are helping its current customers make the switch to other providers--such as YouTube TV. This announcement came at a time when the media landscape had undergone dramatic changes, and smaller cable companies face rising operational and content costs.

=== General managers 1958–2018 ===
In March, 1958, John P. Pace, a graduate of the University of New Mexico with a degree in electrical engineering, was hired as the Utility's first CEO. A special election in August that same year transferred control of the Utilities from the city council to a Board of Trustees appointed by the mayor of Cedar Falls. The first Board of Trustees took office on September 1, 1959.

Name	Years served
John Pace	1958–1965
Andrew McDivitt	1965–1974
Richard Johnson	1974–1978
H. Dean Crowe	1978–1995
Ken Alberts	1995–1997
Jerry Shoff	1998–2000
Robert Rodi	2000–2002
Jim Krieg	2002–2017
Steve Bernard	2018–2024
Susan Abernathy	2024–Current

== Economic development ==
The Municipal Communications Utility is community-owned but not tax supported. A group of local citizens forms a board of trustees who set rates for all CFU services. The fees for these services completely cover the Utility, there is no cost to the public.

CFU participates in municipal efforts to promote economic development, which in turn results in a larger customer base for its utility services. CFU continuously expands and improves its service to meet community needs. Due to customer demand, particularly from local businesses, the municipal utility launched phone service in May 2016. The utility donated land to form the Cedar Falls Industrial and Technology Park in the late 1960s and in more recent years has aggressively expanded access to its communications services, including cable television, phone, and broadband Internet access, which the city promotes as a key factor in its economic-development strategy. The communications utility began service in 1996 after a 1994 community referendum with over 70% voter approval. CFU offers a variety of communications services from budget to premium, meeting a wide range of customer needs and further expanding community development. As a whole, CFU subscribers save more than $4 million a year on communications services, compared with the average peer-city rates.

=== Telecommunications ===
Cedar Falls Utilities uses FTTx network, providing high speed internet, phone, and video services. CFU peers with the three most highly connected networks in the world – Level 3 Communications, Cogent Communications, and Hurricane Electric. They are connected via one-hop fiber paths through Chicago, Kansas City, and Des Moines.

== Renewable energy ==
From 2008 to 2016, use of coal powered electric generation has decreased in CFU's plants by 33%. The significant reduction in use of fossil fuels is a result of the use of solar and wind power by the company.

Over the past thirty years, CFU's energy efficiency programs have included local building energy codes, on-bill financing, sizing of A/C unites under a rebate program, and smart thermostat pilot programs. CFU was also one of the first utility sponsors of the Energy Star Verified Installation program.

=== Wind energy ===
CFU was an early entrant into the market for renewable energy in the United States, investing in a wind-energy project in 1998 along with six other Iowa municipal utilities. In 2016, 28% of electricity supplied to Cedar Falls was wind generated, up from 2% in 2006.

=== Solar energy ===
When energy generation started in April 2016 at CFU's solar farm, it was the largest community solar project in Iowa with over 1,200 participating residents and businesses. Eight acres of land near Prairie Lakes Park was donated by the city of Cedar Falls for the project. The total capacity of the solar array is 1.5 MW.

== Awards and recognition ==
=== Water ===
- The Iowa Section of the American Water Works Association (AWWA) voted CFU the winner of the 2013 Water Tasting Testing Competition for Best Tasting Water in Iowa at the IA-AWWA Annual Conference.

=== Electric ===
- In 2011, CFU received the Award of Continued Excellence (ACE) from the American Public Power Association for sustained commitment to energy innovation and support of research and development projects aimed at improving energy efficiency and promoting renewable resources.
- CFU received two awards from the American Public Power Association in 2016. CFU was designated a Diamond level Reliable Public Power Provider with 99.996% electric reliability and a 17-minute average outage duration. CFU also received the E.F. Scattergood System Achievement award in 2016 for sustained performance that is widely recognized in the public power field.

=== Telecommunications ===
- In 2013, Cedar Falls – with the help of CFU – was Iowa's first "Gigabit City", delivering speeds of up to one gigabit per second to its customers.
- In October 2014, Google named Cedar Falls Iowa's top e-commerce city.
- On January 14, 2015 – in his first visit to Iowa since his 2012 re-election campaign – President Barack Obama recognized Cedar Falls and the municipal utility as a small community that can compete with private businesses to provide world-class internet access to customers. The President praised CFU for being a small community with broadband internet 100 times faster than the national average. President Obama also pointed out the benefits of having competition in the telecommunications industry to keep prices low and service level high. That same day, Mediacom – a privately owned telecommunications company in the Midwest – released a statement voicing their deep concern about President Obama's comments on CFU.
- In 2017, Calix – a telecommunications company focused on cloud products and access networks – presented the utility with the Calix Innovation Award: Innovation in AXOS Subscriber Management for demonstrating "outstanding creativity when leveraging Calix technology to deploy best-in-class services."

=== Safety ===
- In 2011, The Iowa-Illinois Safety Council Chapter of National Safety Council recognized CFU for "Incident Rate Excellence".
- In 2012, CFU received the Midwest Energy Association (MEA) Accident Prevention Award in recognition of an outstanding 2011 safety record.
- On July 20, 2013, Iowa Council 61 of The American Federation of State, County, and Municipal Employees (AFSCME) recognized CFU as a member of AFSCME who in the course of their work duties became aware of an emergency situation and acted quickly, calmly, and professionally and as a result, saved a life.

=== Employer of Choice ===
The Waterloo-Cedar Falls Courier is a local newspaper which annually recognizes employers in the Cedar Valley for excellence in promoting employee quality of life. CFU has been nominated by employees and recognized by the Courier many times in the past decade:

- September 2011 – Cedar Falls Utilities was nominated as an Employer of Choice by its employees for "creating a culture where employees feel valued and appreciated."
- September 2012 – Cedar Falls Utilities was nominated as an Employer of Choice by its employees for outstanding health benefits.
- August 2014 – Cedar Falls Utilities was nominated as an Employer of Choice by its employees for "exceeding customer expectations and the expectations of its workforce."
- August 2015 – Cedar Falls Utilities was nominated as an Employer of Choice by its employees for "putting emphasis on customer satisfaction, employee enthusiasm, and fiscal responsibility."
- September 2017 – Cedar Falls Utilities was nominated as an Employer of Choice by its employees for their flexibility and promoting a family-friendly atmosphere.
