= Nilo Hovey =

Nilo W. Hovey (September 22, 1906 – March 14, 1986) was an American clarinetist, composer, conductor, music educator, and author of many musical instrument method books.

== Early life ==
Nilo Wellington Hovey was born in Iowa on September 22, 1906, to Leroy Dana and Lois Graham Hovey. Raised in Cedar Falls, Iowa, Hovey participated in the Cedar Falls Municipal Band, initially on saxophone, but eventually on most of the reed instruments, and attended Iowa State Teacher's College (now the University of Northern Iowa).

== Career ==
During Hovey's tenure as Director of Instrumental Music in the public schools of Hammond, Indiana (1926–44), he wrote his first instructional book, a method book for clarinet titled Rubank Elementary Method: Clarinet.

Among the bands he directed in Hammond were the Hammond Technical High School band and the George Rogers Clark High School band, both of which received accolades under his direction.

In 1944, Mr. Hovey began a position as director of the Concert Band and Chairman of the Music Education department at the Arthur Jordan College of Music at Butler University in Indianapolis, Indiana.

Mr. Hovey started working for the Selmer Company in 1957 as the education director in Elkhart, Indiana and remained there for the next 18 years and received many awards and accolades.

Hovey served as the president of the Music Industry Council from 1962 to 1964, as well as the president of the American Bandmaster's Association from 1970 to 1971. He was also a member of Phi Mu Alpha Sinfonia, and an honorary member of Kappa Kappa Psi, Phi Beta Mu and the Canadian Bandmasters Association. Before his death, Hovey continued to direct numerous bands and ensembles and wrote or edited many music instruction books and methods which are still in use today. Hovey was also inducted into the National Band Association's Hall of Fame of Distinguished Band Conductors shortly before his death in March, 1986.

== Personal life ==
Hovey married Ruth Emily Sinden from Maquoketa, Iowa in December 1927, whom he met while a student at Iowa State Teachers College. After her death in 1978, Hovey married Helen Gowdy in 1979. Hovey had two daughters by the previous marriage. Hovey died on March 14, 1986.

== List of works ==
=== Books ===
- Advanced Technique for Bands: Trumpet By Nilo W. Hovey (M.M. Cole Publishing Co., 1980)
- Advanced Technique for Bands: Alto Saxophone By Nilo W. Hovey (M.M. Cole Publishing Co., 1980)
- Belwin Clarinet Method, Book One By Kenneth Gekeler, Nilo W. Hovey (Editor) (Alfred Music, 1985)
- Belwin Clarinet Method, Book 2 (as editor) By Gekeler & Kenneth, Nilo W. Hovey (Editor) (Alfred Music, 1985)
- Belwin Saxophone Method By Kenneth Gekeler, Nilo W. Hovey (Editor) (Alfred Music, 1985)
- Belwin Oboe Method, Book One (as editor) By Kenneth Gekeler, Nilo W. Hovey (Editor) (Alfred Music, 1985)
- Belwin Flute Method Book Two By Kenneth Gekeler, Nilo W. Hovey (Editor) (Alfred Music, 1985)
- Belwin Elementary Band Method: Trombone (Bass Clef) By Fred Weber, Nilo W. Hovey (Editor) (Alfred Music, 1985)
- Belwin Elementary Band Method By Fred Weber, Nilo W. Hovey (Editor) (Alfred Music, 1985)
- Belwin Intermediate Band Method Bb Cornet (Trumpet) By Fred Weber, Nilo W. Hovey (Editor) (Alfred Music, 1985)
- Cimera-Hovey Method for Trombone and Baritone By Jaroslav Cimera and Nilo W. Hovey (Alfred Music, 1985)
- Daily Exercises for Saxophone By Nilo W. Hovey (Alfred Music, 1985)
- Edwards-Hovey Method for Cornet or Trumpet By Austyn R. Edwards, Nilo W. Hovey (Editor) (Alfred Music, 1985)
- Edwards-Hovey Method for Cornet or Trumpet, Bk 2 By Austyn R. Edwards and Nilo W. Hovey (Alfred Music, 1985)
- Efficient Rehearsal Procedures for School Bands, (Elkhart: The Selmer Co., 1976)
- First Book of Practical Studies: Cornet and Trumpet By Robert W. Getchell, Nilo W. Hovey (Editor) (Alfred Music, 1985)
- First Book of Practical Studies for Clarinet By Nilo W. Hovey (Alfred Music, 1985)
- First Book of Practical Studies for Tuba By Robert W. Getchell, Nilo W. Hovey (Editor) (Alfred Music, 1985)
- First Book of Practical Studies for Bassoon By D. McDowells, Nilo W. Hovey (Editor) (Alfred Music 1987)
- First Book of Practical Studies for Saxophone By Nilo W. Hovey (Alfred Music, 1985)
- Pottag-Hovey Method for French Horn, Book One By Max P. Pottag and Nilo W. Hovey (Alfred Music, 1985)
- Practical Studies for Cornet and Trumpet, Book II By Robert W. Getchell, Nilo W. Hovey (Editor) (Alfred Music, 1985)
- Rubank Elementary Method Oboe
- Rubank Elementary Method Clarinet
- Rubank Elementary Method Saxophone
- Rubank Elementary Method E-flat/BB-flat Bass (Tuba or Sousaphone)
- Rubank Instrumental Charts Complete Chromatic Fingering Charts for Basses (Eb & BBb)
- 2nd Book of Practical Studies for Cornet and Trumpet (as editor)
- Second Book of Practical Studies for Clarinet By Nilo W. Hovey (Alfred Music, 1985)
- Second Book of Practical Studies for Tuba By Robert W. Getchell, Nilo W. Hovey (Editor) (Alfred Music, 1985)
- Second Book of Practical Studies for Saxophone By Nilo W. Hovey (Alfred Music, 1985)
- Selmer Teacher’s Guide to the Clarinet (1967)
- Supplementary Duets for Flutes
- T-I-P-P-S for Band: E-Flat Alto Saxophone By Nilo W. Hovey (Alfred Music, 1985)
- T-I-P-P-S for Band: E-Flat Baritone Saxophone
- T-I-P-P-S for Band: Trombone
- T-I-P-P-S for Band: C Flute (Piccolo)
- T-I-P-P-S for Band: B-Flat Tenor Saxophone
- T-I-P-P-S for Band: Bassoon
- T-I-P-P-S for Band: Baritone
- T-I-P-P-S for Band: E-Flat Alto Clarinet

=== Chamber Compositions ===
- Aria Cantando, for clarinet and piano (1948, with Beldon Leonard)
- Chanson Moderne, for clarinet and piano (1948, with Beldon Leonard)
- Clouds in Summer, for clarinet and piano (1948, with Beldon Leonard)
- Gypsy Moods, for clarinet and piano (1948, with Beldon Leonard)
- Solo Semplice, for clarinet and piano (1948, with Beldon Leonard)
- Valse Grazioso, for clarinet and piano (1948, with Beldon Leonard)
- Song of Spring, for clarinet and piano (1962, with Beldon Leonard)
- The Carnival of Venice, for clarinet and piano (1964, with Beldon Leonard)
- Bagatelle, for clarinet and piano (1965, with Beldon Leonard)
- Andante and Waltz, for clarinet and piano (1968, with Beldon Leonard)
- Caprice, for clarinet and piano (1968, with Beldon Leonard)
- Contra Danse, for clarinet and piano (1968, with Beldon Leonard)
- Il Primo Canto, for clarinet and piano (1968, with Beldon Leonard)
- In the Minor Mode, for clarinet and piano (1970, with Beldon Leonard)
- Minuetto, for clarinet and piano (1970, with Beldon Leonard)
- Reflections, for clarinet and piano (1970, with Beldon Leonard)
- Concert Piece, for clarinet and piano (1973, with Beldon Leonard)
