= Adelia M. Hoyt =

American librarian and writer

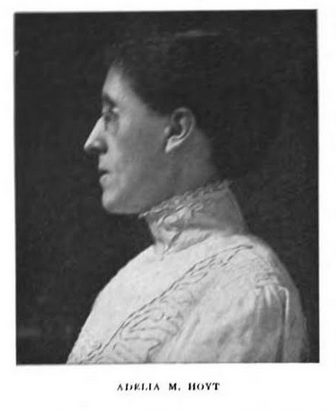
Adelia M. Hoyt, from a 1911 publication.

Adelia M. Hoyt (December 3, 1865 – April 1, 1966) was an American librarian, writer, and advocate for blind people.

== Early life ==
Adelia M. Hoyt was born near Cedar Falls, Iowa, in a sod house, the daughter of Caroline Mix DeGroff Hoyt and her second husband. Both of her parents were born in New York. She had recurrent fevers in childhood that caused significant vision loss. She attended the Iowa School for the Blind.

== Career ==
Adelia M. Hoyt was a vocal advocate for self-help by the blind community. "Our most successful workshops and homes have been planned and supervised by sightless persons," she explained, and "every organized effort for the welfare of the blind should have on its board of directors some competent sightless person or persons" to prevent "many a sad mistake." She helped to found the Iowa Home for Sightless Women in Des Moines, and served on its board. She was also president of the Iowa School for the Blind Alumni Association.

Hoyt was a librarian at the Library of Congress's Reading Room for the Blind, beginning as assistant to Gertrude Tressel Rider from 1913 to 1925, and later becoming director of braille transcribing. She and Gertrude T. Rider published Braille Transcribing: A Manual (1925), to guide the volunteer transcribing efforts of the American Red Cross after World War I. In 1930 she testified before a Congressional committee in support of the Pratt Bill, authorizing federal subsidies for braille publishing. Hoyt retired from the Library of Congress in 1938.

In 1940, she was awarded the Migel Medal from the American Foundation for the Blind for her lifetime of service to the community. Helen Keller presented the award. Hoyt wrote and published a memoir, The Unfolding Years (1950). In 1953, she was honored by the American Association of Workers for the Blind.

== Personal life ==
Adelia M. Hoyt marked her 100th birthday in 1965. She died a few months later in 1966, at a care home in Washington, D. C. A small file of Hoyt's papers is in the collection of the Iowa Women's Archives, University of Iowa Libraries.
