= George Wyth Memorial State Park =

State park in Black Hawk County, Iowa

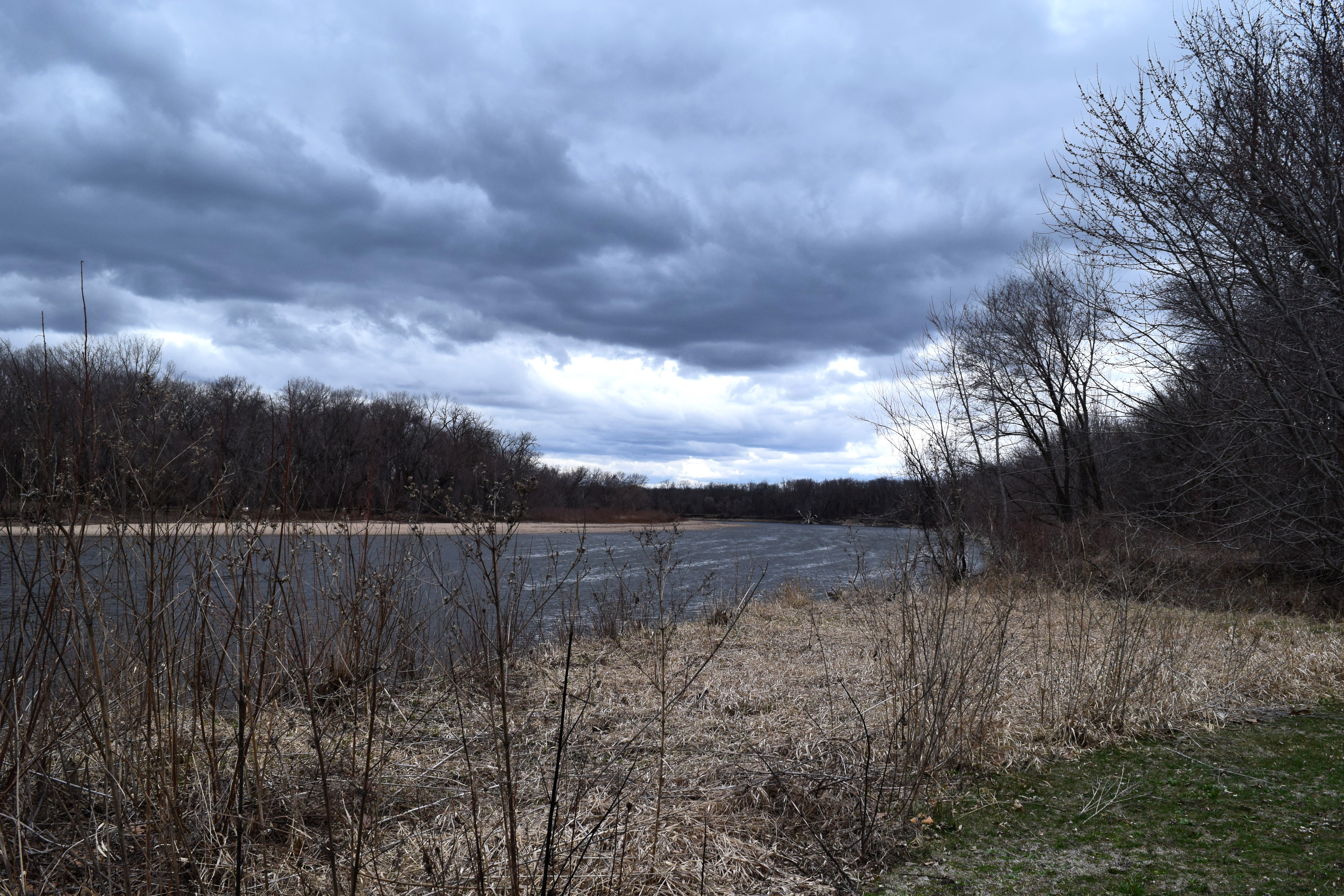
- The Cedar River in George Wyth Memorial State Park

- Location within Iowa Location within the United States
- Location: Black Hawk County, Iowa, United States
- Coordinates: 42°32′05″N 92°24′42″W
- Area: 1,200 acres (490 ha)
- Elevation: 846 ft (258 m)
- Established: 1940
- Administrator: Iowa Department of Natural Resources
- Website: Official website

The George Wyth Memorial State Park is a public recreation area on the Cedar River, located two miles west of Cedar Falls and four miles northwest of Waterloo in Black Hawk County, Iowa, United States. The state park features camping, over 10 miles of paved and unpaved trails for hiking and biking, and fishing and boating on four different lakes: Brinker, George Wyth, Fisher and Alice Wyth. The park was named Josh Higgins Parkway when it was dedicated in 1940 and later renamed in honor of Cedar Falls businessman George Wyth.
