= Kokila =

Kokila may refer to:

== Films ==
- Kokila (1937 film), a Hindi-language film
- Kokila (1977 film), a Kannada-language film
- Kokila (1990 film), a Telugu-language film directed by A S Geethakrishna
- Kokila, a character in the 2010–2017 TV series Saath Nibhaana Saathiya

== People ==
- Kokila Kishorechandra Bulsara (1931–2004), known as Nirupa Roy, Indian actress
- Kokila Gunawardena (born 1974), Sri Lankan politician
- Kokila Jayasuriya (born 1994), Sri Lankan actor
- Kokila Mohan (born 1956), known as Mohan, Indian actor
- Sadhu Kokila (born 1966), Indian actor
- Kokilaben Dhirubai Ambani

== Other uses ==
- Kokila, a Sanskrit name for the koel bird
- Kokilapriya, a raga in Carnatic music
- Kokila Sandeśa, a 15th-century Sanskrit love poem written by Uddanda Śāstrī
- Kokila, a variety of the Doromu language of Papua New Guinea
- Kokila, the Assamese name for the freshwater garfish
- Kokila, a publishing imprint of Penguin Young Readers

== See also ==
- Koel (disambiguation)
- Koyal (disambiguation)
