= Koyal =

Koyal may refer to: Koyal Pakistan's Largest Regional Music Platform

- Koel, a genus of cuckoo birds
- Koyal, Haryana, a village in India
- Koyal, Madhya Pradesh, a village in India
- Koyal, Rajasthan, a village in India
- Koyal (TV series), a 2022 Pakistani television series

== See also ==
- Koel (disambiguation)
- Kokila (disambiguation)
