= Ruth Suckow =

American novelist

- Born: August 6, 1892; Hawarden, Iowa
- Died: January 23, 1960 (aged 67); Claremont, California
- Resting place: Greenwood Cemetery in Cedar Falls, Iowa
- Education: University of Denver (BA, MA)
- Occupation: Novelist
- Writing career
- Genre: American literary regionalism
- Notable works: The Bonney Family, The Folks
- Notable awards: Iowa Women's Hall of Fame

Ruth Suckow (August 6, 1892 – January 23, 1960) was an American regionalist writer from Iowa. She wrote novels and stories. According to one critic, "Suckow’s portrayal of the lives of ordinary “folks” enables modern readers to empathize with her characters, many of whom were Midwesterners. Her poetic descriptions of the Iowa farmland evoke the artistic realism of Grant Wood paintings and place her squarely in the Midwestern regionalist milieu of the interwar years." She has been called "Iowa’s first feminist writer".

== Early life ==
Ruth Suckow was born in Hawarden, a small town in Sioux County on the Big Sioux River in far northwestern Iowa, to a German American family where her father was the pastor of the Congregational Church.

After leaving Hawarden in early 1898, the Suckow family lived in a number of towns in northern Iowa. In 1907, Suckow's father accepted a position at Grinnell College. Suckow graduated from Grinnell High School in 1910, and entered the college that fall. While a student at Grinnell, she became involved in dramatics.

Suckow left Grinnell College to study at the Curry School of Expression in Boston from 1913 to 1915. Her novel The Odyssey of a Nice Girl (1925) reflects that experience. She left Boston to join her mother and sister who were living in Colorado for health reasons and enrolled at the University of Denver. She earned a B.A. in 1917 and an M.A. in English in 1918.

== Literary career ==
While in Denver, Suckow became interested in bee keeping, and spent a summer as an apprentice in a bee yard. After her mother died, Suckow moved to Earlville, a small town in eastern Iowa just west of Dubuque. For six years in the 1920s she ran a small apiary at the edge of town near an orchard, and began to write. During that time she wrote the novels Country People (1924) and T

he Odyssey of a Nice Girl (1925). Suckow spent her winters in other places, chiefly New York's Greenwich Village.

In 1921, her first published story, "Uprooted," appeared in Midland, edited by John T. Frederick and published at the time in Iowa City. That story later appeared in the short story collection Iowa Interiors (1926). At Frederick's suggestion, she sent some stories to The Smart Set, a magazine edited by H. L. Mencken and George Jean Nathan, who accepted her stories.

Suckow had some of her stories published in The American Mercury, also edited by Mencken. Her first novel, Country People, was followed by a number of novels published by Alfred A. Knopf. In 1934, Farrar & Rinehart published Suckow's longest novel, The Folks, which followed the lives of a small-town Iowa family and was a Literary Guild selection.

During the Great Depression in 1936 she filed reports for the Farm Tenancy Committee.

Suckow's book New Hope (1942) portrays Hawarden during the period from 1890 to 1910 and describes the two-year stay of a young minister in the life of a new town.

== Marriage, travels, and political work ==
Ferner Nuhn, 1940, Sucknow's husband

In 1929, Suckow married Ferner Nuhn of Cedar Falls, Iowa, a writer, teacher, and journalist who admired her work; he was about ten years younger than she. After their marriage, the couple lived in various parts of the United States, from Santa Fe, New Mexico, to rural New England. In the mid-1930s, they spent two years in Washington, D.C., where Nuhn wrote pamphlets and other materials for the U.S. Department of Agriculture, which was then under the direction of fellow Iowan Henry A. Wallace. Suckow served on the President's Farm Tenancy Commission during the Depression. From 1937 to 1947, the couple lived in Cedar Falls, where Nuhn managed some family business interests.

In 1943, Suckow established contacts with the conscientious objectors to World War II. She had found World War I profoundly disturbing and her relationship with her father had been damaged by his activities supporting the war. In 1944, she traveled to the West Coast to visit six Civilian Public Service camps and one mental hospital. She spoke on writing and literature, read manuscripts, and encouraged young men. At the camp in Waldport, Oregon, she met the poet William Everson and continued to correspond with him for several years after the war.

== Retirement and death ==
In the late 1940s, Suckow and Nuhn left Cedar Falls for health reasons: Suckow had arthritis and Nuhn suffered from hay fever. They moved to Tucson, Arizona, and later to their final home in Claremont, California, where they were active in the Religious Society of Friends (Quakers).

Suckow did little writing in the 1940s and 1950s. In 1952, Rinehart published Some Others and Myself, seven short stories and a spiritual memoir. In 1959, Viking Press brought out The John Wood Case, her last novel, which concerned an embezzlement case in a church. Suckow died in 1960 at her home in Claremont, California, and is interred in Greenwood Cemetery in Cedar Falls, Iowa.

== Legacy ==
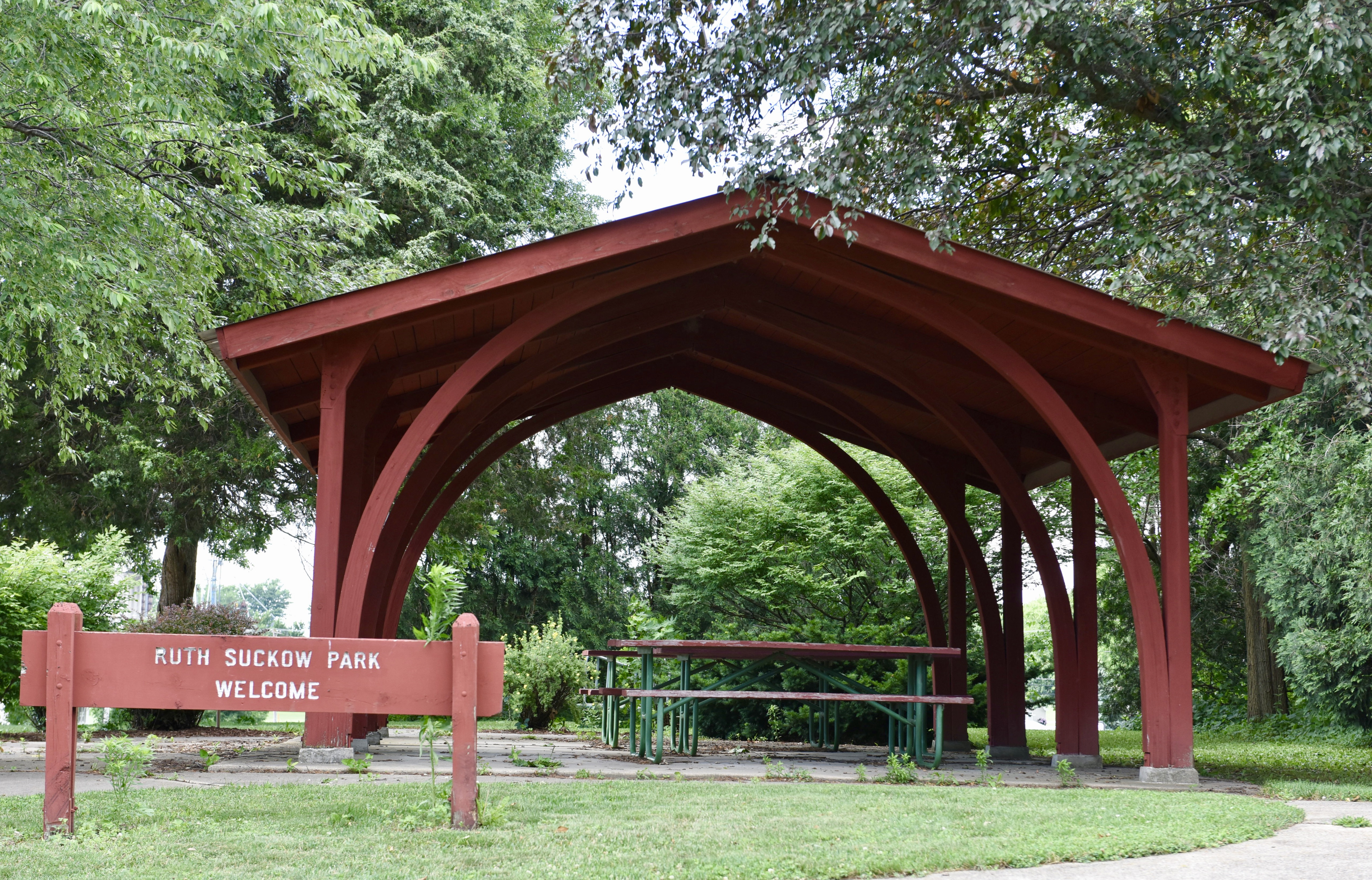
Ruth Suckow Park now stands where her house was located

The town of Earlville, Iowa, contained the Ruth Suckow Park (where her cottage used to be), the Orchard Apiary Site, and the Earlville-Ruth Suckow Memorial Library, which has a variety of memorabilia.

Suckow's memoir is included in Some Others and Myself (1952). Her papers are in the Special Collections, University of Iowa Libraries, Iowa City.

An obituary appeared in The New York Times January 24, 1960. The only biography is Leedice McAnelly Kissane, Ruth Suckow (1969).

=== Literary legacy ===
Suckow is sometimes recalled as a "regionalist", but she did not consider herself such a writer. She said that she wrote about "people, situations, and their meaning."

Suckow's childhood home has been preserved at Calliope Village in Hawarden, Iowa.

== Works ==
=== Books ===
- Country People, (1924)
- The Odyssey of a Nice Girl, (1925)
- Iowa Interiors (title in UK: People and Houses), (1926)
- The Bonney Family, (1928)
- Cora, (1929)
- The Kramer Girls, (1930)
- Children And Older People, (1931)
- The Folks, (1934)
- Carry-Over, (1936)
- New Hope, (1936)
- A Memoir, (1952)
- Some Others and Myself, (1952)
- The John Wood Case, (1959)
- A Ruth Suckow Omnibus, (1988)

=== Magazine articles ===
- Iowa, (American Mercury #9, September 1926)
- A German Grandfather (American Mercury #12, November 1927)
- The Folk Idea in American Life (Scribner's 88, September 1930)
- Middle Western Literature, (English Journal #21, March 1932)
- An Almost Lost American Classic, (College English #14, March 1953)
