= Cedar Falls, Iowa =

- City
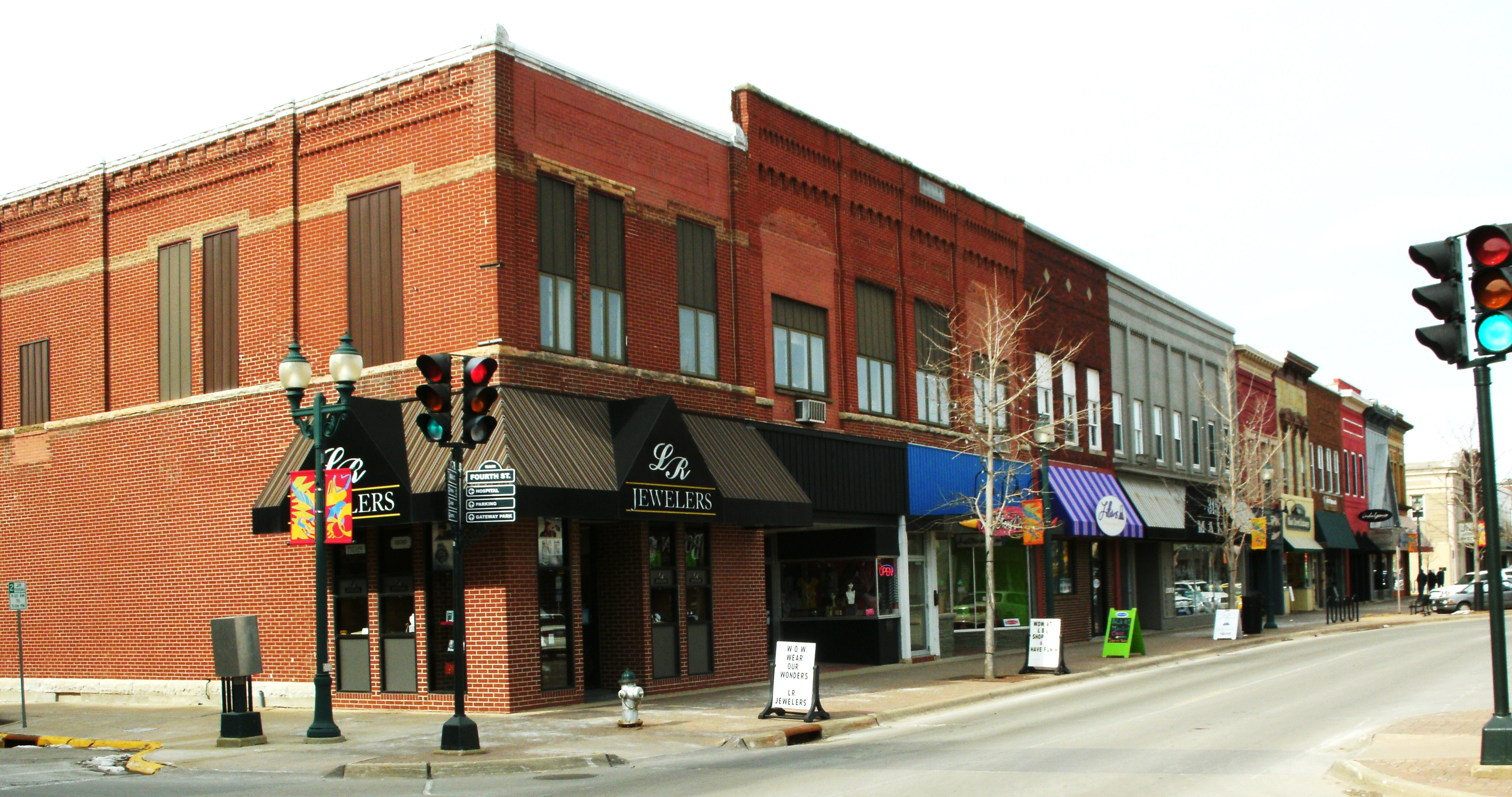
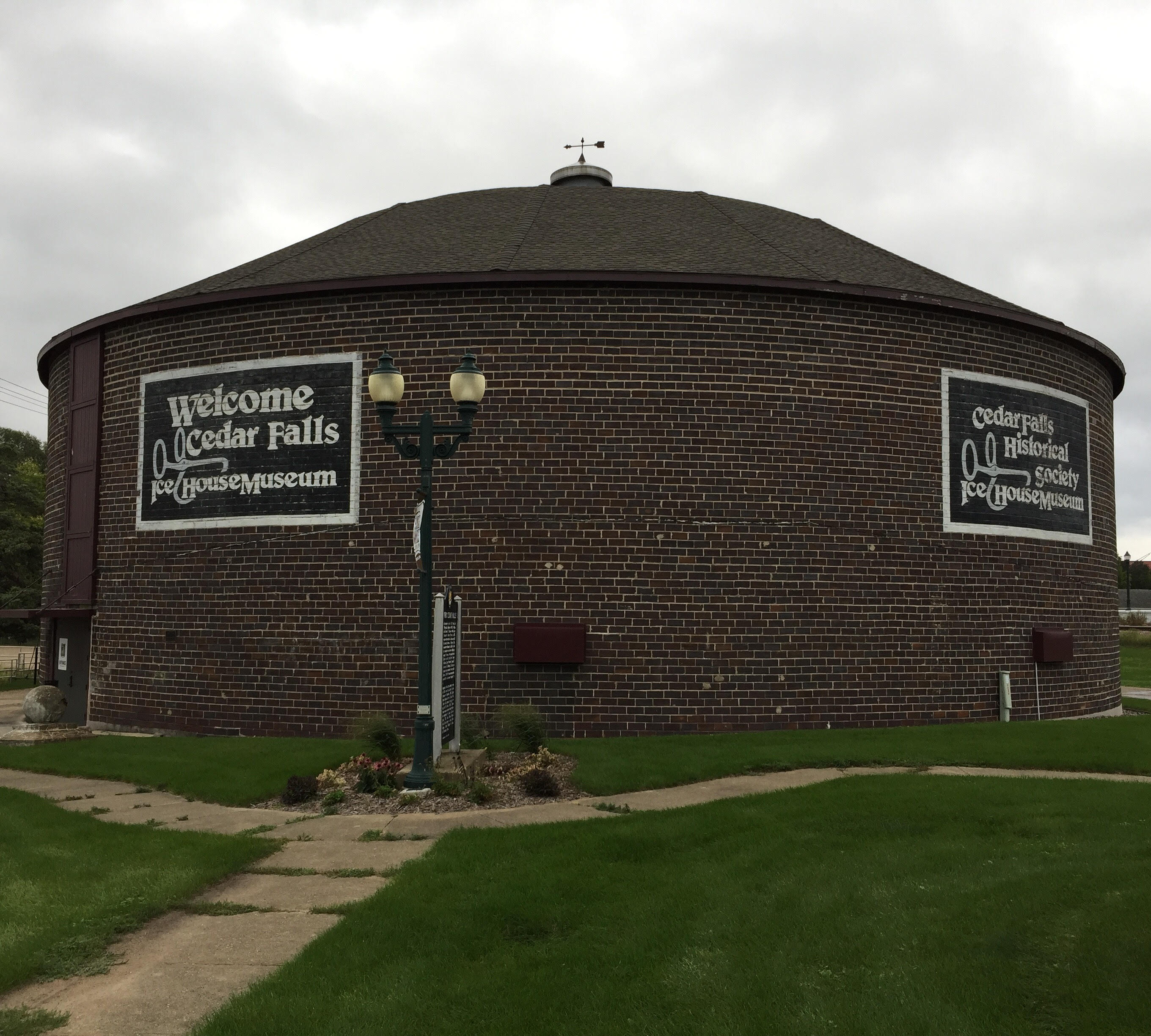
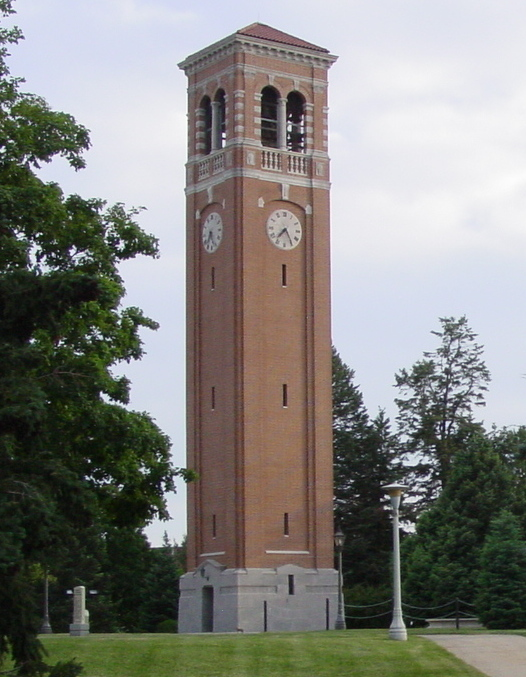
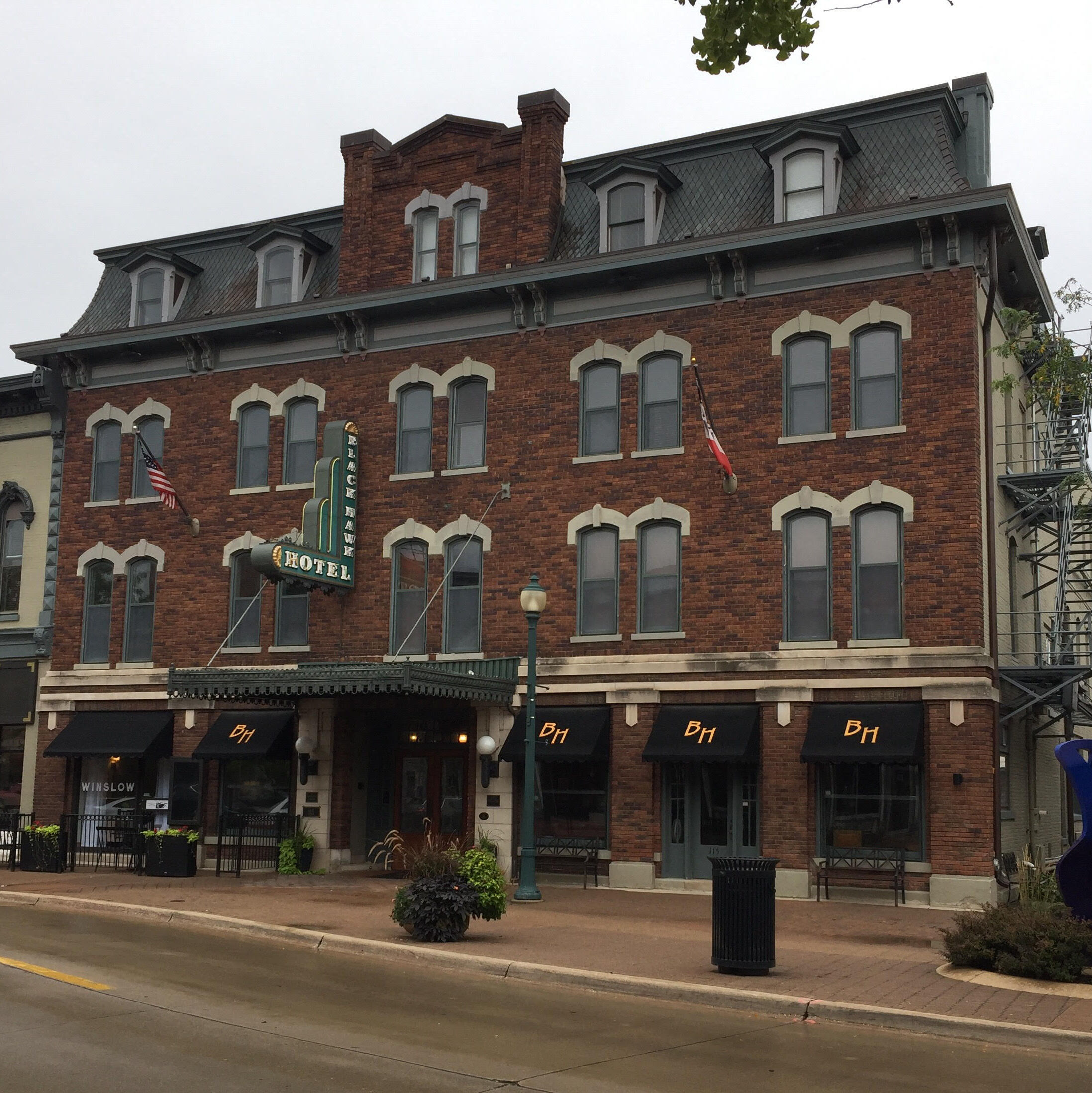
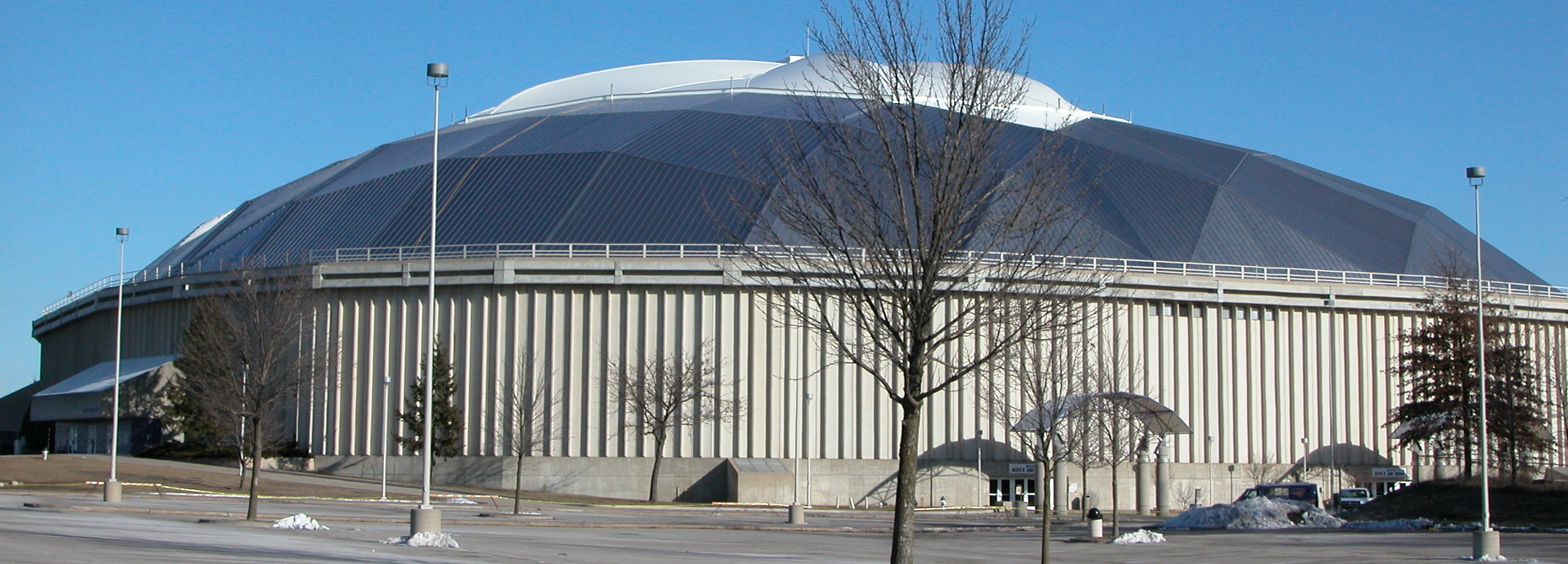
- Cedar Falls Downtown Historic District Cedar Falls Ice House UNI Campanile Black Hawk Hotel UNI-Dome

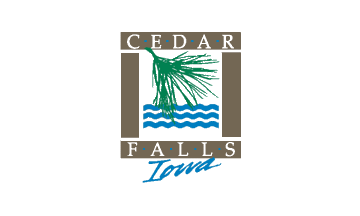
- Flag Logo

- Location within Black Hawk County and Iowa

- Location within Iowa Location within the United States
- Coordinates: 42°31′08″N 92°27′15″W
- Country: US
- State: Iowa
- County: Black Hawk

Area
  - Total: 30.29 sq mi (78.44 km^{2})
  - Land: 29.43 sq mi (76.23 km^{2})
  - Water: 0.85 sq mi (2.21 km^{2})
- Elevation: 879 ft (268 m)

Population (2020)
  - Total: 40,713
  - Rank: 13th in Iowa
  - Density: 1,380/sq mi (534/km^{2})
- Time zone: UTC-6 (CST)
  - Summer (DST): UTC-5 (CDT)
- ZIP code: 50613
- Area code: 319
- FIPS code: 19-11755
- GNIS ID: 2393774
- Website: cedarfalls.com

Cedar Falls is a city in Black Hawk County, Iowa, United States. As of the 2020 United States census, the city population was 40,713. Cedar Falls is home to the University of Northern Iowa (UNI), a public university.

Cedar Falls, along with neighboring city Waterloo, Iowa, are the two principal municipalities within the Waterloo-Cedar Falls Metropolitan Statistical Area. The Cedar River traverses the vicinity to the southeast.

== History ==
=== Early settlement and development ===
The Cedar Valley was historically inhabited by Indigenous peoples, including the Sauk and Meskwaki (Fox). Euro-American settlement of the area that became Cedar Falls began in March 1845, when brothers-in-law William R. Sturgis and Erasmus D. Adams established a settlement along the Cedar River. Initially known as Sturgis Falls, the settlement was renamed Cedar Falls around 1850.

The settlement developed rapidly following the arrival of the Overman family. John M. and Dempsey C. Overman, together with their associates, established a water-powered sawmill in 1848. A gristmill was added in 1850, providing milling services to settlers from surrounding areas. Andrew Mullarky established an early general store near Main and First streets in 1850.

In 1853, Cedar Falls was selected as the first county seat of Black Hawk County. The Overman family donated land to support the construction of county government facilities. However, a contested referendum in April 1855 resulted in the relocation of the county seat to nearby Waterloo. Cedar Falls was incorporated as a city in 1865.

=== Industrial and railroad development ===
The availability of water power from the Cedar River contributed to Cedar Falls' development as a milling and manufacturing center during the nineteenth century. Flour mills and other industries were established along the river, while surrounding agricultural communities provided raw materials and markets for manufactured goods.

The arrival of the Illinois Central Railroad in 1861 improved access to regional markets. Additional railroad connections followed, and by 1893 Cedar Falls was served by four railroad lines, including the Burlington, Cedar Rapids and Northern Railway and the Chicago Great Western Railway.

By the late nineteenth century, Cedar Falls supported a diversified industrial economy. In his 1893 Historical Record of Cedar Falls, local historian Peter Melendy documented more than 60 manufacturing and industrial establishments, including flour mills, foundries, woodworking operations, agricultural processing facilities, and machinery manufacturers. His account described the importance of both railroad transportation and the Cedar River's water power to the city's economic growth.

=== Education and twentieth-century growth ===
In 1865, a Soldiers' Orphans' Home opened in Cedar Falls to care for children of Civil War soldiers. A larger building was completed on a 40-acre site in 1869. Following the closure of the home in 1876, the property was transferred to the newly established Iowa State Normal School, which opened on September 6, 1876, to train teachers. The institution subsequently developed into the University of Northern Iowa.

Industrial growth continued into the twentieth century. In 1911, local entrepreneurs founded what became Viking Pump, a manufacturer of industrial pumps. Sartori Hospital was established in 1915, and additional civic institutions and public parks were developed during the early twentieth century.

Between 1950 and 1980, Cedar Falls experienced substantial population growth, influenced by the expansion of the University of Northern Iowa and industrial employment in the neighboring Waterloo metropolitan area. The city's population increased from 14,334 in 1950 to 36,322 in 1980.

The city's original name is commemorated by the annual Sturgis Falls Celebration, a community festival that developed from Cedar Falls' 1976 United States Bicentennial celebration.

== Geography ==
According to the United States Census Bureau, the city has a total area of 29.61 square miles (76.69 km^{2}), of which 28.75 square miles (74.46 km^{2}) is land and 0.86 square miles (2.23 km^{2}) is water.

Natural forest, prairie and wetland areas are found within the city limits at the Hartman Reserve Nature Center.

== Demographics ==
Historical population
Census	Pop.	Note	%±
1870	3,070		—
1880	3,020		−1.6%
1890	3,459		14.5%
1900	5,319		53.8%
1910	5,012		−5.8%
1920	6,316		26.0%
1930	7,362		16.6%
1940	9,349		27.0%
1950	14,334		53.3%
1960	21,195		47.9%
1970	29,597		39.6%
1980	36,322		22.7%
1990	34,298		−5.6%
2000	36,145		5.4%
2010	39,260		8.6%
2020	40,713		3.7%
U.S. Decennial Census

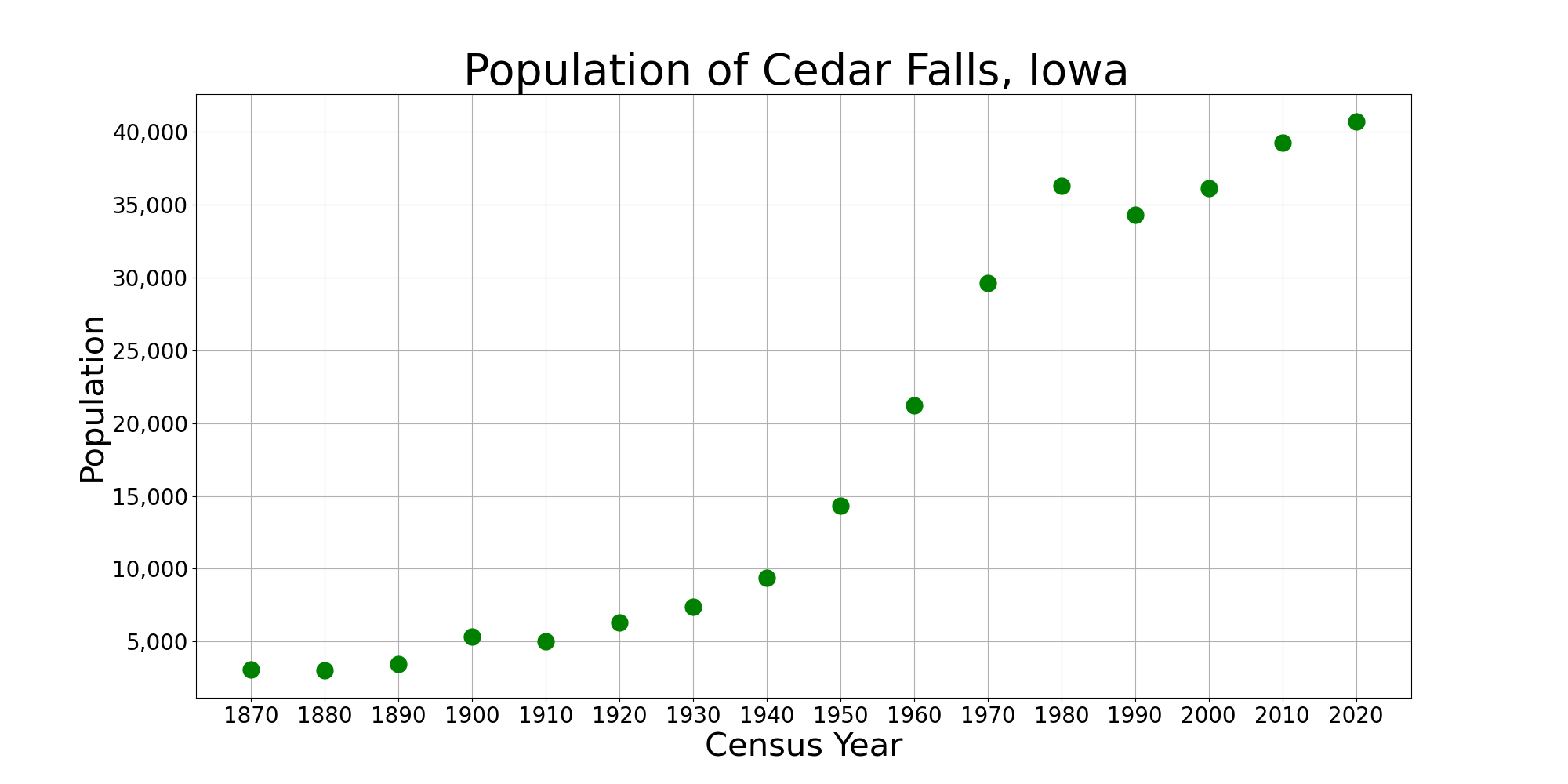
The population of Cedar Falls, Iowa from US census data

Cedar Falls is part of the Waterloo-Cedar Falls metropolitan area.

=== 2020 census ===
As of the 2020 census, Cedar Falls had a population of 40,713 and a population density of 1,401.8 inhabitants per square mile (541.2 inhabitants/km^{2}).

The median age was 31.4 years. 19.3% of residents were under the age of 18 and 17.2% were 65 years of age or older. For every 100 females there were 93.3 males, and for every 100 females age 18 and over there were 90.8 males age 18 and over.

97.0% of residents lived in urban areas, while 3.0% lived in rural areas.

There were 15,827 households in Cedar Falls, of which 25.5% had children under the age of 18 living in them. Of all households, 45.8% were married-couple households, 21.1% were households with a male householder and no spouse or partner present, and 26.6% were households with a female householder and no spouse or partner present. About 30.6% of all households were made up of individuals and 12.2% had someone living alone who was 65 years of age or older.

There were 16,997 housing units, of which 6.9% were vacant. The homeowner vacancy rate was 1.8% and the rental vacancy rate was 8.5%.

Racial composition as of the 2020 census
Race	Number	Percent
White	35,639	87.5%
Black or African American	1,268	3.1%
American Indian and Alaska Native	65	0.2%
Asian	1,322	3.2%
Native Hawaiian and Other Pacific Islander	109	0.3%
Some other race	415	1.0%
Two or more races	1,895	4.7%
Hispanic or Latino (of any race)	1,165	2.9%

=== 2010 census ===
As of the census of 2010, there were 39,260 people, 14,608 households, and 8,091 families living in the city. The population density was 1,365.6 inhabitants per square mile (527.3/km^{2}). There were 15,477 housing units at an average density of 538.3 per square mile (207.8/km^{2}). The racial makeup of the city was 93.4% White, 2.1% African American, 0.2% Native American, 2.3% Asian, 0.5% from other races, and 1.7% from two or more races. Hispanic or Latino people of any race were 2.0% of the population.

There were 14,608 households, of which 24.8% had children under the age of 18 living with them, 45.5% were married couples living together, 7.2% had a female householder with no husband present, 2.7% had a male householder with no wife present, and 44.6% were non-families. 28.0% of all households were made up of individuals, and 10.4% had someone living alone who was 65 years of age or older. The average household size was 2.37 and the average family size was 2.88.

The median age in the city was 26.8 years. 17.3% of residents were under the age of 18; 29.7% were between the ages of 18 and 24; 20.5% were from 25 to 44; 20.1% were from 45 to 64; and 12.4% were 65 years of age or older. The gender makeup of the city was 48.1% male and 51.9% female.

=== 2000 census ===
As of the census of 2000, there were 36,145 people, 12,833 households, and 7,558 families living in the city. The population density was 1,277 people per square mile (493 people/km^{2}). There were 13,271 housing units at an average density of 469 per square mile (181/km^{2}). The racial makeup of the city was 95.14% White, 1.57% Black or African American, 0.15% Native American, 1.61% Asian, 0.02% Pacific Islander, 0.41% from other races, and 1.09% from two or more races. 1.08% of the population was Hispanic or Latino of any race.

There were 12,833 households, out of which 26.9% had children under the age of 18 living with them, 48.9% were married couples living together, 7.5% had a female householder with no husband present, and 41.1% were non-families. 25.5% of all households were made up of individuals, and 9.4% had someone living alone who was 65 years of age or older. The average household size was 2.45 and the average family size was 2.91.

Age spread: 18.0% under the age of 18, 30.6% from 18 to 24, 20.5% from 25 to 44, 19.0% from 45 to 64, and 11.9% who were 65 years of age or older. The median age was 26 years. For every 100 females, there were 88.5 males. For every 100 females age 18 and over, there were 85.7 males.

The median income for a household in the city was $70,226, and the median income for a family was $85,158. Males had a median income of $60,235 versus $50,312 for females. The per capita income for the city was $27,140. About 5.6% of families and 4.7% of the population were below the poverty line, including 8.5% of those under age 18, and 6.1% of those age 65 or over.

== Arts and culture ==
In 1986, the City of Cedar Falls established the Cedar Falls Art and Culture Board, which oversees the operation of the city's Cultural Division and the James & Meryl Hearst Center for the Arts.

=== Library ===
The Cedar Falls Public Library is housed in the Adele Whitenach Davis building located at 524 Main Street. The 47,000 square foot (4,400 m^{2}) structure, designed by Struxture Architects, replaced the Carniege-Dayton building in early 2004. As of the 2016 fiscal year, the library's holdings included approximately 8,000 audio materials, 12,000 video materials, and 104,000 books and periodicals, for a total of approximately 124,000 items. Patrons made 245,000 visits to take advantage of circulation services, adult, teen, and youth programming. Circulation of library materials for the fiscal year 2016 was 543,134. The library also provides public access to more than 30 public computers that provide internet access, office software suites, high-resolution color printing, Wi-Fi, and games. The library offers digital loaning through Libby, Hoopla, and other platforms.

The mission of the Cedar Falls Public Library is to promote literacy and provide open access to resources that facilitate lifelong learning. The library is a member of the Cedar Valley Library Consortium. Cedar Falls Public Library shares an Integrated Library System (SirsiDynix Symphony) with the Waterloo Public Library. Library management is provided by Kelly Stern, Director of the Cedar Falls Public Library.

=== Historical Society ===
The Cedar Falls Historical Society has its offices in the Victorian Home and Carriage House Museum. It preserves Cedar Falls' history through its five museums, collections, archives, and public programs. The society also operates the Cedar Falls Ice House, Little Red Schoolhouse, and Behrens-Rapp Station.

=== Retail ===
The city's major shopping mall is College Square Mall, built in 1969. The shopping mall was purchased by the family of John Davis and will be renamed The Mall at College Square.

=== Theatre ===
The Oster Regent Theatre in downtown Cedar Falls originally opened in 1910 as the Cotton Theatre. It is currently the home of the Cedar Falls Community Theatre, which was founded in 1978. The company produces seven or eight shows per season.

The Gallagher-Bluedorn Performing Arts Center on the University of Northern Iowa campus hosts many professionally touring Broadway plays and musicals throughout the year. The facility's Great Hall can seat 1,680 patrons.

== Education ==
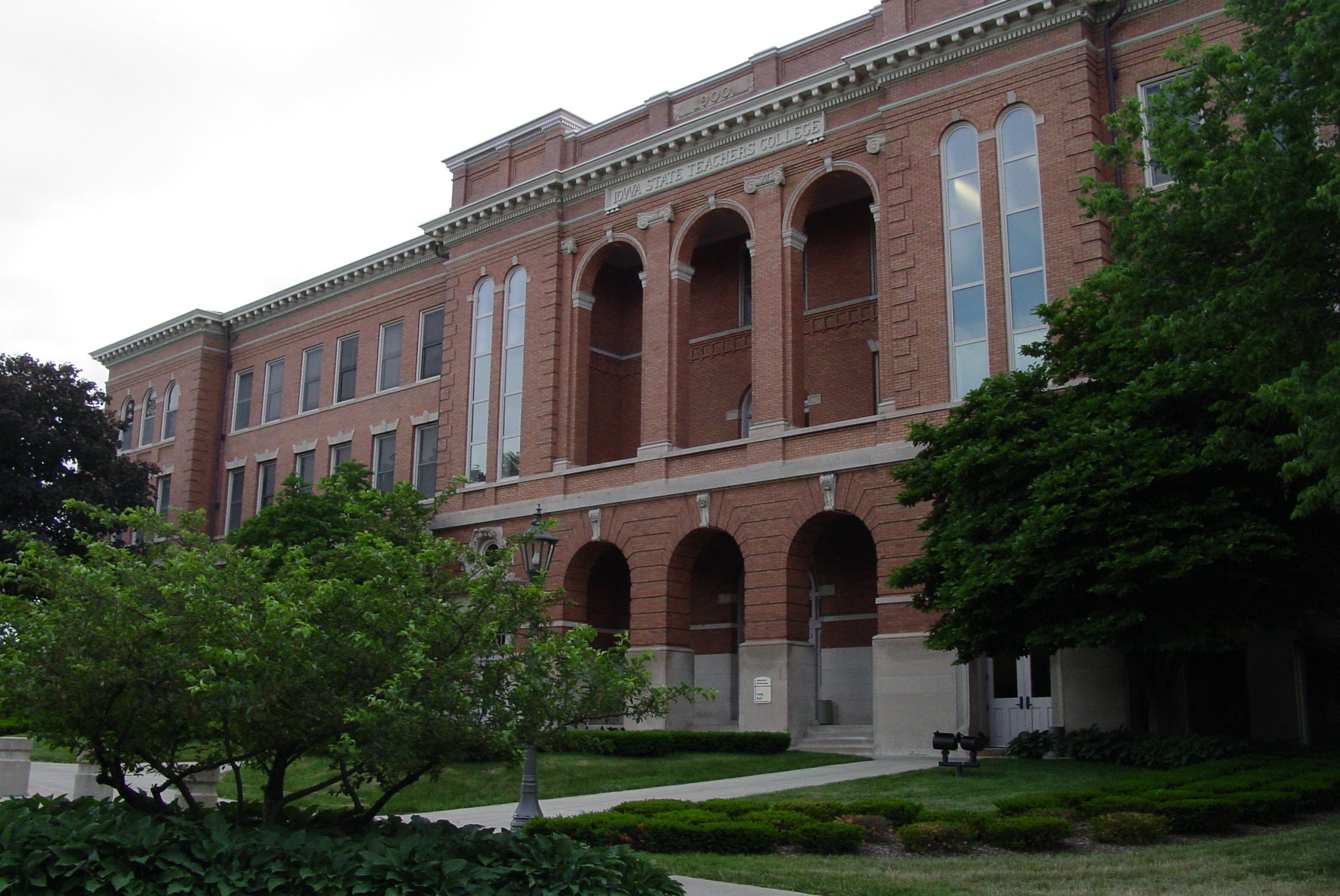
Lang Hall at University of Northern Iowa (UNI)

It hosts one of three public universities in Iowa, University of Northern Iowa (UNI).

Cedar Falls Community Schools, which covers most of the city limits, includes Cedar Falls High School, two junior high schools, seven elementary schools. Waterloo Community School District covers a small section of Cedar Falls. There is a private Christian school, Valley Lutheran High School. There is a private Catholic elementary school at St. Patrick Catholic Church, under the Roman Catholic Archdiocese of Dubuque. A significant renovation occurred beginning in May 2014.

The Malcolm Price Lab School/Northern University High School, was a state-funded K–12 school run by the university. It closed in 2012 following cuts at UNI.

== Utilities and internet access ==
The city owns its power, gas and water, and cable TV services. Because of this, Cedar Falls Utilities provides gigabit speeds to residents, becoming available on January 14, 2015. Cedar Falls has the power to do so because, unlike 19 other states, Iowa does not prohibit municipal broadband from competing with the private cable TV monopoly. In 2020, Cedar Falls Utilities was recognized by PC Magazine as having the nation's fastest internet, by a factor of three.

== Transportation ==
Cedar Falls has a bus service run by the Metropolitan Transit Authority of Black Hawk County. U.S. Highways 20, 63, and 218 provide access to the city. Air transportation is provided by Waterloo Regional Airport.

== Media ==
FM radio

- 88.1 KBBG
- 88.9 KWVI
- 89.5 KHKE
- 90.9 KUNI (FM)
- 92.3 KOEL-FM – licensed to Oelwein with main studios in Waterloo
- 93.5 KCVM
- 94.5 KULT-LP
- 97.7 KCRR – licensed to Grundy Center with main studios in Waterloo
- 98.5 KKHQ-FM
- 99.3 KWAY-FM – located in Waverly
- 101.9 KNWS-FM
- 105.1 KCFI
- 105.7 KOKZ
- 107.9 KFMW

AM radio

- 600 WMT – located in Cedar Rapids
- 640 WOI – located in Ames
- 950 KOEL – located in Oelwein
- 1040 WHO – located in Des Moines
- 1090 KNWS
- 1250 KCFI
- 1330 KPTY
- 1540 KXEL
- 1650 KCNZ

Broadcast television

- 2 KGAN (CBS, Fox on DT2) – located in Cedar Rapids
- 7 KWWL (NBC, Heroes & Icons on DT2, MeTV on DT3) – located in Waterloo
- 9 KCRG-TV (ABC, MyNetworkTV on DT2, The CW on DT3) – located in Cedar Rapids
- 12 KIIN (PBS/Iowa PBS) – located in Iowa City
- 20 KWKB (TCT, This TV on DT5) – located in Iowa City
- 28 KFXA (Dabl) – located in Cedar Rapids
- 32 KRIN (PBS/Iowa PBS) – located in Waterloo
- 40 KFXB-TV (CTN) – located in Dubuque
- 48 KPXR-TV (Ion) – located in Cedar Rapids

Print

- The Courier, daily newspaper
- The Cedar Falls Times, weekly newspaper
- The Cedar Valley What Not, weekly advertiser

Music

The underground music scene in the Cedar Falls area from 1977 to the present day is well documented. The Wartburg College Art Gallery in Waverly hosted a collaborative history of the bands, record labels, and music venues involved in the Cedar Falls music scene which ran from March 17 to April 14, 2007. This effort has been continued as a wiki-style website called "The Secret History of the Cedar Valley".

== Notable people ==
Actors

- Annabeth Gish – actress
- Gary Kroeger – actor, Saturday Night Live 1982–1985
- Michael Mosley – actor, Scrubs
- Mark Steines – co-host, Entertainment Tonight, alumnus of University of Northern Iowa

Athletes

- Trev Alberts – football player, former director of athletics at University of Nebraska-Omaha
- Isaac Boettger – NFL player
- Jack Campbell – NFL player, Linebacker for the Detroit Lions
- Don Denkinger – Major League Baseball umpire, made controversial call in 1985 World Series
- Travis Fulton – UFC fighter
- A. J. Green – NBA player for the Milwaukee Bucks
- David Johnson – running back for NFL's Arizona Cardinals, UNI alumnus
- Bryce Paup – NFL player, UNI alumnus
- Ross Pierschbacher – NFL player
- Chad Rinehart – NFL player, Boone High School, UNI
- Nick Ring – UFC fighter
- Edgar Seymour – Olympic bobsledder
- Terry Stotts – NBA player and coach
- Dedric Ward – NFL wide receiver, UNI alumnus
- Kurt Warner – NFL quarterback for St. Louis Rams, New York Giants and Arizona Cardinals

Military

- Robert Hibbs – Medal of Honor recipient

Musicians

- House of Large Sizes – alternative rock band
- Karen Holvik – classical soprano, currently on the faculty of the Eastman School of Music
- Nilo Hovey – instrumental music pedagogue, author of numerous instrument method books
- Bonnie Koloc – folk singer, songwriter and musician, born in Waterloo, Iowa, attended UNI
- Tracie Spencer – singer
- Spirit of the Stairway – mathcore band
- Bill Stewart – jazz drummer and composer, attended UNI

Politicians

- Marv Diemer – Iowa state legislator
- Charles Grassley – U.S. Senator, attended UNI
- Gil Gutknecht – former Minnesota congressman
- Roger Jepsen – former U.S. Senator

Scientists

- Gerald Guralnik – physicist, co-discoverer of the "Higgs Mechanism"

Writers

- Bess Streeter Aldrich (1881–1954) – novelist
- R.V. Cassill – novelist and short story writer
- James Hearst – poet, farmer, professor of creative writing at UNI
- Helen Markley Miller (1896–1984) – writer of historical and biographical fiction for children
- Ferner Nuhn (1903–1989) – literary critic, author, artist, Quaker activist
- Ruth Suckow Nuhn (1892–1960) – author of short stories and novels
- Nancy Price – author of Sleeping with the Enemy
- Leland Sage – professor at UNI and historian
- Robert James Waller – author of The Bridges of Madison County, attended UNI

Other

- Marc Andreessen – co-founder, Netscape Corporation, Andreessen Horowitz
- Raja Chari – astronaut
- Tim Dodd – STEM communicator and YouTube creator known as the "Everyday Astronaut"
- Adelia M. Hoyt (1865–1966) – Braille librarian, Library of Congress
- John H. Livingston – aviator and air racer
- Randy & Vicki Weaver – parents of John Deere employee, Ruby Ridge incident

== Sister cities ==
Cedar Falls' sister cities is:

- Ferizaj, Kosovo (2023)

== See also ==
- Black Hawk Hotel
- Cedar Falls Ice House
- Cedar Falls Utilities
- University of Northern Iowa Teaching and Research Greenhouse
