= KOEL-FM =

Country radio station in Oelwein, Iowa

- Oelwein, Iowa; United States
- Broadcast area: Waterloo-Cedar Falls
- Frequency: 92.3 MHz
- Branding: K92.3

Programming
- Format: Country
- Affiliations: Compass Media Networks

Ownership
- Owner: Townsquare Media; (Townsquare License, LLC)
- Sister stations: KCRR, KKHQ-FM, KOEL

History
- First air date: 1971
- Former call signs: KOEL-FM (1971–2003); KKHQ-FM (2003–2020)
- Call sign meaning: Oelwein

Technical information
- Licensing authority: FCC
- Facility ID: 28472
- Class: C0
- ERP: 95,000 watts
- HAAT: 302 meters (991 ft)
- Transmitter coordinates: 42.681°N 91.881°W

Links
- Public license information: Public file; LMS
- Webcast: Listen Live
- Website: k923.fm

KOEL-FM (92.3 MHz, "K92.3") is a radio station serving Waterloo, Cedar Falls, and the surrounding area known as the Cedar Valley with a country music format. The station is owned by Townsquare Media.

== History ==
Before the 92.3 frequency was acquired by Cumulus Media from Connoisseur Media in 2000, the station was country music-formatted KOEL-FM. This format flip also happened to other stations Cumulus acquired from Connoisseur, including KBEA in the Quad Cities market, which had been a country station.

Before the flip to Top 40/CHR on September 22, 2003, the only other stations in the Waterloo/Cedar Falls Area that carried the format were distant and somewhat weak signals, including Cedar Rapids' KZIA and Waverly's KWAY-FM. Although Waverly is considered part of the Waterloo/Cedar Falls Designated Market Area, KWAY's 4,600 watt signal was not the strongest. In addition, while KZIA broadcasts with 100,000 watts of power, their transmitter is located about 50 miles away. With the flip to CHR, the country format and KOEL-FM call sign moved to 98.5 MHz, replacing the similarly formatted KKCV, "98.5 The Hog"; simultaneously, 92.3 would adopt the KKHQ-FM call letters.

On August 30, 2013, a deal was announced in which Townsquare Media would acquire 53 Cumulus stations, including KKHQ-FM, for $238 million. The deal was part of Cumulus' acquisition of Dial Global; Townsquare and Dial Global are both controlled by Oaktree Capital Management. The sale to Townsquare was completed on November 14, 2013; KKHQ-FM was one of three stations (along with KCRR and KOEL-FM) that were placed in a divestiture trust for eventual resale within two years. In December 2016, the Federal Communications Commission approved Townsquare's request to reacquire the stations from the divestiture trust.

On December 9, 2020, KKHQ-FM and KOEL-FM swapped frequencies, bringing the KOEL-FM call letters and the country format back to 92.3 FM after 17 years. The station was rebranded as "K92.3".

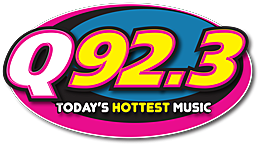
Former logo
