= KKHQ-FM =

Radio station in Cedar Falls, Iowa

Coordinates: 42.442°N 92.397°W

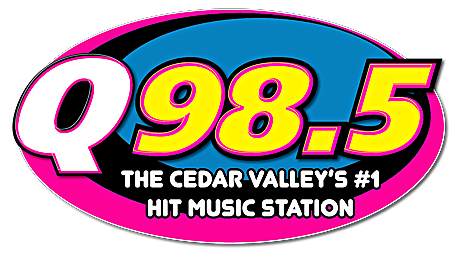
- Cedar Falls, Iowa; United States
- Broadcast area: Waterloo-Cedar Falls
- Frequency: 98.5 MHz
- Branding: Q98.5

Programming
- Format: Top 40 (CHR)
- Affiliations: Compass Media Networks; Premiere Networks

Ownership
- Owner: Townsquare Media; (Townsquare License, LLC)
- Sister stations: KCRR, KOEL, KOEL-FM

History
- First air date: January 7, 1994 (as KKCV)
- Former call signs: KKCV (1993–2003), KOEL (2003); KOEL-FM (2003–2020)
- Call sign meaning: The Q in KKHQ is used for the "Q98.5" branding

Technical information
- Licensing authority: FCC
- Facility ID: 66780
- Class: C3
- ERP: 15,000 watts
- HAAT: 129 meters (423 ft)

Links
- Public license information: Public file; LMS
- Webcast: Listen Live
- Website: q985.fm

KKHQ-FM (98.5 MHz), branded as Q98.5, is a radio station serving Waterloo, Cedar Falls, and surrounding cities with a Top 40/CHR format. This station is owned by Townsquare Media.

== History ==
KKCV signed on the air on January 7, 1994, and aired a country format branded as "The Hog." The station would later rebrand as "K98.5." On September 22, 2003, the country formats of KKCV and KOEL-FM were merged on the 98.5 FM frequency, along with the KOEL-FM call letters, as the latter flipped to Top 40/CHR format as "Q92.3."

On August 30, 2013, a deal was announced in which Townsquare Media would acquire 53 Cumulus stations, including the then-KOEL-FM, for $238 million. The deal was part of Cumulus' acquisition of Dial Global; Townsquare and Dial Global are both controlled by Oaktree Capital Management. The sale to Townsquare was completed on November 14, 2013; KOEL-FM was one of three stations (along with KCRR and KKHQ-FM) that were placed in a divestiture trust for eventual resale within two years. In December 2016, the Federal Communications Commission approved Townsquare's request to reacquire the stations from the divestiture trust.

On December 9, 2020, KOEL-FM and KKHQ-FM swapped frequencies, bringing the KOEL-FM call letters and the country format back to 92.3 FM after 17 years. In return, KKHQ-FM's Top 40/CHR format moved to 98.5 and rebranded as "Q98.5".
