= KOEL (AM) =

US radio station serving Waterloo, Cedar Falls and surrounding cities

Coordinates: 42°39′21″N 91°54′02″W

- Oelwein, Iowa; United States
- Broadcast area: Waterloo-Cedar Falls area
- Frequency: 950 kHz
- Branding: AM 950 KOEL

Programming
- Format: News/talk/classic country
- Affiliations: ABC News Radio; Fox News Radio; Compass Media Networks; Salem Radio Network; Westwood One

Ownership
- Owner: Townsquare Media; (Townsquare License, LLC)
- Sister stations: KCRR, KKHQ-FM, KOEL-FM

History
- First air date: February 7, 1951 (first license granted)
- Call sign meaning: Oelwein

Technical information
- Licensing authority: FCC
- Facility ID: 28475
- Class: B
- Power: 5,000 watts day 500 watts night

Links
- Public license information: Public file; LMS
- Webcast: Listen Live
- Website: koel.com

KOEL (950 kHz) is an AM radio station serving Waterloo, Cedar Falls and surrounding cities with a news/talk format. The station is under the ownership of Townsquare Media. Despite different owners and affiliations, KOEL and KWWL maintain a strong partnership.

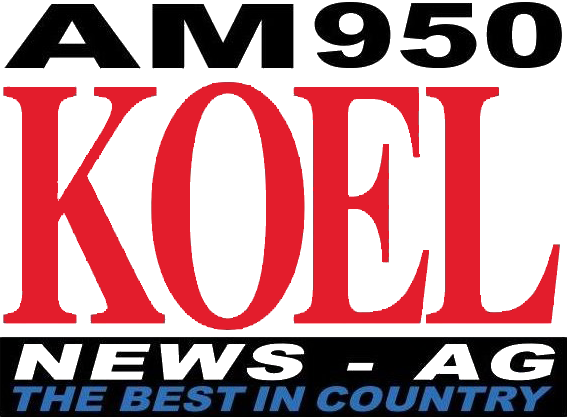
Former logo

On August 30, 2013, a deal was announced in which Townsquare would acquire 53 Cumulus Media stations, including KOEL, for $238 million. The deal was part of Cumulus' acquisition of Dial Global; Townsquare and Dial Global are both controlled by Oaktree Capital Management. The sale to Townsquare was completed on November 14, 2013.

== Programming ==
On weekdays, KOEL broadcasts news/talk programming as well as local agriculture business, sports reports, community calendar, lunch specials and stock market reports, with ABC News Radio broadcast on the hour, along with Oelwein Huskies play by play.

At weekends, KOEL has brief news breaks from ABC News Radio with home improvement tips, field and stream radio, and classic country music (when not in special programming mode).

== Staff ==
- Roger King - News Director/Farm Director
- Johnny Marks - Brand Manager
