= Swati Dandekar =

American politician (born 1951)

Swati A. Dandekar
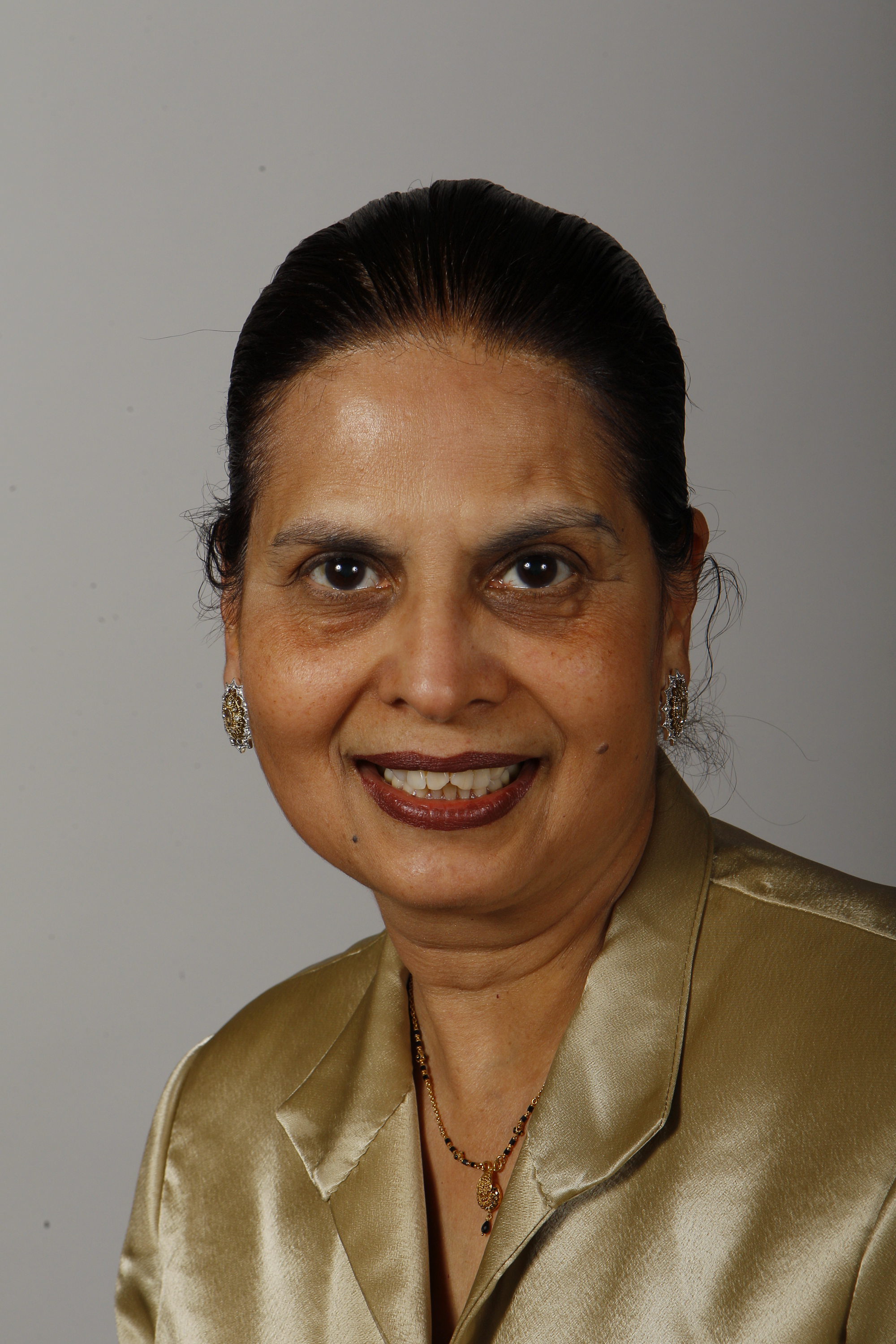
- Dandekar in 2011

Member of the Iowa Senate from the 18th district
- In office January 12, 2009 – September 16, 2011
- Preceded by: Mary Lundby
- Succeeded by: Liz Mathis

Member of the Iowa House of Representatives from the 36th district
- In office January 13, 2003 – January 12, 2009
- Preceded by: Pat Murphy
- Succeeded by: Nick Wagner

Personal details
- Born: March 6, 1951 (age 75) Nagpur, India
- Party: Democratic
- Spouse: Arvind
- Children: Ajai and Govind
- Education: Nagpur University; Mumbai University
- Website: Dandekar's website

Swati Arvind Dandekar (born March 6, 1951) is a former Iowa state legislator and former U.S. Executive Director at the Asian Development Bank. A member of the Democratic Party, she served in the Iowa House of Representatives for the 36th District from 2003 to 2009 and in the Iowa Senate for the 18th District from 2009 to 2011. She is the first Indian American to serve in the Iowa legislature.

== Early life and education ==
Swati Arvind Dandekar was born on March 6, 1951, in Nagpur, India. She graduated from J. N. Tata Pasi Girls' High School in Nagpur, and received a Bachelor of Science in chemistry and biology from Nagpur University and a postgraduate degree in dietetics from the University of Mumbai. She immigrated to Marion, Iowa, in 1973.

== Political history ==
Before her election to the Iowa General Assembly, Dandekar was a two-term member of the Linn-Mar Community School District Board from 1996 to 2002. During that time, Governor Tom Vilsack appointed her to the Vision Iowa Board, a post she held from 2000 to 2002. She began her legislative career in 2002, winning an election to the Iowa House District 36, defeating Republican Karen Balderston. She won re-election twice, against Republican Cory Crowly in 2004 and Republican Nick Wagner in 2006, before running for the Iowa Senate. In 2008, Dandekar defeated Republican Joe Childers for election to Iowa Senate District 18, and served there until resigning in 2011 to accept Governor Terry Branstad's appointment to the Iowa Utilities Board. She served as commissioner of the board until 2013, when she resigned to run for Congress.

While in the House, Dandekar served on the Appropriations, Economic Growth, and Economic Development Appropriations Subcommittee during all three terms, and served on the Education committee during her first term and the Transportation committee during her third term. While in the Senate, she served on the Commerce, Economic Growth, Rebuild Iowa, Transportation, and Ways and Means committees, while reprising her role as a member of the Economic Development Appropriations Subcommittee.

On July 23, 2013, Dandekar announced that she would be running for the US House of Representatives from the 1st congressional district; she lost in the primary to former state house speaker Pat Murphy, who himself lost to Rod Blum.

In 2015, President Barack Obama nominated Dandekar to serve as the U.S. Executive Director to the Asian Development Bank with the rank of ambassador. She was confirmed by the Senate in May 2016, and served until 2017.

Dandekar has served as the president and chairperson of the National Foundation for Women Legislators and as a board member of the Iowa Math and Science Coalition, the Greater Cedar Rapids Foundation, and the Belin-Blank International Center for Gifted & Talented. She also served as a board member for the Iowa Association of School Boards, the Iowa Charter of Women in Public Policy, and the U.S. Center for Citizen Diplomacy.

== Personal life ==
Dandekar married her husband Arvind, a businessman, in 1973. They have two adult sons, one of whom is a medical doctor while the other is an economist and computer scientist.

Dandekar is fluent in English, Hindi, Gujarati, and Marathi, and has working knowledge in Urdu, Punjabi, and Bengali.

Dandekar resides in Marion, Iowa, where she operates a consulting firm.

== Recognition ==
Dandekar has received several awards, including the J. C. Penney Education Golden Rule award, the 2003 Pillar of the Community award from Waypoint, recognition as a 2004 Flemming Institute Fellow and recognition by the Elliott School of International Affairs' Global Economic Conference. In addition, she has been named Person of the Year three times, once in 2002 by India Abroad, once in 2003 by the Asian Alliance of Iowa, and once in 2008 by AsianWeek.

During her 2014 campaign for the Iowa 1st Congressional District Democratic primary, Dandekar was formally endorsed by the National Organization for Women.

== Electoral history ==
| Election | Political result | Candidate | Party | Votes | % |
|---|---|---|---|---|---|
| Iowa House of Representatives elections, 2002; District 36; Turnout: 11,794 | Democratic (newly redistricted) | Swati A. Dandekar | Democratic | 6,770 | 57.5 |
| Iowa House of Representatives elections, 2002; District 36; Turnout: 11,794 | Democratic (newly redistricted) | Karen Balderston | Republican | 5,000 | 42.4 |
| Iowa House of Representatives elections, 2004; District 36; Turnout: 18,071 | Democratic hold | Swati A. Dandekar | Democratic | 9,843 | 54.5 |
| Iowa House of Representatives elections, 2004; District 36; Turnout: 18,071 | Democratic hold | Cory Crowley | Republican | 8,220 | 45.5 |
| Iowa House of Representatives elections, 2006; District 36; Turnout: 13,293 | Democratic hold | Swati A. Dandekar | Democratic | 6,987 | 52.6 |
| Iowa House of Representatives elections, 2006; District 36; Turnout: 13,293 | Democratic hold | Nick Wagner | Republican | 6,302 | 47.4 |
| Iowa Senate elections, 2008; District 18; Turnout: 39,752 | Democratic hold | Swati A. Dandekar | Democratic | 20,667 | 52.0 |
| Iowa Senate elections, 2008; District 18; Turnout: 39,752 | Democratic hold | Joe Childers | Republican | 17,367 | 43.7 |

Iowa House of Representatives
| Preceded by Pat Murphy | Member of the Iowa House of Representatives for the 36th District; 2003 – 2009 | Succeeded by Nick Wagner |
Iowa Senate
| Preceded by Mary Lundby | Member of the Iowa State Senate for the 18th District; 2009 – 2011 | Succeeded by Liz Mathis |
