= IUB =

IUB stands for the name of several different universities:

- The Islamia University of Bahawalpur, Punjab, Pakistan
- Islamic University of Bangladesh, Kushtia, Bangladesh
- Independent University, Bangladesh, Dhaka, Bangladesh
- Indiana University Bloomington, Indiana, USA
- International University Bremen, the former name of Jacobs University Bremen in Bremen, Germany

Also:

- Iowa Utilities Board
- The former acronym of the International Union of Biochemistry and Molecular Biology (now IUBMB)
