= Richard W. Lozier Jr. =

American lawyer

Richard W. Lozier Jr. is an American lawyer. He worked for a lobby group representing the application for the Bakken pipeline. He was a commissioner of the Iowa Utilities Board (IUB).

== Career ==
Since 1969, Lozier has worked at Belin Lamson McCormick Zumbach Flynn, law firm, Iowa.

He represented the Midwest Alliance for Infrastructure Now (MAIN Coalition), a lobby group in the Dakota Access application for the Bakken pipeline.

In 2017, then governor Terry Branstad appointed him as a member of the Iowa Utilities Board. He was subsequently asked to recuse himself for conflict of interest. In June 2017, Lozier recused himself, leaving only two committee members to vote on matters. Lozier's IUB term expired in May 2023. As he was appointed by Branstad, who has been working for the Summit Agricultural Group, which is seeking a permit for carbon capture pipeline to North Dakota he had a perceived conflict of interest, but critics noted he "at least had an open mind about this case".
