= Iowa's 36th House of Representatives district =

American legislative district

House District 36
- Type: District of the Lower house
- Location: Iowa
- Representative: Austin Baeth
- Parent organization: Iowa General Assembly

The 36th District of the Iowa House of Representatives in the state of Iowa is part of Polk County.

== Representatives ==
The district has been represented by:

- Elizabeth Ruby Miller, 1971–1973
- Mary O'Halloran, 1973–1979
- Marv Diemer, 1979–1983
- Thomas J. Jochum, 1983–1993
- Pat Murphy, 1993–2003
- Swati Dandekar, 2003–2009
- Nick Wagner, 2009–2013
- Marti Anderson, 2013–2023
- Austin Baeth, 2023-
