= Josh Byrnes (politician) =

American politician (born 1974)

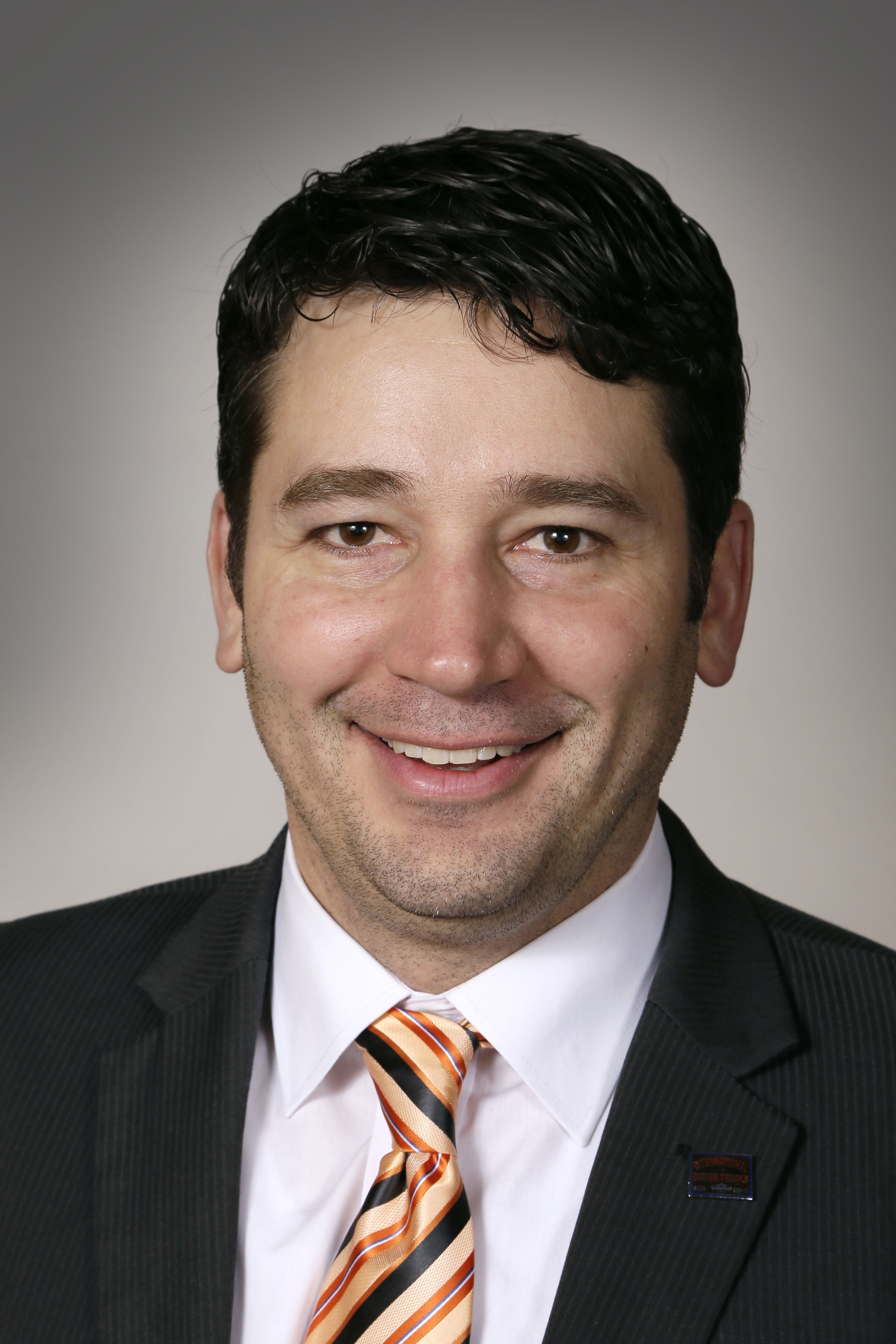

Member of the Iowa House of Representatives
- Incumbent
- Assumed office January 10, 2011
- Preceded by: Mark Kuhn
- Constituency: 14th district (2011–2013); 51st district (2013–present)

Personal details
- Born: April 18, 1974 (age 52) Oelwein, Iowa, U.S.
- Party: Republican
- Spouse: Colleen
- Children: 3 children
- Education: Luther College, Winona State University
- Profession: Iowa Utilities Board
- Website: legis.iowa.gov/...

Josh Byrnes (born April 18, 1974) is an American politician who served in the Iowa House of Representatives from 2010 until 2016. In November 2020, Iowa governor Kim Reynolds appointed him to the Iowa Utilities Board until April 30, 2025. Byrnes is a member of the Republican Party.

== Early life and education ==
Byrnes was born in Oelwein, Iowa. He grew up in Riceville, Iowa, where he graduated from Riceville Community High School in 1992. He went on to graduate from Luther College, earned a master's degree from Winona State University.

== Career ==
Byrnes was a high school teacher for eight and a half years and also served as an administrator at the community college level. Byrnes taught or coached in the districts of Denison, Osage, Riceville, Mason City, St. Ansgar, and Clear Lake.

In 2010, Byrnes, member of the Republican party was first elected to the Iowa House of Representatives. As of January 2013, Byrnes served on several committees in the Iowa House – the Education, Natural Resources, and Ways and Means committees, as well as the Education Appropriations budget subcommittee. He served as the Chair of the Transportation committee. He was defeated in 2016.

In November 2020, Iowa governor Kim Reynolds appointed him to the Iowa Utilities Board until April 30, 2025.

== Personal life ==
Byrnes resides on an acreage in Mitchell County with his wife, Colleen, daughters, Alexandra and Scarlett, and son, Nolan. Colleen is a family nurse practitioner at the Mitchell County Regional Hospital and has received numerous prestigious awards for her work. The family enjoys their acreage where they have a small cow calf herd, raise gourds and play ball on their diamond.

== Service ==
According to the IUB website he was General Manager of Osage Municipal Utilities, a former CUSB Bank director and served on the Iowa Association of Municipal Utilities Board of Directors, American Public Power Associations DEED Board, and T&D World Executive Advisory Board.

== Electoral history ==
*incumbent

Election	Political result	Candidate	Party	Votes	%
Iowa House of Representatives primary elections, 2010; District 14; Turnout: 1,984	Republican	Josh Byrnes	Republican	1,297	65.37%
Iowa House of Representatives primary elections, 2010; District 14; Turnout: 1,984	Republican	Craig Clark	Republican	386	19.46%
Iowa House of Representatives general elections, 2010; District 14; Turnout: 11,283	Republican gain from Democratic	Josh Byrnes	Republican	6,696	59.35%
Iowa House of Representatives general elections, 2010; District 14; Turnout: 11,283	Republican gain from Democratic	Kurt Meyer	Democratic	4,281	37.94%
Iowa House of Representatives primary elections, 2012; District 51	Republican	Josh Byrnes*	Republican	unopposed	
Iowa House of Representatives general elections, 2012; District 51; Turnout: 15,779	Republican (newly redistricted)	Josh Byrnes*	Republican	9,714	61.56%
Iowa House of Representatives general elections, 2012; District 51; Turnout: 15,779	Republican (newly redistricted)	Eric Hungerford	Democratic	5,324	33.74%

Iowa House of Representatives
Preceded by Mark Kuhn	14th District; 2011–2013	Succeeded by David Dawson
Preceded by Dan Muhlbauer	51st District; 2013–present	Succeeded by Incumbent
