= Kim Pearson =

American politician (born 1962)

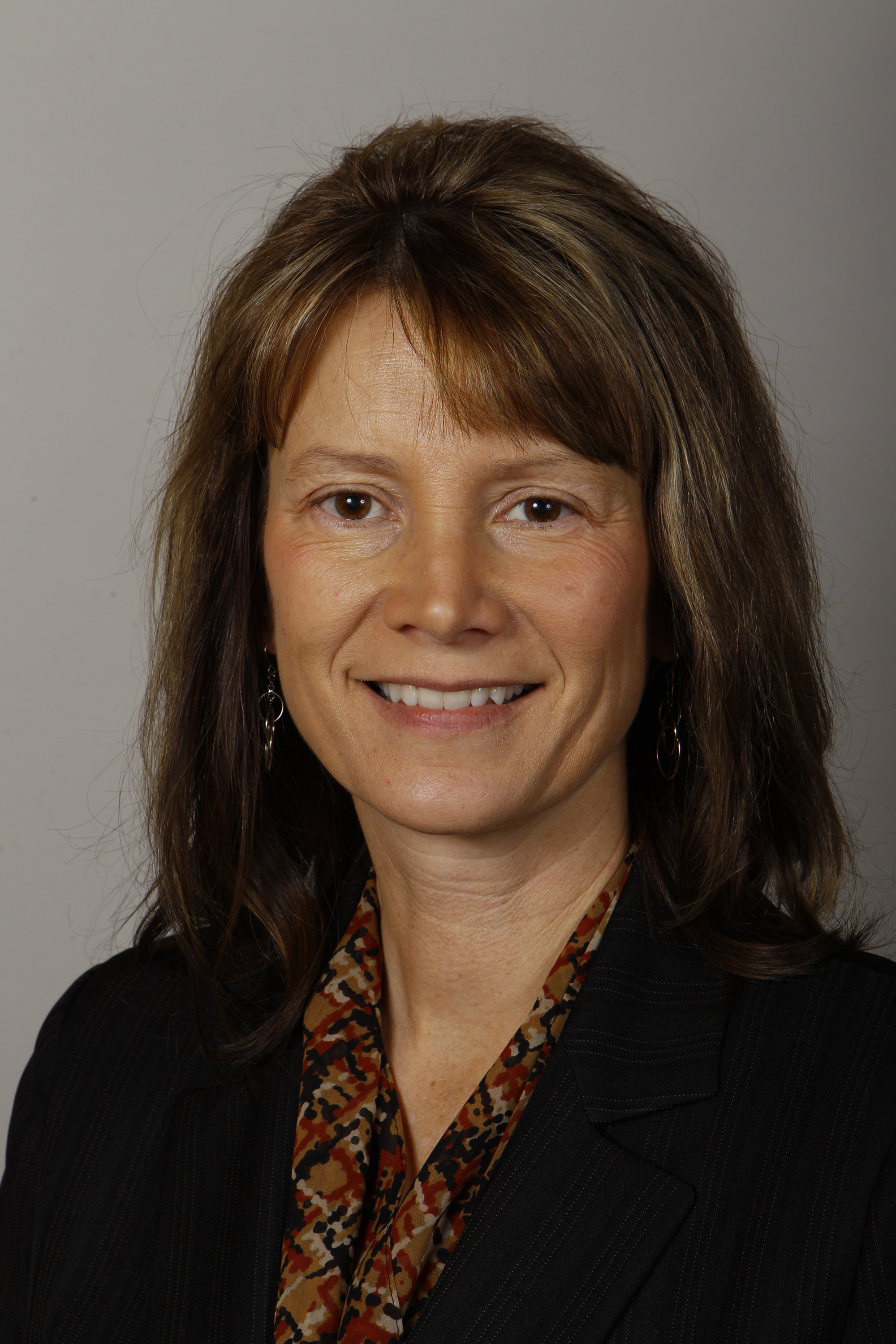

Member of the Iowa House of Representatives from the 42nd district
- In office January 10, 2011 – January 13, 2013
- Preceded by: Geri Huser

Personal details
- Born: October 18, 1962 (age 63) Osmond, Nebraska
- Party: Republican
- Spouse: Bryan
- Children: Morgan and Monica
- Occupation: Attorney
- Website: Pearson's website

Kim L. Pearson (born October 18, 1962) is a former Republican Iowa State Representative from the 42nd District. She served one term in the Iowa House of Representatives from 2011 to 2013. She was born in Nebraska and raised in Iowa.

Pearson served on several committees in the Iowa House — the Education, Education Oversight, Education Oversight (Joint), Human Resources, and Transportation committees. She also served as the vice chair of the Judiciary Committee.

In 2011, she endorsed Republican presidential candidate Ron Paul.

== Electoral history ==
*incumbent

Election	Political result	Candidate	Party	Votes	%
Iowa House of Representatives primary elections, 2010; District 42; Turnout: 3,044	Republican	Kim Pearson	Republican	1,881	61.8
Iowa House of Representatives primary elections, 2010; District 42; Turnout: 3,044	Republican	Aaron Levi Warner II	Republican	577	19.0
Iowa House of Representatives elections, 2010; District 42; Turnout: 14,748	Republican gain from Democratic	Kim Pearson	Republican	6,975	47.3
Iowa House of Representatives elections, 2010; District 42; Turnout: 14,748	Republican gain from Democratic	Geri Huser*	Democratic	6,849	46.4
Iowa House of Representatives elections, 2010; District 42; Turnout: 14,748	Republican gain from Democratic	Dan Nieland	Independent	522	3.5

Iowa House of Representatives
Preceded by Geri Huser	42nd District; 2011–2013	Succeeded by Peter Cownie
