= Libby Jacobs =

American politician (born 1956)

Libby Swanson Jacobs
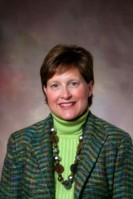

Member of the Iowa House of Representatives from the 60th district
- In office January 13, 2003 – January 11, 2009
- Preceded by: Lance Horbach
- Succeeded by: Peter Cownie

Member of the Iowa House of Representatives from the 74th district
- In office January 9, 1995 – January 12, 2003
- Preceded by: Dorothy F. Carpenter
- Succeeded by: Mark Davitt

Personal details
- Born: October 1, 1956 (age 69) Lincoln, Nebraska, U.S.
- Party: Republican
- Spouse: Steven
- Website: Jacobs's website

Libby Swanson Jacobs (born October 1, 1956) is a former Iowa State Representative from the 60th District.

== Education ==
Jacobs received her BA in political science from the University of Nebraska–Lincoln and her MPA from Drake University.

== Career ==
Prior to her career in politics, Jacobs was president of a consulting firm called The Jacobs Group, LLC. She also spent some time in the telecommunications, non-profit, and financial services industries.

She served in the Iowa House of Representatives from 1995 to 2009. She was a majority whip and sat on several committees: the Commerce committee; the Judiciary committee; the State Government committee; and the Ways and Means committee. Jacobs was re-elected in 2006 with 7,849 votes, running unopposed.

As a member of the Iowa Utilities Board, she voted in June 2016 alongside Nick Wagner in favor and against Chairwoman Geri Huser to allow the controversial construction of the Bakken pipeline to continue.

== Awards and honors ==
Jacobs has won a number of awards which include:

- West Des Moines Citizen of the Year (2008)
- Drake University Outstanding Master of Public Administration Alumnus Award (2008)
- Greater Des Moines Leadership Institute Business Leadership Award (2008),
- Iowa Grocers Association Legislative Leadership Award (2005)
- Des Moines Business Record Woman of Influence (2001)

== Family ==
Jacobs is married to her husband Steve and together they have two daughters. They reside in West Des Moines.

Iowa House of Representatives
Preceded by Dorothy F. Carpenter	74th District; 1995 – 2003	Succeeded by Mark Davitt
Preceded by Lance Horbach	60th District; 2003 – 2009	Succeeded by Peter Cownie
