= Peter Cownie =

American politician (born 1980)

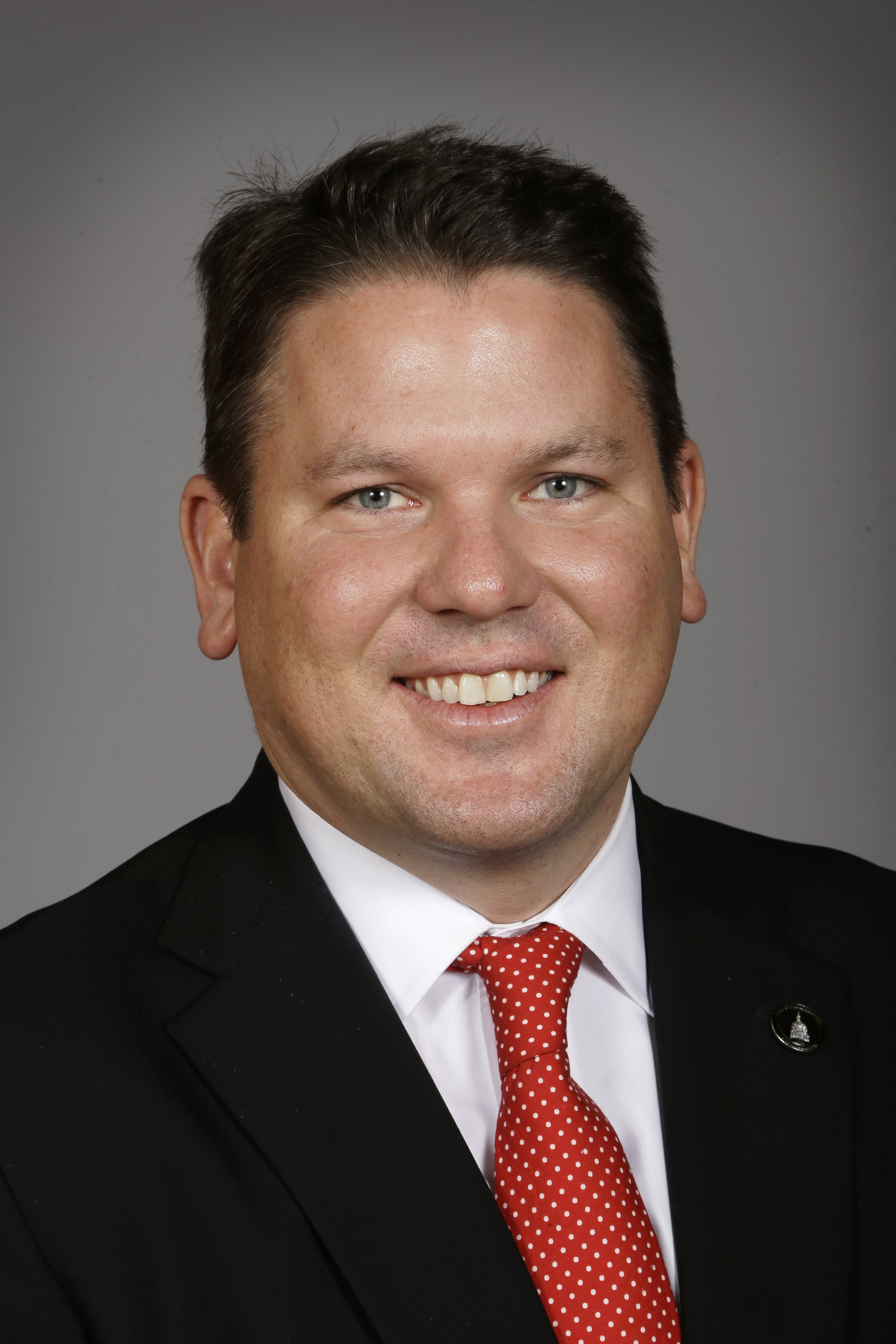

Member of the Iowa House of Representatives from the 42nd district 60th (2009–2013)
- In office January 12, 2009 – January 14, 2019
- Preceded by: Libby Jacobs
- Succeeded by: Kristin Sunde

Personal details
- Born: April 19, 1980 (age 46) Des Moines, Iowa, U.S.
- Party: Republican
- Spouse: Mary
- Education: University of Virginia (BA); Drake University (MPA)
- Occupation: Blue Ribbon foundation President,Iowa state Fair
- Website: legis.iowa.gov/...

Peter Cownie (born April 19, 1980) is an American politician.

Cownie was born and raised in Des Moines, Iowa and resides in West Des Moines, Iowa. He has a B.A. in American government from the University of Virginia and a Master's of Public Administration with an emphasis in public policy from Drake University. He is a Republican Party member who served on the Iowa House of Representatives from 2009 to 2019. Until 2013, Cownie held the District 60 seat. He was subsequently redistricted to District 42.

Cownie's mother Patricia was appointed to the Iowa Board of Regents in 2015 by Governor Terry Branstad. During her tenure, Patricia Cownie served as president pro term. Branstad's successor Kim Reynolds did not nominate Patricia Cownie to a second term.

== Electoral history ==
*incumbent

Election	Political result	Candidate	Party	Votes	%
Iowa House of Representatives primary elections, 2008; District 60	Republican	Peter Cownie	Republican	unopposed	
Iowa House of Representatives general elections, 2008; District 60; Turnout: 17,321	Republican hold	Peter Cownie	Republican	8,905	51.41%
Iowa House of Representatives general elections, 2008; District 60; Turnout: 17,321	Republican hold	Alan R. Koslow	Democratic	6,874	39.69%
Iowa House of Representatives general elections, 2008; District 60; Turnout: 17,321	Republican hold	Russ Gibson	Libertarian	499	2.88%
Iowa House of Representatives primary elections, 2010; District 60	Republican	Peter Cownie*	Republican	unopposed	
Iowa House of Representatives general elections, 2010; District 60; Turnout: 12,739	Republican hold	Peter Cownie*	Republican	7,761	60.92%
Iowa House of Representatives general elections, 2010; District 60; Turnout: 12,739	Republican hold	Alan R. Koslow	Democratic	4,333	34.01%
Iowa House of Representatives primary elections, 2012; District 42	Republican	Peter Cownie*	Republican	unopposed	
Iowa House of Representatives general elections, 2012; District 42; Turnout: 18,030	Republican (newly redistricted)	Peter Cownie*	Republican	9,581	53.14%
Iowa House of Representatives general elections, 2012; District 42; Turnout: 18,030	Republican (newly redistricted)	Mike McRee	Democratic	7,341	40.72%
Iowa House of Representatives primary elections, 2014; District 42	Republican	Peter Cownie*	Republican	unopposed	
Iowa House of Representatives general elections, 2014; District 42; Turnout: 12,958	Republican	Peter Cownie*	Republican	7,419	57.25%
Iowa House of Representatives general elections, 2014; District 42; Turnout: 12,958	Republican	Daniel Fessler	Democratic	4,911	37.90%
Iowa House of Representatives primary elections, 2016; District 42	Republican	Peter Cownie*	Republican	unopposed	
Iowa House of Representatives general elections, 2016; District 42; Turnout: 17,720	Republican	Peter Cownie*	Republican	9,065	51.16%
Iowa House of Representatives general elections, 2016; District 42; Turnout: 17,720	Republican	Claire Celsi	Democratic	7,948	44.85%
Iowa House of Representatives primary elections, 2018; District 42	Republican	Peter Cownie*	Republican	unopposed	
Iowa House of Representatives general elections, 2018; District 42; Turnout: 15,511	Democratic	Kristin Sunde	Democratic	8,346	53.8%
Iowa House of Representatives general elections, 2018; District 42; Turnout: 15,511	Democratic	Peter Cownie*	Republican	7,155	46.1%

Iowa House of Representatives
Preceded by Libby Jacobs	60th District; 2009–2013	Succeeded by Walt Rogers
Preceded by Kim Pearson	42nd District; 2013–present	Succeeded by Incumbent
