= Kristin Sunde =

American politician

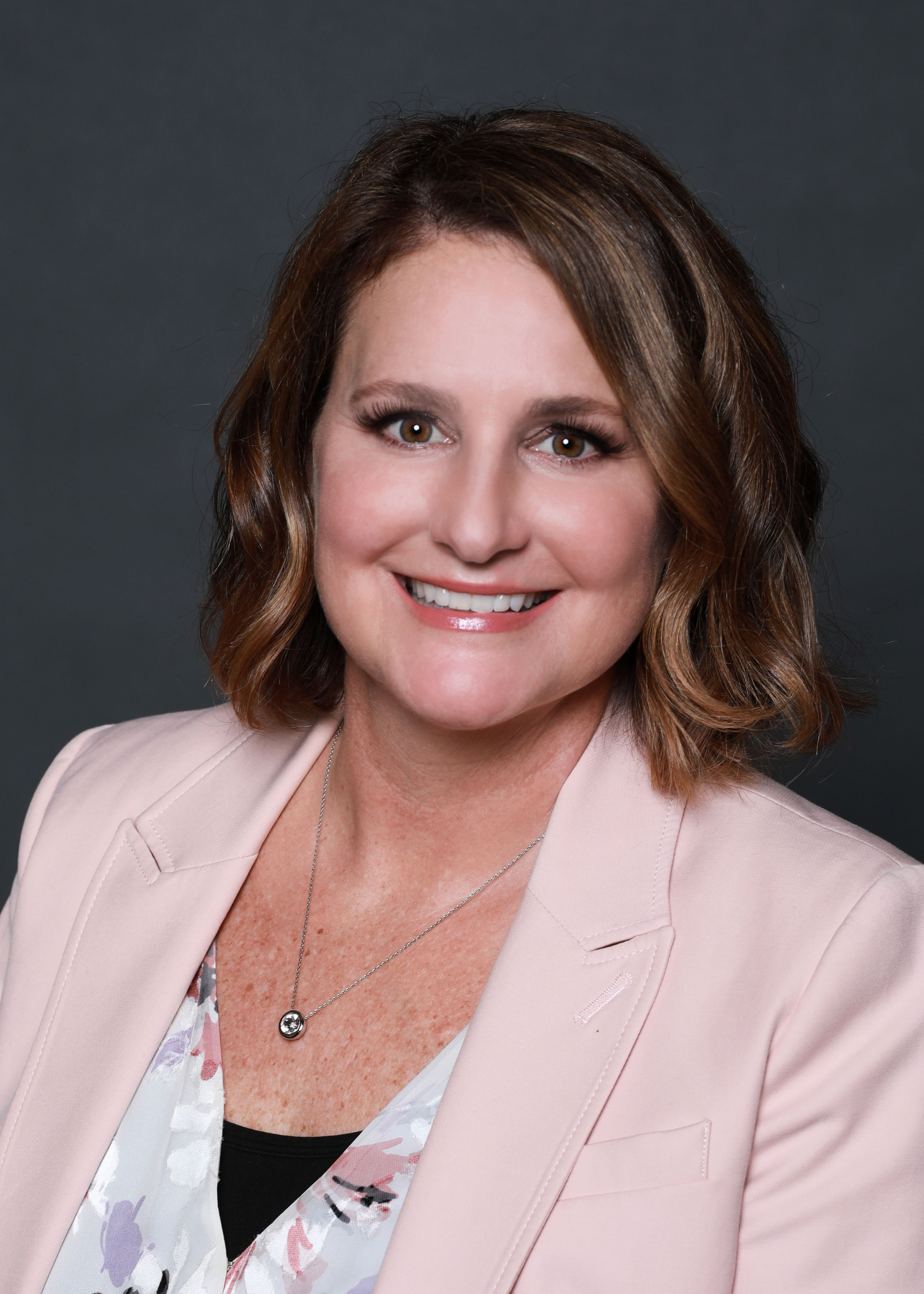

Member of the Iowa House of Representatives from the 42nd district
- In office January 14, 2019 – January 9, 2023
- Preceded by: Peter Cownie
- Succeeded by: Heather Matson (redistricting)

Personal details
- Born: St. Paul, Minnesota, U.S.
- Party: Democratic
- Spouse: Matt
- Children: 1
- Education: University of Northern Iowa
- Website: www.sundeforiowa.com

Kristin Sunde is a former Democratic member of the Iowa House of Representatives who represented District 42 from 2019 to 2023.

== Political career ==
Sunde was elected to the Iowa House of Representatives in 2018, defeating District 42 incumbent Peter Cownie. She currently sits on the following committees:

- Human Resources
- Public Safety
- Transportation

Sunde endorsed Pete Buttigieg in the 2020 Democratic presidential primaries.

== Electoral record ==
2018 general election: Iowa House of Representatives, District 42
| Party | Candidate | Votes | % |
|---|---|---|---|
| Democratic | Krisin Sunde | 8,346 | 53.8% |
| Republican | Peter Cownie | 7,155 | 46.1% |
| | Other/Write-in votes | 10 | 0.1% |
