= Austin Baeth =

American politician (born 1984)

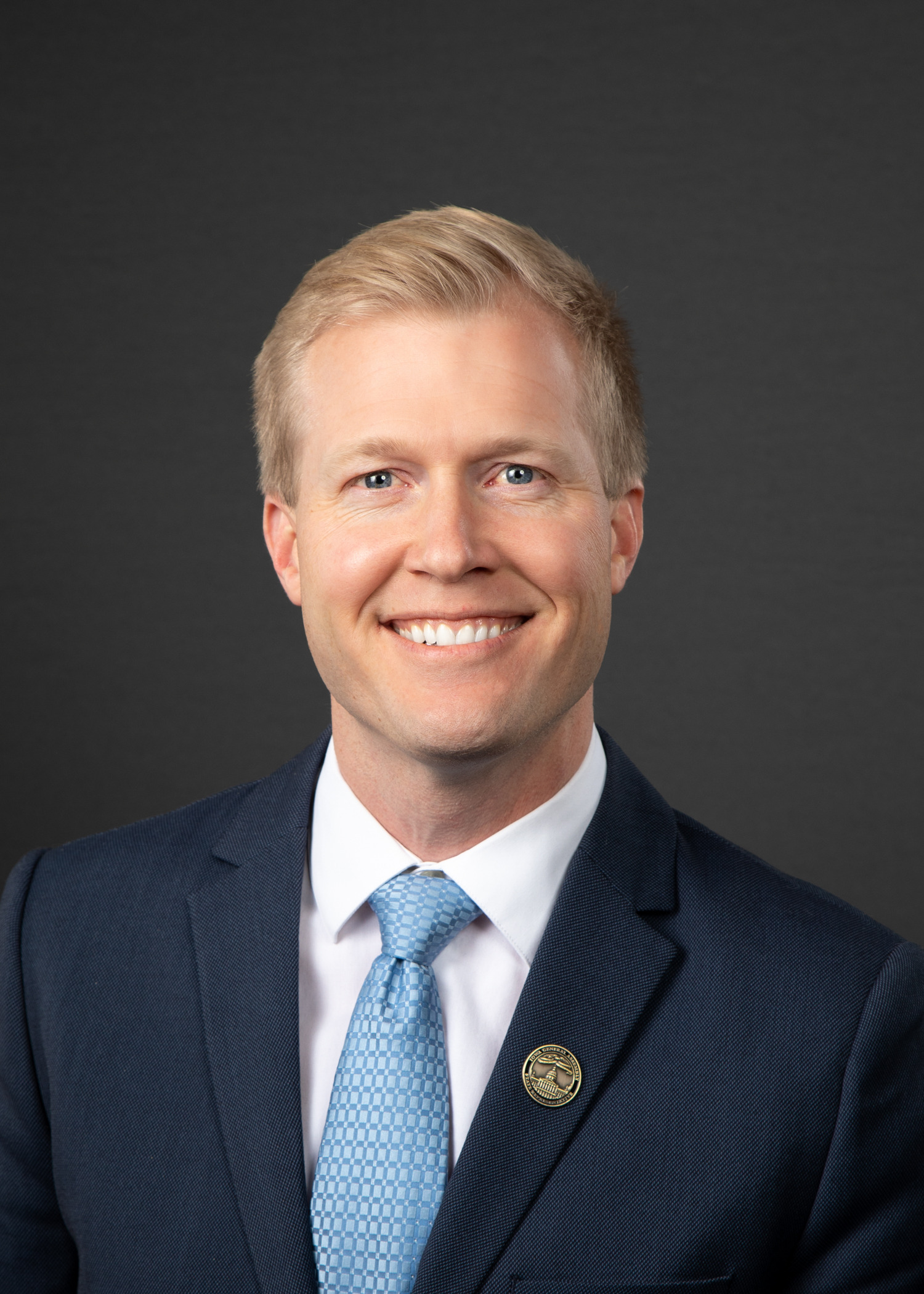

Member of the Iowa House of Representatives from the 36th district
- Incumbent
- Assumed office January 9, 2023
- Preceded by: Marti Anderson (redistricting)

Personal details
- Born: 1984 (age 41–42) Des Moines, Iowa, U.S.
- Party: Democratic
- Spouse: Stephanie
- Children: 2
- Education: University of Iowa (BS, MD)

Austin Baeth (born 1984) is an American politician and physician who has represented the 36th district in the Iowa House of Representatives since January 2023, which consists of parts of west-central Des Moines in Polk County. He is a member of the Democratic Party.

== Early life and education ==
Baeth was born in 1984 in Des Moines, Iowa. He graduated from Herbert Hoover High School. He received a Bachelor of Science and Doctor of Medicine from the University of Iowa in 2007 and 2012, respectively, and completed his residency at the University of Colorado School of Medicine in 2015.

== Political career ==
Baeth announced his candidacy for the open 36th district seat in the Iowa House of Representatives following decennial redistricting in 2021. He won the Democratic primary on June 7, 2022, with over 49 percent of the vote, and ran unopposed in the general election on November 8, winning with over 97 percent of the vote.

Baeth is a member of the Health and Human Services, State Government, and Environmental Protection committees, the lattermost of which he is the ranking member.

In 2024, Baeth filed to run for reelection. He won the Democratic primaries unopposed on June 4, 2024, and ran in the general election unopposed on November 5, 2024.

== Personal life ==
Dr. Baeth specializes in internal medicine and also owns a pizza restaurant in Des Moines. He has a wife, Stephanie, whom he met during his residency in Denver, and with whom he has two children. He resides with his family in the Sherman Hill neighborhood of Des Moines.

== Electoral history ==
Election	Political result	Candidate	Party	Votes	%
Iowa House of Representatives Democratic primary elections, 2022; District 36; Turnout: 5,116	Democratic (newly redistricted)	Austin Baeth	Democratic	2,527	49.4
Iowa House of Representatives Democratic primary elections, 2022; District 36; Turnout: 5,116	Democratic (newly redistricted)	Jaylen Cavil	Democratic	1,078	21.1
Iowa House of Representatives Democratic primary elections, 2022; District 36; Turnout: 5,116	Democratic (newly redistricted)	Shannon Henson	Democratic	885	17.2
Iowa House of Representatives Democratic primary elections, 2022; District 36; Turnout: 5,116	Democratic (newly redistricted)	Gabriel De LaCerda	Democratic	304	5.9
Iowa House of Representatives Democratic primary elections, 2022; District 36; Turnout: 5,116	Democratic (newly redistricted)	Jack Porter	Democratic	214	4.2
Iowa House of Representatives Democratic primary elections, 2022; District 36; Turnout: 5,116	Democratic (newly redistricted)	Chris Disbro	Democratic	108	2.1
Iowa House of Representatives general elections, 2022; District 36; Turnout: 11,180	Democratic (newly redistricted)	Austin Baeth	Democratic	10,911	97.6
Iowa House of Representatives general elections, 2022; District 36; Turnout: 11,180	Democratic (newly redistricted)	Other/Write-in votes		269	2.4
