= Mark Kuhn =

American politician

Mark A. Kuhn
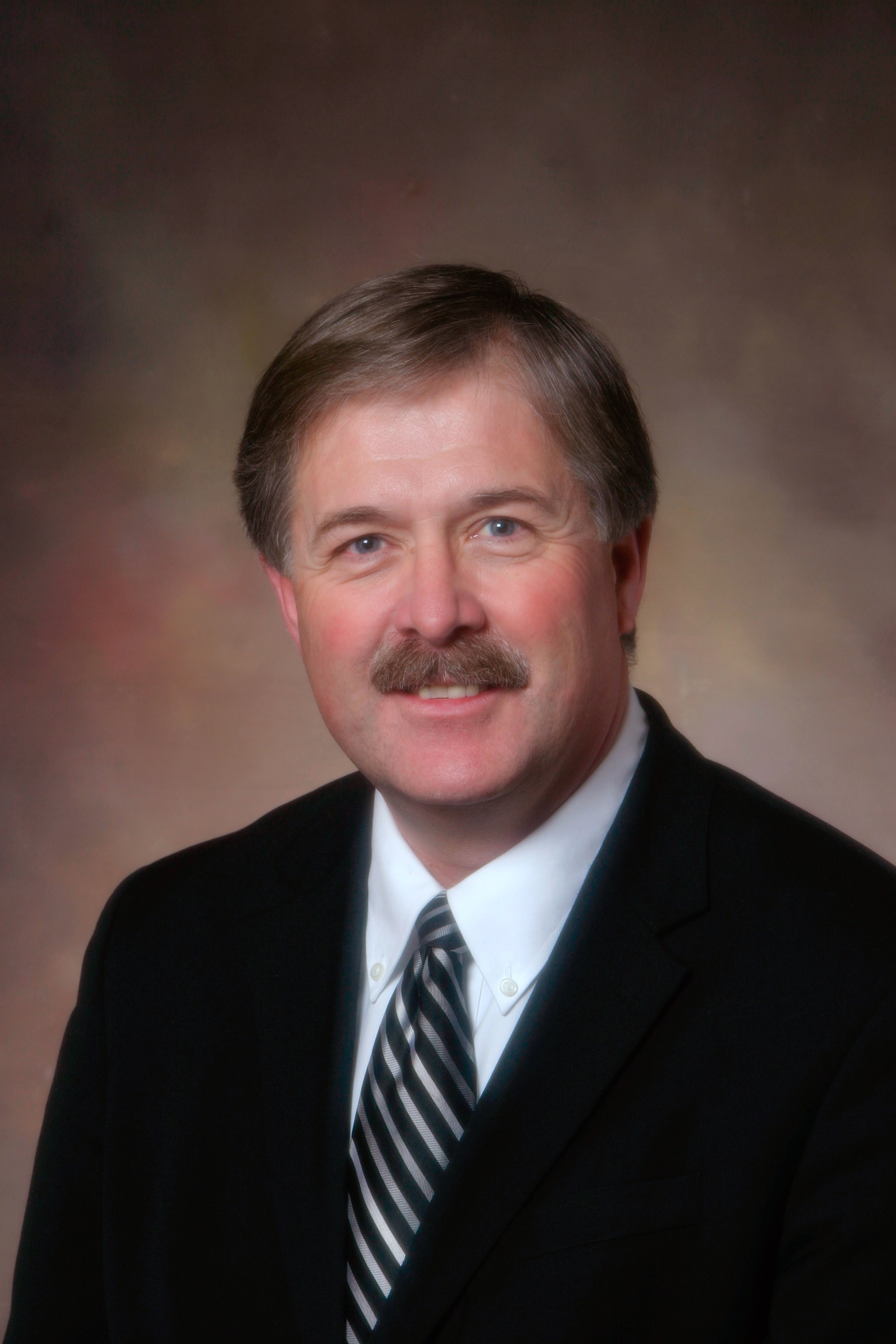

Member of the Iowa House of Representatives from the 14th district 29th district (1999–2003)
- In office January 1999 – January 2011
- Preceded by: George Eichhorn
- Succeeded by: Joshua Byrnes

Personal details
- Born: September 10, 1950 (age 75) Charles City, Iowa, U.S.
- Party: Democratic
- Spouse: Denise
- Website: legis.iowa.gov/...

Mark A. Kuhn (born September 10, 1950 in Charles City, Iowa) is an American grain farmer and politician. He was the Iowa State Representative for the 14th District and served in the Iowa House of Representatives from 1999 through 2011.

== Early life and education ==
Kuhn is the son of Max Kuhn, a farmer, and Helen, a school teacher. Kuhn grew up on his family's farm and graduated from Charles City High School in 1968. He received his BS in history and his teaching certificate from Iowa State University. After graduating college, Kuhn moved back home to work on the family farm.

== Career ==
Kuhn has worked on the Kuhn family grain farm for 34 years. He also worked as a substitute teacher for fifteen years.

In 1999 he was elected the Iowa State Representative for the 14th District. He was re-elected in 2006 with 8,154 votes (75%), defeating Independent opponent Darwin J. Rieman.

In the Iowa House of Representatives Kuhn served on the Agriculture committee; the Environmental Protection committee; Rebuild Iowa/Disaster Recovery Committee; the Public Safety committee; and the Appropriations committee, where he was the vice chair. He also chaired the Agriculture and Natural Resources Appropriations Subcommittee.

In 2010 Kuhn decided to retire from the Iowa House and not run in the 2010 election but run for an open seat on the Floyd County Board of Supervisors instead. As of July 2017 he is on the Floyd County Board of Supervisors and advocates for more restrictive manure management practices, a reform of the "Master Matrix", in order to improve Iowa´s water quality.

== Personal life ==
Kuhn is married to his wife Denise and together they have two sons: Mason and Alex. They live just outside Charles City, Iowa, on his farm, where he maintains a one-court tennis facility dubbed the All Iowa Lawn Tennis Club, which was featured in an issue of TENNIS Magazine. He owns the first wind turbine commissioned during President Obama’s administration.

== Organizations ==
Kuhn is or has been a member of the following organizations:

- Trinity United Methodist Church
- Foster Grandparents Advisory Committee
- Free Our Communities of Unhealthy Substances Council
- Mental Health Center of North Iowa
- Second Judicial District Department of Correctional Services
- Floyd County Agricultural Development Authority
- Charles City Area Development Corporation.
- Northern Prairie Regional Economic Development Corporation
- Iowa’s Center for Agricultural Safety and Health Advisory Committee
- Floyd County Water Quality Coordinating Committee

Iowa House of Representatives
Preceded by Deo Koengis	29th District; 1999–2003	Succeeded by Ro Foege
Preceded by George Eichhorn	14th District; 2003–2011	Succeeded by Joshua Byrnes
