= Geri Huser =

American politician (born 1963)

Geri D. Huser
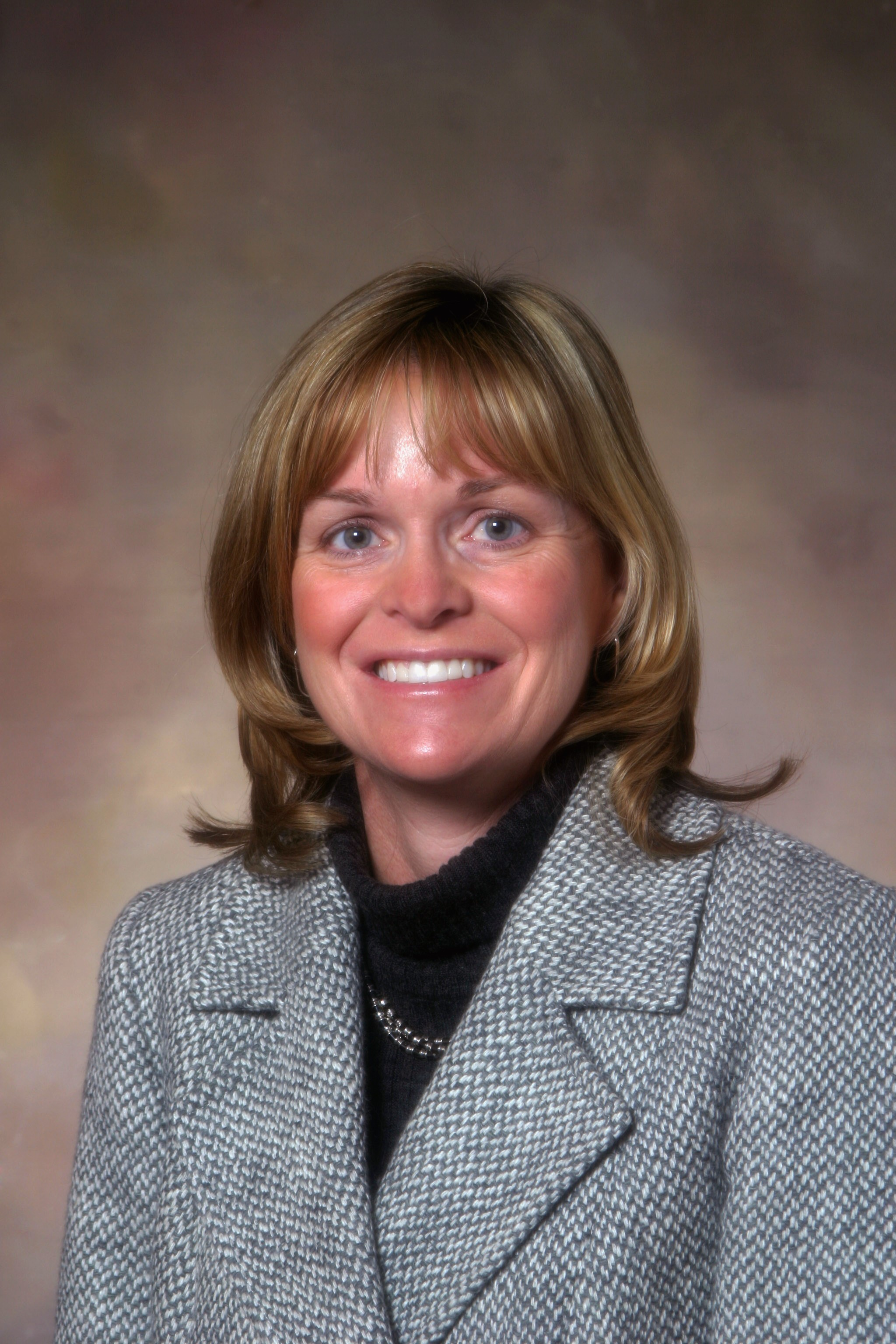

Member of the Iowa House of Representatives from the 42nd district
- In office 1996–2011
- Preceded by: James Van Fossen
- Succeeded by: Kim Pearson

Personal details
- Born: July 14, 1963 (age 63) Des Moines, Iowa
- Party: Democratic
- Spouse: Dan Huser
- Children: 2
- Occupation: Chairwoman of the Iowa Utilities Board.
- Profession: attorney
- Website: Huser's website

Geri D. Huser (born July 14, 1963) is an American lawyer and Democratic party politician. She served in the Iowa House of Representatives from 1996 to 2011. 2015-2023 served as Chairwoman of the Iowa Utilities Board. Resigned from Iowa Utilities Board in 2023.

== Early life and education ==
Geri Huser, née Skinner, was born to Ed and Lois Skinner. Her father is an attorney and land developer. She has a sister, Julie Skinner-Stewart. She graduated from Southeast Polk High School and later received a B.A. in social work from Briar Cliff College. She also got a J.D. degree from Drake University.

== Career ==
From 1990 to 1994, she served as a member of the Altoona City Council. She also served on the Metropolitan Planning Organization beginning in 1990.

From 1996 to 2011, Huser represented the 42nd District in the Iowa House of Representatives and served on several committees: the Judiciary committee; the Local Government committee; the Ways and Means committee; and the Transportation committee, which she chaired. In 2006, Huser was re-elected with 8,493 votes, running unopposed. She lost re-election in 2011 to tea party Republican Kim Pearson by 126 votes. As of 2011, she served as a Planning Specialist with Polk County Social Services and has been director of Iowa Finance Authority's Title Guaranty Division. After serving in the House, Huser became a partner at Skinner Law Firm in Altoona.

In 2015, she became Chairwoman of the Iowa Utilities Board. In June 2016 she voted not to allow the controversial construction of the Bakken pipeline to continue, but lost due to votes by the other two members, Nick Wagner and Libby Jacobs, who voted in favor.

In 2017, it became known that she had continued to work in her legal practice on the side, in 500 court filings.

Huser was named to Governor Terry Branstad's Transportation 2020 Citizen Advisory Commission. Her IUB board leadership ended in 2023, however her board term was scheduled to continue for four years; it is unclear, why Kim Reynolds replaced her. As she was appointed by former governor Terry Branstad, who has been working for the Summit Agricultural Group, which is seeking a permit for carbon capture pipeline to North Dakota she had a perceived conflict of interest, but she "at least had an open mind about this case", as critics have noted.

== Personal life ==
Huser is married to Dan Huser, and together they have a daughter, Kelli, and a son, Blake.

== Organizations ==
- Altoona City Council (2 years)
- Greater Des Moines Housing Trust Fund Board
- Metropolitan Planning Organization
- Altoona Family Home
- East Polk Interagency Association

Iowa House of Representatives
Preceded by Larry Disney	66th District; 1996–2002	Succeeded by Ed Fallon
Preceded by James Van Fossen	42nd District; 2002–2011	Succeeded by Kim Pearson
