= Iowa Utilities Board =

Agency in the US state of Iowa

The Iowa Utilities Board (IUB) is a three-member public utilities commission, with beginnings in 1878. It is a quasi-judicial tribunal, which regulates services and rates of electric, natural gas, water and telecommunication providers, as well as all pipelines and transmission lines in the U.S. state of Iowa and has existed with its present name since 1986.

== History ==
=== 1878–1986 ===
In 1878 the Iowa Board of Railroad Commissioners was founded, whose three members were publicly elected for a two-year term. In 1911, an Office of Commerce Counsel was established within, which with increasing electrification took on the regulation of transmission lines. In 1937, it was renamed the Iowa State Commerce Commission.

It was only in 1963 that the regulation of rates and services of all public utility companies (electricity, natural gas, water and telecommunications) became Iowa State Commerce Commission tasks. At the same time, the legislature extended commissioner terms to six years and the positions became appointed. In 1986, the state renamed the commission as "Iowa Utilities Board".

=== 21 st century ===
In August 2023, the IUB held hearings regarding Summit Carbon Solutions proposal to build 700 miles of carbon capture pipeline in Iowa for carbon generated by ethanol plants to underground storage in North Dakota., one of three companies planning such a project. In June 2024, the IUB approved the controversial Summit pipeline including eminent domain to force non cooperative landowners.

== Authority ==
The Iowa Utilities Board regulates rates and services of electric utilities, natural gas utility and water utilities, and some telecommunication companies per Iowa Code chapters 476 through 479B. It supervises all pipelines and transmission lines, and the sale and distribution of electricity. In addition it has various connected authorities like resolving disputes and dealing with complaints, enforcing safety as far as engineering standards go.

=== Electric utilities ===
The IUB regulates service and rates of the 2 Iowa electric companies, MidAmerican Energy and Interstate Power and Light Company (IPL), a subsidiary of Alliant Energy Company and also the Rural Electric Cooperatives (RECs). The latter can choose to be regulated for rates and only the Linn County, Iowa REC has chosen to do so.

=== Waterworks ===
The IUB regulates rates and service of only the Iowa-American Water Company, which operates in Davenport, Iowa and Clinton, Iowa. It neither regulates small, nor municipally owned water utilities.

=== Communications utilities ===
The IUB regulates only the service of landline telephone providers in Iowa, and neither regulates cellphone providers, nor any rates. Since 2007 it issue cable television franchise agreements.

=== Pipelines ===
The IUB decides about the building and maintenance of all pipelines, whether they carry gas, oil or carbon (Hazardous Liquid Pipeline Permit).

== Members ==
Members are appointed by the Governor of Iowa for 6-year terms. As of 2016 the IUB consisted of Libby Jacobs, Nick Wagner with Geri Huser as chairwoman. As of 2023 the IUB consisted of Richard W. Lozier, Jr. and Joshua Byrnes with Geri Huser as chairwoman.

As of 2015, Huser has been described as "businessfriendly". In 2017, there was a petition to remove Lozier because of connections to Energy Transfer Partners during the time when the Dakota Access pipeline was being deliberated.

Board members since the board's inception in 1986 are listed in the table per its website.

Term	Name	Function	Party
1987–1997	Nancy Shimanek Boyd		
1988–1994	Dennis Nagel		
1991–1999	Emmit George		
1995–2001	Allan T. Thoms		
1997–1999	Paula Dierenfeld		
1999–2001	Susan Frye		
1999–2007	Diane Munns		
2001–2005	Mark O. Lambert		
2002–2005	Elliott G. Smith		
2005–2009	John R. Norris		
2005–2007	Curtis W. Stamp		
2007–2011	Krista K. Tanner		
2007–2013	Darrell Hanson		Republican
2009–2011	Robert Berntsen		
2011–2013	Swati Dandekar		Democratic
2013–2015	Sheila Tipton		
2011–2017	Libby Jacobs	interim chair May 1, 2011 - April 30, 2015	Republican
2013–2020	Nick Wagner		Republican
2015–2023	Geri Huser	chair	Democratic
2017-2023	Richard W. Lozier, Jr.		
2020-2025	Joshua Byrnes		Republican
2023-2029	Erik Helland	chair	Republican
2023-2027	Sarah M. Martz		

== Court cases ==
- Verizon Communications Inc. v. Federal Communications Commission (2002)
- Sprint Communications, Inc. v. Jacobs, began in 2011
- Mt. Pleasant Municipal Utilities v. Iowa Utilities Board, 2014
- Hawkeye land company v. Iowa Utilities Board, 2014
- Great Lakes Communication Corporation v. IUB, began in 2015
