= Dakota Access Pipeline =

Oil pipeline project in the United States

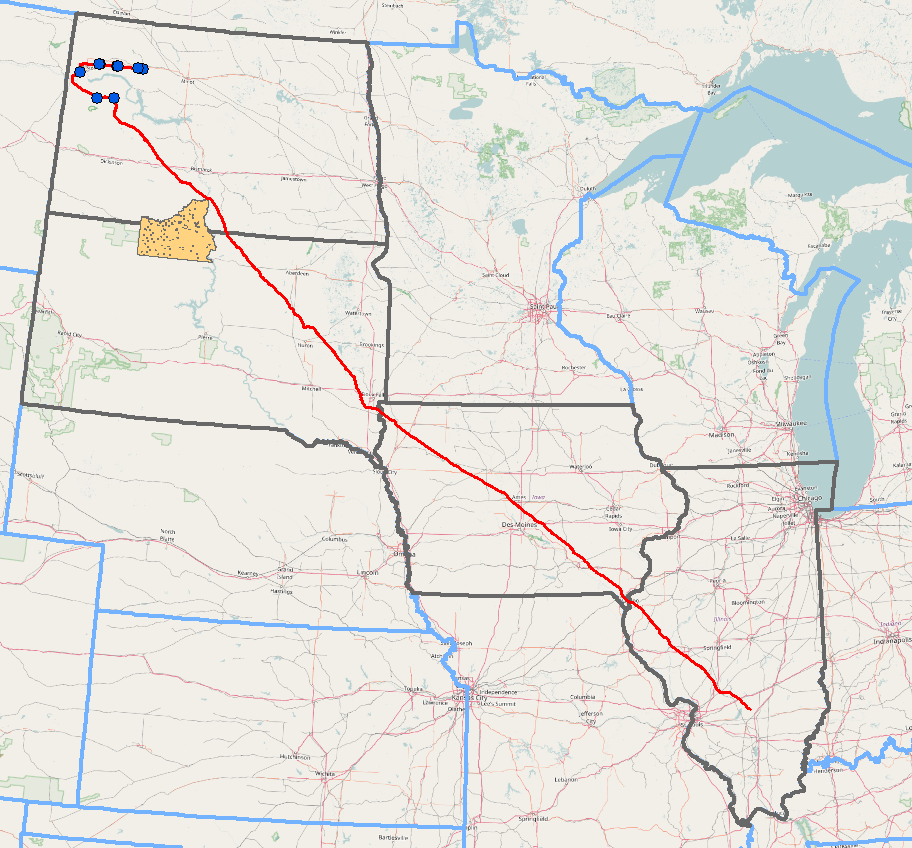
- Dakota Access Pipeline route (Standing Rock Sioux Reservation is shown in orange, affected states are outlined in black)

Location
- Country: United States
- Direction: southeastward
- Start: Stanley, North Dakota
- Passes through: States of North Dakota (Bismarck); South Dakota (Redfield, Sioux Falls); Iowa (Sioux Center, Storm Lake, Ames, Oskaloosa, Ottumwa, Fort Madison); Illinois (Jacksonville)
- To: Patoka, Illinois (oil tank farm)

General information
- Type: Crude oil
- Partners: Energy Transfer Partners; Phillips 66; Enbridge; Marathon Petroleum
- Operator: Dakota Access Pipeline, LLC (development phase); Energy Transfer Partners (operational phase)
- Construction started: 2016
- Commissioned: June 1, 2017; 9 years ago

Technical information
- Length: 1,172 mi (1,886 km)
- Maximum discharge: 0.47 million barrels per day (~2.3×10^{7} t/a)
- Diameter: 30 in (762 mm)
- Website: daplpipelinefacts.com

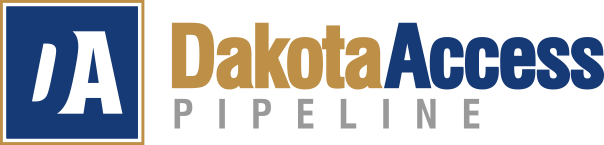
Pipeline logo

The Dakota Access Pipeline (DAPL) or Bakken pipeline is a 1,172-mile-long (1,886 km) underground pipeline in the United States that has the ability to transport up to 750,000 barrels of light sweet crude oil per day. It begins in the shale oil fields of the Bakken Formation in northwest North Dakota and continues through South Dakota and Iowa to an oil terminal near Patoka, Illinois. Together with the Energy Transfer Crude Oil Pipeline from Patoka to Nederland, Texas, it forms the Bakken system. The pipeline transports 40 percent of the oil produced in the Bakken region.

The $3.78 billion project was announced to the public in June 2014 with construction beginning in June 2016. During the Obama presidency the State Department estimated the project would create up to 3,900 temporary construction jobs and 35 permanent full-time jobs. During the Trump presidency the State Department estimated the project would create 42,000 direct and indirect jobs. The pipeline was completed in April 2017 and became operational in May 2017. The pipeline is owned by Dakota Access, LLC, controlled by Energy Transfer Partners, with minority interests from Phillips 66, and affiliates of Enbridge and Marathon Petroleum.

Protests against the pipeline occurred from 2016 to 2017, organized by those opposing its construction, including the Standing Rock Sioux Reservation.

== History ==
=== Planning, 2014–2016 ===
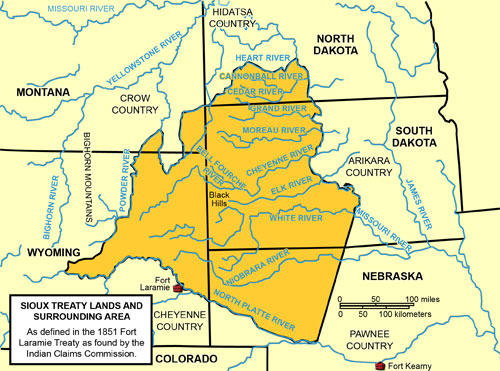
Treaty of Fort Laramie (1851) boundary which Dave Archambault II invoked, opposing any pipeline construction within that area.

Prior to the Dakota Access Pipeline, light sweet crude oil from the Bakken Formation was transported mainly by rail during the North Dakota oil boom. Extraction from the area increased from 309,000 barrels a day in 2010 to more than 1 million in 2014, with insufficient pipeline infrastructure to transport the increased extraction. Plans for the pipeline were announced by Energy Transfer Partners in 2014, with Phillips 66 acquired 25% stake in the project later that same year. Energy Transfer Partners estimated that the pipeline would create between 12 and 15 permanent jobs and from 2,000 to 4,000 temporary jobs in Iowa. The $1.35 billion capital investment in Iowa was projected to generate $33 million sales tax in Iowa during construction and $30 million property tax in 2017. Energy Transfer hired "Strategic Economics Group" in West Des Moines to prepare this analysis.

Dakota Access and the USACE held 559 meetings with potentially affected parties, including 389 meetings with 55 potentially affected American Indian tribes. In September 2014, Dakota Access held an initial informational meeting with the Standing Rock Sioux Tribal Council. Informational meetings for South Dakota and Illinois landowners were held in October 2014, and starting on December 1, 2014, in each of the affected counties in Iowa. Meetings in Fort Madison, Sioux Center, Oskaloosa and Storm Lake brought out hundreds of people expressing their support and/or opposition to the pipeline. A webinar for Brown and Hancock County, Illinois took place in February 2015. The Standing Rock Sioux Tribe generally refused to participate in consultations with Dakota Access or with USACE.

On October 29, 2014, Dakota Access submitted the project to the Iowa Utilities Board (IUB), after Iowa Governor Terry Branstad rejected requests from community and environmental activists who asked him to block plans. In December 2014 Dakota Access submitted an application for a permit from the North Dakota Public Service Commission for the proposed route. In January 2015, Dakota Access filed the application with the IUB. In February 2015, it filed applications with the Iowa Department of Natural Resources for sovereign land and floodplain permits. In April 2015, Iowa Senate Study Bill 1276 and House Study Bill 249 advanced with both Senator Robert Hogg, D-Cedar Rapids, and State Representative Bobby Kaufmann, R-Wilton, in support; it required Dakota Access "to obtain voluntary easements from 75% of property owners along the route before eminent domain could be authorized".

The Iowa Utilities Board approved the pipeline on March 10, 2016, on a vote of 3 to 0, being the last of four states utility regulators granting its approval. The approval came after 18 public information meetings, pre-filled testimony, thousands of public comments, and 12 days of public hearings. Conditions of the approval included liability insurance of at least $25 million; guarantees that the parent companies of Dakota Access will pay for damages created by a pipeline leak or spill; a revised agricultural impact mitigation plan; a timeline for construction notices; modified condemnation easement forms; and a statement accepting the terms and condition's of the board's order." The IUB stated that with the conditions, the pipeline would promote public convenience and necessity. The following day, the company stated it had secured voluntary easements on 82% of the 1,295 affected Iowa land parcels. A week later, Dakota Access filed motions with the IUB requesting expedited and confidential treatment to begin construction immediately, saying it met the conditions and that its liability insurance policies were trade secrets under Iowa law and "would serve no public purpose". Dakota Access also filed 23 condemnation suits against 140 individuals, banks, and a coal mine to gain easements through North Dakota.

A 2015 poll showed that fifty seven percent of Iowans favored the construction of the pipeline.

=== Construction, 2016–2017 ===
Presidential Memorandum Regarding Construction of the Dakota Access Pipeline (2017)

Energy Transfer began construction on the pipeline before receiving all necessary permits. The pipeline was not constructed end-to-end but in 11 discrete segments which were later connected to form a complete pipeline.

In March 2016, the United States Fish and Wildlife Service issued a sovereign lands construction permit. In late May 2016, the permit was temporarily revoked in three counties of Iowa, where the pipeline would cross the Big Sioux River and the Big Sioux Wildlife Management Area; these are historic and cultural sites of the Upper Sioux tribe, including graves in Lyon County. Also in May 2016, Iowa farmers filed lawsuits to prevent the state from using eminent domain.

In June 2016, the IUB voted 2 to 1 (Libby Jacobs and Nick Wagner in favor and Chairwoman Geri Huser against) to allow construction on non-sovereign lands to continue. The Sierra Club said this action was illegal before the U.S. Corps of Engineers authorized the project. In late June 2016, construction was allowed to resume in Lyon County after plans were changed to route the pipeline 85 feet (26 m) below the site using directional boring, instead of trenching and disturbing the soil on the surface. In December 2016, the approval was disputed in the Polk County District Court. In July and August 2016, The United States Army Corps of Engineers (USACE) approved the water crossing permits and issued all but one permission necessary for the pipeline construction.

On July 27, 2016, the Standing Rock Sioux Tribe sued the USACE in the United States District Court for the District of Columbia. The motion for preliminary injunction was denied in the U.S. District Court in September 2016. In September 2016, the Standing Rock Sioux Tribe filed an appeal which was denied a month later.

In August 2016, the joint venture of Enbridge (75%) and Marathon Petroleum (25%) agreed to purchase a 49% stake in Dakota Access, LLC for $2 billion. The deal was completed in February 2017 after the final easement was granted.

In September 2016 the U.S Department of Justice received more than 33,000 petitions to review all permits and order a full review of the project's environmental effects. On September 9, 2016, the U.S. Departments of Justice, Army, and Interior issued a joint statement to temporarily halt the project on federal land bordering or under the Lake Oahe reservoir. The U.S. federal government asked the company for a "voluntary pause" on construction near the area until further study was done in the region extending 20 miles (32 km) around Lake Oahe. Energy Transfer Partners rejected the request and resumed construction. On September 13, 2016, chairman and CEO of Energy Transfer Partners Kelcy Warren said concerns about the pipeline's impact on the water supply were "unfounded", that "multiple archaeological studies conducted with state historic preservation offices found no sacred items along the route" and that the company would meet with officials in Washington "to understand their position and reiterate our commitment to bring the Dakota Access Pipeline into operation." By September 15, construction was 48% complete.

On November 1, 2016, President Obama announced his administration was monitoring the situation and had been in contact with the USACE to examine the possibility of rerouting the pipeline to avoid sacred lands. On November 14, 2016, the USACE announced that "the Army has determined that additional discussion and analysis are warranted in light of the history of the Great Sioux Nation's dispossessions of lands, the importance of Lake Oahe to the Tribe, our government-to-government relationship, and the statute governing easements through government property." Energy Transfer Partners responded by criticizing the Obama administration for "political interference" and said that "further delay in the consideration of this case would add millions of dollars more each month in costs which cannot be recovered." North Dakota Governor Jack Dalrymple criticized the decision saying the pipeline would be safe and that the decision was "long overdue". Craig Stevens, spokesman for the Midwest Alliance for Infrastructure Now (MAIN) Coalition, called the Corps's announcement "yet another attempt at death by delay" and said the Obama administration "has chosen to further fan the flames of protest by more inaction." North Dakota Senator John Hoeven said in a statement that the delay "will only prolong the disruption in the region caused by protests and make life difficult for everyone who lives and works in the area." Speaking to CBS News in November, Kelcy Warren said that it would be "100 percent that the easement gets granted and the pipeline gets built" when newly elected president elect Donald Trump came into office on January 20, 2017.

On December 4, 2016, the USACE announced, it would not grant an easement for the pipeline to be drilled under Lake Oahe and was undertaking an environmental impact statement to look at possible alternative routes. The Assistant Secretary of the Army (Civil Works), Jo-Ellen Darcy said that "the best way to complete that work responsibly and expeditiously is to explore alternate routes for the pipeline crossing". Energy Transfer Partners and Sunoco Logistics Partners issued a same-day response saying that the White House's directive "is just the latest in a series of overt and transparent political actions by an administration which has abandoned the rule of law in favor of currying favor with a narrow and extreme political constituency." They said that the companies "fully expect to complete construction of the pipeline without any additional rerouting in and around Lake Oahe. Nothing this Administration has done today changes that in any way."

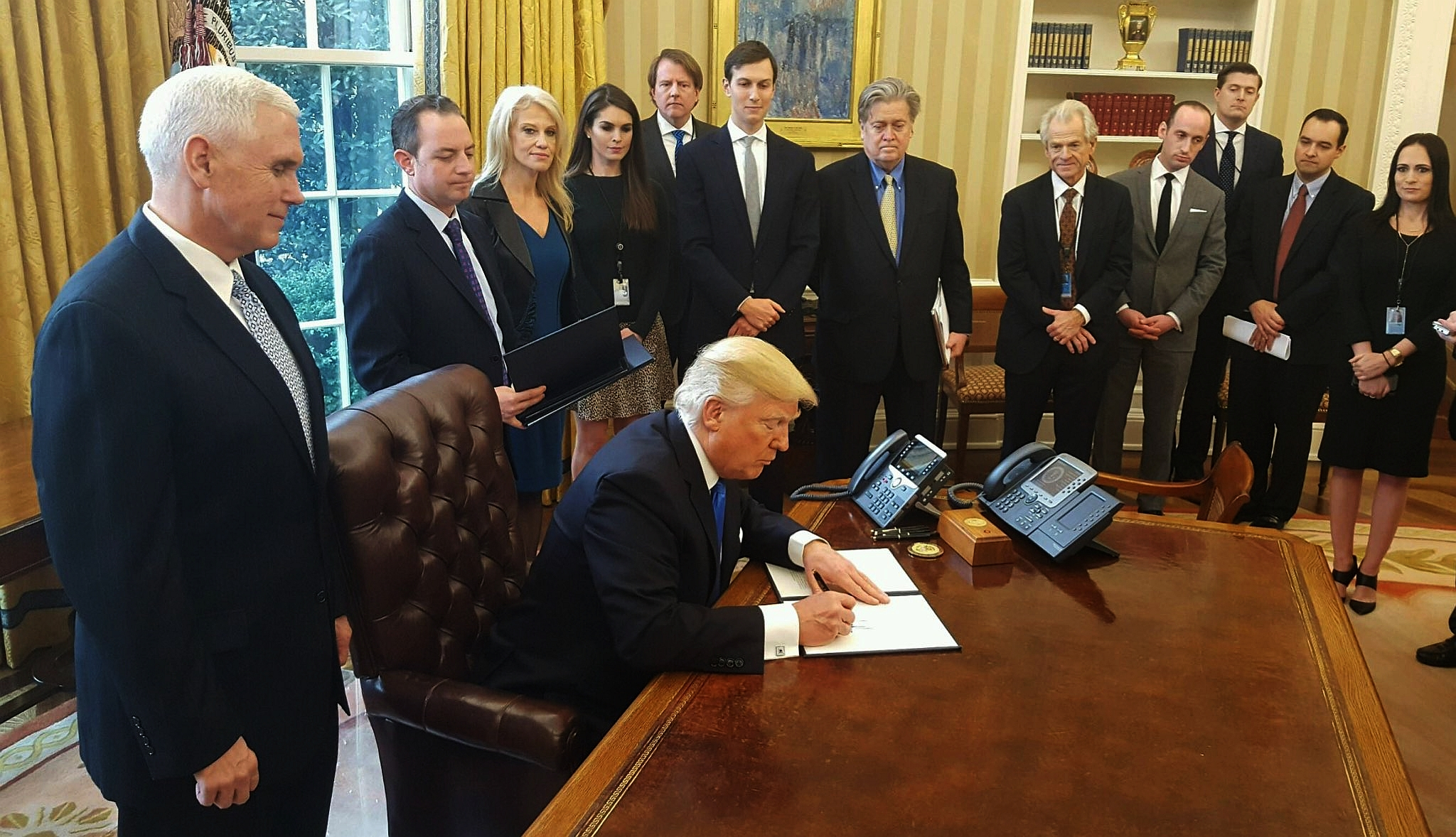
President Donald Trump signing the Presidential Memoranda to advance the construction of the Keystone XL and Dakota Access pipelines. January 24th, 2017

On January 18, 2017, the USACE filed its formal Notice of Intent to conduct the Environmental Impact Statement process. The notice opened a thirty-day comment on the scope of the EIS, addressing the crossing of Lake Oahe. The proposed EIS was to consider "Alternative locations for the pipeline crossing the Missouri River", direct and indirect risks and impacts, as well as their treaty rights to the lake. The same day U.S. District Judge James Boasberg denied ETP's request to delay the EIS process.

Following the inauguration of Donald Trump in January 2017, he signed a presidential memorandum to advance approval of pipeline construction, while stating his intention to "renegotiate some of the terms" of the pipeline bill. The order would expedite the environmental review that Trump described as an "incredibly cumbersome, long, horrible permitting process". These executive orders, which also included the Keystone XL Pipeline, outlined how the completion of the pipeline would create more jobs.

On February 7, 2017, the USACE sent a notice of intent to the United States Congress to grant an easement under Lake Oahe 24 hours following notification of the delivery of the notification. On February 9, 2017, the Cheyenne River Sioux sued the easement decision, citing an 1851 treaty and interference with the religious practices of the tribe.

The Dakota Access Pipeline had temporary workforce housing for the pipeline workers. Construction of the pipeline was completed in April 2017.

=== Operation, 2017 to present ===
The first oil was delivered through the pipeline on May 14, 2017. On June 1, 2017, testing was completed and the pipeline became commercially operational.

After the pipeline's first year of operation, Forbes reported that it was transporting over 500,000 barrels per day (79,000 m^{3}/d) and had transported approximately 182.5 Mbbl (29.02 million m^{3}) of oil. By 2021, the pipeline had the ability to transport 750,000 barrels of oil per day and was accounting for 40 percent of oil produced in the Bakken region.

United States District Judge James Boasberg ruled in March 2020 that the government had not studied the pipeline's "effects on the quality of the human environment" enough, ordering the United States Army Corps of Engineers to conduct a new environmental impact review. In July 2020, Judge Boasberg ordered the pipeline to be shut down and emptied of oil pending a new environmental review. The temporary shutdown order was overturned by a U.S. appeals court on August 5, 2020, who permitted the pipeline to carry oil while the federal government completed a more thorough environmental analysis. In 2021, the U.S. Court of Appeals for the D.C. Circuit sided with the Standing Rock Sioux and other tribes that there should have been a thorough environmental review (there was only a 2015 preliminary review) for the 2-mile pipeline section below Lake Oahe. In February 2022, the U.S. Supreme Court let this decision stand by declining to hear the case. Despite these rulings, the pipeline still remains fully operational to this day. The U.S. Army Corps of Engineers completed the more comprehensive environmental assessment in May 2026 and issued a new final permit that allows pipeline operations to continue, removing a major source of regulatory uncertainty.

== Technical description ==
The pipeline cost $3.78 billion, of which $1.4 billion was invested in the North Dakota portion, $820 million was invested in the South Dakota portion, $1.04 billion was invested in the Iowa portion, and $516 million was invested in the Illinois portion.

The pipeline has a permanent easement of 50 feet (15 m) and a construction right-of-way of up to 150 feet (46 m). The 30-inch-diameter (760 mm) pipeline is at least 48 inches (1.2 m) underground from the top of the pipe or 2 feet (0.61 m) below any drain tiles. At the length of 1,172 miles (1,886 km) and diameter of 30 inches (760 mm), the entire pipeline volume is 30,214,400 cubic feet (855,576 m^{3}). At the stated daily transport volume of 2.6 million cubic feet (75,000 m^{3}), the discharge time to empty the whole pipeline is estimated at 11.4 days.

Capacity expansion construction was undertaken by Energy Transfer Partners in 2021, which increased the line's capacity from 570,000 bpd to its current nameplate of 750,000.

== Comparison to rail transport ==
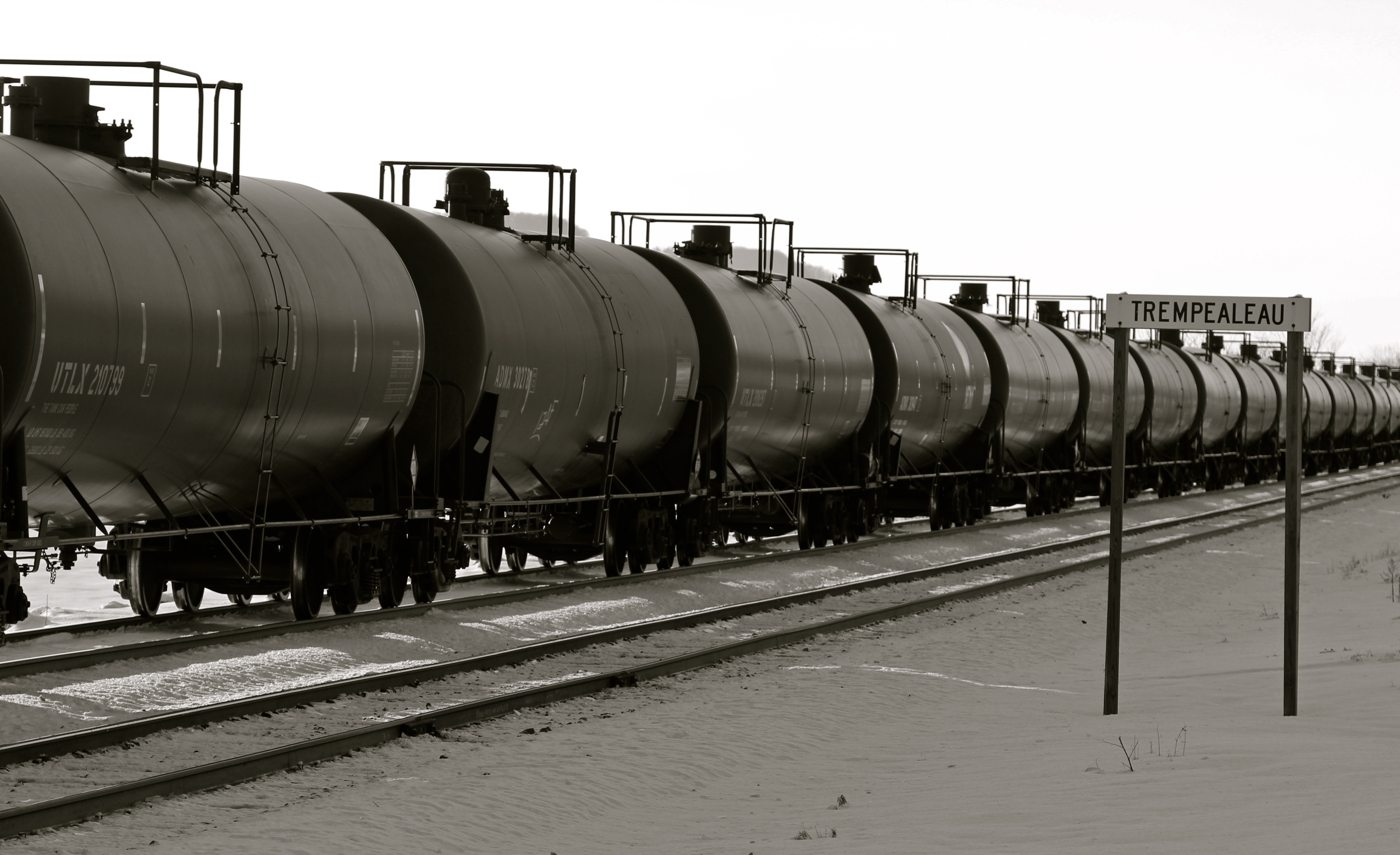
Bakken Oil being shipped by rail in Trempealeau, Wisconsin, a few feet from the Mississippi River.

The developer argued that the pipeline improves the overall safety to the public, would help the U.S. to attain energy independence, and is a more reliable and safer method of transport to refineries than rail or road. Proponents have argued that the pipeline will free up railroads, which will allow farmers to ship more Midwest grain. As of July 2014, Bakken shale oil was transported through nine Iowa counties exclusively via three freight trains per week. As of June 2014, 32 trains per week carrying Bakken oil traveled through Jo Daviess County in northwestern Illinois.

== Ownership ==
The pipeline is owned by Energy Transfer (36.4% stake), MarEn Bakken Company LLC, and Phillips 66 Partners. MarEn Bakken Company LLC is an entity owned by MPLX LP (an affiliate of Marathon Petroleum) and Enbridge Energy Partners L.P.

Bakken Holdings Company and Phillips 66 also co-own another part of the Bakken system, the Energy Transfer Crude Oil Pipeline which runs from Patoka to storage terminals in Nederland, Texas.

== Financing ==
The pipeline project cost $3.78 billion, of which $2.5 billion was financed by loans, while the rest of the capital was raised by the sale of ownership in Dakota Access, LLC to Enbridge and Marathon Petroleum. The loans were provided by a group of 17 banks, including Citibank, Wells Fargo, BNP Paribas, SunTrust, Royal Bank of Scotland, Bank of Tokyo-Mitsubishi, Mizuho Bank, TD Securities, ABN AMRO Capital, ING Bank, DNB ASA, ICBC, SMBC Nikko Securities and Société Générale.

Due to pressure resulting from the Dakota Access Pipeline protests, some banks decided to pull funding in the project. This included DNB ASA Financial services group. In February 2017, Seattle, Washington's city council unanimously voted not to renew its contract with Wells Fargo "in a move that cites the bank's role as a lender to the Dakota Access Pipeline project as well as its "creation of millions of bogus accounts" and saying the bidding process for its next banking partner will involve "social responsibility." The City Council in Davis, California, took a similar action, voting unanimously to find a new bank to handle its accounts by the end of 2017. In March 2017, ING sold its stake in the loan, while retaining a potential risk in case of non-payment under the loan.

Thirteen of the 17 banks that financed the pipeline were signatories to the Equator Principles. Despite concerns being raised that the project could threaten the water supply from Lake Oahe and the Missouri River if a leak occurred, project financing was still approved.

== Route ==
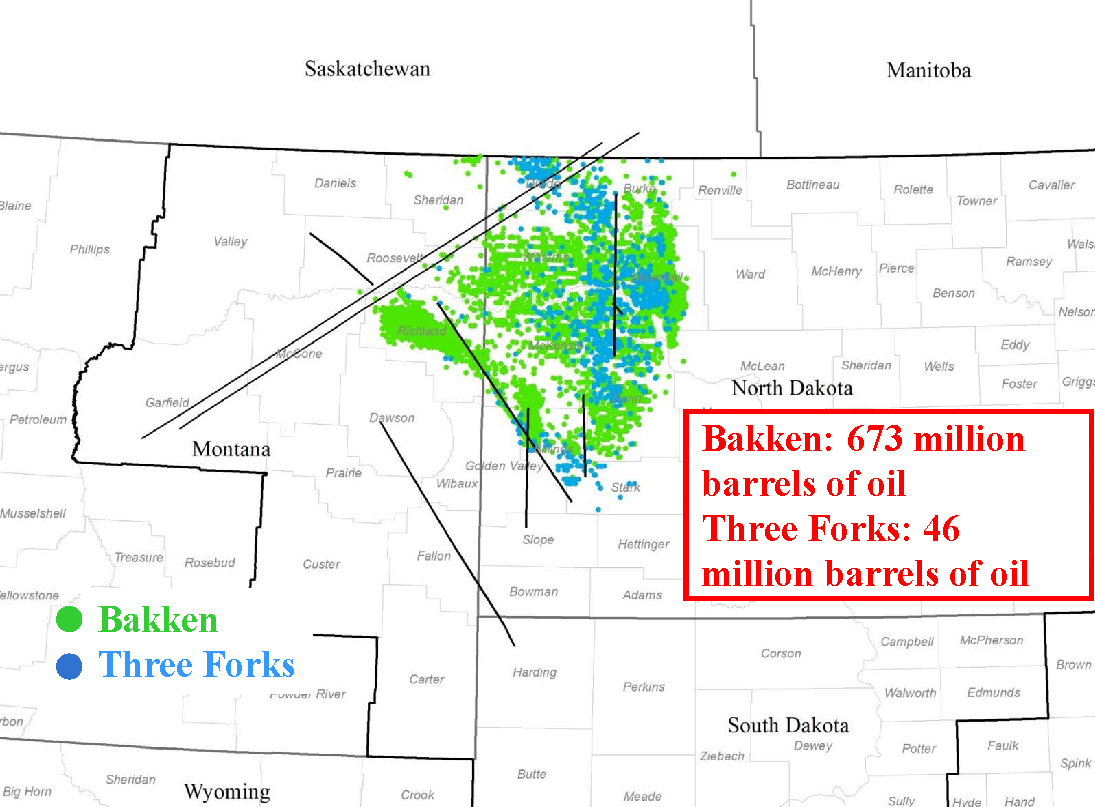
Map of Bakken wells in North Dakota and Montana

The pipeline route runs from the northwestern North Dakota Bakken and Three Forks sites. It starts in Stanley, North Dakota, and travels in a southeastward direction to end at the oil tank farm near Patoka, Illinois. It crosses 50 counties in four states, and is built on private land with portions crossing waters of the United States and flood control areas managed by the United States Army Corps of Engineers.

In North Dakota, the 346-mile (557 km) route traverses seven counties. The project consists of 143 miles (230 km) of oil-gathering pipelines and 200 miles (322 km) of larger transmission pipeline. The route starts with a terminal in the Stanley area and runs west with five more terminals in Ramberg Station, Epping, Trenton, Watford City and Johnsons Corner before becoming a transmission line going through Williston, the Watford City area, south of Bismarck, and crossing the Missouri River again north of Cannon Ball. It also includes six tank farm locations and one electric pump station.

In the early stages of route planning, it was proposed laying the pipeline 10 miles (16 km) northeast of Bismarck, North Dakota. The United States Army Corps of Engineers (USACE) evaluated alternative routes as part of compliance with the National Environmental Policy Act, including one route north of Bismarck, North Dakota. This alternative was determined not to be a viable alternative because of multiple factors, including that it was not co-located with other infrastructure, the route's impacts to wellhead water resources, constraints on the route from the North Dakota Public Service Commission's 500-foot residential buffer requirement and the route's additional impacts to areas identified as High Consequence areas under Pipeline and Hazardous Materials Safety Administration regulations.

The Bismarck route was rejected by the United States Army Corps of Engineers (USACE) before submitting a request to the North Dakota Public Service Commission (NDPSC) for a permit. This decision was described by Jesse Jackson as environmental racism. The change of the route put the pipeline into the existing pipeline corridor parallel to the already existing Northern Border Pipeline, a natural gas pipeline built in 1982. The Dakota Access pipeline selected a "nearly identical route" and planned to cross the Missouri River near the same point. The plans called for the pipeline to be directionally bored so that it would not come in contact with the Missouri River. It is planned to be "as deep as 90 feet (27.4 m)" below the riverbed.

In South Dakota, the pipeline travels 274 miles (441 km) through 12 counties: Campbell, McPherson, Edmunds, Faulk and Spink. The system includes one electric pump station.

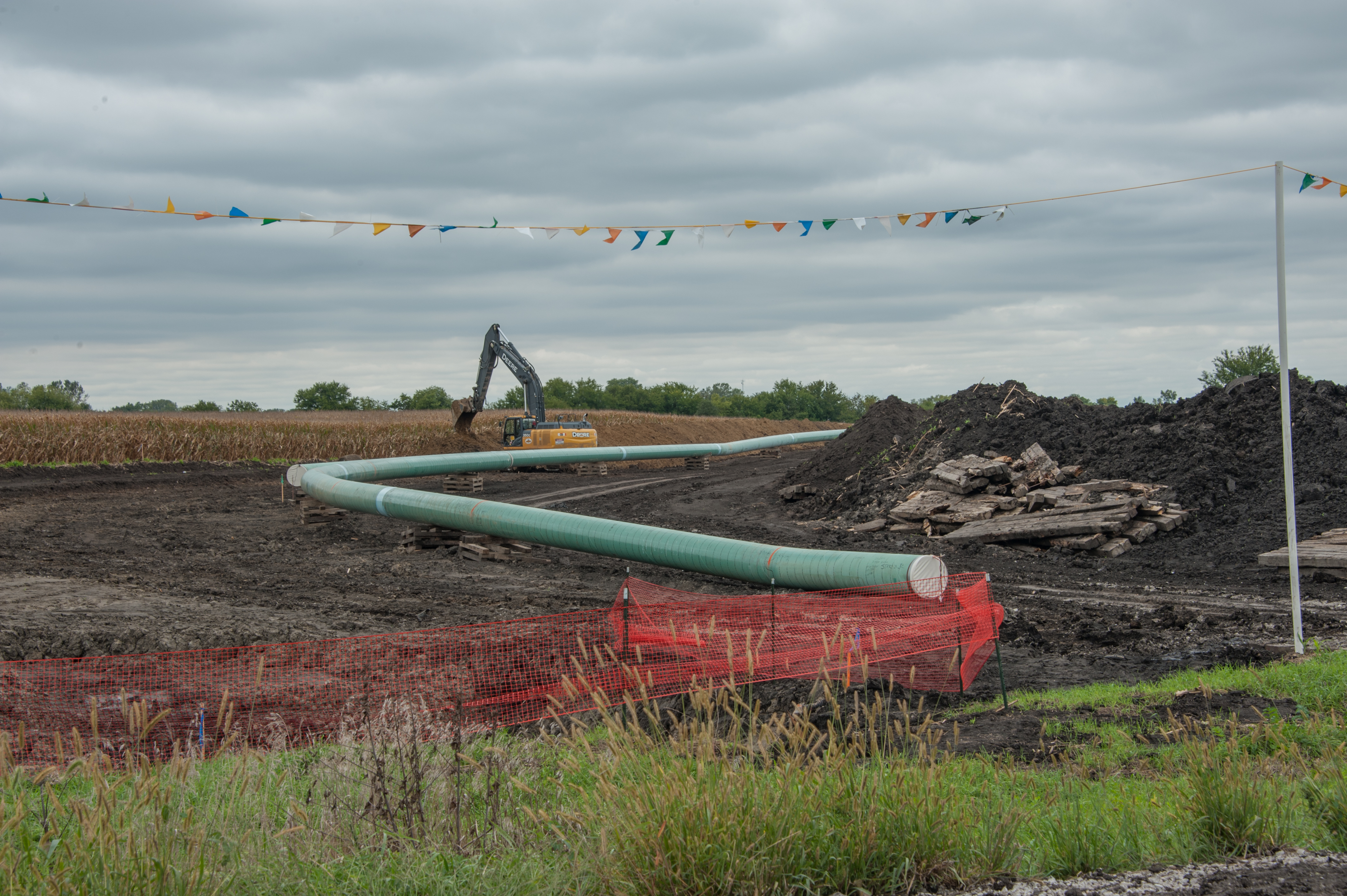
Dakota Access Pipeline being built in central Iowa

In Iowa, the pipeline extends about 347 miles (558 km) diagonally through 18 Iowa counties: Lyon, Sioux, O'Brien, Cherokee, Buena Vista Sac, Calhoun, Webster, Boone, Story (which will have a pumping station), Polk, Jasper, Mahaska Keokuk, Wapello, Jefferson, Van Buren, and Lee. The system includes one electric pump station.

In Illinois, the 177-mile (285 km) route traverses 12 counties.

== Federal agencies permissions ==
Most of the pipeline was built with permits issued under state law. Federal jurisdiction arises through the United States Army Corps of Engineers for 37 miles of the pipeline where it passes over or under streams, rivers, and federal dams. The USACE has conducted a limited review of the route, involving an environmental assessment of river crossings and portions of the project related to specific permits, and issued a finding of no significant impact. It did not carry out an area-wide full environmental impact assessment of the entire effects of the overall project through the four states. The USACE was authorized to grant the following:

- verification of Nationwide Permit #12 permits for 202 crossings of jurisdictional waters under Section 10 of the Rivers and Harbors Act and Section 404 of the Clean Water Act;
- permissions for consent to cross flowage easements acquired and administered by USACE at Lake Sakakawea and Carlyle Reservoir, under Section 14 of the Rivers and Harbors Act of 1899, codified 33 U.S.C. Section 408 (Section 408)
- permissions to modify the Oahe Dam/Lake Oahe project by granting easements to cross federal property administered by USACE for the flood control and navigation project, under Section 408;
- permissions to cross the McGee Creek Levee, the Illinois River navigation channel and the Coon Run Levees, under Section 408;
- permission to horizontally directionally drill under the Mississippi River navigation channel, under Section 408.

On June 14, 2017, a federal judge ordered the federal government to conduct further reviews of the pipeline but did not halt pumping operations. On March 25, 2020, a U.S. District judge ordered the U.S. Army Corps of Engineers to conduct a full environmental review.

== Concerns ==
=== Health and environment ===
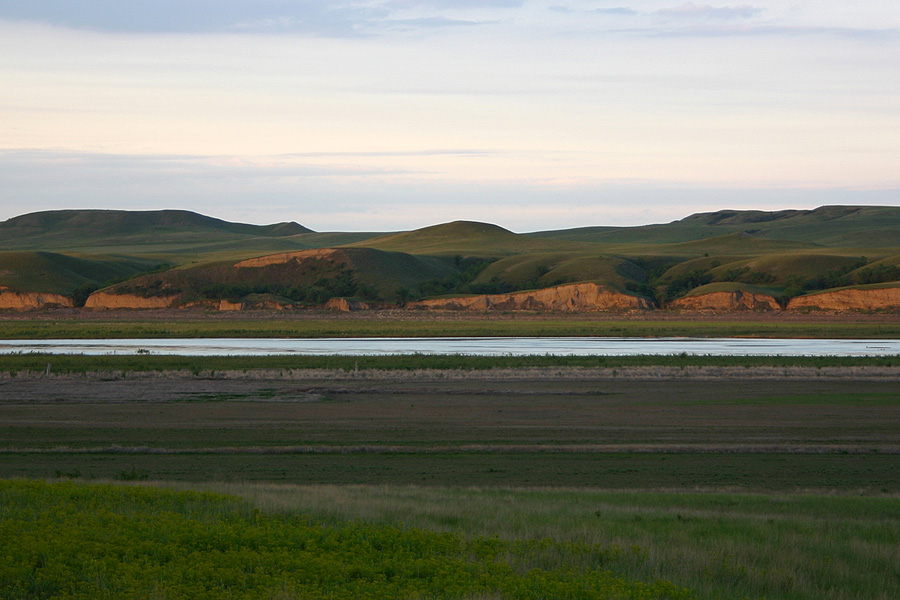
Cannonball River, North Dakota

Prior to construction, some farmers expressed concern about the disturbance of the land, including tiling, soil erosion, and soil quality. They also expressed concerns about potential leaks in the pipeline caused by destabilization in certain areas prone to flooding, which could cause an environmental disaster, as well as the spread of invasive weeds into surrounding land.

In 2014, conservation groups raised concerns about safety, and the impacts on air, water, wildlife and farming, because of the risk of the pipeline disruption. Groups such as Greenpeace, the Science & Environmental Health Network, and in 2016 a group of more than 160 scientists spoke out against the pipeline.

In 2016, environmentalists and Native Americans expressed concerns the Missouri River might become contaminated in the event of a spill or leak. Sioux tribes expressed concern over leaks because the pipeline passes under Lake Oahe, which serves as a major source of water.

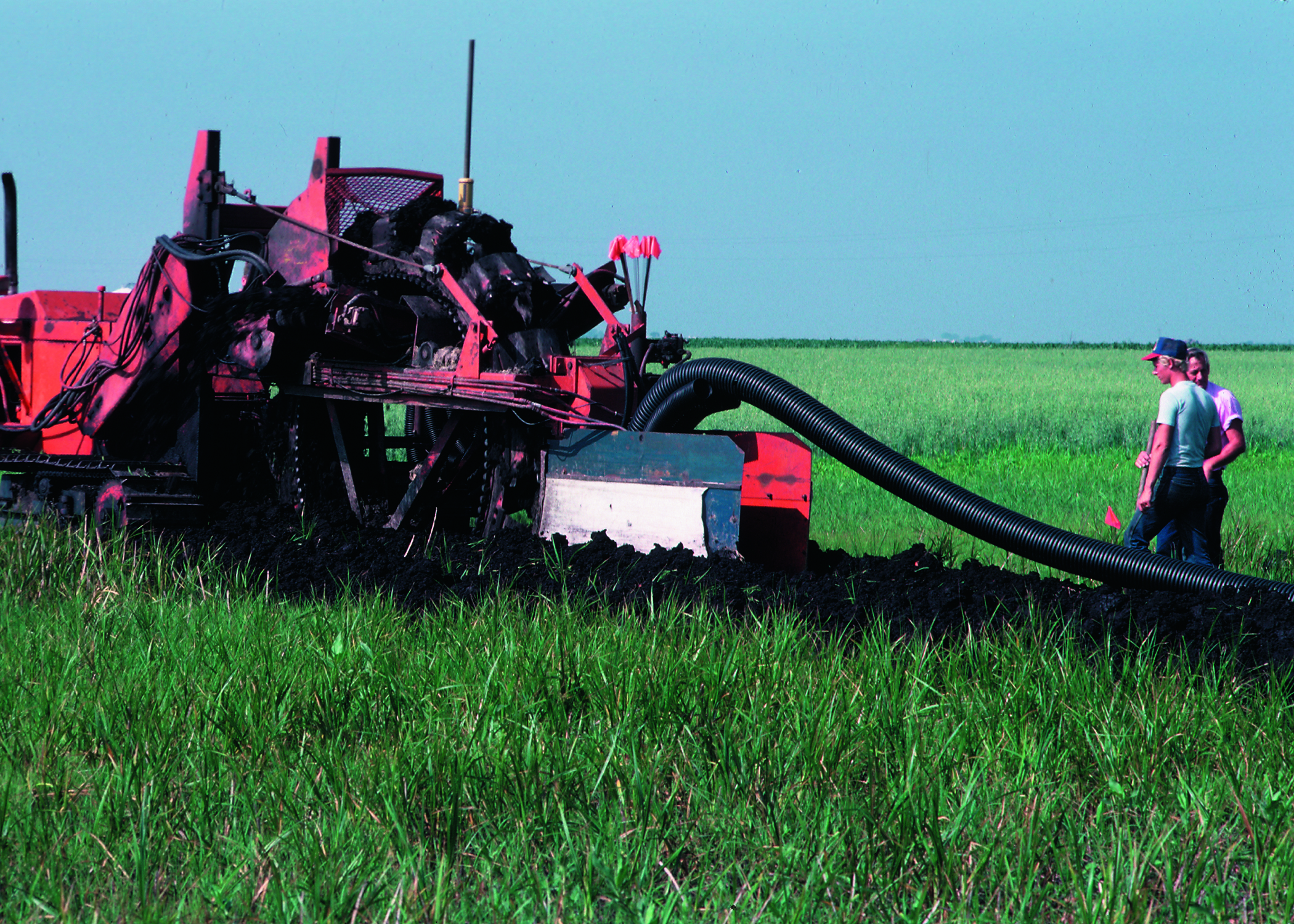
Trenching to install drainage tile in Iowa during the 1980s

=== Eminent domain ===
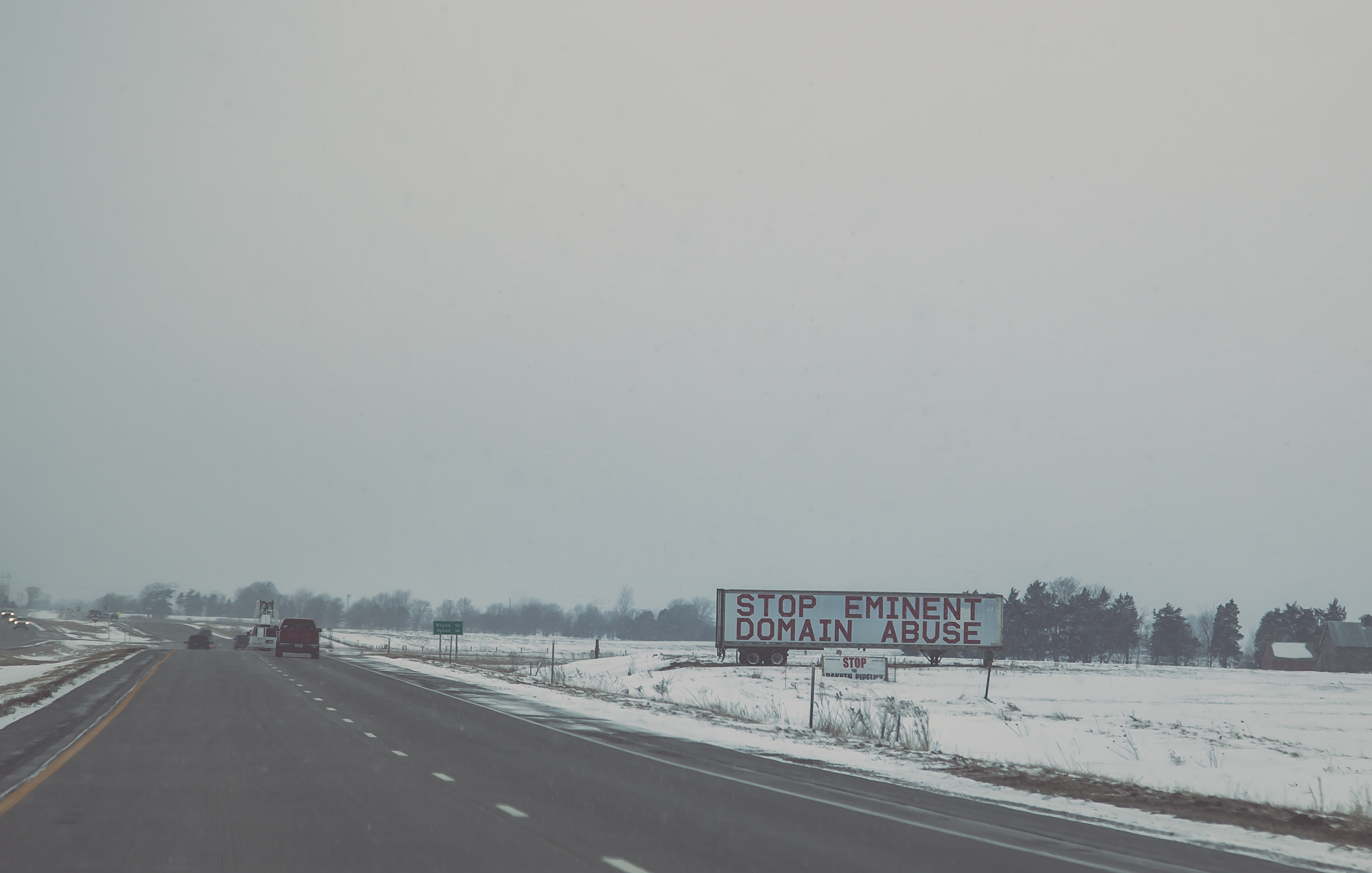
Highway sign objecting to the pipeline in Iowa

In March 2015, a Des Moines Register poll found that while 57% of Iowans supported the Dakota Access Pipeline, 74% were opposed to the use of eminent domain condemnation on behalf of a private corporation. In 2016, landowners across Iowa expressed concern about allowing the use of eminent domain to condemn privately owned land, particularly agricultural land.

In August 2016, Dakota Access, LLC stated that it had already executed easement agreements with 99% of the landowners whose properties were along the four-state route and, with regards to the landowners along the pipeline's route in Iowa, 99% had entered voluntary easements.

=== Tribal positions ===
The pipeline was opposed by the Standing Rock Sioux and the Cheyenne River Sioux tribes, despite it not crossing tribal lands. In September 2014, Standing Rock Chairman Dave Archambault II indicated the tribe's opposition to any pipeline within treaty boundaries encompassing "North Dakota, Montana, Wyoming and South Dakota." The tribe contended that the route would run across sacred sites and be a potential hazard to its water supply. Dakota Access stated the route was chosen based on it running alongside existing infrastructure including railways and other pipelines.

The Mandan, Hidatsa, and Arikara Nation (known as the Three Affiliated Tribes) originally supported the Standing Rock Sioux tribe in its protest of the pipeline. The tribe later argued against shutting down the pipeline, citing significant financial harm to the tribe who uses the pipeline to transport 60 percent of oil produced on its land.

The Meskwaki tribe opposed the pipeline citing concerns that the pipeline could be used as a replacement if the Keystone XL Pipeline is not built.

Saying that "the Corps effectively wrote off the tribe's concerns and ignored the pipeline's impacts to sacred sites and culturally important landscapes", the Standing Rock Sioux Tribe has sued the USACE in the United States District Court for the District of Columbia, accusing the agency of violating the National Historic Preservation Act and other laws, and seeking declaratory and injunctive relief to stop the pipeline. This claim was rejected by the court. U.S. District Judge James E. Boasberg said in the ruling that the USACE "likely complied" with its obligation to consult the tribe and that the tribe "has not shown it will suffer injury that would be prevented by any injunction the Court could issue."

On September 20, 2016, Dave Archambault II addressed the UN Human Rights Council in Geneva, Switzerland, where he called "upon all parties to stop the construction of the Dakota Access Pipeline." Citing the 1851 Treaty of Traverse des Sioux and 1868 Treaty of Fort Laramie, two treaties ratified by the U.S. Senate that recognize the Sioux's national sovereignty, Archambault told the Council that "the oil companies and the government of the United States have failed to respect our sovereign rights." On September 22, 2016, Victoria Tauli-Corpuz, a United Nations expert on the rights of indigenous peoples, admonished the U.S., saying, "The tribe was denied access to information and excluded from consultations at the planning stage of the project, and environmental assessments failed to disclose the presence and proximity of the Standing Rock Sioux Reservation." She also responded to the rights of pipeline protesters, saying, "The U.S. authorities should fully protect and facilitate the right to freedom of peaceful assembly of indigenous peoples, which plays a key role in empowering their ability to claim other rights." According to the USACE's data there had been 389 meetings with more than 55 tribes, including nine meetings with The Standing Rock Sioux Tribe. Kelcy Warren has stated that the company is not on any Native American property.

In December 2016, Trump's Native American Coalition held a meeting where members, American Indian and Alaska Native Tribal leaders, and activists could be present to discuss a wide variety of topics that concerned the effects and implications of the pipeline construction as well as environmental protections and safety concerns.

=== Archaeological surveys ===
Several groups, including the Standing Rock Sioux and the Society for American Archaeology, have raised concerns over the thoroughness of archaeological surveys conducted along the pipeline's corridor. These surveys were carried out under the direction of the USACE, in compliance with the National Historic Preservation Act (NHPA). The NHPA requires consideration of archaeological sites and traditional cultural properties. The initial survey showed 149 sites and the pipeline was subsequently moved to avoid 140 of them. The Advisory Council on Historic Preservation, which oversees compliance with the NHPA, raised two primary concerns to the USACE about the surveys. They criticized the scope of the investigation, which defined each water crossing as a separate project, and therefore failed to consider the pipeline as a whole. They also criticized the lack of tribal involvement in the surveys.

Tribal consultants help archaeologists identify sites that may be harder to see within the archaeological record, such as traditional cultural properties. A traditional cultural property is a property whose "significance derived from the role the property plays in a community's historically rooted beliefs, customs, and practices." The USACE reached out to the Standing Rock Sioux on several occasions for consultation, but were denied. The Sioux refused to participate unless they could consult on the whole pipeline. One instance of tribal consultation at Lake Oahe pointed out several cultural sites and a cemetery that the USACE were previously unaware of.

On September 2, 2016, Tim Mentz, a former historic preservation officer for the Standing Rock Sioux, testified in DC District Court that 27 graves and 82 sacred sites were to be disturbed by the Cannonball river section of the pipeline. That weekend this area was bulldozed. On September 21, 2016, 1,281 anthropologists, archaeologists, museum officials, and others signed and released a letter in support of the tribal community, calling for further study of the area to be affected by the pipeline in South Dakota. The Society for American Archaeologists also sent a letter to the USACE, detailing their organizations concerns over the project.

According to the North Dakota State Historic Preservation Office, the areas highlighted by Tim Mentz were evaluated by state officials on both September 21 and October 20, 2016. They found that only four stone features would be directly impacted by the pipeline. However, many are still concerned about the cumulative effect the project may have on sites that lie outside the 150-foot corridor. Jon Eagle, a Historic Preservation Officer for the tribe, was invited to participate in the evaluation on September 23, but was not allowed access to the areas of the corridor on private property. The tribe insists that evidence was destroyed by the construction company, as grading had gone on in the area previously.

=== Political ties ===
According to his federal disclosure forms, filed in May 2016, President Donald Trump held between $15,000 and $50,000 in stock in Energy Transfer Partners—down from $500,000 to $1 million in 2015—and between $100,000 and $250,000 in Phillips 66. The Washington Post reported that Trump sold off his shares in Energy Transfer Partners in the summer of 2016. The senior Democrat on the Public Resources Committee, Raúl Grijalva, called this appearance of conflict of interest "disturbing".

Energy Transfer Partners CEO Kelcy Warren contributed $6 million to the Rick Perry 2016 presidential campaign, as well as $103,000 to the Donald Trump 2016 presidential campaign.

== Protests ==
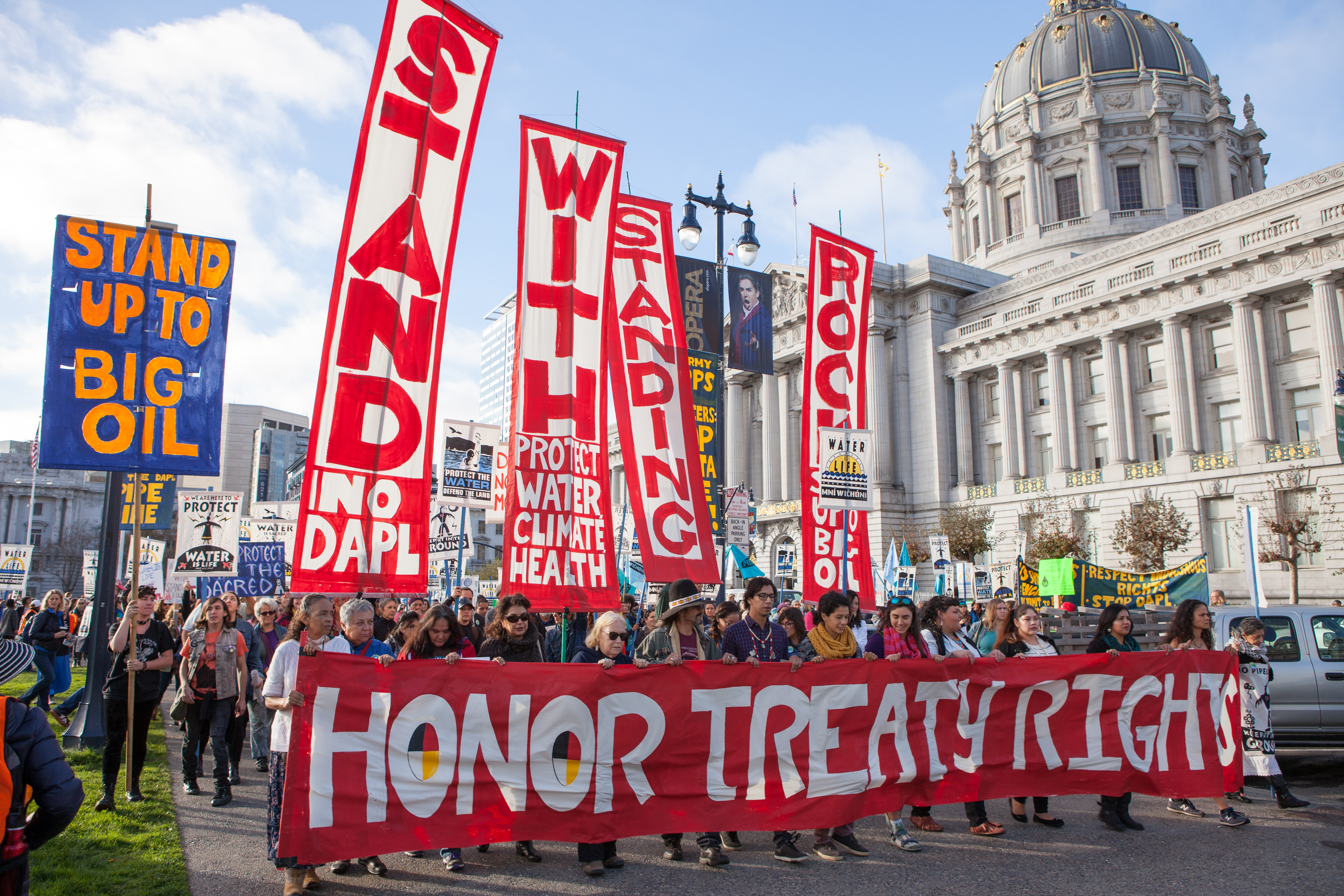
Standing Rock solidarity march in San Francisco, November 2016

In the spring of 2016 protests began at pipeline construction sites in North Dakota and drew indigenous people, calling themselves water protectors and land defenders, from throughout North America as well as many other supporters, creating the largest gathering of Native Americans in the past hundred years.

In April 2016, a Standing Rock Sioux elder established a camp near the Missouri River at the site of Sacred Stone Camp, located within the Standing Rock Sioux Reservation, as a center for cultural preservation and spiritual resistance to the pipeline, and over the summer the camp grew to thousands of people. In July, ReZpect Our Water, a group of Native American youth, ran from Standing Rock in North Dakota to Washington, DC to raise awareness of what they perceive as a threat to their people's drinking water and that of everyone who relies on the Missouri and Mississippi rivers for drinking water and irrigation.

While the protests drew international attention and were said to be "reshaping the national conversation for any environmental project that would cross the Native American land", there was limited mainstream media coverage of the events in the United States until early September 2016. At that time, construction workers bulldozed a section of land that tribal historic preservation officers had documented as a historic, sacred site, and when protesters entered the area security workers used attack dogs, which bit at least five of the protesters. The incident was filmed and viewed by several million people on YouTube and other social media. In late October, armed soldiers and police with riot gear and military equipment cleared an encampment that was directly in the proposed pipeline's path.

According to state and federal authorities, there were several cases of arson that damaged pipeline construction equipment in Iowa during 2016. One deliberately set fire caused nearly $1 million in damage to construction equipment in August in Jasper County, Iowa. Two other fires involving pipeline construction equipment were set around the same time in the same county and another was set in Mahaska County. In October, another arson fire caused $2 million worth of damage to pipeline construction equipment in Jasper County, Iowa.

== See also ==
- List of natural gas pipelines in North America
- List of oil pipelines in North America
- List of pipeline accidents
- List of oil refineries in North America
- Environmental racism in the United States
