= CUSB Bank =

American bank based in Iowa

- Industry: Financial services
- Founded: 1888; 138 years ago
- Headquarters: Cresco, Iowa, U.S.
- Number of locations: 7
- Key people: J. Scott Thomson, chief executive officer and chair
- Products: Banking, investments
- Website: www.cusb.com

CUSB Bank, formerly known as Cresco Union Savings Bank and C US Bank, is a family-owned state-chartered bank based in Cresco, Iowa. It was founded in 1888 and provides residential, commercial and agricultural loans. The bank has locations in Cresco, Lime Springs, Ridgeway, Osage and Charles City.
