= Nick Wagner =

American politician and electrical engineer (born 1973)

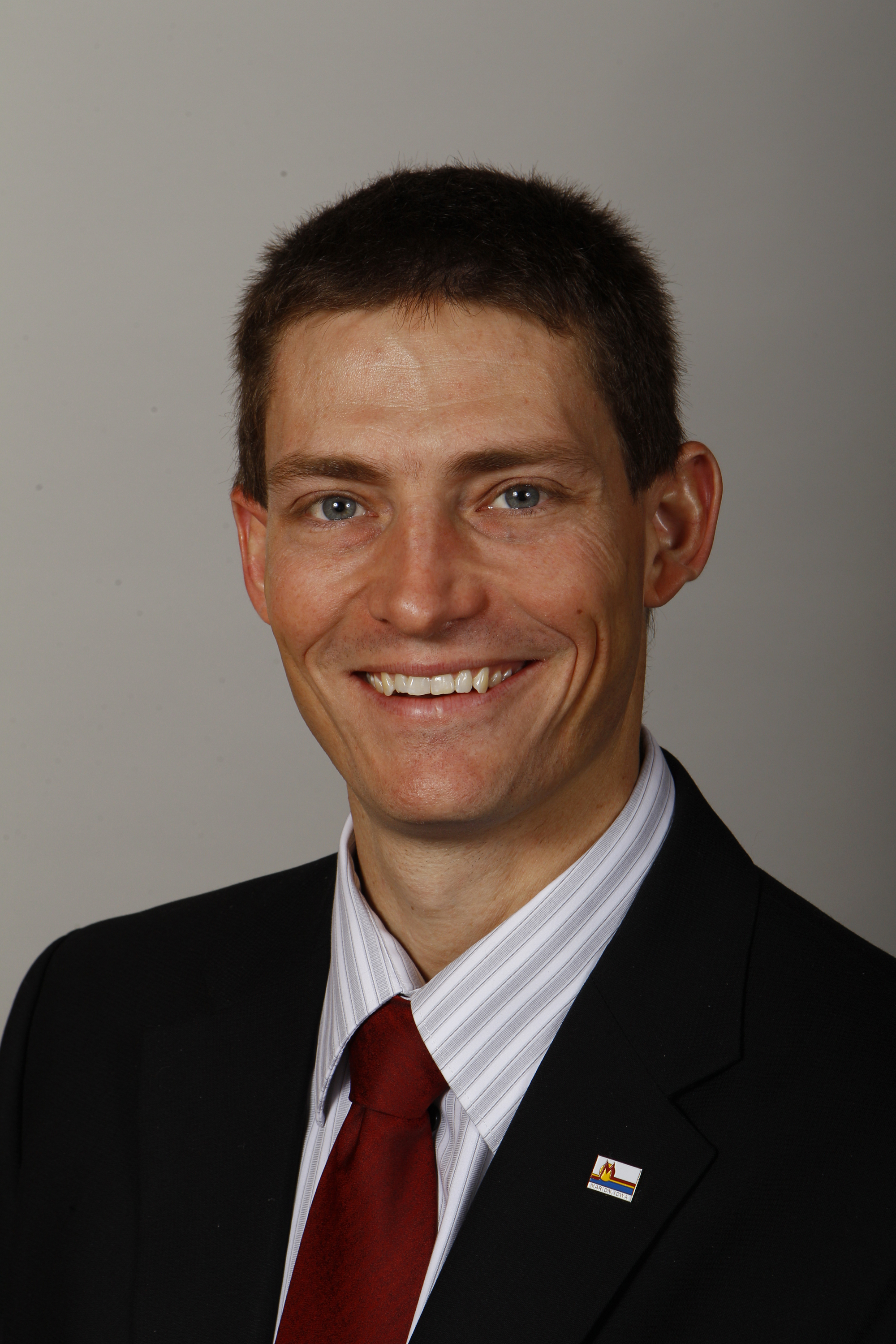
Nick Wagner

Nick Wagner (born 4 November 1973) is a Republican party politician. He is an electrical engineer who served four years on the Marion, Iowa city council before his election to the Iowa House of Representatives in 2008, where he served two terms. He was a commissioner of the Iowa Utilities Board from 2013 to 2020. Since July 2020, he is Vice President of Colorado Regulatory Affairs & Policy with Black Hills Energy in Denver, Colorado.

== Early life and education ==
Wagner holds bachelor's and master's degrees from the University of Iowa. He studied electrical engineering.

== Career ==
Wagner worked as Director of Quality Management for the ESCO Group in Marion. He served four years on the Marion, Iowa city council before his election to the Iowa House of Representatives in 2008, where he served two terms. In May 2013, he became a member of the Iowa Utilities Board; deliberating on the Bakken pipeline, he was asked in February 2016 to recuse himself for a conflict of interest, but refused to do so.

In June 2016 he voted alongside Libby Jacobs in favor and against Chairwoman Geri Huser to allow the controversial construction of the Bakken pipeline to continue. In November 2018, he became President of the National Association of Regulatory Utility Commissioners (NARUC).

In July 2020, he became Vice President of Colorado Regulatory Affairs & Policy with Black Hills Energy in Denver, Colorado.

== Personal life ==
Wagner lived in Marion, IA until he moved to Denver in 2020.

== Sources ==
- Iowa Republicans bio of Wagner
- Iowa legislature bio of Wagner
