= 2026 Iowa House of Representatives election =

- November 3, 2026

All 100 seats in the Iowa House of Representatives 51 seats needed for a majority
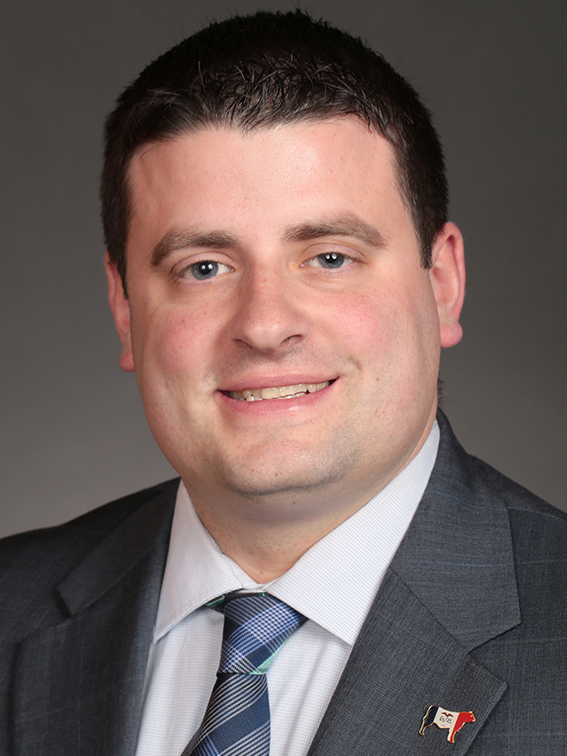

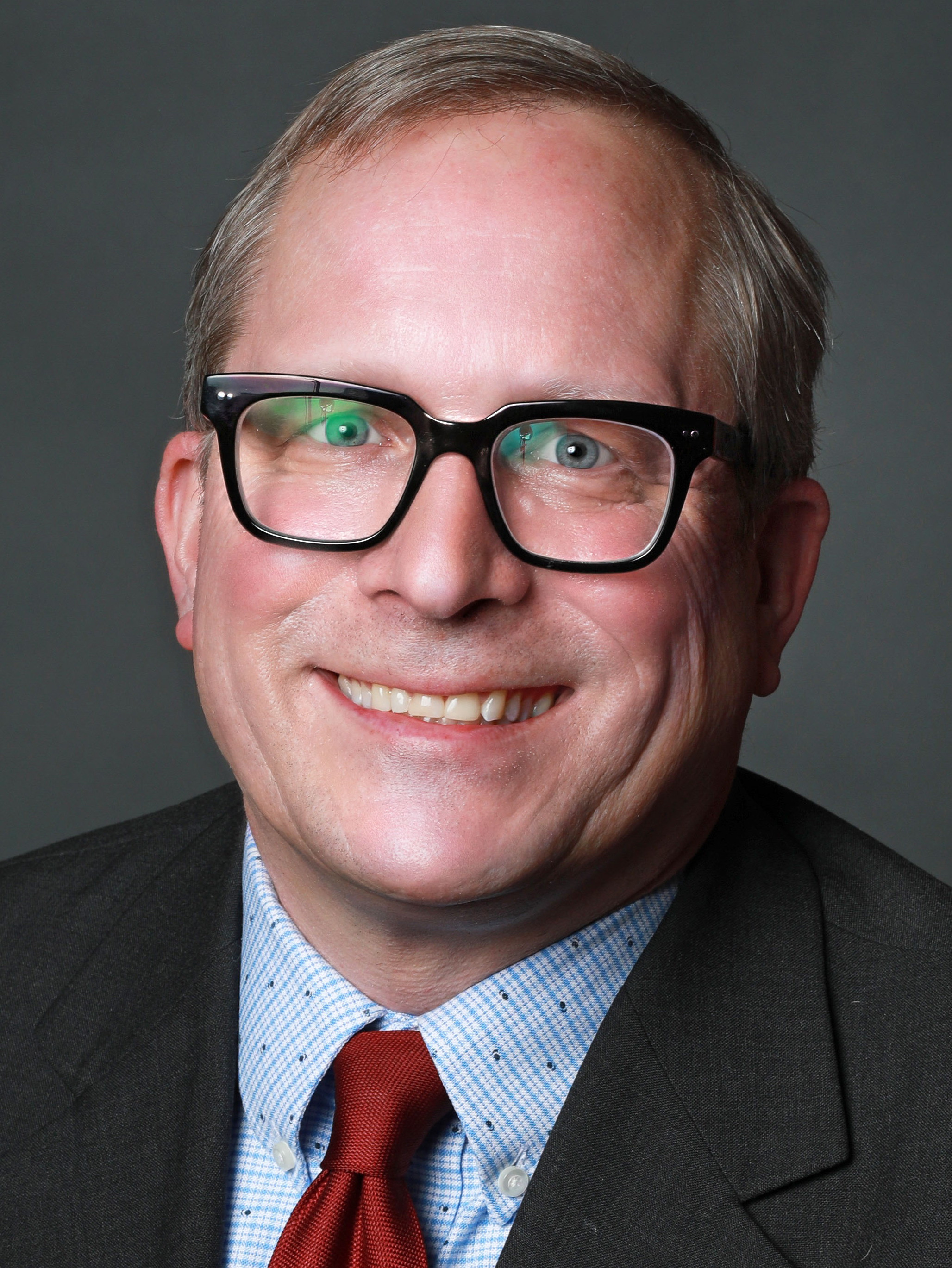
	Majority party	Minority party
Leader	Pat Grassley	Brian Meyer
Party	Republican	Democratic
Leader since	January 13, 2020	May 15, 2025
Leader's seat	57th district	29th district
Seats before	67	33
Seats won	56	44
Seat change	11 ▼	11 ▲
- Legend: Democratic hold Democratic gain Republican hold Republican gain
Speaker of the House before election
Pat Grassley
Republican
Elected Speaker of the House
Pat Grassley
Republican

The 2026 Iowa House of Representatives election was held on November 3, 2026, alongside the Iowa Senate election and the other 2026 United States elections. Voters will elect members of the Iowa House of Representatives in all 100 of the U.S. state of Iowa's legislative districts to serve a two-year term.

== Retirements ==
=== Republicans ===
- District 3: Tom Jeneary is retiring.
- District 5: Zach Dieken is retiring.
- District 7: Mike Sexton retired to accept a federal appointment in the USDA. (Note: Wendy Larson won a 2025 special election to fill Sexton's seat.)
- District 15: Matt Windschitl is retiring to run for U.S. Congress. (Note: Windschitl suspended his campaign in February 2026 and will not run to retain his seat in the House.)
- District 37: Barb Kniff McCulla is retiring to run for the Iowa Senate.
- District 38: Jon Dunwell resigned.
- District 43: Eddie Andrews is retiring to run for governor.
- District 55: Shannon Latham is retiring.
- District 100: Martin Graber died on January 31, 2025. (Note: Blaine Watkins won a 2025 special election to fill Graber's seat.)

=== Democrats ===
- District 1: J.D. Scholten is retiring.
- District 20: Josh Turek is retiring to run for the U.S. Senate.
- District 32: Jennifer Konfrst is retiring to run for U.S. Congress. (Note: Konfrst suspended her campaign in January 2026 and endorsed Sarah Trone Garriott.)
- District 33: Ruth Ann Gaines is retiring.
- District 39: Rick Olson is retiring.
- District 42: Heather Matson is retiring to run for Iowa Senate.
- District 61: Timi Brown-Powers is retiring to run for the Iowa Senate.
- District 71: Lindsay James is retiring to run for U.S. Congress.
- District 75: Bob Kressig is retiring.
- District 78: Sami Scheetz resigned in April 2025 to serve on the Linn County Board of Supervisors. (Note: Angel Ramirez won an April 2025 special election to fill Scheetz's seat.)
- District 98: Monica Kurth is retiring.

== Incumbents defeated ==
=== In primaries ===
==== Democrats ====
1. District 97: Ken Croken lost renomination to Adam Peters.

==== Republicans ====
1. District 45: Brian Lohse (Note: Lohse disaffiliated with the Republican Party after his primary loss.) lost renomination to Austin Stubbs.
2. District 60: Jane Bloomingdale lost renomination to Dani Ollenburg.

== Predictions ==
Source	Ranking	As of
Sabato's Crystal Ball	Likely R	January 22, 2026
State Navigate	Likely R	August 27, 2026

== Summary of results by Iowa House district ==
Italics denote a retiring Representative; bold text denotes a gain for a party.

Iowa House District	2024 Pres.	Incumbent	Party	Elected Representative	Party
District 1	R+1.6	J.D. Scholten	Dem	Shawn Olorundami	Dem
District 2	R+18.6	Robert Henderson	Rep	Robert Henderson	Rep
District 3	R+57.1	Tom Jeneary	Rep	Robert Driesen	Rep
District 4	R+73.3	Skyler Wheeler	Rep	Skyler Wheeler	Rep
District 5	R+56.4	Zach Dieken	Rep	Keith Glienke	Rep
District 6	R+36.2	Megan Jones	Rep	Megan Jones	Rep
District 7	R+50.6	Wendy Larson	Rep	Wendy Larson	Rep
District 8	R+26.7	Ann Meyer	Rep	Ann Meyer	Rep
District 9	R+38.8	Henry Stone	Rep	Henry Stone	Rep
District 10	R+43.1	John Wills	Rep	John Wills	Rep
District 11	R+40.7	Craig Williams	Rep	Craig Williams	Rep
District 12	R+45.7	Steven Holt	Rep	Steven Holt	Rep
District 13	R+53.6	Travis Sitzmann	Rep	Travis Sitzmann	Rep
District 14	R+26.8	Jacob Bossman	Rep	Jacob Bossman	Rep
District 15	R+35.1	Matt Windschitl	Rep	Jason Sherer	Rep
District 16	R+42.3	David Sieck	Rep	David Sieck	Rep
District 17	R+44.0	Devon Wood	Rep	Devon Wood	Rep
District 18	R+40.3	Tom Moore	Rep	Tom Moore	Rep
District 19	R+8.7	Brent Siegrist	Rep	Brent Siegrist	Rep
District 20	R+8.2	Josh Turek	Dem	Eric Armstrong	Dem
District 21	R+23.5	Brooke Boden	Rep	Brooke Boden	Rep
District 22	R+20.6	Samantha Fett	Rep	Samantha Fett	Rep
District 23	R+40.7	Ray Sorensen	Rep	Ray Sorensen	Rep
District 24	R+47.7	Sam Wengryn	Rep	Sam Wengryn	Rep
District 25	R+28.1	Hans Wilz	Rep	Hans Wilz	Rep
District 26	R+50.2	Austin Harris	Rep	Austin Harris	Rep
District 27	D+0.9	Kenan Judge	Dem	Kenan Judge	Dem
District 28	R+1.7	David Young	Rep	**Tom Walton**	**Dem**
District 29	D+15.6	Brian Meyer	Dem	Brian Meyer	Dem
District 30	D+17.8	Megan Srinivas	Dem	Megan Srinivas	Dem
District 31	D+14.9	Mary Madison	Dem	Mary Madison	Dem
District 32	D+19.8	Jennifer Konfrst	Dem	Mike Jones	Dem
District 33	D+24.6	Ruth Ann Gaines	Dem	Ivette Muhammad	Dem
District 34	D+47.1	Rob Johnson	Dem	Rob Johnson	Dem
District 35	D+38.0	Sean Bagniewski	Dem	Sean Bagniewski	Dem
District 36	D+52.0	Austin Baeth	Dem	Austin Baeth	Dem
District 37	R+44.3	Barb Kniff McCulla	Rep	Jason Sandholdt	Rep
District 38	R+24.6	Jon Dunwell	Rep	Matthew Oleson	Rep
District 39	R+0.8	Rick Olson	Dem	Nate Boulton	Dem
District 40	R+7.5	Bill Gustoff	Rep	**Heather Sievers**	**Dem**
District 41	R+3.4	Ryan Weldon	Rep	**Molly Buck**	**Dem**
District 42	R+0.6	Heather Matson	Dem	Amy Tagliareni	Dem
District 43	D+4.1	Eddie Andrews	Rep	**Jill Alesch**	**Dem**
District 44	D+9.7	Larry McBurney	Dem	Larry McBurney	Dem
District 45	R+23.8	Brian Lohse	Rep	Austin Stubbs	Rep
District 46	R+8.7	Dan Gehlbach	Rep	**Mandy Newton Rosenow**	**Dem**
District 47	R+28.6	Carter Nordman	Rep	Carter Nordman	Rep
District 48	R+17.7	Chad Behn	Rep	Chad Behn	Rep
District 49	D+24.5	Beth Wessel-Kroeschell	Dem	Beth Wessel-Kroeschell	Dem
District 50	D+29.4	Ross Wilburn	Dem	Ross Wilburn	Dem
District 51	R+21.3	Brett Barker	Rep	Brett Barker	Rep
District 52	R+7.2	David Blom	Rep	**Mike Tupper**	**Dem**
District 53	R+19.3	Dean Fisher	Rep	Dean Fisher	Rep
District 54	R+39.1	Joshua Meggers	Rep	Joshua Meggers	Rep
District 55	R+32.3	Shannon Latham	Rep	Beau Klaver	Rep
District 56	R+44.4	Mark Thompson	Rep	Mark Thompson	Rep
District 57	R+28.0	Pat Grassley	Rep	Pat Grassley	Rep
District 58	R+33.1	Charley Thomson	Rep	Charley Thomson	Rep
District 59	R+5.2	Christian Hermanson	Rep	**Jacob Welper**	**Dem**
District 60	R+29.1	Jane Bloomingdale	Rep	Dani Ollenburg	Rep
District 61	D+4.5	Timi Brown-Powers	Dem	Vincent Collis	Dem
District 62	D+22.0	Jerome Amos Jr.	Dem	Jerome Amos Jr.	Dem
District 63	R+18.0	Michael Bergan	Rep	Michael Bergan	Rep
District 64	R+34.7	Jason Gearhart	Rep	Jason Gearhart	Rep
District 65	R+25.6	Shannon Lundgren	Rep	Shannon Lundgren	Rep
District 66	R+30.9	Steven Bradley	Rep	Steven Bradley	Rep
District 67	R+32.9	Craig Johnson	Rep	Craig Johnson	Rep
District 68	R+30.4	Chad Ingels	Rep	Chad Ingels	Rep
District 69	R+12.4	Tom Determann	Rep	**Randy Meier**	**Dem**
District 70	R+28.6	Norlin Mommsen	Rep	Norlin Mommsen	Rep
District 71	D+7.9	Lindsay James	Dem	Sam Wooden	Dem
District 72	R+1.4	Jennifer Smith	Rep	**Matt Robinson**	**Dem**
District 73	D+6.7	Elizabeth Wilson	Dem	Elizabeth Wilson	Dem
District 74	D+16.4	Eric Gjerde	Dem	Eric Gjerde	Dem
District 75	D+8.8	Bob Kressig	Dem	Drew Stensland	Dem
District 76	R+18.2	Derek Wulf	Rep	Matt Reisetter	Rep
District 77	D+12.1	Jeff Cooling	Dem	Jeff Cooling	Dem
District 78	D+32.5	Angel Ramirez	Dem	Angel Ramirez	Dem
District 79	D+16.7	Tracy Ehlert	Dem	Tracy Ehlert	Dem
District 80	D+9.3	Aime Wichtendahl	Dem	Aime Wichtendahl	Dem
District 81	D+1.3	Daniel Gosa	Dem	Daniel Gosa	Dem
District 82	R+22.3	Bobby Kaufmann	Rep	Bobby Kaufmann	Rep
District 83	R+10.7	Cindy Golding	Rep	Cindy Golding	Rep
District 84	R+27.7	Thomas Gerhold	Rep	Thomas Gerhold	Rep
District 85	D+28.2	Amy Nielsen	Dem	Amy Nielsen	Dem
District 86	D+49.6	David Jacoby	Dem	David Jacoby	Dem
District 87	R+20.9	Jeff Shipley	Rep	Jeff Shipley	Rep
District 88	R+49.0	Helena Hayes	Rep	Helena Hayes	Rep
District 89	D+51.9	Elinor Levin	Dem	Elinor Levin	Dem
District 90	D+53.2	Adam Zabner	Dem	Adam Zabner	Dem
District 91	R+12.9	Judd Lawler	Rep	Judd Lawler	Rep
District 92	R+15.2	Heather Hora	Rep	Heather Hora	Rep
District 93	R+8.1	Gary Mohr	Rep	Gary Mohr	Rep
District 94	R+7.9	Mike Vondran	Rep	Mike Vondran	Rep
District 95	R+41.0	Taylor Collins	Rep	Taylor Collins	Rep
District 96	R+12.5	Mark Cisneros	Rep	**Nick Salazar**	**Dem**
District 97	D+19.1	Ken Croken	Dem	Adam Peters	Dem
District 98	R+1.7	Monica Kurth	Dem	Andrew Fitzgerald	Dem
District 99	R+8.3	Matthew Rinker	Rep	**Jennifer Kirkman**	**Dem**
District 100	R+26.8	Blaine Watkins	Rep	Blaine Watkins	Rep

== Per District Breakdown ==
=== District 1 ===
Incumbent Democrat J. D. Scholten was initially running for US Senate against Joni Ernst, but dropped out endorsing fellow State Rep. Josh Turek. He has indicated his intention to retire from the Iowa House at the end of his current term.

Democratic candidates Kenneth Kroll and Shawn Olorundami ran in the primary, with Olorundami winning. He ran against Republican candidate Josh Steinhoff for this seat in the general election and won, receiving over 60% of the votes.

District 1 General Election
Party	Candidate	Votes	%
Democratic	Shawn Olorundami	4,337	61.9%
Republican	Josh Steinhoff	2,661	38.0%
Write-in		8	0.1
Total votes		7,006	100.0
Democratic hold			

=== District 2 ===
Incumbent Republican Robert Henderson is running for re-election.

=== District 3 ===
Incumbent Republican Tom Jeneary is retiring. Republican Robert Driesen is the only listed candidate running for this seat, and the Democratic primary was canceled.

=== District 4 ===
Incumbent Republican Skyler Wheeler is seeking re-election, and was unopposed in the primary.

=== District 5 ===
Incumbent Republican Zach Dieken is retiring. Farmer Keith Glienke declared his candidacy in January 2026. Glienke graduated from Aurelia High School in 1982, and earned a degree in finance from Buena Vista College in 1989. He served on the Aurelia school board from 1995 to 2007. Glienke defeated Alta-Aurelia teacher Michael Schnoes in the June Republican Party primary. As of June 2026, no Democratic Party candidate contested the Fifth District.

=== District 6 ===
Incumbent Republican Megan Jones will run for re-election.

=== District 7 ===
The incumbent Republican Mike Sexton resigned his seat to accept a federal appointment. Rachel Burns announced her bid for this seat. Wendy Larson won a December 2025 Special Election for this seat. She will seek re-election.

=== District 8 ===
Incumbent Republican Ann Meyer will seek re-election.

=== District 9 ===
Incumbent Republican Henry Stone will seek re-election.

=== District 10 ===
Incumbent Republican and speaker pro tempore John Wills will seek re-election.

=== District 11 ===
The previous incumbent Brian Best announced in January 2024, that this term would be his last, and he left office in 2025. Craig Williams was elected to this seat in 2024. He will seek re-election.

=== District 12 ===
Incumbent Republican Steven Holt will seek re-election.

=== District 13 ===
Incumbent Republican Travis Sitzmann is running for re-election.

=== District 14 ===
Incumbent Republican Jacob Bossman is running for re-election.

=== District 15 ===
Incumbent Republican Matt Windschitl is retiring, and expressed his intent to run for election to Iowa's 4th District in the US House, to replace Randy Feenstra who is running for governor. However, Windschitl has since suspended his campaign and indicated that he will not seek to retain his seat in the House. The Republican primary for this district includes candidates Bryan Holder, Jason Sherer, and Toni Waite.

=== District 16 ===
Incumbent Republican David Sieck is running for re-election.

=== District 17 ===
Incumbent Republican Devon Wood will seek re-election.

=== District 18 ===
Incumbent Republican Tom Moore will seek re-election.

=== District 19 ===
Incumbent Republican Brent Siegrist will seek re-election.

=== District 20 ===
Incumbent Democrat Josh Turek is retiring to run for US Senate.

=== District 21 ===
Incumbent Republican Brooke Boden will seek re-election. Simpson College Associate Dean Spencer Waugh is running for this seat as a Democrat.

=== District 22 ===
Incumbent Republican Samantha Fett will seek re-election.

=== District 23 ===
Incumbent Republican Ray Sorensen is running for re-election.

=== District 24 ===
Incumbent Republican Sam Wengryn will seek re-election.

=== District 25 ===
Incumbent Republican Hans Wilz will seek re-election.

=== District 26 ===
Incumbent Republican Austin Harris will seek re-election.

=== District 27 ===
Incumbent Democrat Kenan Judge will run unopposed for re-election in both the primary and the general election.

=== District 28 ===
Incumbent Republican David Young is running for re-election.

=== District 29 ===
Incumbent Democrat and House Minority leader Brian Meyer will seek re-election.

=== District 30 ===
Incumbent Democrat Megan Srinivas will seek re-election.

=== District 31 ===
Incumbent Democrat Mary Madison will seek re-election.

=== District 32 ===
Incumbent Democrat Jennifer Konfrst is retiring to run for Iowa's 3rd congressional district in the US House, running against Zach Nunn.

=== District 33 ===
Incumbent Democrat Ruth Ann Gaines is retiring. Various candidates will vie for the seat in the district.

=== District 34 ===
Incumbent Democrat Rob Johnson is seeking re-election.

=== District 35 ===
Incumbent Democrat Sean Bagniewski is running unopposed for re-election.

=== District 36 ===
Incumbent Democrat Austin Baeth is running for re-election.

=== District 37 ===
Incumbent Republican Barb Kniff McCulla is retiring to run for the Iowa Senate District 19 seat. Two Republicans, Jason Sandholt and Chase Spencer, are running in the primary.

=== District 38 ===
Incumbent Republican Jon Dunwell is retiring.

=== District 39 ===
Incumbent Democrat Rick Olson announced his retirement. Former Democrat State Senator Nate Boulton announced he is running for this seat.

=== District 40 ===
Incumbent Republican Bill Gustoff is running for re-election.

=== District 41 ===
Incumbent Republican Ryan Weldon is running for re-election. Former state Representative Molly Buck, whom Weldon narrowly defeated in the 2024 election, will try to flip the seat back.

=== District 42 ===
Incumbent Democrat Heather Matson is retiring to run for Iowa Senate. The district was decided by less than 200 votes in the 2024 election. Republican Heather Stephenson, whom Matson narrowly defeated in 2024, will run again, this time against Ankeny Schools board member Amy Tagliareni.

=== District 43 ===
Incumbent Republican Eddie Andrews is retiring to run for governor. The district is considered a swing and is expected to be hotly contested.

=== District 44 ===
Incumbent Democrat Larry McBurney is running unopposed for re-election.

=== District 45 ===
Incumbent Republican Brian Lohse was defeated in a primary by Austin Stubbs.

=== District 46 ===
Incumbent Republican Dan Gehlbach is running for re-election.

=== District 47 ===
Incumbent Republican Carter Nordman is running for re-election.

=== District 48 ===
Incumbent Republican Chad Behn will seek re-election.

=== District 49 ===
Incumbent Democrat Beth Wessel-Kroeschell will seek re-election unopposed.

=== District 50 ===
Incumbent Democrat Ross Wilburn will seek re-election unopposed.

=== District 51 ===
Incumbent Republican Brett Barker is running for re-election. Teresa Perin, a Marshalltown Highschool English teacher, is running for this seat as a Democrat.

=== District 52 ===
Incumbent Republican David Blom is running for re-election. He will face Democrat Mike Tupper in a district that had previously been held by Democrats for two decades prior to Blom's win in 2024.

=== District 53 ===
Incumbent Republican Dean Fisher will seek re-election.

=== District 54 ===
Incumbent Republican Joshua Meggers is running for re-election.

=== District 55 ===
Incumbent Republican Shannon Latham is retiring from the Iowa House to focus on her new role as the executive director of the Iowa FFA Foundation.

=== District 56 ===
Incumbent Republican Mark Thompson will seek re-election.

=== District 57 ===
Incumbent Republican and House Speaker Pat Grassley announced he is running for re-election, instead of a gubernatorial bid. Shawn Ellerbroek, Wartburg College professor of biochemistry, announced his bid for this seat as a Democrat.

=== District 58 ===
Incumbent Republican Charley Thomson will seek re-election. India May is running as a Democrat.

=== District 59 ===
Incumbent Republican Christian Hermanson will seek re-election.

=== District 60 ===
Incumbent Republican Jane Bloomingdale sought re-election but was defeated in the June primary by Dani Ollenburg.

=== District 61 ===
Incumbent Democrat Timi Brown-Powers will retire to run for election to Iowa Senate District 31. Democrat Vincent Collis, unopposed in the primary, will face no-party candidate Lucas Hewitt in the general election.

=== District 62 ===
Incumbent Democrat Jerome Amos Jr. wil seek re-election.

=== District 63 ===
Incumbent Republican Michael Bergan will seek re-election.

=== District 64 ===
Incumbent Republican Jason Gearhart is running for re-election. He will face Democrat Brian Bruening in the general election.

=== District 65 ===
Incumbent Republican Shannon Lundgren was initially retiring to run for Iowa's 2nd congressional district in the US House. Since then, she has dropped out of the race for US House and has indicated she will seek reelection to District 65.

=== District 66 ===
Incumbent Republican Steven Bradley will seek re-election. He will face Democrat Matt English in the general election.

=== District 67 ===
Incumbent Republican Craig Johnson will seek re-election against Democrat Michael Coonrad.

=== District 68 ===
Incumbent Republican Chad Ingels will run for re-election, but will face competition in both the primary and general election.

=== District 69 ===
Incumbent Republican Tom Determann is running for re-election. He will face Democrat Randy Meier.

=== District 70 ===
Incumbent Republican Norlin Mommsen is running for re-election. Central Dewitt Principal George Pickup is running for this house seat as a Democrat.

=== District 71 ===
Incumbent Democrat Lindsay James is retiring to run for Iowa's 2nd congressional district. Democrat Sam Wooden is running unopposed to succeed James.

=== District 72 ===
Incumbent Republican Jennifer Smith will run for re-election against Democrats Eli Licht and Matt Robinson.

=== District 73 ===
Incumbent Democrat Elizabeth Wilson is running unopposed for re-election.

=== District 74 ===
Incumbent Democrat Eric Gjerde is running unopposed for re-election.

=== District 75 ===
Incumbent Democrat and long-time Representative Bob Kressig is retiring. Two University of Northern Iowa graduates entered their names into the race as Democrats, but only one, Drew Stensland, made the final ballot. Kressig has personally endorsed him as his successor.

=== District 76 ===
Incumbent Republican Derek Wulf will seek re-election against Democrat Calvin Horn.

=== District 77 ===
Incumbent Democrat Jeff Cooling will run for re-election unopposed.

=== District 78 ===
Angel Ramirez, who succeeded Sami Scheetz in an April 2025 special election, will seek re-election unopposed.

=== District 79 ===
Incumbent Democrat Tracy Ehlert will seek re-election against Republican Barclay Woerner.

=== District 80 ===
Incumbent Democrat Aime Wichtendahl will seek re-election unopposed.

=== District 81 ===
Incumbent Democrat Daniel Gosa, won the Democratic primary for this district. Dillon Fillion, a 22-year-old student, won the Republican primary for this seat.

=== District 82 ===
Incumbent Republican and House majority leader Bobby Kaufmann is seeking re-election.

=== District 83 ===
Incumbent Republican Cindy Golding will seek re-election unopposed.

=== District 84 ===
Incumbent Republican Thomas Gerhold will seek re-election.

=== District 85 ===
Incumbent Democrat Amy Nielsen will seek re-election unopposed.

=== District 86 ===
Incumbent Democrat David Jacoby will seek re-election unopposed.

=== District 87 ===
Incumbent Republican Jeff Shipley is seeking re-election. Despite the district's strong Republican lean, Shipley is seen as potentially vulnerable due to his long history of highly controversial comments and legislation.

=== District 88 ===
Incumbent Republican Helena Hayes will run for re-election. Gerald D. Hill, convicted sex offender, is running as a Republican. The Democratic primary for this district was canceled.

=== District 89 ===
Incumbent Democrat Elinor Levin is running against Independent Daniel Arch for re-election.

=== District 90 ===
Incumbent Democrat and assistant minority leader Adam Zabner is running for re-election.

=== District 91 ===
Incumbent Republican Judd Lawler is seeking re-election unopposed.

=== District 92 ===
Incumbent Republican Heather Hora is seeking re-election.

=== District 93 ===
Incumbent Republican Gary Mohr is seeking re-election.

=== District 94 ===
Incumbent Republican Mike Vondran is running unopposed for re-election.

=== District 95 ===
Incumbent Republican Taylor Collins is running unopposed for re-election.

=== District 96 ===
Incumbent Republican Mark Cisneros is seeking re-election, with challengers from both parties.

=== District 97 ===
Incumbent Democrat Ken Croken was defeated by Adam Peters in the primary.

=== District 98 ===
Incumbent Democrat Monica Kurth is retiring. Democrat Andrew Fitzgerald and Republican Nathan Ramker are both running for this seat.

=== District 99 ===
Incumbent Republican Matthew Rinker will seek re-election.

=== District 100 ===
Incumbent Republican Blaine Watkins, who was elected in a special election in 2025 after the death of Representative Martin Graber, will seek re-election. He will face former Fort Madison Mayor Matt Mohrfeld.
