= List of members of the 90th session of the Iowa House of Representatives =

List of Iowa Legislators

The Iowa House of Representatives is the lower house of the Iowa General Assembly, the legislature of the U.S. state of Iowa. One State Representative is elected from each of the state's 100 electoral districts, with each House district making up half of a Senate district. The 2023-25 term is part of the 90th General Assembly. As of January 9, 2023, 64 of the seats are held by Republicans and 36 by Democrats. The presiding officer is the Speaker of the House, who is chosen by the majority party and elected by the House. In addition, representatives elect a Speaker Pro Tempore, chosen in the same manner as the Speaker, and the respective party caucuses elect a majority and minority leader, a majority and minority whip, and assistant party leaders.

Representatives serve for two-year terms and are elected in the general election on election day, as part of the presidential and midterm elections. Newly elected representatives are sworn in and begin work on the second Monday of January. The governor calls a special election to replace the representative when a representative resigns or the position becomes vacant before the term is over. . Representatives are not term-limited.

Representatives generally serve on several standing committees and often serve on joint appropriations subcommittees, permanent statutory committees, and various boards and commissions.

== Party composition ==
Party composition as of January 9, 2023.
Affiliation	Members
Republican	64
Democratic	36
Total	100

== Current leadership ==
House leadership as of August 4, 2025
Position	Name	Party	District
Speaker of the House	Pat Grassley	Republican	57
Speaker pro tempore	John Wills	Republican	10
Majority Leader	Bobby Kaufmann	Republican	82
Minority Leader	Brian Meyer	Democratic	29

== State representatives ==
District	Jurisdiction(s) represented	Image	Representative	Party	First elected	Standing committee leader	Appropriations subcommittee member
1	Woodbury		J. D. Scholten	Democratic	2022		Economic Development
2	Woodbury		Robert Henderson	Republican	2022		Education (Vice Chair)
3	Plymouth and Sioux		Thomas Jeneary	Republican	2018	Natural Resources (Chair)	Health and Human Resources
4	Lyon and Sioux		Skyler Wheeler	Republican	2016	Education (Chair)	Education
5	Buena Vista, Cherokee, O'Brien and Osceola		Zach Dieken	Republican	2022	Environmental Protection (Vice Chair)	
6	Clay and Buena Vista	Official Portrait for the 85th General Assembly	Megan Jones	Republican	2012		
7	Calhoun, Pocahontas, Sac and Webster		Mike Sexton	Republican	2014	Agriculture (Chair)	
8	Webster		Ann Meyer	Republican	2018	Health and Human Services (Chair)	Health and Human Services
9	Emmet, Kossuth and Winnebago		Henry Stone	Republican	2020		Economic Development
10	Clay, Dickinson, Kossuth, and Palo Alto		John Wills	Republican	2014		
11	Audubon, Carroll, Shelby and Pottawattamie		Brian Best	Republican	2014	Transportation (Chair)	Transportation, Infrastructure, and Capitals
12	Crawford, Ida, and Shelby		Steven Holt	Republican	2014	Judiciary (Chair)	
13	Cherokee, Monona, Plymouth and Woodbury		Ken Carlson	Republican	2022	Natural Resources (Vice Chair)	
14	Woodbury		Jacob Bossman	Republican	2018	N/A	Transportation, Infrastructure, and Capitals (Chair)
15	Harrison, and Pottawattamie	Official Portrait for the 85th General Assembly	Matt Windschitl	Republican	2006		
16	Fremont, Mills, and Pottawattamie	Official Portrait for the 86th General Assembly	David Sieck	Republican	2015 (Note: First elected in a February 10, 2015 special election.)	Economic Growth and Technology (Vice Chair)	
17	Adams, Page, Ringgold, Taylor and Union		Devon Wood	Republican	2022	Health and Human Services (Vice Chair)	Transportation, Infrastructure, and Capitals
18	Cass, Montgomery, and Page	Official Portrait for the 89th General Assembly	Tom Moore	Republican	2015 (Note: First elected in a December 8, 2015 special election.)	Labor and Workforce (Vice Chair)	
19	Pottawattamie	Official Portrait for the 85th General Assembly	Brent Siegrist	Republican	2020	Administration and Rules (Chair)	Education
20	Pottawattamie		Josh Turek	Democratic	2022	Veterans Affairs (Ranking Member)	Health and Human Services
21	Marion and Warren		Brooke Boden	Republican	2020	Government Oversight (Chair)	Economic Development
22	Warren		Stan Gustafson	Republican	2014 (Note: First elected in a January 7, 2014 special election.)	Ethics (Chair)	
23	Adair, Clarke, Dallas, Madison, and Union		Ray Sorensen	Republican	2018	Economic Growth and Technology (Chair)	
24	Appanoose, Clarke, Decatur, Lucas, and Wayne	Official Portrait for the 85th General Assembly	Joel Fry	Republican	2010		Health and Human Services (Chair)
25	Wapello		Hans Wilz	Republican	2022		Health and Human Services (Vice Chair)
26	Appanoose, Davis, Monroe, Wapello		Austin Harris	Republican	2022	State Government (Vice Chair)	Economic Development
27	Dallas		Kenan Judge	Democratic	2018	Commerce (Ranking Member)	Transportation, Infrastructure, and Capitals
28	Dallas		David Young	Republican	2022	Commerce (Vice Chair)	Administration and Regulation
29	Polk		Brian Meyer	Democratic	2013 (Note: First elected in an October 2013 special election)	Transportation (Ranking Member)	
30	Polk		Megan Srinivas	Democratic	2022		Administration and Regulation
31	Dallas and Polk		Mary Madison	Democratic	2022		Economic Development
32	Polk		Jennifer Konfrst	Democratic	2018	Administration and Rules (Ranking Member); Education Reform (Ranking Member)	
33	Polk	Official Portrait for the 85th General Assembly	Ruth Ann Gaines	Democratic	2010	Ethics (Ranking Member)	
34	Polk	Official Portrait for the 85th General Assembly	Ako Abdul-Samad	Democratic	2006	Local Government (Ranking Member)	Administration and Regulation
35	Polk		Sean Bagniewski	Democratic	2022		Agriculture and Natural Resources
36	Polk		Austin Baeth	Democratic	2022	Environmental Protection (Ranking Member)	Agriculture and Natural Resources
37	Jasper, Mahaska and Marion		Barb McCulla	Republican	2022	Ways and Means (Vice Chair)	
38	Jasper		Jon Dunwell	Republican	2021 (Note: First elected in an October 12, 2021 special election.)	Administration and Rules (Vice Chair)	
39	Polk	Official Portrait for the 85th General Assembly	Rick Olson	Democratic	2004		
40	Polk		Bill Gustoff	Republican	2022	Judiciary (Vice Chair)	Administration and Regulation
41	Polk		Molly Buck	Democratic	2022		Education
42	Polk		Heather Matson	Democratic	2022		Economic Development (Ranking Member)
43	Polk		Eddie Andrews	Republican	2020		
44	Polk	Official Portrait for the 85th General Assembly	John Forbes	Democratic	2012	N/A	Health and Human Services (Ranking Member)
45	Polk		Brian Lohse	Republican	2018		Justice System (Chair)
46	Dallas and Polk		Dan Gehlbach	Republican	2022		Transportation, Infrastructure, and Capitals (Vice Chair)
47	Dallas, Greene and Guthrie		Carter Nordman	Republican	2020		Education (Chair)
48	Boone and Story		Phil Thompson	Republican	2018	Public Safety (Chair)	Justice System
49	Story	Official Portrait for the 85th General Assembly	Beth Wessel-Kroeschell	Democratic	2004	Health and Human Services (Ranking Member)	Justice System
50	Story		Ross Wilburn	Democratic	2020	Judiciary (Ranking Member)	Justice System
51	Marshall and Story	Official Portrait for the 85th General Assembly	Dave Deyoe	Republican	2006	Labor and Workforce (Chair)	
52	Marshall		Sue Cahill	Democratic	2020		Transportation, Infrastructure, and Capitals (Ranking Member)
53	Poweshiek and Tama	Official Portrait for the 85th General Assembly	Dean Fisher	Republican	2012	Environmental Protection (Chair)	
54	Black Hawk, Grundy, and Hardin		Joshua Meggers	Republican	2022		Administration and Regulation (Vice Chair)
55	Franklin, Hamilton, Story and Wright		Shannon Latham	Republican	2020	Local Government (Chair)	Agriculture and Natural Resources
56	Hancock, Humboldt and Wright		Mark Thompson	Republican	2022		
57	Butler and Bremer	Official Portrait for the 85th General Assembly	Pat Grassley	Republican	2006	Education Reform (Chair)	
58	Bremer, Chickasaw, and Floyd		Charley Thomson	Republican	2022		Economic Development (Vice Chair)
59	Cerro Gordo	Official Portrait for the 85th General Assembly	Sharon Steckman	Democratic	2008	Education (Ranking Member)	Administration and Regulation
60	Cerro, Floyd, Mitchell, and Worth		Jane Bloomingdale	Republican	2016	State Government (Chair)	
61	Black Hawk		Timi Brown-Powers	Democratic	2014	Appropriations (Ranking Member)	
62	Black Hawk		Jerome Amos	Democratic	2022		Economic Development
63	Howard, Fayette, and Winneshiek		Michael Bergan	Republican	2016		Administration and Regulation (Chair)
64	Allamakee, Clayton and Dubuque		Anne Osmundson	Republican	2018	Ethics (Chair)	
65	Dubuque		Shannon Lundgren	Republican	2016	Commerce (Chair)	Health and Human Services
66	Jackson, and Jones		Steve Bradley	Republican	2020		Justice System (Vice Chair)
67	Buchanan, Delaware and Dubuque		Craig Johnson	Republican	2022	Education (Vice Chair)	
68	Back Hawk, Buchanan and Fayette		Chad Ingels	Republican	2020	Veterans Affairs (Chair)	Agriculture and Natural Resources
69	Clinton		Tom Determann	Republican	2022	Transportation (Vice Chair)	Administration and Regulation
70	Clinton, Jackson and Scott		Norlin Mommsen	Republican	2014		Agriculture and Natural Resources (Chair)
71	Dubuque	Official Portrait for the 88th General Assembly	Lindsay James	Democratic	2018	Government Oversight (Ranking Member)	
72	Dubuque	Official Portrait for the 85th General Assembly	Charles Isenhart	Democratic	2008		Health and Human Service
73	Linn		Elizabeth Wilson	Democratic	2022		Health and Human Services
74	Linn		Eric Gjerde	Democratic	2020		Justice System
75	Black Hawk	Official Portrait for the 85th General Assembly	Bob Kressig	Democratic	2004	Public Safety (Ranking Member)	Administration and Regulation
76	Black Hawk, Benton, and Tama		Derek Wulf	Republican	2022	Agriculture (Vice Chair)	Agriculture and Natural Resources
77	Linn		Jeff Cooling	Democratic	2022	Labor and Workforce (Ranking Member)	Transportation, Infrastructure, and Capitals
78	Linn		Angel Ramirez	Democratic	2025		
79	Linn		Tracy Ehlert	Democratic	2018		Education (Ranking Member)
80	Linn	Official Portrait for the 85th General Assembly	Art Staed	Democratic	2006; 2012 (Note: First elected in 2006, lost re-election to the House in 2008, elected to the House in 2012.)	Economic Growth and Technology (Ranking Member)	Education
81	Scott		Luana Stoltenberg	Republican	2022		
82	Cedar, Muscatine and Scott	Official Portrait for the 85th General Assembly	Bobby Kaufmann	Republican	2012	Ways and Means (Chair)	
83	Linn		Cindy Golding	Republican	2022	Local Government (Vice Chair)	
84	Benton and Linn		Thomas Gerhold	Republican	2018		
85	Johnson		Amy Nielsen	Democratic	2016	State Government (Ranking Member)	
86	Johnson	Official Portrait for the 85th General Assembly	David Jacoby	Democratic	2003 (Note: First elected in an August 26, 2003 special election.)	Ways and Means (Ranking Member)	
87	Henry, Jefferson, Van Buren		Jeff Shipley	Republican	2018	Government Oversight (Vice Chair)	Justice System
88	Jefferson, Keokuk, and Mahaska		Helena Hayes	Republican	2022		
89	Johnson		Elinor Levin	Democratic	2022		Education
90	Johnson		Adam Zabner	Democratic	2022	Natural Resources (Ranking Member)	Transportation, Infrastructure, and Capitals
91	Iowa and Johnson		Brad Sherman	Republican	2022		
92	Johnson and Washington		Heather Hora	Republican	2022		Agriculture and Natural Resources
93	Scott		Gary Mohr	Republican	2016	Appropriations (Chair)	
94	Scott		Mike Vondran	Republican	2022	Public Safety (Vice Chair)	Justice System
95	Des Moines, Henry, Louisa and Muscatine		Taylor Collins	Republican	2022	Appropriations (Vice Chair)	Education
96	Muscatine		Mark Cisneros	Republican	2020		
97	Scott		Ken Croken	Democratic	2022		Justice System
98	Scott		Monica Kurth	Democratic	2017	Agriculture (Ranking Member)	Agriculture and Natural Resources
99	Des Moines and Lee		Matthew Rinker	Republican	2022	Veterans Affairs (Vice Chair)	Transportation, Infrastructure, and Capitals
100	Lee		Martin Graber	Republican	2020		Economic Development (Chair)

== See also ==
- List of current members of the Iowa Senate
- Iowa House of Representatives
