= List of members of the 91st session of the Iowa House of Representatives =

List of Iowa Legislators

The Iowa House of Representatives is the lower house of the Iowa General Assembly, the legislature of the U.S. state of Iowa. One State Representative is elected from each of the state's 100 electoral districts, with each House district making up half of a Senate district. The 2025-27 term is part of the 91st General Assembly. As of November 11, 2026, 65 of the seats are held by Republicans, 33 by Democrats, one by an independent, and one seat is vacant. The presiding officer is the Speaker of the House, who is chosen by the majority party and elected by the House. In addition, representatives elect a Speaker Pro Tempore, chosen in the same manner as the Speaker, and the respective party caucuses elect a majority and minority leader, a majority and minority whip, and assistant party leaders.

Representatives serve for two-year terms and are elected in the general election on election day, as part of the presidential and midterm elections. Newly elected representatives are sworn in and begin work on the second Monday of January. Should a representative resign from office before his or her term expires, the governor calls a special election to replace the representative. Representatives are not term-limited.

Representatives generally serve on several standing committees and often serve on joint appropriations subcommittees, permanent statutory committees, and various boards and commissions.

== Party composition ==
Party composition as of November 11, 2026.
Affiliation	Members
Republican	65
Democratic	33
Independent	1
Vacant	1
Total	100

== Current leadership ==
House leadership as of February 6, 2026
Position	Name	Party	District
Speaker of the House	Pat Grassley	Republican	57
Speaker pro tempore	John Wills	Republican	10
Majority Leader	Bobby Kaufmann	Republican	82
Minority Leader	Brian Meyer	Democratic	29

== State representatives ==
District	Jurisdiction(s) represented	Image	Representative	Party	First elected	Standing committee leader	Appropriations subcommittee member
1	Woodbury		J. D. Scholten	Democratic	2022	Agriculture (Ranking Member)	Agriculture and Natural Resources
2	Woodbury		Bob Henderson	Republican	2022		Education (Vice Chair)
3	Plymouth and Sioux		Thomas Jeneary	Republican	2018		
4	Lyon and Sioux		Skyler Wheeler	Republican	2016	Education (Chair)	
5	Buena Vista, Cherokee, O'Brien and Osceola		Zach Dieken	Republican	2022		Justice System
6	Clay and Buena Vista	Official Portrait for the 85th General Assembly	Megan Jones	Republican	2012	Transportation (Chair)	Transportation, Infrastructure, and Capitals
7	Calhoun, Pocahontas, and Sac		Wendy Larson	Republican	2025 (Note: Won a December 2025 special election to fill the seat opened by the resignation of Mike Sexton.)		Economic Development
8	Webster		Ann Meyer	Republican	2018		Health and Human Services (Chair)
9	Emmet, Kossuth and Winnebago		Henry Stone	Republican	2020		Federal and Other Funds
10	Clay, Dickinson, Kossuth, and Palo Alto		John Wills; Speaker pro tempore	Republican	2014		
11	Audubon, Carroll, Shelby and Pottawattamie		Craig Williams	Republican	2024	Local Government (Vice Chair)	Agriculture and Natural Resources
12	Crawford, Ida, and Shelby		Steven Holt	Republican	2014	Judiciary (Chair)	
13	Cherokee, Monona, Plymouth and Woodbury		Travis Sitzmann	Republican	2024		Administration and Regulation (Vice Chair)
14	Woodbury		Jacob Bossman	Republican	2018		Transportation, Infrastructure, and Capitals (Chair)
15	Harrison, and Pottawattamie	Official Portrait for the 85th General Assembly	Matt Windschitl	Republican	2006		
16	Fremont, Mills, and Pottawattamie	Official Portrait for the 86th General Assembly	David Sieck	Republican	2015 (Note: First elected in a February 10, 2015 special election.)		Federal and Other Funds (Vice Chair)
17	Adams, Page, Ringgold, Taylor and Union		Devon Wood	Republican	2022	Economic Growth and Technology (Vice Chair)	Agriculture and Natural Resources
18	Cass, Montgomery, and Page	Official Portrait for the 89th General Assembly	Tom Moore	Republican	2015 (Note: First elected in a December 8, 2015 special election.)		Health and Human Services (Vice Chair)
19	Pottawattamie	Official Portrait for the 85th General Assembly	Brent Siegrist	Republican	2020	Administration and Rules (Chair); Transportation (Vice Chair)	Education
20	Pottawattamie		Josh Turek	Democratic	2022		Health and Human Services
21	Marion and Warren		Brooke Boden	Republican	2020	Local Government (Chair)	Education
22	Warren		Samantha Fett	Republican	2024	Education (Vice Chair)	Education
23	Adair, Clarke, Dallas, Madison, and Union		Ray Sorensen	Republican	2018	Economic Growth and Technology (Chair)	Federal and Other Funds
24	Appanoose, Clarke, Decatur, Lucas, and Wayne		Sam Wengryn	Republican	2024	Public Safety (Vice Chair)	Administration and Regulation
25	Wapello		Hans Wilz	Republican	2022		Federal and Other Funds (Chair)
26	Appanoose, Davis, Monroe, Wapello		Austin Harris	Republican	2022	Health and Human Services (Chair)	
27	Dallas		Kenan Judge	Democratic	2018	Commerce (Ranking Member)	Health and Human Services
28	Dallas		David Young	Republican	2022	Commerce (Chair)	
29	Polk		Brian Meyer; Minority Leader	Democratic	2013 (Note: First elected in an October 2013 special election)	Administration and Rules (Ranking Member)	
30	Polk		Dr. Megan Srinivas	Democratic	2022	Appropriations (Ranking Member)	Administration and Regulation
31	Dallas and Polk		Mary Madison	Democratic	2022	Environmental Protection (Ranking Member)	Justice System
32	Polk		Jennifer Konfrst	Democratic	2018		
33	Polk	Official Portrait for the 85th General Assembly	Ruth Ann Gaines	Democratic	2010	Ethics (Ranking Member)	
34	Polk		Rob Johnson	Democratic	2024		Administration and Regulation (Ranking Member)
35	Polk		Sean Bagniewski	Democratic	2022		Agriculture and Natural Resources (Ranking Member)
36	Polk		Dr. Austin Baeth	Democratic	2022		Health and Human Services (Ranking Member)
37	Jasper, Mahaska and Marion		Barb Kniff McCulla	Republican	2022	Labor and Workforce (Chair)	Economic Development
38	Jasper		Vacant				
39	Polk	Official Portrait for the 85th General Assembly	Rick Olson	Democratic	2004		
40	Polk		Bill Gustoff	Republican	2022	Ethics (Chair)	Transportation, Infrastructure, and Capitals
41	Polk		Ryan Weldon	Republican	2024	Appropriations (Vice Chair)	Economic Development (Vice Chair)
42	Polk		Heather Matson	Democratic	2022		Education (Ranking Member)
43	Polk		Eddie Andrews	Republican	2020		
44	Polk		Larry McBurney	Democratic	2024	Government Oversight (Ranking Member)	Economic Development
45	Polk		Brian Lohse	Independent	2018		Justice System (Chair)
46	Dallas and Polk		Dan Gehlbach	Republican	2022		Education (Chair)
47	Dallas, Greene and Guthrie		Carter Nordman	Republican	2020	Ways and Means (Chair)	
48	Boone and Story		Chad Behn	Republican	2024	Agriculture (Vice Chair)	Agriculture and Natural Resources
49	Story	Official Portrait for the 85th General Assembly	Beth Wessel-Kroeschell	Democratic	2004	Health and Human Services (Ranking Member)	Justice System
50	Story		Ross Wilburn	Democratic	2020	Judiciary (Ranking Member)	Administration and Regulation
51	Marshall and Story		Brett Barker	Republican	2024	Health and Human Services (Vice Chair)	Health and Human Services
52	Marshall		David Blom	Republican	2024	Commerce (Vice Chair)	Transportation, Infrastructure, and Capitals
53	Poweshiek and Tama	Official Portrait for the 85th General Assembly	Dean Fisher	Republican	2012	Environmental Protection (Chair)	Economic Development
54	Black Hawk, Grundy, and Hardin		Joshua Meggers	Republican	2022	Labor and Workforce (Vice Chair)	
55	Franklin, Hamilton, Story and Wright		Shannon Latham	Republican	2020		Economic Development (Chair)
56	Hancock, Humboldt and Wright		Mark Thompson	Republican	2022		Justice System (Vice Chair)
57	Butler and Bremer	Official Portrait for the 85th General Assembly	Pat Grassley; Speaker of the House	Republican	2006		
58	Bremer, Chickasaw, and Floyd		Charley Thomson	Republican	2022	Government Oversight (Chair)	Federal and Other Funds
59	Cerro Gordo		Christian Hermanson	Republican	2024	Ways and Means (Vice Chair)	Transportation, Infrastructure, and Capitals
60	Cerro, Floyd, Mitchell, and Worth		Jane Bloomingdale	Republican	2016	State Government (Chair)	
61	Black Hawk		Timi Brown-Powers	Democratic	2014	Higher Education (Ranking Member)	Federal and Other Funds (Ranking Member)
62	Black Hawk		Jerome Amos Jr.	Democratic	2022	Veterans Affairs (Ranking Member)	Administration and Regulation
63	Howard, Fayette, and Winneshiek		Michael Bergan	Republican	2016		Administration and Regulation (Chair)
64	Allamakee, Clayton and Dubuque		Jason Gearhart	Republican	2024	Veterans Affairs (Vice Chair)	Health and Human Services
65	Dubuque		Shannon Lundgren	Republican	2016		
66	Jackson, and Jones		Dr. Steven Bradley	Republican	2020		Transportation, Infrastructure, and Capitals (Vice Chair)
67	Buchanan, Delaware and Dubuque		Craig Johnson	Republican	2022	Ethics (Vice Chair)	
68	Back Hawk, Buchanan and Fayette		Chad Ingels	Republican	2020		
69	Clinton		Tom Determann	Republican	2022	Veterans Affairs (Chair)	Transportation, Infrastructure, and Capitals
70	Clinton, Jackson and Scott		Norlin Mommsen	Republican	2014		Agriculture and Natural Resources (Chair)
71	Dubuque	Official Portrait for the 88th General Assembly	Lindsay James	Democratic	2018		
72	Dubuque		Jennifer Smith	Republican	2024	State Government (Vice Chair)	Administration and Regulation
73	Linn		Elizabeth Wilson	Democratic	2022		Economic Development (Ranking Member)
74	Linn		Eric Gjerde	Democratic	2020	Public Safety (Ranking Member)	
75	Black Hawk	Official Portrait for the 85th General Assembly	Bob Kressig	Democratic	2004		Transportation, Infrastructure, and Capitals
76	Black Hawk, Benton, and Tama		Derek Wulf	Republican	2022	Agriculture (Chair)	Agriculture and Natural Resources
77	Linn		Jeff Cooling	Democratic	2022	Labor and Workforce (Ranking Member)	Transportation, Infrastructure, and Capitals
78	Linn		Angel Ramirez	Democratic	2025 (Note: Won a 2025 special election after the resignation of Sami Scheetz.)		Justice System (Ranking Member)
79	Linn		Tracy Ehlert	Democratic	2018	Education (Ranking Member)	Education
80	Linn		Aime Wichtendahl	Democratic	2024	Economic Growth and Technology (Ranking Member)	Transportation, Infrastructure, and Capitals
81	Scott		Daniel Gosa	Democratic	2024	Transportation (Ranking Member)	Federal and Other Funds
82	Cedar, Muscatine and Scott	Official Portrait for the 85th General Assembly	Bobby Kaufmann; Majority Leader	Republican	2012		
83	Linn		Cindy Golding	Republican	2022	Natural Resources (Vice Chair)	Justice System
84	Benton and Linn		Thomas Gerhold	Republican	2018	Environmental Protection (Vice Chair)	Administration and Regulation
85	Johnson		Amy Nielsen	Democratic	2016	State Government (Ranking Member)	Economic Development
86	Johnson	Official Portrait for the 85th General Assembly	David Jacoby	Democratic	2003 (Note: First elected in an August 26, 2003 special election.)	Ways and Means (Ranking Member)	
87	Henry, Jefferson, Van Buren		Jeff Shipley	Republican	2018	Government Oversight (Vice Chair); Higher Education (Vice Chair)	
88	Jefferson, Keokuk, and Mahaska		Helena Hayes	Republican	2022		Agriculture and Natural Resources (Vice Chair)
89	Johnson		Elinor Levin	Democratic	2022	Natural Resources (Ranking Member)	Education
90	Johnson		Adam Zabner	Democratic	2022	Local Government (Ranking Member)	Agriculture and Natural Resources
91	Iowa and Johnson		Judd Lawler	Republican	2024	Judiciary (Vice Chair)	Justice System
92	Johnson and Washington		Heather Hora	Republican	2022		Education
93	Scott		Gary Mohr	Republican	2016	Appropriations (Chair)	Federal and Other Funds
94	Scott		Mike Vondran	Republican	2022	Public Safety (Chair)	Justice System
95	Des Moines, Henry, Louisa and Muscatine		Taylor Collins	Republican	2022	Higher Education (Chair)	
96	Muscatine		Mark Cisneros	Republican	2020		Administration and Regulation
97	Scott		Ken Croken	Democratic	2022		Transportation, Infrastructure, and Capitals (Ranking Member)
98	Scott		Monica Kurth	Democratic	2017		Federal and Other Funds
99	Des Moines and Lee		Matthew Rinker	Republican	2022		Health and Human Services
100	Lee		Blaine Watkins	Republican	2025 (Note: Won a 2025 special election after the death of Martin Graber.)		Health and Human Services

== See also ==
- List of current members of the Iowa Senate
- Iowa House of Representatives
