= John W. Carlsen =

American politician (1909–1970)

Member of the Iowa House of Representatives from the 45th district
- In office February 1, 1955 – January 11, 1959

Personal details
- Born: May 15, 1909 Clinton, Iowa, U.S.
- Died: April 2, 1970 (aged 60)
- Party: Democratic
- Spouse: Betty E. Moffatt (m. 1938)
- Children: 2
- Education: University of Iowa
- Occupation: Politician, teacher, lawyer

John W. Carlsen (May 15, 1909 – April 2, 1970) was an American politician, teacher, and lawyer.

John W. Carlsen was born to parents Louis P. and Theresa Will Carlsen on May 15, 1909. He attended Lyons High School, in his hometown of Clinton, Iowa, then earned a degree in physical education from the University of Iowa in 1931. Subsequently, Carlsen taught and coached at North English High School for two years. Upon completing his studies at the University of Iowa College of Law in 1937, Carlsen began practicing law alongside the continuation of his teaching and coaching career at Clinton High School. Carlsen coached high school football, wrestling and track until 1941, when he began working for the Federal Bureau of Investigation (FBI). Carlsen left the FBI in 1946 and reestablished his private legal practice. That same year, he was also elected mayor of Clinton, serving in that position through 1947. Between 1949 and 1950, Carlsen was Clinton County Attorney. Between 1955 and 1959, Carlsen occupied the District 45 seat in the Iowa House of Representatives as a Democrat. After stepping down from the state legislature, Carlsen became assistant county attorney, and was appointed to an alternate municipal court judgeship during the Harold Hughes and Robert D. Ray gubernatorial administrations. Clinton died on April 2, 1970.
