= Donald Binneboese =

American politician (1924–2005)

Member of the Iowa House of Representatives from the 49th district
- In office February 24, 1976 – January 10, 1983
- Preceded by: Albert Fullerton
- Succeeded by: Kay Halloran

Personal details
- Born: February 17, 1924 Plymouth County, Iowa, U.S.
- Died: February 28, 2005 (aged 81) Hinton, Iowa, U.S.
- Party: Democratic

Donald Binneboese (February 17, 1924 – February 28, 2005) was an American politician who served in the Iowa House of Representatives from the 49th district from 1976 to 1983.

He died on February 28, 2005, in Hinton, Iowa, at age 81.
