= Mike Jones (Iowa politician) =

American politician

Member of the Iowa House of Representatives from the 32nd district
- Member-elect
- Assumed office January 1, 2027
- Preceded by: Jennifer Konfrst

Personal details
- Party: Democratic
- Education: University of Iowa
- Website: Campaign website

Mike Jones is an American politician. A member of the Democratic Party, he was elected to the Iowa House of Representatives in 2026, representing the 32nd district. He succeeded fellow Democrat Jennifer Konfrst in the 2026 election. He was mayor of Windsor Heights, Iowa.
