= Austin Stubbs =

American politician

Member of the Iowa House of Representatives from the 45th district
- Member-elect
- Assumed office January 1, 2027
- Preceded by: Brian Lohse

Personal details
- Party: Republican
- Website: austinstubbsforiowa.com

Austin Stubbs is an American politician. A member of the Republican Party, he was elected to the Iowa House of Representatives in 2026, representing the 45th district. He succeeded fellow Republican Brian Lohse in the 2026 election. Stubbs was raised on a farm in Pleasant Hill, Iowa.
