= Jason Sandholdt =

American politician

Member of the Iowa House of Representatives from the 37th district
- Member-elect
- Assumed office January 1, 2027
- Preceded by: Barb Kniff McCulla

Personal details
- Party: Republican

Jason Sandholdt is an American politician. A member of the Republican Party, he was elected to the Iowa House of Representatives in 2026, representing the 37th district. He succeeded fellow Republican Barb Kniff McCulla in the 2026 election. He was the sheriff of Marion County, Iowa.
