= Jo Oldson =

American politician (born 1956)

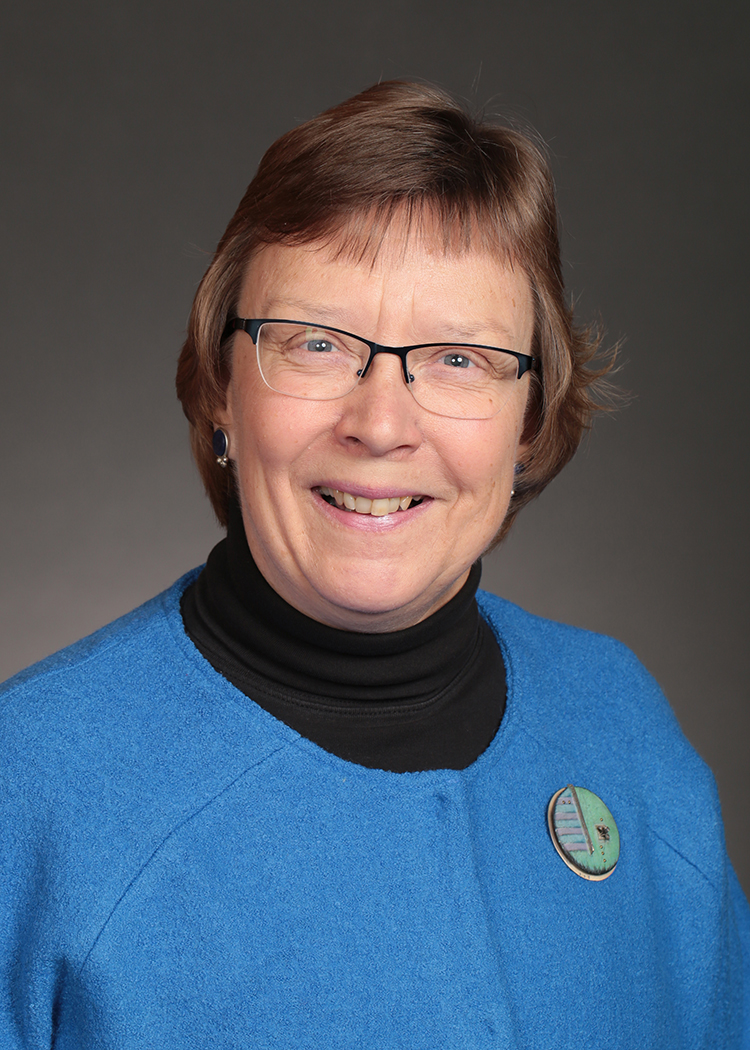

Member of the Iowa House of Representatives from the 41st district 61st (2003–2013)
- In office January 13, 2003 – January 9, 2023
- Preceded by: Jane Greimann
- Succeeded by: Molly Buck

Personal details
- Born: May 15, 1956 (age 70) Eagle Grove, Iowa, U.S.
- Party: Democratic
- Spouse: Brice
- Education: Drake University
- Occupation: Attorney
- Website: legis.iowa.gov/...

Jo Oldson (born May 15, 1956) is an American politician who served as a member of the Iowa House of Representatives for the 41st district. A Democrat, she served in the Iowa House of Representatives from 2003 to 2023. Oldson was born and raised in Eagle Grove, Iowa and resides in Des Moines. She received her BA and JD from Drake University.

As of June 2013, Oldson serves on several committees in the Iowa House – the Commerce and Judiciary committees. She also serves as the ranking member of the Ways and Means committee.

Oldson first won election in 2002, following the 2002 redistricting, winning a three-way primary and defeating incumbent Republican Betty Grundberg from the old 73rd District.

== Electoral history ==
*incumbent

Early 61st District contests

Election	Political result	Candidate	Party	Votes	%
Iowa House of Representatives primary elections, 2002; District 61; Turnout: 2,943	Democratic (newly redistricted)	Jo Oldson	Democratic	1,542	52.4
Iowa House of Representatives primary elections, 2002; District 61; Turnout: 2,943	Democratic (newly redistricted)	Marc Beltrame	Democratic	1,117	38.0
Iowa House of Representatives primary elections, 2002; District 61; Turnout: 2,943	Democratic (newly redistricted)	Carolyn Riley	Democratic	273	9.3
Iowa House of Representatives elections, 2002; District 61; Turnout: 12,387	Democratic (newly redistricted)	Jo Oldson	Democratic	6,520	52.6
Iowa House of Representatives elections, 2002; District 61; Turnout: 12,387	Democratic (newly redistricted)	Betty Grundberg*	Republican	5,846	44.3
Iowa House of Representatives primary elections, 2004; District 61	Democratic	Jo Oldson*	Democratic	unopposed	
Iowa House of Representatives elections, 2004; District 61; Turnout: 15,823	Democratic hold	Jo Oldson*	Democratic	9,339	59.0
Iowa House of Representatives elections, 2004; District 61; Turnout: 15,823	Democratic hold	Joe Grandanette	Republican	6,467	40.9
Iowa House of Representatives primary elections, 2006; District 61	Democratic	Jo Oldson*	Democratic	unopposed	
Iowa House of Representatives elections, 2006; District 61; Turnout: 11,852	Democratic hold	Jo Oldson*	Democratic	7,893	66.6
Iowa House of Representatives elections, 2006; District 61; Turnout: 11,852	Democratic hold	David Payer	Republican	3,945	33.3

Election	Political result	Candidate	Party	Votes	%
Iowa House of Representatives primary elections, 2008; District 61	Democratic	Jo Oldson*	Democratic	unopposed	
Iowa House of Representatives elections, 2008; District 61; Turnout: 15,769	Democratic hold	Jo Oldson*	Democratic	10,519	66.7
Iowa House of Representatives elections, 2008; District 61; Turnout: 15,769	Democratic hold	Eric Kohlsdorf	Republican	5,213	33.1
Iowa House of Representatives primary elections, 2010; District 61	Democratic	Jo Oldson*	Democratic	unopposed	
Iowa House of Representatives elections, 2010; District 61; Turnout: 12,871	Democratic hold	Jo Oldson*	Democratic	7,943	61.7
Iowa House of Representatives elections, 2010; District 61; Turnout: 12,871	Democratic hold	Darlene Blake	Republican	4,274	33.2
Iowa House of Representatives primary elections, 2012; District 41	Democratic (newly redistricted)	Jo Oldson*	Democratic	unopposed	
Iowa House of Representatives general elections, 2012; District 41; Turnout: 18,209	Democratic (newly redistricted)	Jo Oldson*	Democratic	12,055	66.20%
Iowa House of Representatives general elections, 2012; District 41; Turnout: 18,209	Democratic (newly redistricted)	Clarke Davidson	Republican	5,054	27.76%

Iowa House of Representatives
Preceded by Jane Greimann	61st District; 2003–2013	Succeeded by Anesa Kajtazovic
Preceded by Daniel Kelley	41st District; 2013–2023	Succeeded by Molly Buck
