= Jane Greimann =

American schoolteacher and politician

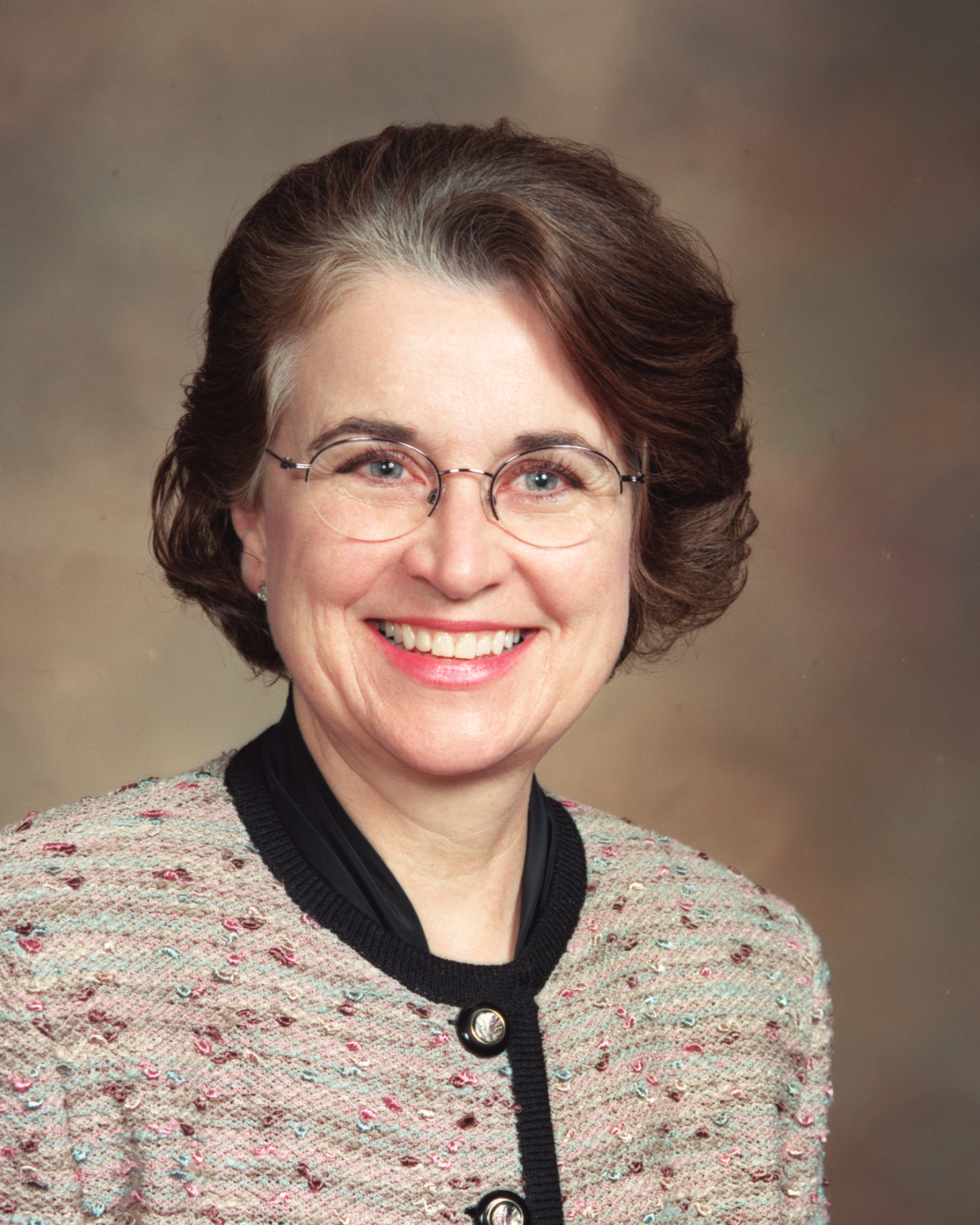

Member of the Iowa House of Representatives from the 45th district
- In office January 13, 2003 – January 9, 2005
- Preceded by: Vicki Lensing
- Succeeded by: Beth Wessel-Kroeschell

Member of the Iowa House of Representatives from the 61st district
- In office November 2, 1999 – January 12, 2003
- Preceded by: Cecelia Burnett
- Succeeded by: Jo Oldson

Personal details
- Born: Jane Linda Renner; January 25, 1942 Klemme, Iowa, U.S.
- Died: February 4, 2006 (aged 64) Ames, Iowa, U.S.
- Party: Democratic
- Education: Iowa State University
- Occupation: schoolteacher

Jane Linda Greimann (January 25, 1942 – February 4, 2006) was an American politician who served on the Iowa House of Representatives from 1999 to 2005.

Jane Greimann was born on January 25, 1942, in Klemme, Iowa, to parents Chet and Ina Mae. She was raised on the family farm, and graduated from Klemme High School in 1960. She studied textile and clothing at Iowa State University and married Lowell Greimann. The couple moved to Boulder, Colorado, where Greimann was a seamstress and office worker, and later, San Antonio, Texas, where she worked with the Latino community and low-income adults. Following the birth of two biological sons, one each while living in Colorado and Texas, Jane and Lowell Greimann moved back to Iowa in 1973 and adopted a Vietnamese child in 1975. Jane Greimann earned her teaching certification in 1980 and taught at Nevada Junior High School in Nevada, Iowa for sixteen years. Greimann was a board member of the Eastern Story County Youth and Shelter Services, retiring in 1998. From 1999 to 2003, Greimann served in the Iowa House of Representatives for District 61. She then represented District 45 until 2005. Greimann died of lung cancer at Israel Family Hospice in Ames, Iowa, on February 4, 2006, and was buried at Iowa State University Cemetery. Following her death, the central committee of the Story County chapter of the Iowa Democratic Party honored Greimann by placing a brick in the Plaza of Heroines outside Catt Hall.
