= Shawn Olorundami =

American politician

Member of the Iowa House of Representatives from the 1st district
- Member-elect
- Assumed office January 1, 2027
- Preceded by: J.D. Scholten

Personal details
- Party: Democratic
- Education: Buena Vista University
- Website: Campaign website

Shawn Olorundami is an American politician. A member of the Democratic Party, he was elected to the Iowa House of Representatives in 2026, representing the 1st district. He succeeded fellow Democrat J. D. Scholten in the 2026 election. He is a teacher by profession. He was a state championship hurdler for Sioux City.
