= Andrew Fitzgerald (politician) =

American politician

Member-elect of the Iowa House of Representatives from the 98th district
- Assuming office January 1, 2027
- Succeeding: Monica Kurth

Personal details
- Party: Democratic

Andrew Fitzgerald is an American politician who is Member-elect of the Iowa House of Representatives from the 98th district.
