= Keith Glienke =

Member-elect of the Iowa House of Representatives from the 5th district
- Assuming office January 1, 2027
- Succeeding: Zach Dieken

Personal details
- Born: 1964 or 1965 (age 61–62)
- Party: Republican
- Education: Buena Vista College (BA)

Keith Glienke is an American farmer and politician who is member-elect of the Iowa House of Representatives from the 5th district.

== Early life and career ==
Glienke graduated from Aurelia High School in 1982 and received a bachelor's degree in finance from Buena Vista College in 1989. He is a grain and livestock farmer. Glienke was a member of the Aurelia Community School District board for 12 years beginning in 1992.

== Personal life ==
Glienke is married to his wife, Marcy, with whom he has three children. He is also an active member of his church.
