= J. D. Scholten =

American politician (born 1980)

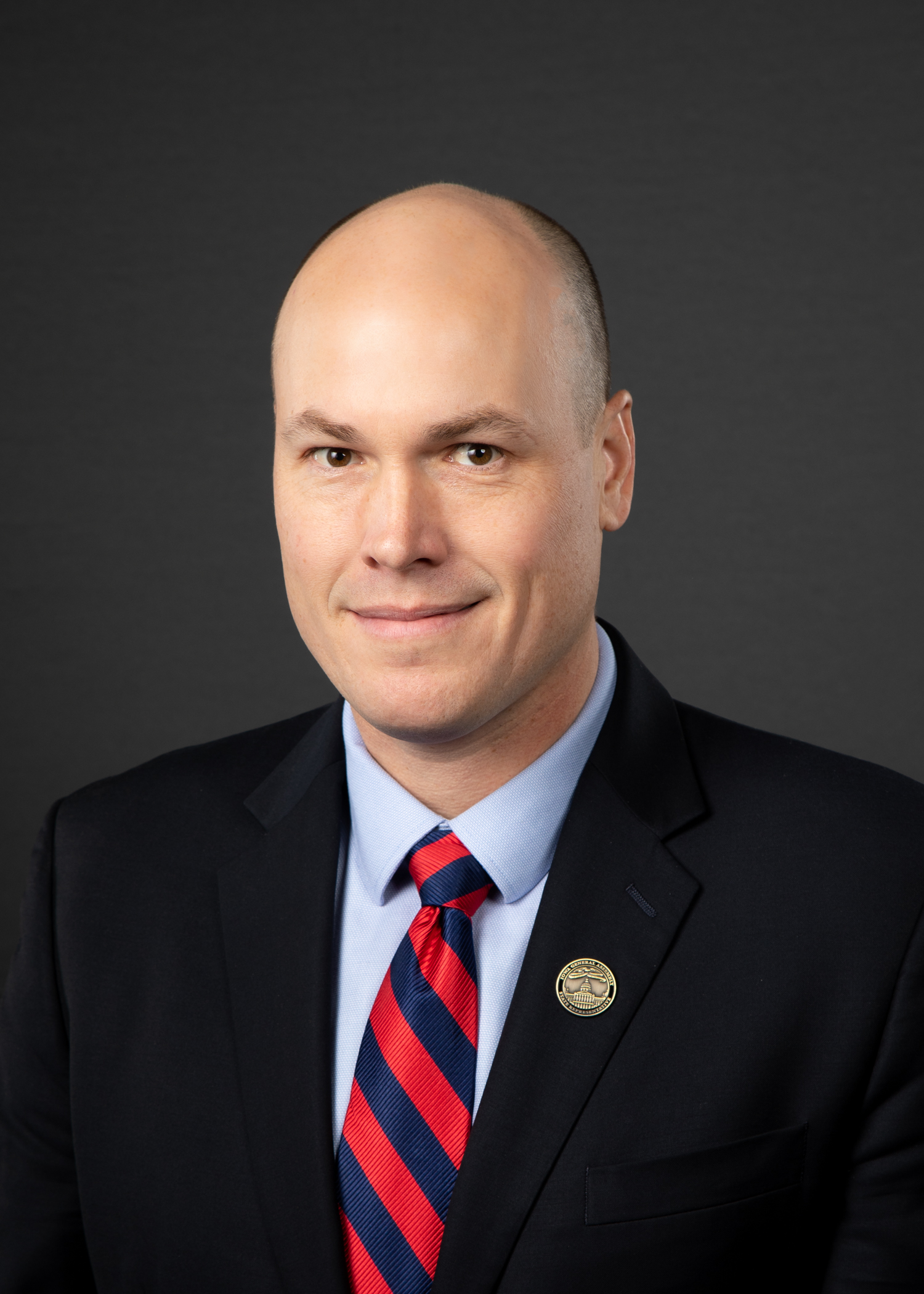
- Official portrait, 2022

Member of the Iowa House of Representatives from the 1st district
- Incumbent
- Assumed office January 9, 2023
- Preceded by: John Wills
- Succeeded by: Shawn Olorundami (elect)

Personal details
- Born: March 4, 1980 (age 46) Ames, Iowa, U.S.
- Party: Democratic
- Education: Morningside University; University of Nebraska–Lincoln (BA)
- Website: Campaign website
- Baseball career
- Pitcher
- Bats: Right Throws: Right

James Dennis Scholten (born March 4, 1980) is an American politician and former professional baseball player. He is a member of the Iowa House of Representatives for District 1. Scholten was the Democratic nominee for Iowa's 4th congressional district in the 2018 and 2020 elections. Scholten did not run for re-election in 2026 and retired from the Iowa House.

== Early life ==
Scholten was born in Ames, Iowa, in 1980. His family moved to Sioux City, Iowa, when he was four years old. He attended East High School in Sioux City, and played for their baseball and basketball teams. Scholten attended Morningside College, where he played college baseball as a pitcher and first baseman for three years, and then transferred to pitch for the Nebraska Cornhuskers as a senior. In 2002, he led the Cornhuskers in earned run average (ERA). Scholten graduated from the University of Nebraska in December 2003.

== Professional baseball career ==
After graduating from college, Scholten played professional baseball, making his professional debut for the Saskatoon Legends of the Canadian Baseball League, an independent baseball league, in 2003. When the league folded during the season, he signed with the Sioux City Explorers of the American Association of Professional Baseball. He returned to Sioux City in 2004, then played in Belgium in 2005 before returning to Sioux City. In total, he played baseball in seven countries—the U.S., Canada, Belgium, Germany, France, the Netherlands, and Cuba.

After retiring from baseball, Scholten became a paralegal. He worked for firms in Minneapolis and Seattle that focused on intellectual property, before returning again to live in Sioux City in 2017.

On July 23, 2023, Scholten returned to professional baseball, signing with the Twins Oosterhout of the Honkbal Hoofdklasse. His arrival came after the club required an additional pitcher following injuries and issues with a Japanese player's visa. In six games (three starts), Scholten had a 2–1 record and 4.50 ERA with 31 strikeouts across 26 innings pitched.

On July 6, 2024, Scholten was the starting pitcher, throwing over six innings for the Sioux City Explorers after receiving a last-minute phone call from the team's manager. The team won 11–2 against the Milwaukee Milkmen as he threw 100 pitches. He signed with the Explorers the following day. In 11 starts for Sioux City, Scholten had a 6–2 record and 5.40 ERA with 29 strikeouts over 60 innings pitched. On April 26, 2025, Scholten re-signed with the Explorers. He went 1–1 in eight games, becoming the oldest player in American Association history to win a game and the only elected official to concurrently play professional baseball. The National Baseball Hall of Fame requested and received a game-worn jersey from Scholten. After the season, he announced that he was retiring from professional baseball.

== Political career ==
=== 2018 U.S. House campaign ===
In the 2018 elections, Scholten ran against controversial Republican incumbent Steve King for the United States House of Representatives in Iowa's 4th congressional district. He lost, 50% to 47% in a closer showing than expected. In January 2019, Scholten announced the formation of a nonprofit group to help low-income Iowans learn more about the earned income tax credit.

=== 2020 U.S. House campaign ===
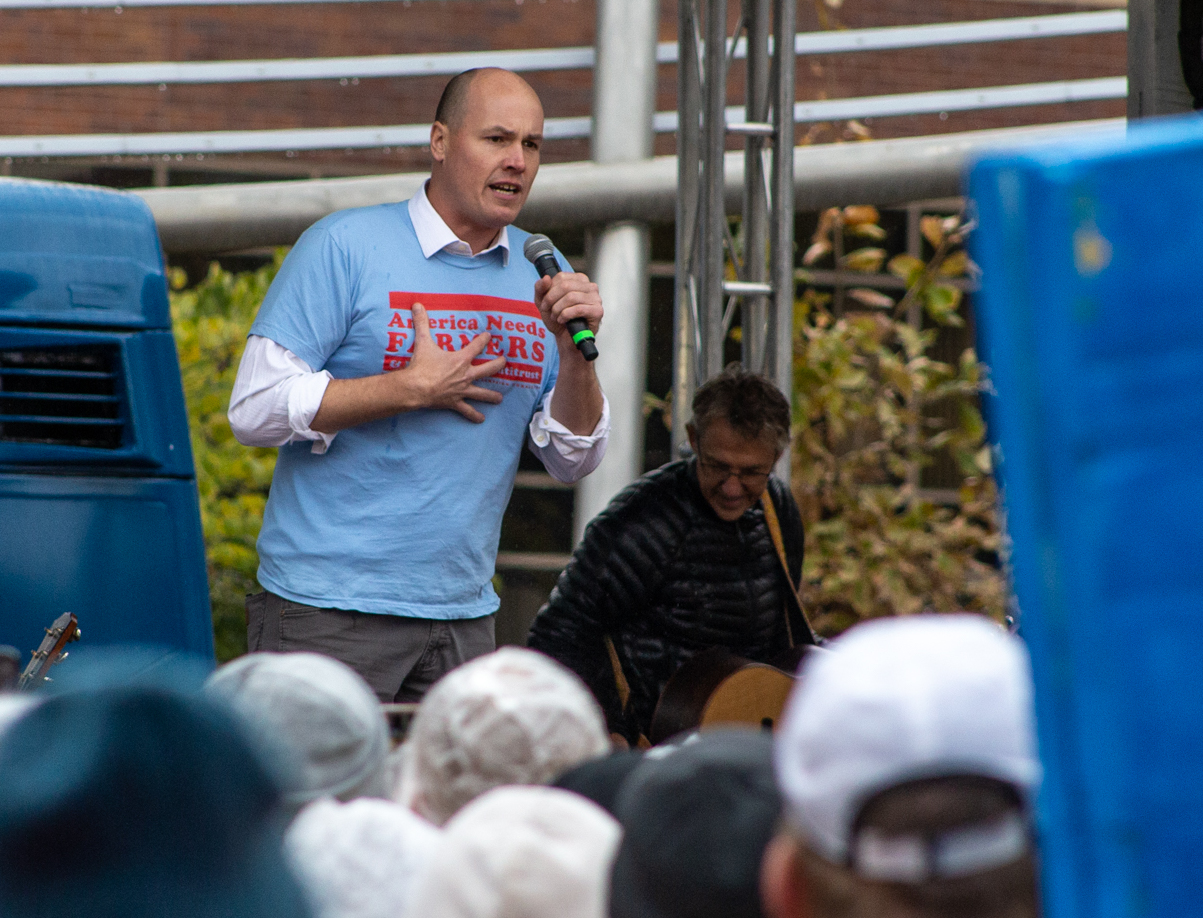
Scholten at a Pete Buttigieg rally in November 2019

In August 2019, Scholten announced that he would seek a rematch against King in the 2020 elections. He was unopposed in the primary election and faced state senator Randy Feenstra, who had defeated King in the Republican primary. Scholten lost to Feenstra by a 25-point margin.

=== Iowa House of Representatives ===
On March 16, 2022, Scholten announced his candidacy for District 1 in the Iowa House of Representatives. He was unopposed in the Democratic primary and the general election.

In 2023, while serving in the Iowa House of Representatives, Scholten signed with the Twins Oosterhout in the Honkbal Hoofdklasse. He continued to work as a legislator remotely. Scholten ran for reelection in the 2024 elections, and won his second term.

In 2026, Scholten announced that he would be retiring from the Iowa House at the end of the 2026 Legislative Session and will not seek re-election.

==== Committee assignments ====
Scholten serves on the following committees in the General Assembly:

- Agriculture (ranking member)
- Economic Growth and Technology
- Natural Resources
- Transportation

=== 2026 U.S. Senate campaign ===
On June 2, 2025, Scholten announced that he would run in the 2026 United States Senate election in Iowa, challenging incumbent Senator Joni Ernst.

On August 18, 2025, Scholten announced that he was dropping out of the race and endorsed fellow state representative Josh Turek.

== Political views ==
Scholten has called himself a "Lina Khan Democrat". He has been described as a progressive and has been characterized as a member of the populist wing of the Democratic Party.

== Personal life ==
Scholten's father was Morningside University's baseball coach.
