= Ryan Weldon =

American politician

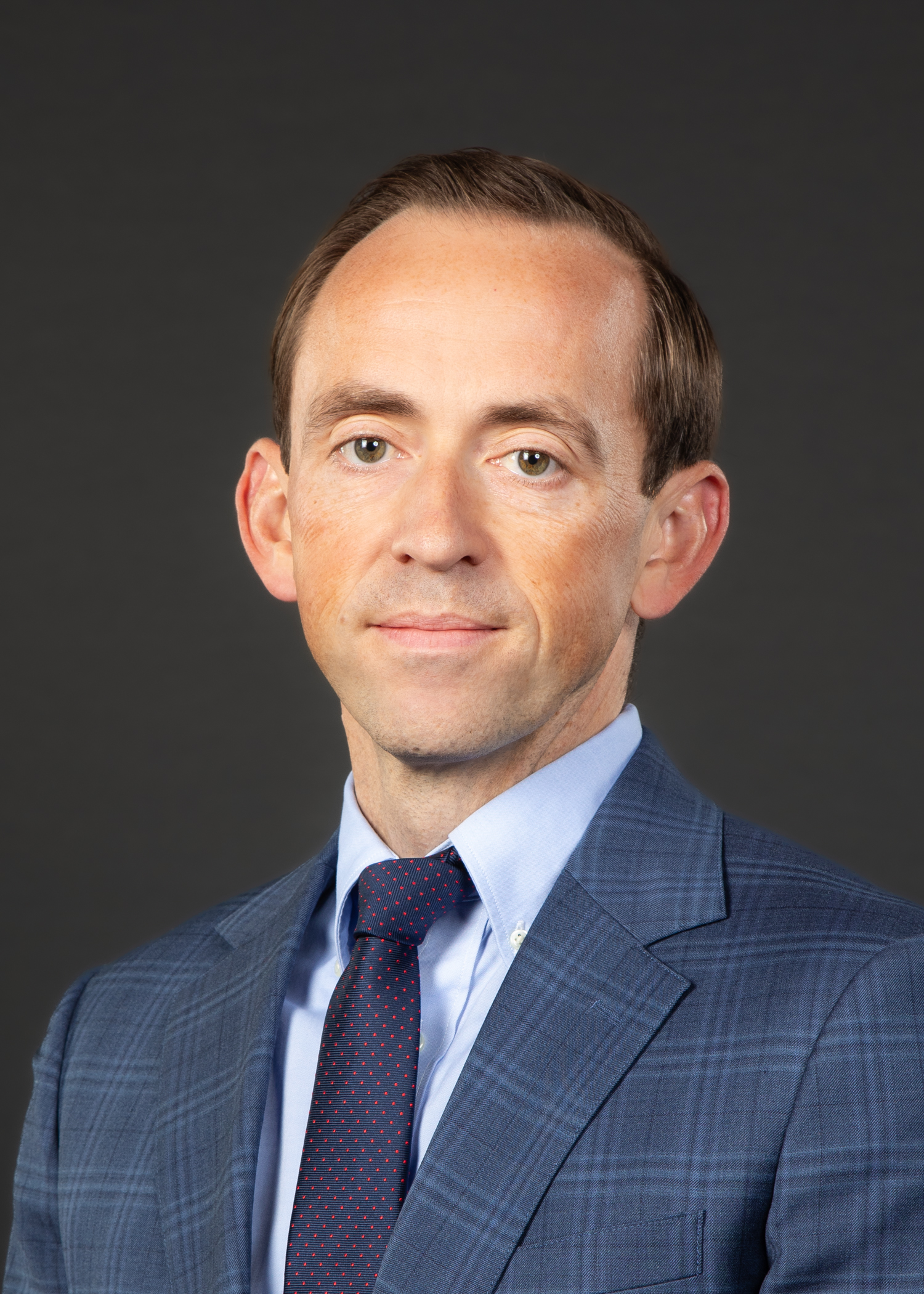

Member of the Iowa House of Representatives from the 41st district
- Incumbent
- Assumed office January 13, 2025
- Preceded by: Molly Buck

Personal details
- Party: Republican
- Website: www.voteryanweldon.com

Ryan Weldon is an American politician. He serves as a Republican member for the 41st district in the Iowa House of Representatives since 2025.

== Career ==
Weldon is a digital business development manager and former Ankeny School Board president. In February 2024, he announced his run for state representative.

Weldon was elected in the 2024 Iowa House of Representatives election, defeating Molly Buck and flipping the seat from the Democratic Party. Weldon is running for re-election in the 2026 Iowa House of Representatives election.

=== Committee assignments ===
- Appropriations (vice chair)
- Economic Growth and Technology
- Health and Human Services
- Labor and Workforce
