= Molly Buck =

American politician

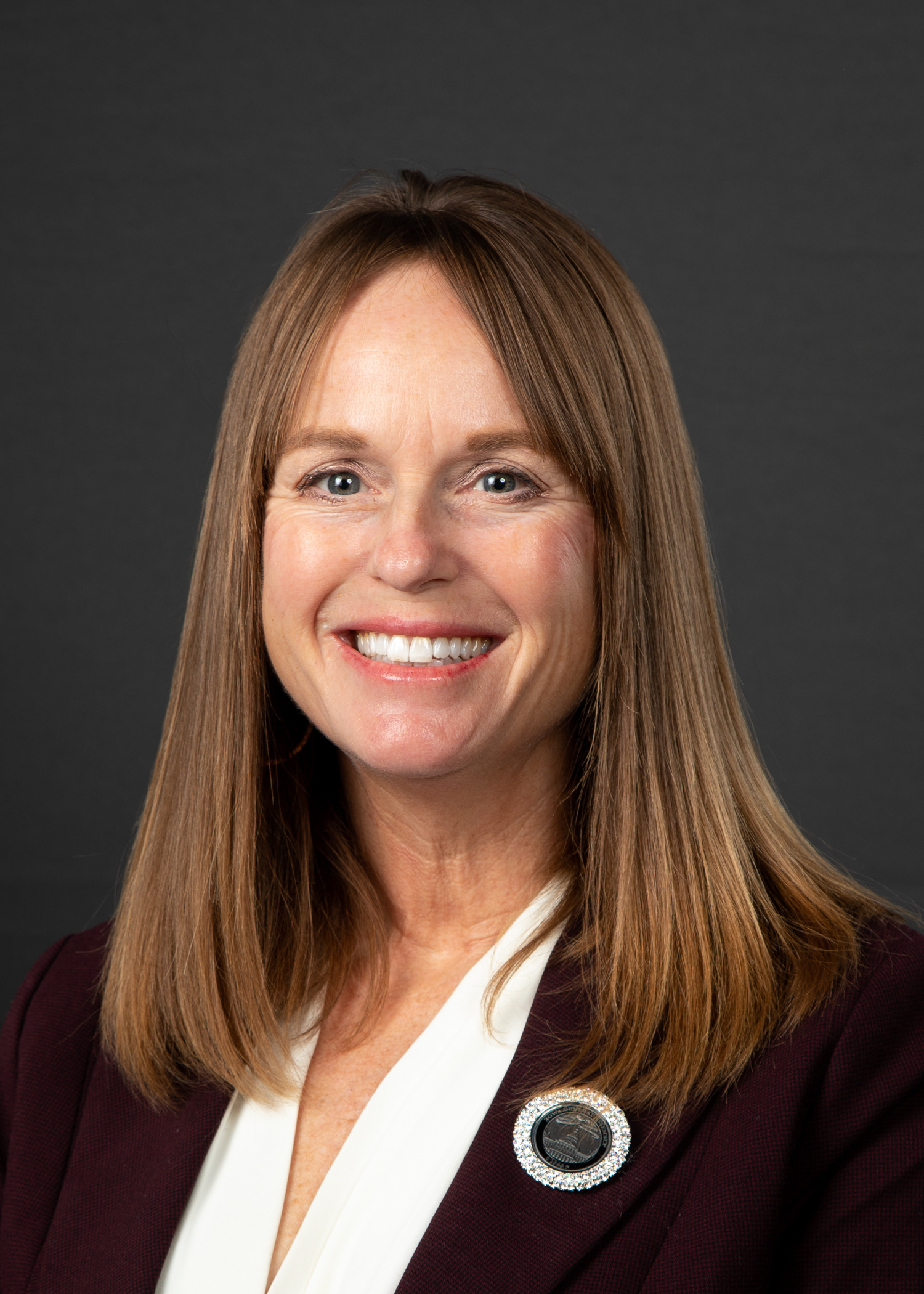

Member of the Iowa House of Representatives from the 41st district
- In office January 9, 2023 – January 13, 2025
- Preceded by: Jo Oldson
- Succeeded by: Ryan Weldon

Personal details
- Party: Democratic
- Education: University of Nebraska & Drake University
- Website: https://www.mollybuckforankeny.com

Molly Buck is an American politician from Ankeny, Iowa.

== Early life and education ==
Buck has a Bachelor of Education degree from the University of Nebraska–Lincoln, and a master's degree in teaching from Drake University.

== Political career ==
Buck's political career started in 2022 when she ran for the 41st Iowa House of Representatives District where she beat her Republican opponent by only 130 votes or .9%.

== Political positions ==
=== Gun laws ===
Buck is in support of stricter gun control laws. She supports more extensive background checks, closing loopholes, and keeping guns away from domestic abusers.

=== Education ===
As a teacher of over 18 years Buck is heavily in support of increased education funding. She wants the state of Iowa to have better teachers and school facilities and also supports affordable child care.

=== Abortion ===
Buck is in support of abortion access throughout the state of Iowa. She has also been advocating for sex education in many school districts long before it became standard in the state. And she supports expanding reproductive and sexual healthcare. She has also been endorsed by Planned Parenthood.

== Electoral history ==
Democratic primary for Iowa House of Representatives District 41, 2022
Party	Candidate	Votes	%
Democratic	Molly Buck	1,674	99.9%
Democratic	Write-in	1	0.1%

General election for Iowa House of Representatives District 41, 2022
Party	Candidate	Votes	%
Democratic	Molly Buck	7,703	50.4%
Republican	Marvis Landon	7,574	49.5%
Other	Write in	13	0.1%
