= Megan Srinivas =

American politician

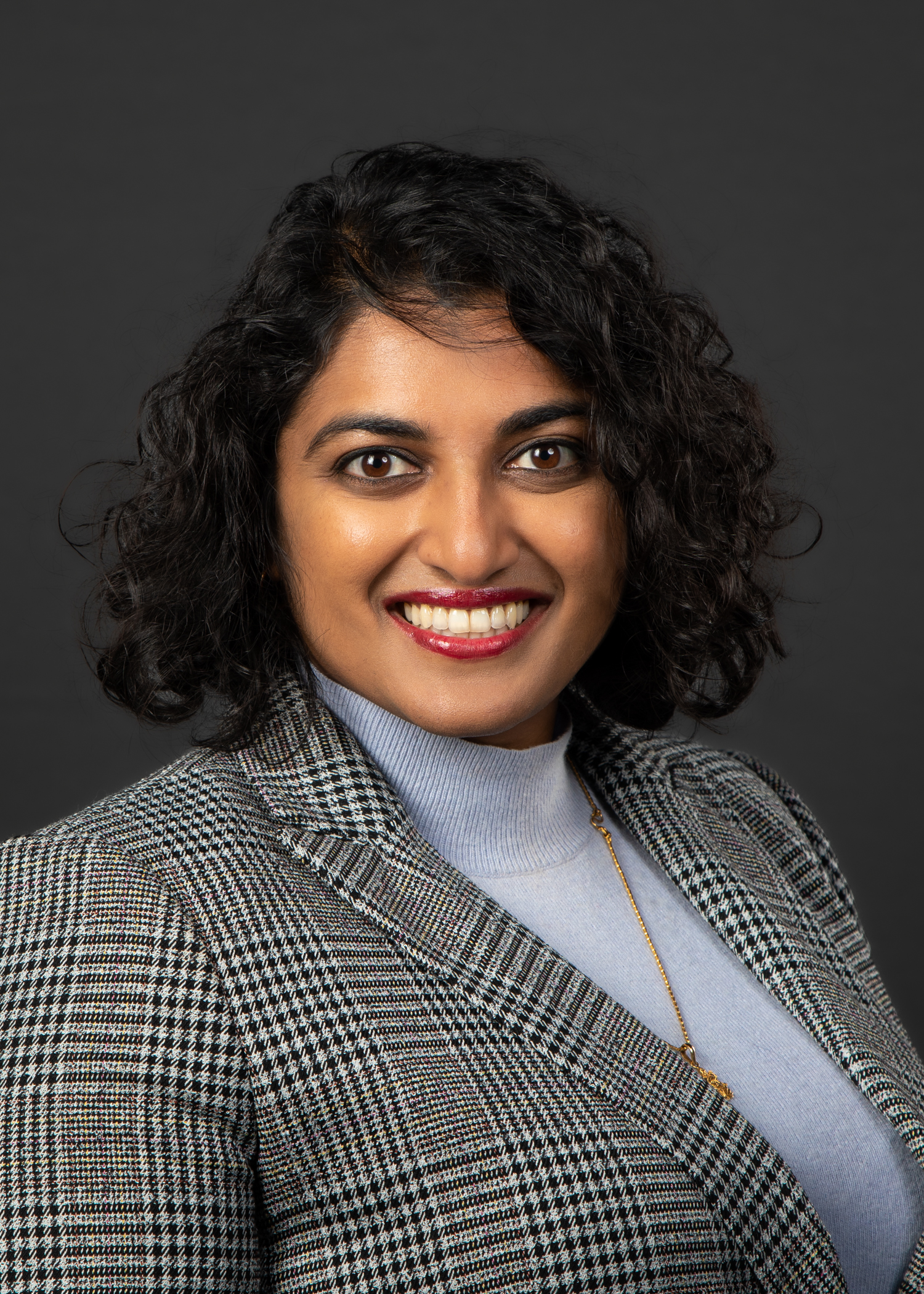

Member of the Iowa House of Representatives from the 30th district
- Incumbent
- Assumed office January 1, 2023
- Preceded by: Brian Lohse

Personal details
- Born: Fort Dodge, Iowa, U.S.
- Party: Democratic
- Education: Harvard University (AB, MPH); University of Iowa (MD)

Dr. Megan Lakshmi Srinivas (/ˈʃrɪniˌvɑːs/ SHRIH-nee-VAHS) is an American politician and physician serving as a Democratic member of the Iowa House of Representatives for the 30th district. Elected in November 2022, she assumed office on January 1, 2023.

== Early life and education ==
Srinivas was born and raised in Fort Dodge, Iowa. After graduating from Fort Dodge Senior High School as her class's valedictorian, she earned a Bachelor of Arts degree in evolutionary biology from Harvard University. Srinivas earned a Doctor of Medicine from the Roy J. and Lucille A. Carver College of Medicine at the University of Iowa and a Master of Public Health from the Harvard T.H. Chan School of Public Health.

== Career ==
Srinivas was appointed to the Iowa Board of Education by Governor Tom Vilsack, making her the first student member in the Board's history. She served from 2003–2005.

Srinivas completed an internal medicine residency at the Johns Hopkins School of Medicine and an infectious disease fellowship at the UNC School of Medicine. After her residency, Srinivas returned to Iowa. She was a part of Project ECHO (Extension for Community Healthcare Outcomes), an initiative that works to connect specialists with primary care providers. During the COVID-19 pandemic in Iowa, Srinivas chaired the Biden administration's COVID Response Council. In March 2026, Srinivas took the role of chief medical officer at Primary Health Care, a nonprofit that aims to broaden healthcare access.

== Political career ==
In 2018, Srinivas first ran for Iowa House of Representatives in her home district of Iowa's 9th District, losing to her Republican opponent, Ann Meyer. In 2022, she ran again, this time for House District 30, and defeated Jerry Cheevers in the general election. Srinivas was reelected for a second term in November of 2024.

=== Committee assignments ===
- Appropriations (ranking member)
- Agriculture
- Commerce
- Judiciary
- State Government
- Fiscal Committee
- Legislative Council

== Personal life ==
As of 2023, Srinivas resides in Des Moines.
