= Brian Lohse =

American politician (born 1968)

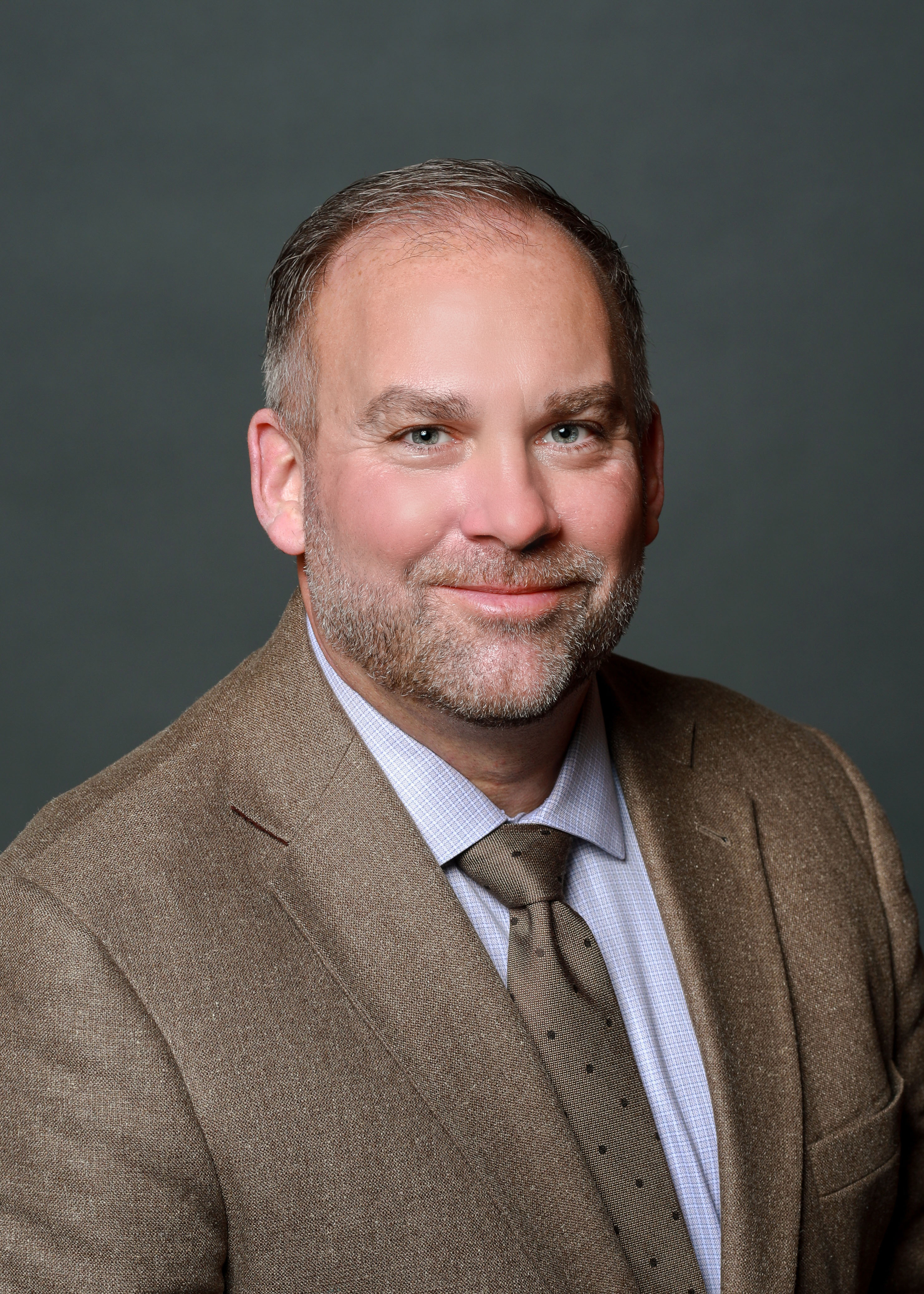
- Lohse in 2021

Member of the Iowa House of Representatives from the 45th district
- Incumbent
- Assumed office January 14, 2019
- Preceded by: Zach Nunn
- Succeeded by: Austin Stubbs (elect)

Personal details
- Born: November 27, 1968 (age 57) Zion, Illinois, U.S.
- Party: Independent
- Spouse: Mary
- Children: 3
- Education: University of Northwestern – St. Paul (BA); Drake University (JD)
- Website: Brian Lohse at the Iowa Legislature

Brian K. Lohse (born 27 November 1968) is an American attorney and politician. An Independent, he was elected to the Iowa House of Representatives in 2018, succeeding Zach Nunn in District 30. Prior to his state legislative service, Lohse sat on the city council of Bondurant, Iowa, for eight years.

== Early life and education ==
Brian Lohse was born in Zion, Illinois and raised in Amboy. After earning a Bachelor of Arts degree in social sciences from the University of Northwestern – St. Paul, Lohse graduated from Drake University Law School in 1995, and joined a legal practice in Lee County, Illinois.

== Career ==
After three years, Lohse returned to Iowa, working as a lawyer for EMC Insurance. In 2004, Lohse also held a second job as a newspaper carrier. In September 2012, Lohse and his wife Mary won an Iowa Powerball lottery jackpot of $202 million, at the time the state's second-largest Powerball jackpot. With the winnings, the couple established the Lohse Family Foundation, funded the construction of a high school football stadium, and opened a grocery store in their hometown of Bondurant, Iowa. After winning the lottery, Brian Lohse ended his practice of law. Mary Lohse remained a medical assistant at a Mercy Medical Center-affiliated clinic, though only on a part-time basis. In August 2022, Fareway announced that it would acquire the Brick Street Market and Café from the Lohse family.

=== Politics ===
Brian Lohse served on the Bondurant City Council for eight years before contesting Zach Nunn's open Iowa House of Representatives seat in District 30 as a Republican Party candidate. He faced Democratic Party candidate Kent Balduchi in the November 2018 general election. Lohse announced in December 2019 that he would run for reelection in 2020. He defeated Lori Slings in the general election. In the 2022 general election, Lohse ran unopposed for District 45. In 2024, Lohse won a second term in District 45, defeating Anthony W. Thompson. Lohse was defeated in the June 2026 Republican primary by Austin Stubbs. Lohse subsequently announced on Facebook that he would be stepping away from politics and disaffiliating with the Republican Party.

== Personal life ==
Lohse and his wife, Mary, have two sons and one daughter.

Iowa House of Representatives
Preceded by Beth Wessel-Kroeschell	45th District; 2023 – present	Succeeded by Incumbent
Preceded by Zach Nunn	30th District; 2019 – 2023	Succeeded by Megan Srinivas
