= Iowa's 86th House of Representatives district =

American legislative district

House District 86
- Type: District of the Lower house
- Location: Iowa
- Representative: David Jacoby
- Parent organization: Iowa General Assembly

The 86th District of the Iowa House of Representatives in the state of Iowa is part of Johnson County.

== Current elected officials ==
David Jacoby is the representative currently representing the district.

== Past representatives ==
The district has previously been represented by:

- Marion D. Siglin, 1971–1973
- John Clark, 1973–1983
- Gary Sherzan, 1983–1993
- Dick Weidman, 1993–2003
- Cindy Winckler, 2003–2013
- Mary Mascher, 2013–2022
- David Jacoby, 2023-Present
