= Iowa's 53rd House of Representatives district =

American legislative district

House District 53
- Type: District of the Lower house
- Location: Iowa
- Representative: Dean Fisher
- Parent organization: Iowa General Assembly

The 53rd District of the Iowa House of Representatives in the state of Iowa is composed of Poweshiek County and part of Tama County.

== Current elected officials ==
Dean Fisher is the representative currently representing the district.

== Past representatives ==
The district has previously been represented by:

- Alfred Nielsen, 1971–1973
- Frank A. Crabb, 1973–1983
- Janet A. Carl, 1983–1987
- Phillip E. Tyrrell, 1987–1993
- Philip Brammer, 1993–1997
- Kay Halloran, 1997–1999
- Dick Taylor, 1999–2003
- Dan Huseman, 2003–2013
- Sharon Steckman, 2013–2023
- Dean Fisher, 2023–Present
