= Beth Wessel-Kroeschell =

American politician

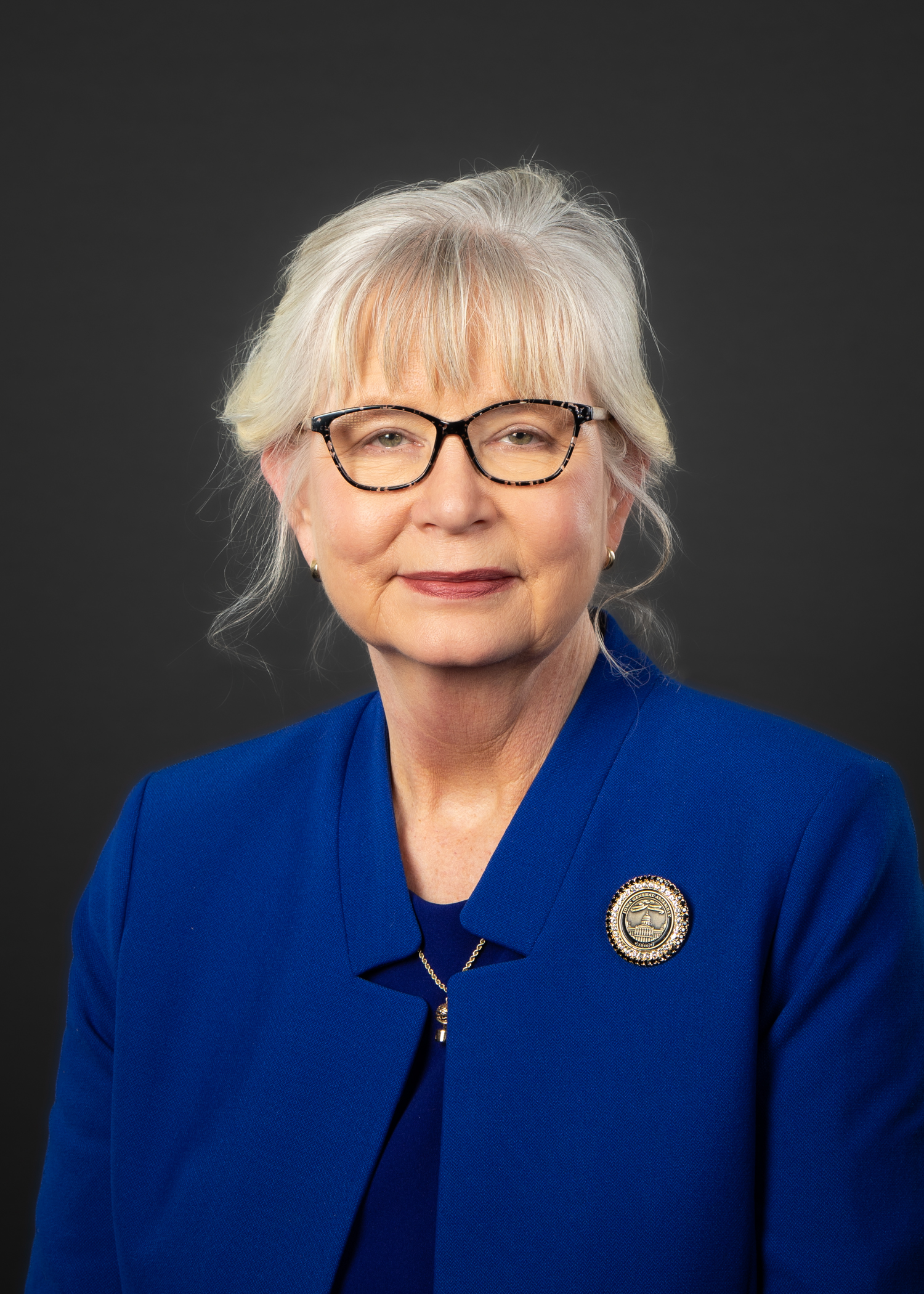

Member of the Iowa House of Representatives from the 49th district
- Incumbent
- Assumed office January 10, 2005
- Preceded by: Jane Greimann

Personal details
- Born: 1959 (age 66–67) Ames, Iowa, U.S.
- Party: Democratic
- Website: legis.iowa.gov/...

Beth Wessel-Kroeschell (born 1959) is an American politician. She has been a Democratic member for the Iowa House of Representatives since 2005.

Wessel-Kroeschell was born and raised in Ames, Iowa and earned a bachelor’s degree from the University of Northern Iowa and a master’s in public administration from Iowa State University. She worked as a desktop publisher, public school teacher, nonprofit administrator, and legislative assistant to state representatives Ralph Rosenberg and Bill Bernau. She later worked as the public events coordinator for Reiman Gardens and lectured in Iowa State University’s political science department.

Wessel-Kroeschell was first elected to represent District 45 for the state house in 2005. During the 2022 state legislative elections, she was redistricted to District 49.

As of January 2025, Wessel-Kroeschell serves on several committees in the Iowa House – the Public Safety, Ways & Means, and Judiciary committees, as well as the Health & Human Services committee, where she is the ranking member. She is also a member of the Justice System Appropriations Subcommittee and of the Medical Assistance Projections and Assessment Council.

== Electoral history ==
*incumbent

Election	Political result	Candidate	Party	Votes	%
Iowa House of Representatives primary elections, 2004; District 45; Turnout: 673	Democratic	Beth Wessel-Kroeschell	Democratic	418	62.1
Iowa House of Representatives primary elections, 2004; District 45; Turnout: 673	Democratic	Tara Van Brederode	Democratic	217	32.2
Iowa House of Representatives primary elections, 2004; District 45; Turnout: 673	Democratic	Leonard V. Larsen	Democratic	30	4.5
Iowa House of Representatives primary elections, 2004; District 45; Turnout: 673	Democratic	Shawn Carter	Democratic	8	1.2
Iowa House of Representatives elections, 2004; District 45; Turnout: 14,005	Democratic hold	Beth Wessel-Kroeschell	Democratic	7,864	56.2
Iowa House of Representatives elections, 2004; District 45; Turnout: 14,005	Democratic hold	Randy R. Woodbury	Republican	5,366	38.3
Iowa House of Representatives elections, 2004; District 45; Turnout: 14,005	Democratic hold	Jerry Litzel	Independent	749	5.3
Iowa House of Representatives elections, 2006; District 45	Democratic hold	Beth Wessel-Kroeschell*	Democratic	unopposed	
Iowa House of Representatives elections, 2008; District 45; Turnout: 14,808	Democratic hold	Beth Wessel-Kroeschell*	Democratic	8,589	58.0
Iowa House of Representatives elections, 2008; District 45; Turnout: 14,808	Democratic hold	Ryan Rhodes	Republican	6,168	41.7
Iowa House of Representatives elections, 2010; District 45; Turnout: 8,314	Democratic hold	Beth Wessel-Kroeschell*	Democratic	4,396	52.9
Iowa House of Representatives elections, 2010; District 45; Turnout: 8,314	Democratic hold	Karin Sevde	Republican	3,389	40.8

Iowa House of Representatives
Preceded by Dave Deyoe	49th District; 2023–Present	Succeeded by Incumbent
Preceded by Jane Greimann	45th District; 2005–2023	Succeeded by Brian Lohse
