= Iowa's 1st House of Representatives district =

American legislative district

House District 1
- Type: District of the Lower house
- Location: Iowa
- Representative: J. D. Scholten
- Parent organization: Iowa General Assembly

The 1st District of the Iowa House of Representatives in the state of Iowa. It is currently composed of part of Woodbury County.

== Current elected officials ==
J. D. Scholten is the representative currently representing the district.

== Past representatives ==
The district has previously been represented by:

- Elmer Den Herder, 1971–1978
- Kenneth De Groot, 1979–1983
- James D. O'Kane, 1983–1987
- Steven D. Hansen, 1987–1995
- Ronald Nutt, 1995–1997
- Wes Whitead, 1997–2001
- Gregory Hoversten, 2001–2003
- Wes Whitead, 2003–2011
- Jeremy Taylor, 2011–2013
- Jeff Smith, 2013–2015
- John Wills, 2015–2023
- J. D. Scholten, 2023–2027
- Shawn Olorundami, 2027
