= Iowa's 30th House of Representatives district =

American legislative district

House District 30
- Type: District of the Lower house
- Location: Iowa
- Representative: Megan Srinivas
- Parent organization: Iowa General Assembly

The 30th District of the Iowa House of Representatives is located in the eastern portion of Polk County in the state of Iowa.

== Current elected officials ==
Megan Srinivas is the representative currently representing the district.

== Past representatives ==
The district has previously been represented by:

- Darwin V. Mayberry, 1971–1973
- James D. Jordan, 1973–1977
- Myron B. Oxley, 1977–1983
- Deo A. Koenigs, 1983–1993
- Keith Weigel, 1993–2001
- Brian Quirk, 2001–2003
- Richard E. Myers, 2003–2003
- David Jacoby, 2003–2013
- Joe Riding, 2013–2015
- Zach Nunn, 2015–2019
- Brian Lohse, 2019–2023
- Megan Srinivas, 2023–present
