= John Wills (politician) =

American politician

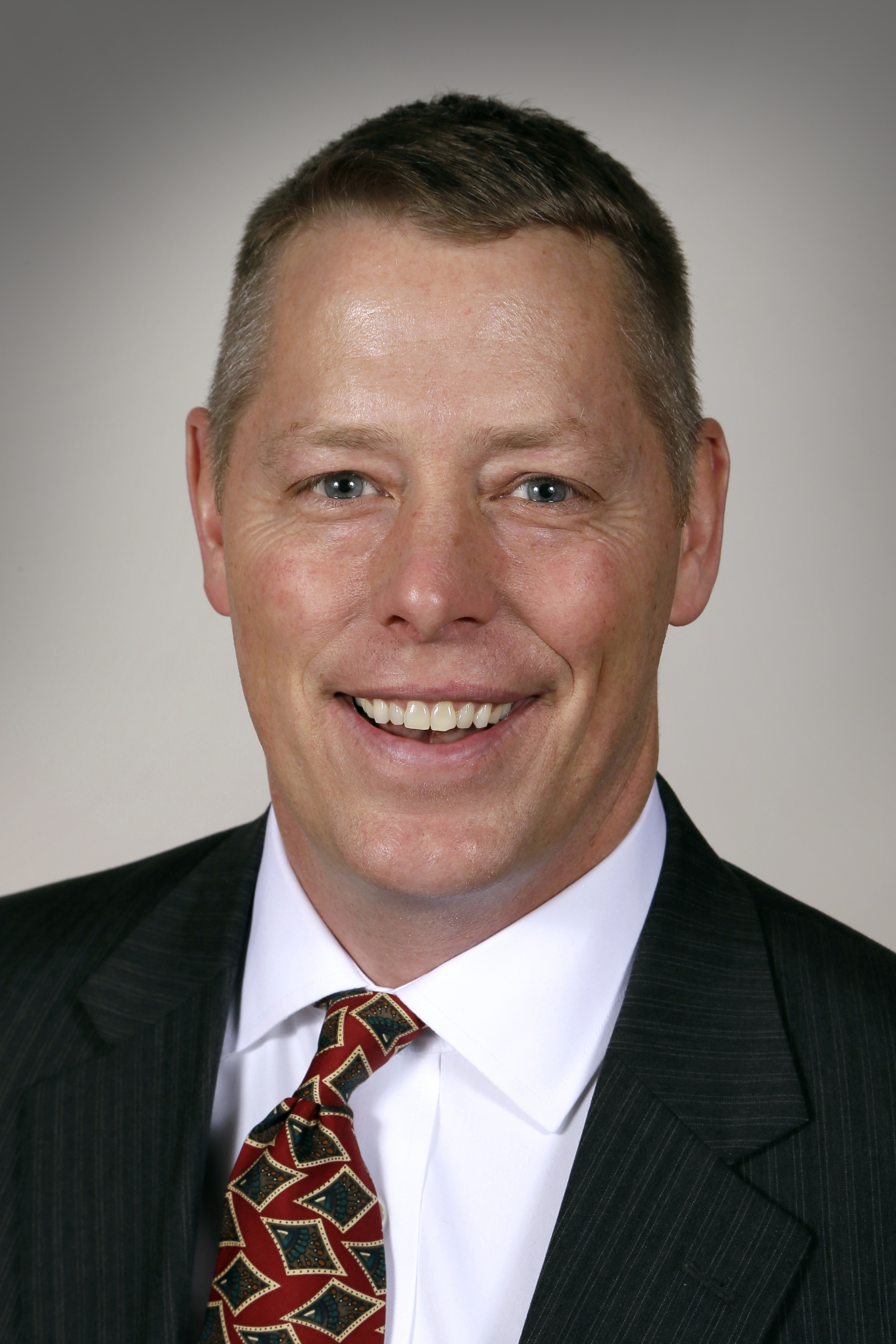

Speaker pro tempore of the Iowa House of Representatives
- Incumbent
- Assumed office January 13, 2020
- Preceded by: Matt Windschitl

Member of the Iowa House of Representatives
- Incumbent
- Assumed office January 12, 2015
- Preceded by: Jeff Smith
- Constituency: 1st district (2015–2023); 10th district (2023–present)

Personal details
- Born: February 18, 1966 (age 60) Sibley, Iowa, U.S.
- Party: Republican
- Education: Northwestern College (BS); American Public University (MA, MS)

Military service
- Allegiance: United States
- Branch/service: United States Army
- Unit: Army National Guard

John H. Wills (born February 18, 1966) is an American politician serving as speaker pro tempore as a member of the Iowa House of Representatives from the 10th district. Elected in November 2014, Wills assumed office on January 12, 2015.

== Early life and education ==
Wills was born and raised in Sibley, Iowa. He earned a Bachelor of Science degree in biology from Northwestern College and two master's degrees from American Military University.

== Career ==
As of January 2015, Wills serves on the Human Resources, Natural Resources, and State Government committees, as well as the Agriculture and Natural Resources Appropriations Subcommittee. He also serves as the vice chair of the Environmental Protection Committee.

Wills is a founding member of Pheasants Forever in Osceola County and a member of the State Pheasants Forever Council. He is also a member of the Friends of Lakeside Lab and Veterans of Foreign War.

Wills is a former vice president of the Okoboji Protective Association and has been involved in water quality and conservation organizations for more than 15 years. Wills has served in the military for 25 years, including in the Army National Guard.

Iowa House of Representatives
Preceded by Matt Windschitl	Speaker pro tempore of the Iowa House of Representatives; 2020–present	Incumbent
