= Iowa's 45th House of Representatives district =

American legislative district

House District 45
- Type: District of the Lower house
- Location: Iowa
- Representative: Brian Lohse
- Parent organization: Iowa General Assembly

The 45th District of the Iowa House of Representatives in the state of Iowa. It is currently composed of part of Polk County.

== Current elected officials ==
Brian Lohse is the representative currently representing the district.

== Past representatives ==
The district has previously been represented by:

- Ivor W. Stanley, 1971–1973
- Dale M. Cochran, 1973–1983
- Minnette Doderer, 1983–2001
- Vicki Lensing, 2001–2003
- Jane Greimann, 2003–2005
- Beth Wessel-Kroeschell, 2005–2023
- Brian Lohse, 2023-2027
- Austin Stubbs, 2027-present
