= Iowa's 98th House of Representatives district =

American legislative district

House District 98
- Type: District of the Lower house
- Location: Iowa
- Representative: Monica Kurth
- Parent organization: Iowa General Assembly

The 98th District of the Iowa House of Representatives in the state of Iowa is part of Scott County.

== Current elected officials ==
Monica Kurth is the representative currently representing the district.

== Past representatives ==
The district has previously been represented by:

- Dewey Goode, 1971–1973
- Laverne Schroeder, 1973–1985
- Joan Hester, 1985–1993
- Philip Wise, 1993–2003
- Gerald D. Jones, 2003–2007
- Greg Forristall, 2007–2013
- Mary Wolfe, 2013–2023
- Monica Kurth, 2023–2027
