= Iowa's 49th House of Representatives district =

American legislative district

House District 49
- Type: District of the Lower house
- Location: Iowa
- Representative: Beth Wessel-Kroeschell
- Parent organization: Iowa General Assembly

The 49th District of the Iowa House of Representatives in the state of Iowa is part of Story County.

== Representatives ==
The district has previously been represented by:

- Nicholas Balkema, 1909–1921
- Mike Blouin, 1971–1973
- Albert H. Fullerton, 1973–1976
- Donald H. Binneboese, 1976–1983
- Kathleen Halloran Chapman, 1983–1993
- Robert Dvorsky, 1993–1994
- Richard E. Myers, 1994–2003
- Helen Miller, 2003–2013
- Dave Deyoe, 2013–2023
- Beth Wessel-Kroeschell, 2023-
