= Iowa House of Representatives =

Lower house of the Iowa General Assembly

Coordinates: 41.591°N 93.604°W

- Iowa General Assembly

Type
- Type: Lower house
- Term limits: None

History
- New session started: January 13, 2025

Leadership
- Speaker: Pat Grassley (R) since January 13, 2020
- Speaker pro tempore: John Wills (R) since January 13, 2020
- Majority Leader: Bobby Kaufmann (R) since August 4, 2025
- Minority Leader: Brian Meyer (D) since May 15, 2025

Structure
- Seats: 100
- Political groups: Majority: Republican (67); Minority: Democratic (33)
- Length of term: 2 years
- Authority: Legislative Department, Section 3, Iowa Constitution
- Salary: $25,000/year + per diem

Elections
- Last election: November 5, 2024
- Next election: November 3, 2026
- Redistricting: Legislative Service Agency with legislative approval

Meeting place
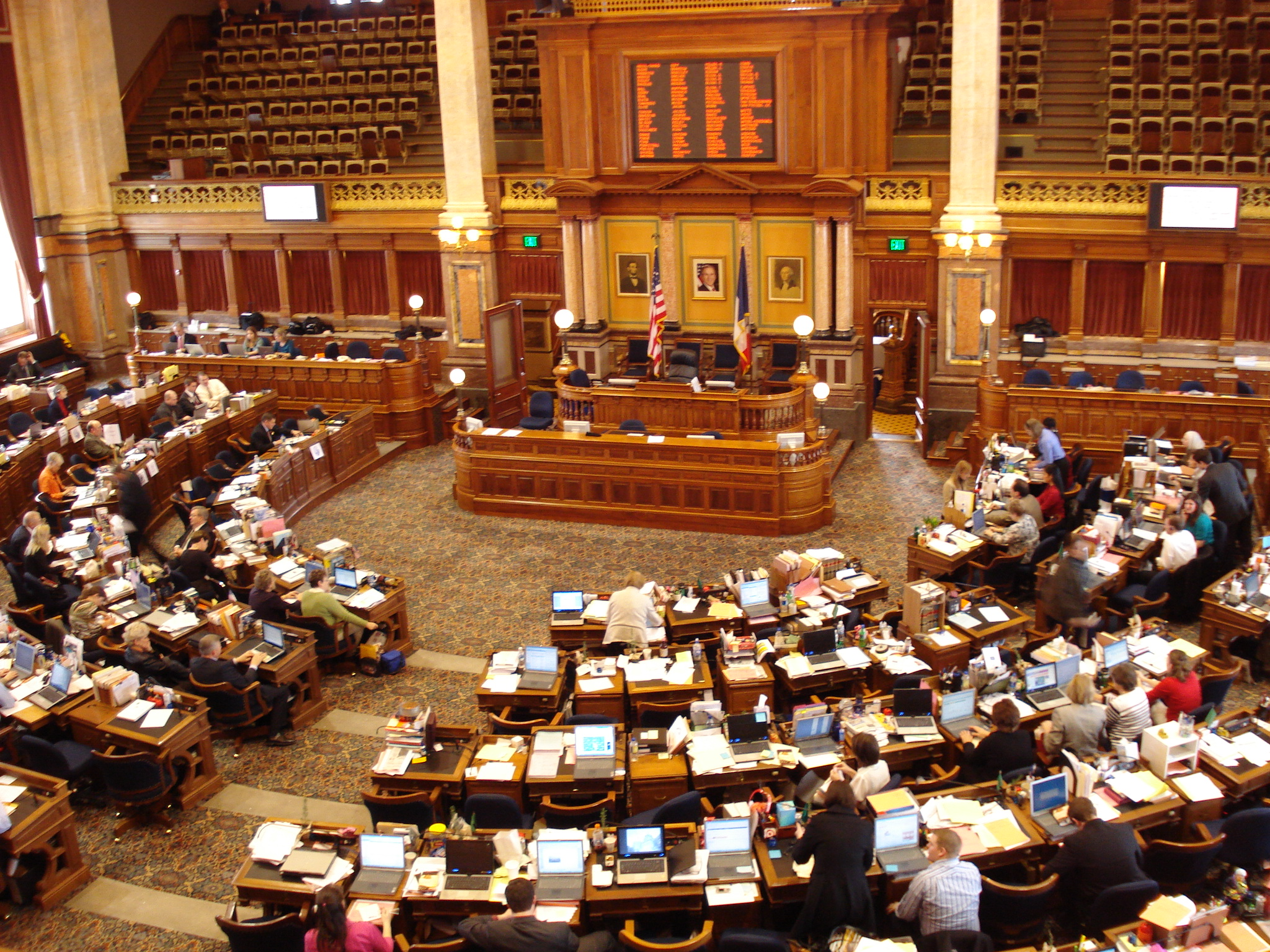
- House of Representatives Chamber; Iowa State Capitol; Des Moines, Iowa

Website
- Iowa General Assembly

Rules
- 90th General Assembly House Rules

The Iowa House of Representatives is the lower house of the Iowa General Assembly, the upper house being the Iowa Senate. There are 100 seats in the Iowa House of Representatives, representing 100 single-member districts across the state, formed by dividing the 50 Senate districts in half. Each district has a population of approximately 30,464 as of the 2010 United States census. The House of Representatives meets at the Iowa State Capitol in Des Moines.

Unlike the upper house, the Iowa Senate, state House representatives serve two-year terms with the whole chamber up for re-election in even-numbered years. There are no term limits for the House.

The current list of Representatives encompasses the 91st General Assembly for the Iowa legislature.

== Leadership of the House ==
The Speaker of the House presides over the House as its chief leadership officer, controlling the flow of legislation and committee assignments. The Speaker is elected by the majority party caucus, followed by confirmation of the full House on passage of a floor vote. Other House leaders, such as the majority and minority leaders, are elected by their respective party caucuses according to each party's strength in the chamber.

=== Leaders ===
As of August 4, 2025

Position	Name	Party	District
Speaker of the House	Pat Grassley	Republican	57
Majority Leader	Bobby Kaufmann	Republican	82
Majority Whip	Henry Stone	Republican	9
Minority Leader	Brian Meyer	Democratic	29
Minority Whip	Sean Bagniewski	Democratic	35

== Committee leadership ==
All chairs and vice chairs are a member of the majority party, with the chair serving as the presiding officer and the vice chair the alternate presiding officer. Ranking members are the chief representative of the minority party on the committee.

Committee	Chair	Vice Chair	Ranking Member
Administration & Rules	Brent Siegrist	Jon Dunwell	Brian Meyer
Agriculture	Derek Wulf	Chad Behn	J.D. Scholten
Appropriations	Gary Mohr	Ryan Weldon	Megan Srinivas
Commerce	David Young	David Blom	Kenan Judge
Economic Growth & Technology	Ray Sorensen	Devon Wood	Aime Wichtendahl
Education	Skyler Wheeler	Samantha Fett	Tracy Ehlert
Environmental Protection	Dean Fisher	Thomas Gerhold	Mary Lee Madison
Ethics	Bill Gustoff	Craig Johnson	Ruth Ann Gaines
Government Oversight	Charley Thomson	Jeff Shipley	Larry McBurney
Health and Human Services	Austin Harris	Brett Barker	Beth Wessel-Kroeschell
Higher Education	Taylor Collins	Jeff Shipley	Timi Brown-Powers
Judiciary	Steven Holt	Judd Lawler	Ross Wilburn
Labor & Workforce	Barb Kniff McCulla	Joshua Meggers	Jeff Cooling
Local Government	Brooke Boden	Craig Williams	Adam Zabner
Natural Resources	Devon Wood	Cindy Golding	Elinor Levin
Public Safety	Mike Vondran	Sam Wengryn	Eric Gjerde
State Government	Jane Bloomingdale	Jennifer J. Smith	Amy Nielsen
Transportation	Megan Jones	Brent Siegrist	Daniel Gosa
Veterans Affairs	Tom Determann	Jason Gearhart	Jerome Amos Jr.
Ways and Means	Carter Nordman	Christian Hermanson	David Jacoby

*All chairs and vice chairs are members of the Republican Party of Iowa. All ranking members are members of the Democratic Party of Iowa.

== Vacancies ==
There are no current vacancies. Previously, Mike Sexton resigned to accept a federal appointment to be the Director of Iowa's Rural Development on September 19, 2025. On September 24, Governor Kim Reynolds announced a special election to replace Sexton set for December 9, 2025. The special election was won by Wendy Larson.

Representative Martin Graber unexpectedly died on January 31, 2025. His seat in District 100 was briefly vacant until a special election was won by Blaine Watkins on March 11, 2025.

== Current composition ==
Iowa House districts from 2012 to 2022

Affiliation	Party (Shading indicates majority caucus)		Total	Vacant
Affiliation	Republican	Democratic	Total	Vacant
End of previous legislature	57	43	100	0
Begin 2017	59	41	100	0
End 2018	58	41	100	0
Begin 2019	54	46	100	0
End 2020	53	47	100	0
Begin 2021	58	41	99	1
End 2022	60	40	100	0
2023–2024	64	36	100	0
Begin 2025	67	33	100	0
January 31, 2025	66	33	99	1
March 11, 2025	67	33	100	0
April 1, 2025	67	32	99	1
April 29, 2025	67	33	100	0
September 19, 2025	66	33	99	1
December 9, 2025	67	33	100	0
October 5, 2026	66	33	99	1
Latest voting share	67%	33%		

== State representatives ==
District	Area(s)	Residence	Name		Party	Start	Standing committee leader	Appropriations subcommittee member
1	Woodbury	Sioux City		J. D. Scholten	Democratic	2022		Economic Development
2	Woodbury	Sioux City		Robert Henderson	Republican	2022		Education (vice chair)
3	Plymouth and Sioux	Le Mars		Thomas Jeneary	Republican	2018	Natural Resources (chair)	Health and Human Resources
4	Lyon and Sioux	Hull		Skyler Wheeler	Republican	2016	Education (chair)	Education
5	Buena Vista, Cherokee, O'Brien and Osceola	Granville		Zach Dieken	Republican	2022	Environmental Protection (vice chair)	
6	Clay and Buena Vista	Sioux Rapids	Official Portrait for the 85th General Assembly	Megan Jones	Republican	2012		
7	Calhoun, Pocahontas, Sac and Webster	Odebolt		Wendy Larson	Republican	2025 (Note: Originally elected in a special election.)		
8	Webster	Fort Dodge		Ann Meyer	Republican	2018	Health and Human Services (chair)	Health and Human Services
9	Emmet, Kossuth and Winnebago	Forest City		Henry Stone	Republican	2020		Economic Development
10	Clay, Dickinson, Kossuth, and Palo Alto	Ankeny		John Wills	Republican	2014		
11	Audubon, Carroll, Shelby and Pottawattamie	Manning		Craig Williams	Republican	2024	Local Government (vice chair)	Agriculture and Natural Resources
12	Crawford, Ida, and Shelby	Denison		Steven Holt	Republican	2014	Judiciary (chair)	
13	Cherokee, Monona, Plymouth and Woodbury	Kingsley		Travis Sitzmann	Republican	2024		Administration and Regulation
14	Woodbury	Sioux City		Jacob Bossman	Republican	2018		Transportation, Infrastructure, and Capitals (chair)
15	Harrison, and Pottawattamie	Missouri Valley	Official Portrait for the 85th General Assembly	Matt Windschitl	Republican	2006		
16	Fremont, Mills, and Pottawattamie	Glenwood	Official Portrait for the 86th General Assembly	David Sieck	Republican	2015	Economic Growth and Technology (vice chair)	
17	Adams, Page, Ringgold, Taylor and Union	New Market		Devon Wood	Republican	2022	Health and Human Services (vice chair)	Transportation, Infrastructure, and Capitals
18	Cass, Montgomery, and Page	Griswold	Official Portrait for the 89th General Assembly	Tom Moore	Republican	2015	Labor and Workforce (vice chair)	
19	Pottawattamie	Council Bluffs	Official Portrait for the 85th General Assembly	Brent Siegrist	Republican	2020	Administration and Rules (chair)	Education
20	Pottawattamie	Council Bluffs		Josh Turek	Democratic	2022	Veterans Affairs (Ranking Member)	Health and Human Services
21	Marion and Warren	Indianola		Brooke Boden	Republican	2020	Government Oversight (chair)	Economic Development
22	Warren	Carlisle		Samantha Fett	Republican	2024	Education (vice chair)	Education
23	Adair, Clarke, Dallas, Madison, and Union	Greenfield		Ray Sorensen	Republican	2018	Economic Growth and Technology (chair)	
24	Appanoose, Clarke, Decatur, Lucas, and Wayne	Pleasanton		Sam Wengryn	Republican	2024	Public Safety (vice chair)	Economic Development
25	Wapello	Ottumwa		Hans Wilz	Republican	2022		Health and Human Services (vice chair)
26	Appanoose, Davis, Monroe, Wapello	Moulton		Austin Harris	Republican	2022	State Government (vice chair)	Economic Development
27	Dallas	Waukee		Kenan Judge	Democratic	2018	Commerce (Ranking Member)	Transportation, Infrastructure, and Capitals
28	Dallas	Van Meter		David Young	Republican	2022	Commerce (chair)	Administration and Regulation
29	Polk	Des Moines		Brian Meyer	Democratic	2013	Transportation (Ranking Member)	
30	Polk	Des Moines		Megan Srinivas	Democratic	2022		Administration and Regulation
31	Dallas and Polk	West Des Moines		Mary Madison	Democratic	2022		Economic Development
32	Polk	Windsor Heights		Jennifer Konfrst	Democratic	2018	Administration and Rules (Ranking Member); Education Reform (Ranking Member)	
33	Polk	Des Moines	Official Portrait for the 85th General Assembly	Ruth Ann Gaines	Democratic	2010	Ethics (Ranking Member)	
34	Polk	Des Moines		Rob Johnson	Democratic	2024		Economic Development
35	Polk	Des Moines		Sean Bagniewski	Democratic	2022		Agriculture and Natural Resources
36	Polk	Des Moines		Austin Baeth	Democratic	2022	Environmental Protection (Ranking Member)	Agriculture and Natural Resources
37	Jasper, Mahaska and Marion	Pella		Barb McCulla	Republican	2022	Ways and Means (vice chair)	
38	Jasper		Vacant					
39	Polk	Des Moines	Official Portrait for the 85th General Assembly	Rick Olson	Democratic	2004		
40	Polk	Saylor Township		Bill Gustoff	Republican	2022	Judiciary (vice chair)	Administration and Regulation
41	Polk	Ankeny		Ryan Weldon	Republican	2024		Economic Development (vice chair)
42	Polk	Ankeny		Heather Matson	Democratic	2022		Economic Development (Ranking Member)
43	Polk	Johnston		Eddie Andrews	Republican	2020		
44	Polk	Urbandale		Larry McBurney	Democratic	2024		Economic Development
45	Polk	Bondurant		Brian Lohse	Republican	2018		Justice System (chair)
46	Dallas and Polk	Urbandale		Dan Gehlbach	Republican	2022		Transportation, Infrastructure, and Capitals (vice chair)
47	Dallas, Greene and Guthrie	Dallas Center		Carter Nordman	Republican	2020		Education (chair)
48	Boone and Story	Boone		Chad Behn	Republican	2024	Agriculture (vice chair)	Agriculture and Natural Resources
49	Story	Ames	Official Portrait for the 85th General Assembly	Beth Wessel-Kroeschell	Democratic	2004	Health and Human Services (Ranking Member)	Justice System
50	Story	Ames		Ross Wilburn	Democratic	2020	Judiciary (Ranking Member)	Justice System
51	Marshall and Story	Center Point		Brett Barker	Republican	2024	Health and Human Services (vice chair)	Health and Human Services
52	Marshall	Marshalltown		David Blom	Republican	2024	Commerce (vice chair)	Transportation, Infrastructure, and Capitals
53	Poweshiek and Tama	Urbandale	Official Portrait for the 85th General Assembly	Dean Fisher	Republican	2012	Environmental Protection (chair)	
54	Black Hawk, Grundy, and Hardin	Grundy Center		Joshua Meggers	Republican	2022		Administration and Regulation (vice chair)
55	Franklin, Hamilton, Story and Wright	Sheffield		Shannon Latham	Republican	2020	Local Government (chair)	Agriculture and Natural Resources
56	Hancock, Humboldt and Wright	Belmond		Mark Thompson	Republican	2022		
57	Butler and Bremer	New Hartford	Official Portrait for the 85th General Assembly	Pat Grassley	Republican	2006	Education Reform (chair)	
58	Bremer, Chickasaw, and Floyd	Charles City		Charley Thomson	Republican	2022		Economic Development (vice chair)
59	Cerro Gordo	Mason City		Christian Hermanson	Republican	2024	Ways and Means (vice chair)	Transportation, Infrastructure, and Capitals
60	Cerro, Floyd, Mitchell, and Worth	Northwood		Jane Bloomingdale	Republican	2016	State Government (chair)	
61	Black Hawk	Waterloo		Timi Brown-Powers	Democratic	2014	Appropriations (Ranking Member)	
62	Black Hawk	Waterloo		Jerome Amos	Democratic	2022		Economic Development
63	Howard, Fayette, and Winneshiek	Dorchester		Michael Bergan	Republican	2016		Administration and Regulation (chair)
64	Allamakee, Clayton and Dubuque	Strawberry Point		Jason Gearhart	Republican	2024	Veterans Affairs (vice chair)	
65	Dubuque	Peosta		Shannon Lundgren	Republican	2016	Commerce (chair)	Health and Human Services
66	Jackson, and Jones	Cascade		Steve Bradley	Republican	2020		Justice System (vice chair)
67	Buchanan, Delaware and Dubuque	Independence		Craig Johnson	Republican	2022	Education (vice chair)	
68	Back Hawk, Buchanan and Fayette	Randalia		Chad Ingels	Republican	2020	Veterans Affairs (chair)	Agriculture and Natural Resources
69	Clinton	Camanche		Tom Determann	Republican	2022	Transportation (vice chair)	Administration and Regulation
70	Clinton, Jackson and Scott	DeWitt		Norlin Mommsen	Republican	2014		Agriculture and Natural Resources (chair)
71	Dubuque	Dubuque		Lindsay James	Democratic	2018	Government Oversight (Ranking Member)	
72	Dubuque	Dubuque		Jennifer Smith	Republican	2024	State Government (vice chair)	Administration and Regulation
73	Linn	Marion		Elizabeth Wilson	Democratic	2022		Health and Human Services
74	Linn	Cedar Rapids		Eric Gjerde	Democratic	2020		Justice System
75	Black Hawk	Cedar Falls	Official Portrait for the 85th General Assembly	Bob Kressig	Democratic	2004	Public Safety (Ranking Member)	Administration and Regulation
76	Black Hawk, Benton, and Tama	Hudson		Derek Wulf	Republican	2022	Agriculture (vice chair)	Agriculture and Natural Resources
77	Linn	Cedar Rapids		Jeff Cooling	Democratic	2022	Labor and Workforce (Ranking Member)	Transportation, Infrastructure, and Capitals
78	Linn	Cedar Rapids		Angel Ramirez	Democratic	2025		
79	Linn	Cedar Rapids		Tracy Ehlert	Democratic	2018		Education (Ranking Member)
80	Linn	Hiawatha		Aime Wichtendahl	Democratic	2024		Transportation, Infrastructure, and Capitals
81	Scott	Davenport		Daniel Gosa	Democratic	2024		Federal and Other Funds
82	Cedar, Muscatine and Scott	Wilton	Official Portrait for the 85th General Assembly	Bobby Kaufmann	Republican	2012	Ways and Means (chair)	
83	Linn	Cedar Rapids		Cindy Golding	Republican	2022	Local Government (vice chair)	
84	Benton and Linn	Atkins		Thomas Gerhold	Republican	2018		
85	Johnson	North Liberty		Amy Nielsen	Democratic	2016	State Government (Ranking Member)	
86	Johnson	Coralville	Official Portrait for the 85th General Assembly	David Jacoby	Democratic	2003	Ways and Means (Ranking Member)	
87	Henry, Jefferson, Van Buren	Fairfield		Jeff Shipley	Republican	2018	Government Oversight (vice chair)	Justice System
88	Jefferson, Keokuk, and Mahaska	New Sharon		Helena Hayes	Republican	2022		
89	Johnson	Iowa City		Elinor Levin	Democratic	2022		Education
90	Johnson	Iowa City		Adam Zabner	Democratic	2022	Natural Resources (Ranking Member)	Transportation, Infrastructure, and Capitals
91	Iowa and Johnson	Oxford		Judd Lawler	Republican	2024	Judiciary (vice chair)	Justice System
92	Johnson and Washington	Washington		Heather Hora	Republican	2022		Agriculture and Natural Resources
93	Scott	Bettendorf		Gary Mohr	Republican	2016	Appropriations (chair)	
94	Scott	Davenport		Mike Vondran	Republican	2022	Public Safety (vice chair)	Justice System
95	Des Moines, Henry, Louisa and Muscatine	Mediapolis		Taylor Collins	Republican	2022	Appropriations (vice chair)	Education
96	Muscatine	Muscatine		Mark Cisneros	Republican	2020		
97	Scott	Davenport		Ken Croken	Democratic	2022		Justice System
98	Scott	Davenport		Monica Kurth	Democratic	2017	Agriculture (Ranking Member)	Agriculture and Natural Resources
99	Des Moines and Lee	Burlington		Matthew Rinker	Republican	2022	Veterans Affairs (vice chair)	Transportation, Infrastructure, and Capitals
100	Lee	Donnellson		Blaine Watkins	Republican	2025		Health and Human Services

== Past composition of the House of Representatives ==
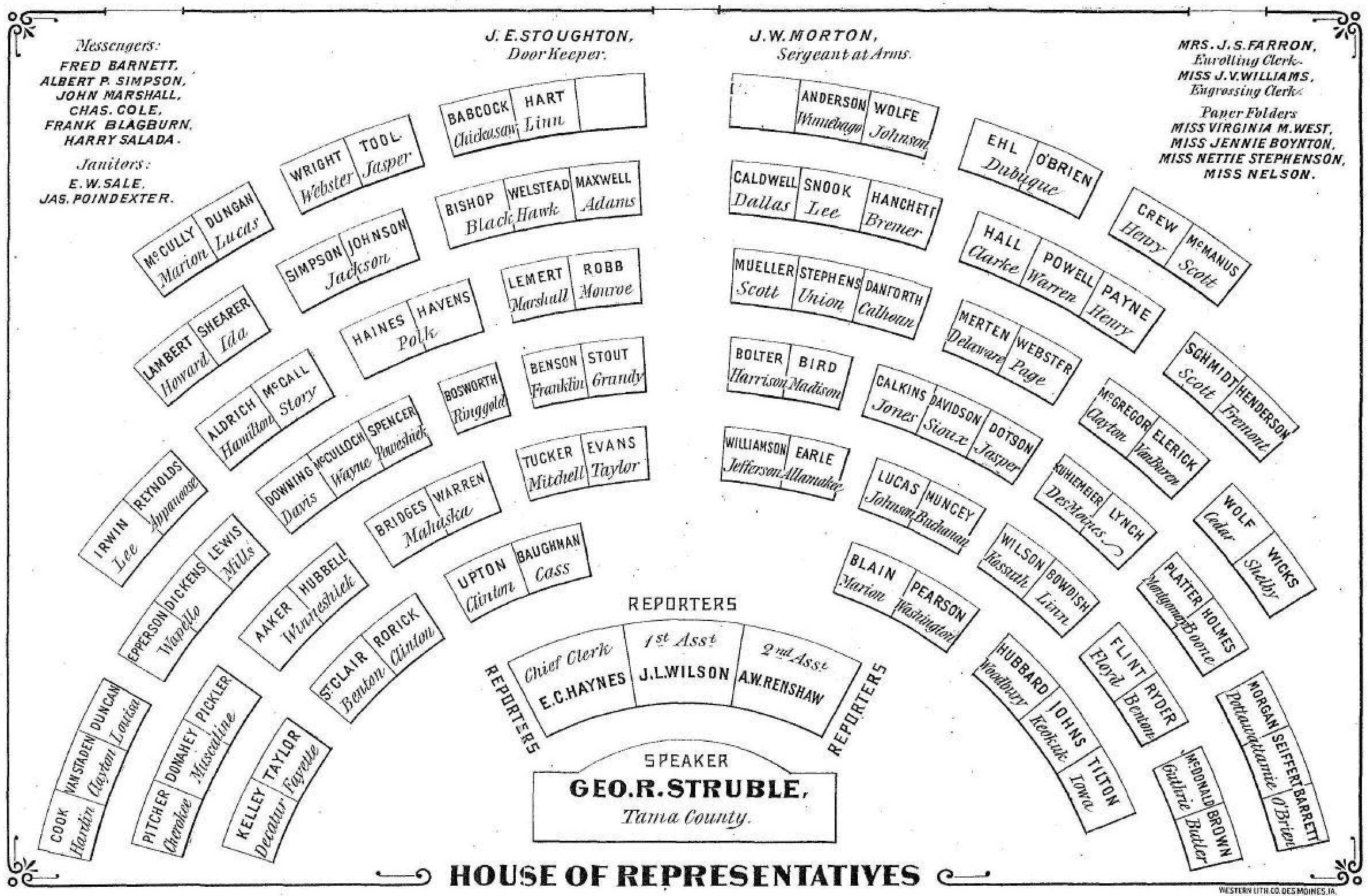
House of Representatives seating chart detail from 1882 Iowa Redbook

== Past notable members ==
=== Federal offices ===
10 members became US Senators including: James F. Wilson, 1883 to 1895, John H. Gear, 1895 to 1900, Albert B. Cummins, 1908 to 1926, Bourke B. Hickenlooper, 1945 to 1969, Jack Miller, 1961 to 1973, Chuck Grassley, 1981 to present

5 members became members of the US House of Representatives including: James F. Wilson, 1861 to 1869, Madison Miner Walden, 1871 to 1873, John H. Gear, 1887 to 1891 and 1893 to 1895, Nathan E. Kendall, 1909 to 1913, Chuck Grassley, 1975 to 1981, Abby Finkenauer, 2019 to 2021

4 members became Federal Cabinet Members including: William W. Belknap, Secretary of War from 1869 to 1876 under President Ulysses S. Grant, George W. McCrary, Secretary of War from 1877 to 1879 under President Grant, John H. Gear, Assistant Secretary of the Treasury from 1892 to 1893 under President Benjamin Harrison, James Wilson, Secretary of Agriculture from 1897 to 1913 under Presidents William McKinley, Theodore Roosevelt and William H. Taft

2 member became President Pro Tempore of the US Senate: Albert B. Cummins, 1919 to 1925 and Chuck Grassley, 2019 to 2025

1 member became an ambassador: Terry Branstad as Ambassador to China from 2017 to 2020

=== State offices ===
16 members became Governor including: William M. Stone, Samuel Merrill, Cyrus C. Carpenter, Joshua G. Newbold, Albert B. Cummins, John H. Gear, George W. Clarke, William L. Harding, Nathan E. Kendall, Frank Merriam (California Governor), Bourke B. Hickenlooper, Robert D. Blue, William S. Beardsley, Leo Hoegh, Robert D. Fulton, Terry Branstad

18 members became Lieutenant Governor including: Benjamin F. Gue, Madison Miner Walden, Joshua G. Newbold, Orlando H. Manning, Warren S. Dungan, James C. Milliman, George W. Clarke, William L. Harding, Ernest Robert Moore, Arch W. McFarlane, Bourke B. Hickenlooper, Robert D. Blue, William H. Nicholas, W. L. Mooty, Robert D. Fulton, Terry Branstad, Robert T. Anderson, Jo Ann Zimmerman

3 members became Attorney General of Iowa including: John H. Mitchell, John M. Rankin and Leo Hoegh.

1 member became Iowa Secretary of Agriculture including: Dale M. Cochran

== Qualifications ==
A state representative must be at least 21 years of age. Other qualifications include U.S. citizenship, Iowa residency for at least one year, and district residency of 60 days prior to election.

== See also ==
- List of members of the 91st session of the Iowa House of Representatives (2025–2026)
- Iowa Senate
