= 2010 Iowa House of Representatives election =

- November 2, 2010

All 100 seats in the Iowa House of Representatives 51 seats needed for a majority
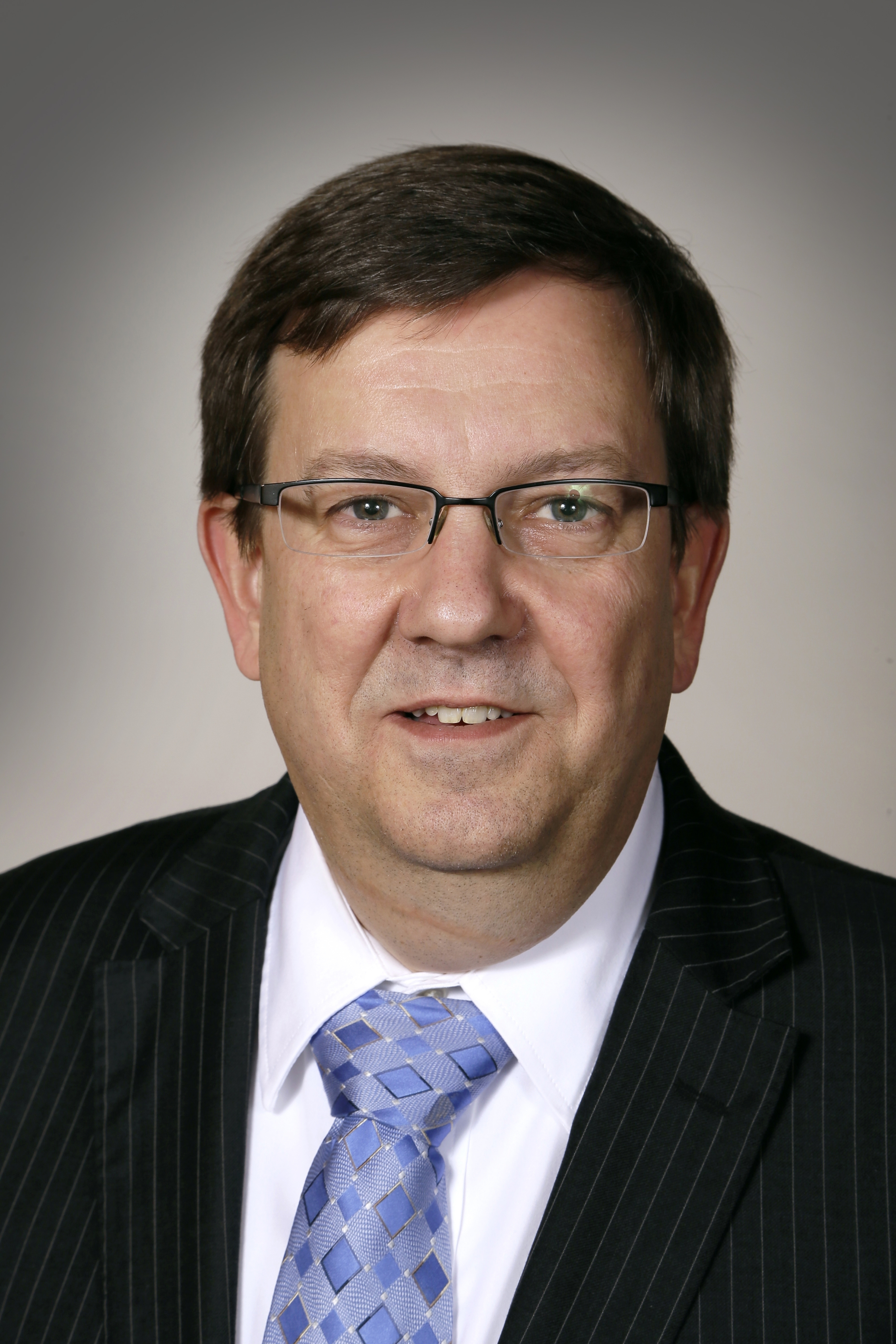

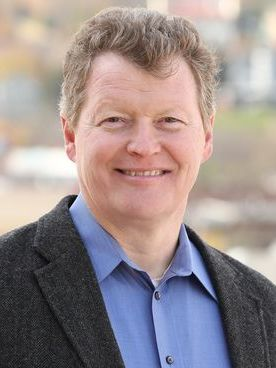
	Majority party	Minority party
Leader	Kraig Paulsen	Pat Murphy
Party	Republican	Democratic
Leader since		January 4, 2003
Leader's seat	35th district	28th district
Last election	43	57
Seats after	60	40
Seat change	▲17	▼17
Speaker of the House before election
Pat Murphy
Democratic
Elected Speaker of the House
Kraig Paulsen
Republican

The 2010 Iowa House of Representatives election was held on November 2, 2010, to determine which party would control the Iowa House of Representatives for the following two years. All 100 seats were up for election and the primary was held on June 8, 2010. Prior to the election 57 seats were held by Democrats and 43 were held by Republicans. The general election saw the Republicans flip 17 seats, thereby regaining their majority that they had lost following the 2006 election.

== Predictions ==
Source	Ranking	As of
Governing	Tossup	November 1, 2010

== Retirements ==
Fourteen incumbents (8 Democrats and 6 Republicans) did not run for re-election in 2010. Those incumbents were:

1. District 1: Wes Whitead (D) retired.
2. District 2: Roger Wendt (D) retired.
3. District 6: Mike May (R) retired.
4. District 7: Marcella Frevert (D) retired.
5. District 8: Dolores Mertz (D) retired.
6. District 14: Mark Kuhn (D) retired.
7. District 26: Polly Bukta (D) retired.
8. District 51: Rod Roberts (R) retired.
9. District 54: Christopher Rants (R) retired.
10. District 65: Wayne Ford (D) retired.
11. District 73: Jodi Tymeson (R) retired.
12. District 74: Kent Sorenson (R) retired.
13. District 84: Elesha Gayman (D) retired.
14. District 99: Doug Struyk (R) retired.

== Incumbents defeated ==
=== In primary ===
1. District 21: Kerry Burt (D) lost renomination to Anesa Kajtazović.

=== In the general election ===
1. District 9: McKinley Bailey (D) lost re-election to Stewart Iverson.
2. District 16: John W. Beard (D) lost re-election to Bob Hager.
3. District 20: Doris Kelley (D) lost re-election to Walt Rogers.
4. District 23: Gene Ficken (D) lost re-election to Dan Rasmussen.
5. District 25: Tom Schueller (D) lost re-election to Brian Moore.
6. District 31: Ray Zirkelbach (D) lost re-election to Lee Hein.
7. District 42: Geri Huser (D) lost re-election to Kim Pearson.
8. District 48: Donovan Olson (D) lost re-election to Chip Baltimore.
9. District 75: Eric Palmer (D) lost re-election to Guy Vander Linden.
10. District 80: Nathan Reichert (D) lost re-election to Mark Lofgren.
11. District 89: Larry Marek (D) lost re-election to Jarad Klein.
12. District 95: Mike Reasoner (D) lost re-election to Joel Fry.
13. District 100: Paul Shomshor (D) lost re-election to Mark Brandenburg.

== Closest races ==
Seats where the margin of victory was under 10%:

1. District 48, 0.22% (gain)
2. District 7, 0.32%
3. District 18, 0.32%
4. District 94, 0.76%
5. District 42, 0.88% (gain)
6. District 24, 1.16%
7. District 25, 1.28% (gain)
8. District 23, 1.90% (gain)
9. District 81, 2.20%
10. District 16, 2.36% (gain)
11. District 41, 2.38%
12. District 43, 3.06%
13. District 28, 3.62%
14. District 49, 3.68%
15. District 26, 4.62%
16. District 19, 4.72%
17. District 29, 5.86%
18. District 100, 5.90% (gain)
19. District 75, 6.10% (gain)
20. District 9, 6.76% (gain)
21. District 74, 6.80%
22. District 31, 7.24% (gain)
23. District 1, 7.30% (gain)
24. District 20, 7.42% (gain)
25. District 37, 8.54%
26. District 15, 8.78%
27. District 2, 8.84%
28. District 90, 9.34%
29. District 86, 9.48%

== Results ==
=== District 1 ===
District 1 election, 2010
Party	Candidate	Votes	%
Republican	Jeremy Taylor	4,645	53.65%
Democratic	David Dawson	4,013	46.35%
Total votes		8,658	100.0%
Republican gain from Democratic			

=== District 2 ===
District 2 election, 2010
Party	Candidate	Votes	%
Democratic	Chris Hall	3,438	54.42%
Republican	Cate Bryan	2,880	45.58%
Total votes		6,318	100.0%
Democratic hold			

=== District 3 ===
District 3 election, 2010
Party	Candidate	Votes	%
Republican	Chuck Soderberg (incumbent)	9,052	100.0%
Total votes		9,052	100.0%
Republican hold			

=== District 4 ===
District 4 election, 2010
Party	Candidate	Votes	%
Republican	Dwayne Alons (incumbent)	11,272	100.0%
Total votes		11,272	100.0%
Republican hold			

=== District 5 ===
District 5 election, 2010
Party	Candidate	Votes	%
Republican	Royd Chambers (incumbent)	8,769	100.0%
Total votes		8,769	100.0%
Republican hold			

=== District 6 ===
District 6 election, 2010
Party	Candidate	Votes	%
Republican	Jeff Smith (incumbent)	8,693	100.0%
Total votes		8,693	100.0%
Republican hold			

=== District 7 ===
District 7 election, 2010
Party	Candidate	Votes	%
Democratic	John Wittneben	5,140	50.16%
Republican	Lannie Miller	5,108	49.84%
Total votes		10,248	100.0%
Democratic hold			

=== District 8 ===
District 8 election, 2010
Party	Candidate	Votes	%
Republican	Tom W. Shaw	7,304	66.06%
Democratic	Susan G. Bangert	3,753	33.94%
Total votes		11,057	100.0%
Republican gain from Democratic			

=== District 9 ===
District 9 election, 2010
Party	Candidate	Votes	%
Republican	Stewart Iverson	5,498	53.38%
Democratic	McKinley Bailey (incumbent)	4,801	46.62%
Total votes		10,299	100.0%
Republican gain from Democratic			

=== District 10 ===
District 10 election, 2010
Party	Candidate	Votes	%
Republican	Dave Deyoe (incumbent)	7,803	62.24%
Democratic	Selden Spencer	4,734	37.76%
Total votes		12,537	100.0%
Republican hold			

=== District 11 ===
District 11 election, 2010
Party	Candidate	Votes	%
Republican	Henry Rayhons (incumbent)	7,286	65.04%
Democratic	Ann Marie Fairchild	3,916	34.96%
Total votes		11,202	100.0%
Republican hold			

=== District 12 ===
District 12 election, 2010
Party	Candidate	Votes	%
Republican	Linda Upmeyer (incumbent)	9,246	100.0%
Total votes		9,246	100.0%
Republican hold			

=== District 13 ===
District 13 election, 2010
Party	Candidate	Votes	%
Democratic	Sharon Steckman (incumbent)	6,235	60.85%
Republican	Brian R. Randall	4,011	39.15%
Total votes		10,246	100.0%
Democratic hold			

=== District 14 ===
District 14 election, 2010
Party	Candidate	Votes	%
Republican	Josh Byrnes	6,696	61.00%
Democratic	Kurt Meyer	4,281	39.00%
Total votes		10,977	100.0%
Republican gain from Democratic			

=== District 15 ===
District 15 election, 2010
Party	Candidate	Votes	%
Democratic	Brian Quirk (incumbent)	5,790	54.39%
Republican	Michael T. Klimesh	4,856	45.61%
Total votes		10,646	100.0%
Democratic hold			

=== District 16 ===
District 16 election, 2010
Party	Candidate	Votes	%
Republican	Bob Hager	5,608	51.18%
Democratic	John W. Beard (incumbent)	5,349	48.82%
Total votes		10,957	100.0%
Republican gain from Democratic			

=== District 17 ===
District 17 election, 2010
Party	Candidate	Votes	%
Republican	Pat Grassley (incumbent)	9,066	100.0%
Total votes		9,066	100.0%
Republican hold			

=== District 18 ===
District 18 election, 2010
Party	Candidate	Votes	%
Democratic	Andrew Wenthe (incumbent)	5,499	50.16%
Republican	Roger Arthur	5,463	49.84%
Total votes		10,962	100.0%
Democratic hold			

=== District 19 ===
District 19 election, 2010
Party	Candidate	Votes	%
Democratic	Bob Kressig (incumbent)	5,577	52.36%
Republican	Darin Beck	5,075	47.64%
Total votes		10,652	100.0%
Democratic hold			

=== District 20 ===
District 20 election, 2010
Party	Candidate	Votes	%
Republican	Walt Rogers	6,997	53.71%
Democratic	Doris Kelley (incumbent)	6,031	46.29%
Total votes		13,028	100.0%
Republican gain from Democratic			

=== District 21 ===
District 21 election, 2010
Party	Candidate	Votes	%
Democratic	Anesa Kajtazović	5,539	58.84%
Republican	John Rooff	3,875	41.16%
Total votes		9,414	100.0%
Democratic hold			

=== District 22 ===
District 22 election, 2010
Party	Candidate	Votes	%
Democratic	Deborah Berry (incumbent)	5,776	100.0%
Total votes		5,776	100.0%
Democratic hold			

=== District 23 ===
District 23 election, 2010
Party	Candidate	Votes	%
Republican	Dan Rasmussen	5,596	50.95%
Democratic	Gene Ficken (incumbent)	5,388	49.05%
Total votes		10,984	100.0%
Republican gain from Democratic			

=== District 24 ===
District 24 election, 2010
Party	Candidate	Votes	%
Democratic	Roger Thomas (incumbent)	5,282	50.58%
Republican	Michael Breitbach	5,160	49.42%
Total votes		10,442	100.0%
Democratic hold			

=== District 25 ===
District 25 election, 2010
Party	Candidate	Votes	%
Republican	Brian Moore	5,484	50.64%
Democratic	Tom Schueller (incumbent)	5,346	49.36%
Total votes		10,830	100.0%
Republican gain from Democratic			

=== District 26 ===
District 26 election, 2010
Party	Candidate	Votes	%
Democratic	Mary Wolfe	4,800	52.31%
Republican	David A. Rose	4,376	47.69%
Total votes		9,176	100.0%
Democratic hold			

=== District 27 ===
District 27 election, 2010
Party	Candidate	Votes	%
Democratic	Charles Isenhart (incumbent)	6,076	64.14%
Republican	Hank Linden	3,397	35.86%
Total votes		9,473	100.0%
Democratic hold			

=== District 28 ===
District 28 election, 2010
Party	Candidate	Votes	%
Democratic	Pat Murphy (incumbent)	5,188	51.81%
Republican	Paul Kern	4,825	48.19%
Total votes		10,013	100.0%
Democratic hold			

=== District 29 ===
District 29 election, 2010
Party	Candidate	Votes	%
Democratic	Nathan Willems (incumbent)	7,487	52.93%
Republican	Shawn Graham	6,658	47.07%
Total votes		14,145	100.0%
Democratic hold			

=== District 30 ===
District 30 election, 2010
Party	Candidate	Votes	%
Democratic	David Jacoby (incumbent)	9,924	79.49%
Libertarian	Dustin Krutsinger	2,560	20.51%
Total votes		12,484	100.0%
Democratic hold			

=== District 31 ===
District 31 election, 2010
Party	Candidate	Votes	%
Republican	Lee Hein	6,280	53.62%
Democratic	Ray Zirkelbach (incumbent)	5,431	46.38%
Total votes		11,711	100.0%
Republican gain from Democratic			

=== District 32 ===
District 32 election, 2010
Party	Candidate	Votes	%
Republican	Steven Lukan (incumbent)	9,919	100.0%
Total votes		9,919	100.0%
Republican hold			

=== District 33 ===
District 33 election, 2010
Party	Candidate	Votes	%
Democratic	Kirsten Running-Marquardt (incumbent)	5,364	63.62%
Republican	Josh Thurston	3,067	36.38%
Total votes		8,431	100.0%
Democratic hold			

=== District 34 ===
District 34 election, 2010
Party	Candidate	Votes	%
Democratic	Todd Taylor (incumbent)	5,959	58.39%
Republican	Jim Burke	4,246	41.61%
Total votes		10,205	100.0%
Democratic hold			

=== District 35 ===
District 35 election, 2010
Party	Candidate	Votes	%
Republican	Kraig Paulsen (incumbent)	10,652	100.0%
Total votes		10,652	100.0%
Republican hold			

=== District 36 ===
District 36 election, 2010
Party	Candidate	Votes	%
Republican	Nick Wagner (incumbent)	10,574	100.0%
Total votes		10,574	100.0%
Republican hold			

=== District 37 ===
District 37 election, 2010
Party	Candidate	Votes	%
Republican	Renee Schulte (incumbent)	6,836	54.26%
Democratic	Mark J. Seidl	5,762	45.74%
Total votes		12,598	100.0%
Republican hold			

=== District 38 ===
District 38 election, 2010
Party	Candidate	Votes	%
Democratic	Tyler Olson (incumbent)	7,136	83.50%
Independent	Jason Marshall	1,410	16.50%
Total votes		8,546	100.0%
Democratic hold			

=== District 39 ===
District 39 election, 2010
Party	Candidate	Votes	%
Republican	Dawn Pettengill (incumbent)	8,556	100.0%
Total votes		8,556	100.0%
Republican hold			

=== District 40 ===
District 40 election, 2010
Party	Candidate	Votes	%
Republican	Lance Horbach (incumbent)	9,004	100.0%
Total votes		9,004	100.0%
Republican hold			

=== District 41 ===
District 41 election, 2010
Party	Candidate	Votes	%
Democratic	Dan Kelley	5,869	51.19%
Republican	Gabriel Swersie	5,595	48.81%
Total votes		11,464	100.0%
Democratic hold			

=== District 42 ===
District 42 election, 2010
Party	Candidate	Votes	%
Republican	Kim Pearson	6,975	48.62%
Democratic	Geri Huser (incumbent)	6,849	47.74%
Independent	Dan Nieland	522	3.64%
Total votes		14,346	100.0%
Republican gain from Democratic			

=== District 43 ===
District 43 election, 2010
Party	Candidate	Votes	%
Democratic	Mark Smith (incumbent)	5,089	51.53%
Republican	Jane A. Jech	4,786	48.47%
Total votes		9,875	100.0%
Democratic hold			

=== District 44 ===
District 44 election, 2010
Party	Candidate	Votes	%
Republican	Annette Sweeney (incumbent)	7,384	68.16%
Democratic	Mike Gerhart	3,449	31.84%
Total votes		10,833	100.0%
Republican hold			

=== District 45 ===
District 45 election, 2010
Party	Candidate	Votes	%
Democratic	Beth Wessel-Kroeschell (incumbent)	4,396	56.47%
Republican	Karin Sevde	3,389	43.53%
Total votes		7,785	100.0%
Democratic hold			

=== District 46 ===
District 46 election, 2010
Party	Candidate	Votes	%
Democratic	Lisa Heddens (incumbent)	8,002	56.34%
Republican	Chad R. Steenhoek	5,850	41.20%
Libertarian	Tyler Pauly	350	2.46%
Total votes		14,202	100.0%
Democratic hold			

=== District 47 ===
District 47 election, 2010
Party	Candidate	Votes	%
Republican	Ralph Watts (incumbent)	13,663	67.10%
Democratic	Roger Huston	6,699	32.90%
Total votes		20,362	100.0%
Republican hold			

=== District 48 ===
District 48 election, 2010
Party	Candidate	Votes	%
Republican	Chip Baltimore	5,384	50.11%
Democratic	Donovan Olson (incumbent)	5,361	49.89%
Total votes		10,745	100.0%
Republican gain from Democratic			

=== District 49 ===
District 49 election, 2010
Party	Candidate	Votes	%
Democratic	Helen Miller (incumbent)	4,857	51.84%
Republican	Matt Alcazar	4,512	48.16%
Total votes		9,369	100.0%
Democratic hold			

=== District 50 ===
District 50 election, 2010
Party	Candidate	Votes	%
Republican	Dave Tjepkes (incumbent)	8,293	100.0%
Total votes		8,293	100.0%
Republican hold			

=== District 51 ===
District 51 election, 2010
Party	Candidate	Votes	%
Democratic	Dan Muhlbauer	6,410	58.70%
Republican	Daniel D. Dirkx	4,510	41.30%
Total votes		10,920	100.0%
Democratic gain from Republican			

=== District 52 ===
District 52 election, 2010
Party	Candidate	Votes	%
Republican	Gary Worthan (incumbent)	6,076	73.64%
Democratic	Danuta Hutchins	2,175	26.36%
Total votes		8,251	100.0%
Republican hold			

=== District 53 ===
District 53 election, 2010
Party	Candidate	Votes	%
Republican	Dan Huseman (incumbent)	8,902	100.0%
Total votes		8,902	100.0%
Republican hold			

=== District 54 ===
District 54 election, 2010
Party	Candidate	Votes	%
Republican	Ron Jorgensen	6,345	66.92%
Democratic	Carlos Venable-Ridley	3,136	33.08%
Total votes		9,481	100.0%
Republican hold			

=== District 55 ===
District 55 election, 2010
Party	Candidate	Votes	%
Republican	Jason Schultz (incumbent)	7,309	100.0%
Total votes		7,309	100.0%
Republican hold			

=== District 56 ===
District 56 election, 2010
Party	Candidate	Votes	%
Republican	Matt Windschitl (incumbent)	7,854	100.0%
Total votes		7,854	100.0%
Republican hold			

=== District 57 ===
District 57 election, 2010
Party	Candidate	Votes	%
Republican	Jack Drake (incumbent)	7,817	100.0%
Total votes		7,817	100.0%
Republican hold			

=== District 58 ===
District 58 election, 2010
Party	Candidate	Votes	%
Republican	Clel Baudler (incumbent)	7,747	78.82%
Independent	Dallas Ford	2,082	21.18%
Total votes		9,829	100.0%
Republican hold			

=== District 59 ===
District 59 election, 2010
Party	Candidate	Votes	%
Republican	Chris Hagenow (incumbent)	7,650	58.13%
Democratic	Andrew McDowell	5,510	41.87%
Total votes		13,160	100.0%
Republican hold			

=== District 60 ===
District 60 election, 2010
Party	Candidate	Votes	%
Republican	Peter Cownie (incumbent)	7,761	64.17%
Democratic	Alan R. Koslow	4,333	35.83%
Total votes		12,094	100.0%
Republican hold			

=== District 61 ===
District 61 election, 2010
Party	Candidate	Votes	%
Democratic	Jo Oldson (incumbent)	7,943	65.02%
Republican	Darlene Blake	4,274	34.98%
Total votes		12,217	100.0%
Democratic hold			

=== District 62 ===
District 62 election, 2010
Party	Candidate	Votes	%
Democratic	Bruce Hunter (incumbent)	5,661	100.0%
Total votes		5,661	100.0%
Democratic hold			

=== District 63 ===
District 63 election, 2010
Party	Candidate	Votes	%
Republican	Scott Raecker (incumbent)	9,543	64.61%
Democratic	John E. Sachs	5,227	35.39%
Total votes		14,770	100.0%
Republican hold			

=== District 64 ===
District 64 election, 2010
Party	Candidate	Votes	%
Democratic	Janet Petersen (incumbent)	6,689	56.66%
Republican	Dan Kennedy	3,626	30.72%
Independent	Vicki Stogdill	1,490	12.62%
Total votes		11,805	100.0%
Democratic hold			

=== District 65 ===
District 65 election, 2010
Party	Candidate	Votes	%
Democratic	Ruth Ann Gaines	4,887	67.45%
Republican	Gary L. Jordan	2,358	32.55%
Total votes		7,245	100.0%
Democratic hold			

=== District 66 ===
District 66 election, 2010
Party	Candidate	Votes	%
Democratic	Ako Abdul-Samad (incumbent)	4,646	100.0%
Total votes		4,646	100.0%
Democratic hold			

=== District 67 ===
District 67 election, 2010
Party	Candidate	Votes	%
Democratic	Kevin McCarthy (incumbent)	6,226	59.87%
Republican	Jeremy L. Walters	4,173	40.13%
Total votes		10,399	100.0%
Democratic hold			

=== District 68 ===
District 68 election, 2010
Party	Candidate	Votes	%
Democratic	Rick Olson (incumbent)	5,747	63.46%
Republican	Dave Dicks	3,309	36.54%
Total votes		9,056	100.0%
Democratic hold			

=== District 69 ===
District 69 election, 2010
Party	Candidate	Votes	%
Republican	Erik Helland (incumbent)	14,681	100.0%
Total votes		14,681	100.0%
Republican hold			

=== District 70 ===
District 70 election, 2010
Party	Candidate	Votes	%
Republican	Kevin Koester (incumbent)	12,655	100.0%
Total votes		12,655	100.0%
Republican hold			

=== District 71 ===
District 71 election, 2010
Party	Candidate	Votes	%
Republican	Jim Van Engelenhoven (incumbent)	8,285	69.48%
Democratic	Pat VanZante	3,640	30.52%
Total votes		11,925	100.0%
Republican hold			

=== District 72 ===
District 72 election, 2010
Party	Candidate	Votes	%
Republican	Rich Arnold (incumbent)	7,264	67.31%
Democratic	Deb Ballalatak	3,528	32.69%
Total votes		10,792	100.0%
Republican hold			

=== District 73 ===
District 73 election, 2010
Party	Candidate	Votes	%
Republican	Julian Garrett	8,826	64.53%
Democratic	Tim Pierce	4,851	35.47%
Total votes		13,677	100.0%
Republican hold			

=== District 74 ===
District 74 election, 2010
Party	Candidate	Votes	%
Republican	Glen Massie	7,472	53.40%
Democratic	Scott Ourth	6,520	46.60%
Total votes		13,992	100.0%
Republican hold			

=== District 75 ===
District 75 election, 2010
Party	Candidate	Votes	%
Republican	Guy Vander Linden	6,015	53.05%
Democratic	Eric Palmer (incumbent)	5,324	46.95%
Total votes		11,339	100.0%
Republican gain from Democratic			

=== District 76 ===
District 76 election, 2010
Party	Candidate	Votes	%
Republican	Betty De Boef (incumbent)	7,218	65.98%
Democratic	Nathan Clubb	3,721	34.02%
Total votes		10,939	100.0%
Republican hold			

=== District 77 ===
District 77 election, 2010
Party	Candidate	Votes	%
Democratic	Mary Mascher (incumbent)	8,211	100.0%
Total votes		8,211	100.0%
Democratic hold			

=== District 78 ===
District 78 election, 2010
Party	Candidate	Votes	%
Democratic	Vicki Lensing (incumbent)	11,364	100.0%
Total votes		11,364	100.0%
Democratic hold			

=== District 79 ===
District 79 election, 2010
Party	Candidate	Votes	%
Republican	Jeff Kaufmann (incumbent)	7,582	72.52%
Democratic	John Archer	2,873	27.48%
Total votes		10,455	100.0%
Republican hold			

=== District 80 ===
District 80 election, 2010
Party	Candidate	Votes	%
Republican	Mark Lofgren	5,458	57.62%
Democratic	Nathan Reichert (incumbent)	4,014	42.38%
Total votes		9,472	100.0%
Republican gain from Democratic			

=== District 81 ===
District 81 election, 2010
Party	Candidate	Votes	%
Democratic	Phyllis Thede (incumbent)	5,397	51.10%
Republican	Carla Batchelor	5,164	48.90%
Total votes		10,561	100.0%
Democratic hold			

=== District 82 ===
District 82 election, 2010
Party	Candidate	Votes	%
Republican	Linda Miller (incumbent)	9,609	100.0%
Total votes		9,609	100.0%
Republican hold			

=== District 83 ===
District 83 election, 2010
Party	Candidate	Votes	%
Republican	Steven Olson (incumbent)	9,224	100.0%
Total votes		9,224	100.0%
Republican hold			

=== District 84 ===
District 84 election, 2010
Party	Candidate	Votes	%
Republican	Ross Paustian	6,259	57.21%
Democratic	Sheri L. Carnahan	4,682	42.79%
Total votes		10,941	100.0%
Republican gain from Democratic			

=== District 85 ===
District 85 election, 2010
Party	Candidate	Votes	%
Democratic	Jim Lykam	6,826	100.0%
Total votes		6,826	100.0%
Democratic hold			

=== District 86 ===
District 86 election, 2010
Party	Candidate	Votes	%
Democratic	Cindy Winckler (incumbent)	3,342	54.74%
Republican	Ray Ambrose	2,763	45.26%
Total votes		6,105	100.0%
Democratic hold			

=== District 87 ===
District 87 election, 2010
Party	Candidate	Votes	%
Republican	Tom Sands (incumbent)	7,163	100.0%
Total votes		7,163	100.0%
Republican hold			

=== District 88 ===
District 88 election, 2010
Party	Candidate	Votes	%
Democratic	Dennis Cohoon (incumbent)	5,702	58.64%
Republican	Dave Selmon	4,022	41.36%
Total votes		9,724	100.0%
Democratic hold			

=== District 89 ===
District 89 election, 2010
Party	Candidate	Votes	%
Republican	Jarad Klein	6,339	53.88%
Democratic	Larry Marek (incumbent)	5,121	43.53%
Green	David Arthur Smithers	305	2.59%
Total votes		11,765	100.0%
Republican gain from Democratic			

=== District 90 ===
District 90 election, 2010
Party	Candidate	Votes	%
Democratic	Curt Hanson (incumbent)	6,183	54.67%
Republican	Stephen Burgmeier	5,126	45.33%
Total votes		11,309	100.0%
Democratic hold			

=== District 91 ===
District 91 election, 2010
Party	Candidate	Votes	%
Republican	Dave Heaton (incumbent)	6,642	67.66%
Democratic	Ron Fedler	3,175	32.34%
Total votes		9,817	100.0%
Republican hold			

=== District 92 ===
District 92 election, 2010
Party	Candidate	Votes	%
Democratic	Jerry Kearns (incumbent)	4,955	57.47%
Republican	Richard Gates	3,667	42.53%
Total votes		8,622	100.0%
Democratic hold			

=== District 93 ===
District 93 election, 2010
Party	Candidate	Votes	%
Democratic	Mary Gaskill (incumbent)	5,350	57.51%
Republican	Jane Hodoly	3,952	42.49%
Total votes		9,302	100.0%
Democratic hold			

=== District 94 ===
District 94 election, 2010
Party	Candidate	Votes	%
Democratic	Kurt Swaim (incumbent)	5,021	50.38%
Republican	James F. Johnson	4,945	49.62%
Total votes		9,966	100.0%
Democratic hold			

=== District 95 ===
District 95 election, 2010
Party	Candidate	Votes	%
Republican	Joel Fry	6,191	56.67%
Democratic	Mike Reasoner (incumbent)	4,732	43.32%
Total votes		10,923	100.0%
Republican gain from Democratic			

=== District 96 ===
District 96 election, 2010
Party	Candidate	Votes	%
Republican	Cecil Dolecheck (incumbent)	8,627	100.0%
Total votes		8,627	100.0%
Republican hold			

=== District 97 ===
District 97 election, 2010
Party	Candidate	Votes	%
Republican	Rich Anderson (incumbent)	7,363	100.0%
Total votes		7,363	100.0%
Republican hold			

=== District 98 ===
District 98 election, 2010
Party	Candidate	Votes	%
Republican	Greg Forristall (incumbent)	9,498	100.0%
Total votes		9,498	100.0%
Republican hold			

=== District 99 ===
District 99 election, 2010
Party	Candidate	Votes	%
Republican	Mary Ann Hanusa	3,919	55.30%
Democratic	Kurt Hubler	3,168	44.70%
Total votes		7,087	100.0%
Republican hold			

=== District 100 ===
District 100 election, 2010
Party	Candidate	Votes	%
Republican	Mark Brandenburg	3,699	52.95%
Democratic	Paul Shomshor (incumbent)	3,287	47.05%
Total votes		6,986	100.0%
Republican gain from Democratic			
