= Iowa's 60th House of Representatives district =

American legislative district

House District 60
- Type: District of the Lower house
- Location: Iowa
- Representative: Jane Bloomingdale
- Parent organization: Iowa General Assembly

The 60th District of the Iowa House of Representatives in the state of Iowa. It is currently composed of Worth and Mitchell Counties, as well as part of Cerro Gordo and Floyd Counties.

== Current elected officials ==
Jane Bloomingdale is the representative currently representing the district.

== Past representatives ==
The district has previously been represented by:

- Ed Skinner, 1971–1973
- Robert Kreamer, 1973–1977
- Douglas Smalley, 1977–1983
- Elaine Baxter, 1983–1987
- Dennis Cohoon, 1987–1993
- William Brand, 1993–1999
- Lance Horbach, 1999–2003
- Libby Jacobs, 2003–2009
- Doris Kelley, 2009-2012
- Walt Rogers, 2013–2019
- Dave Williams, 2019–2023
- Jane Bloomingdale, 2023–2027
- Dani Ollenburg, 2027–Present
