= Wes Whitead =

American politician (1933–2024)

Wesley Whitead
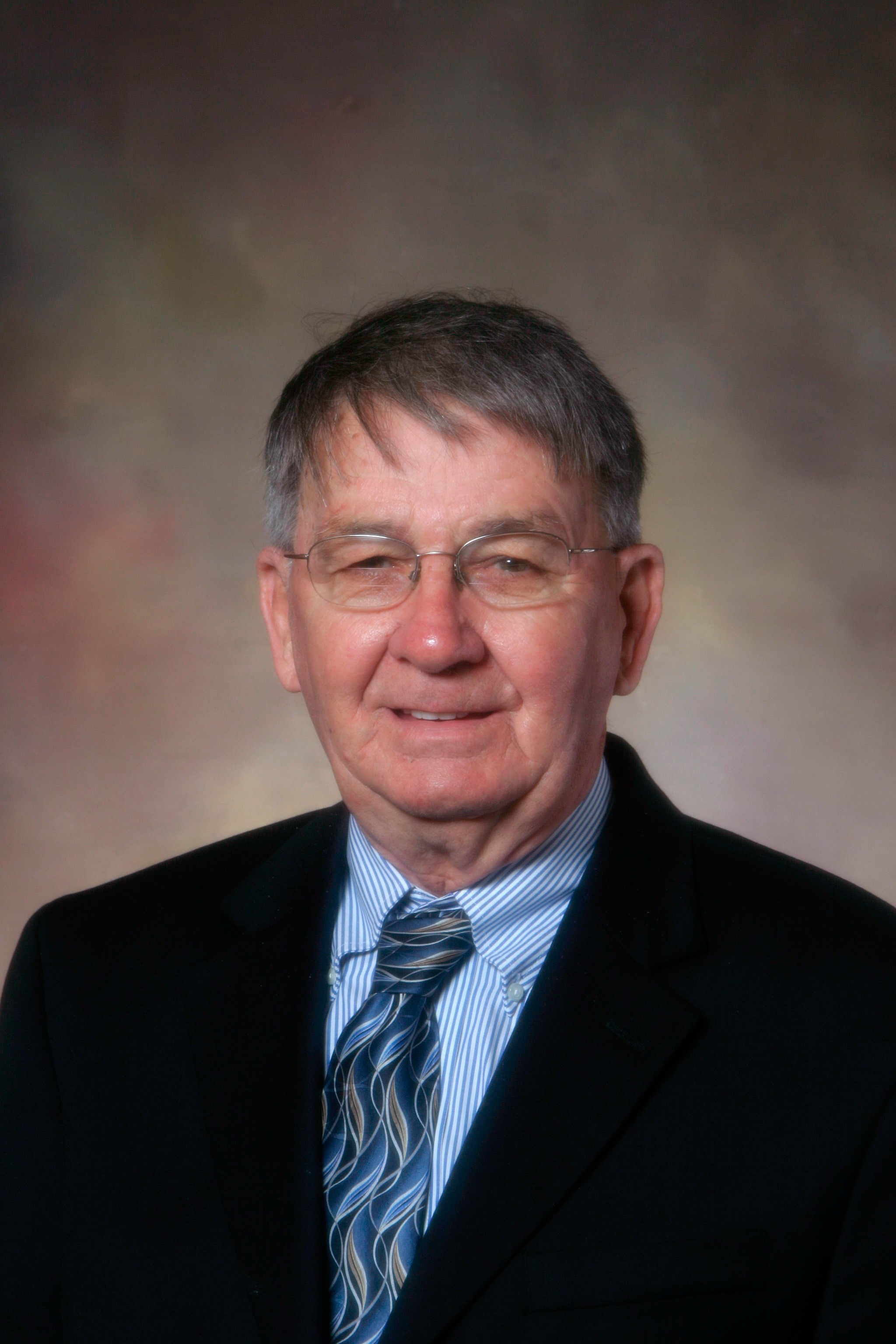

Member of the Iowa House of Representatives from the 1st district
- In office January 13, 2003 – January 9, 2011
- Preceded by: Gregory Hoversten
- Succeeded by: Jeremy Taylor
- In office January 13, 1997 – January 7, 2001
- Preceded by: Ronald Nutt
- Succeeded by: Gregory Hoversten

Personal details
- Born: Wesley Edward Whitead; April 15, 1933 Sioux City, Iowa, U.S.
- Died: February 22, 2024 (aged 90) Sioux City, Iowa, U.S.
- Party: Democratic
- Spouse: Donna
- Website: Representative Whitead

Wesley Edward Whitead (April 15, 1933 – February 22, 2024) was an American politician. He was a Democratic member of the Iowa House of Representatives from the 1st District from 1997-2001 and later 2003-2011.

== Biography ==
Whitead was born in Plymouth County, Iowa, in 1933. In high school, he enlisted in the Army. He served in the Korean War and was later honorably discharged. Following his military service, he owned and a heavy machinery company.

== Political career ==
Whitead served on numerous boards, including the planning and zoning board, the SIMPCO (Siouxland Interstate Metropolitan Planning Council) board, and the Riverside Community Board.

He represented the district from 1997 through 2011, with a two-year interruption from 2001 through 2003, when he was defeated by Republican Gregory Hoversten. He did not run for re-election in 2010.

During his last term in the Iowa House, Whitead served on the Environmental Protection, Local Government, Natural Resources, and Public Safety committees, as well as serving as vice-chair of the Veterans Affairs committee.

=== Endorsements ===
In the 2008 Democratic Party presidential primary, Whitead initially supported John Edwards' campaign in the 2008 Iowa caucuses. In the 2016 Democratic primary, he and his wife Donna were strong supporters of Hillary Clinton's 2016 campaign in that year's 2016 Iowa caucuses.

== Personal life and death ==
Whitead was married to Donna Whitead. Whitead died on February 22, 2024, at the age of 90.

== Electoral history ==
*incumbent

Election	Political result	Candidate	Party	Votes	%
Iowa House of Representatives elections, 1998; District 1 Turnout: 9,999	Democratic gain from Republican	Wesley Whitead	Democratic	5,031	50.3
Iowa House of Representatives elections, 1998; District 1 Turnout: 9,999	Democratic gain from Republican	Ronald W. Nutt*	Republican	4,951	49.5
Iowa House of Representatives elections, 1998; District 1 Turnout: 7,600	Democratic hold	Wesley Whitead*	Democratic	4,043	53.2
Iowa House of Representatives elections, 1998; District 1 Turnout: 7,600	Democratic hold	Mel Adema	Republican	3,547	46.7
Iowa House of Representatives elections, 2000; District 1 Turnout: 10,186	Republican gain from Democratic	Greg Hoverstein	Republican	5,514	54.1
Iowa House of Representatives elections, 2000; District 1 Turnout: 10,186	Republican gain from Democratic	Wesley Whitead*	Democratic	4,622	45.4
Iowa House of Representatives elections, 2002; District 1 Turnout: 8,045	Democratic (newly redistricted)	Wesley Whitead	Democratic	4,831	60.0
Iowa House of Representatives elections, 2002; District 1 Turnout: 8,045	Democratic (newly redistricted)	Keith Radig	Republican	3,207	39.9
Iowa House of Representatives elections, 2004; District 1 Turnout: 12,044	Democratic hold	Wesley Whitead*	Democratic	6,729	55.9
Iowa House of Representatives elections, 2004; District 1 Turnout: 12,044	Democratic hold	Keith Radig	Republican	5,314	44.1
Iowa House of Representatives elections, 2006; District 1 Turnout: 8,062	Democratic hold	Wesley Whitead*	Democratic	5,075	62.9
Iowa House of Representatives elections, 2006; District 1 Turnout: 8,062	Democratic hold	Jamie Simmons	Republican	2,980	37.0
Iowa House of Representatives elections, 2008; District 1 Turnout: 12,254	Democratic hold	Wesley Whitead*	Democratic	6,148	50.2
Iowa House of Representatives elections, 2008; District 1 Turnout: 12,254	Democratic hold	Jeremy Taylor	Republican	6,093	49.7

Iowa House of Representatives
Preceded by Ronald Nutt	1st District; 1997–2001	Succeeded by Greg Hoverstein
Preceded by Greg Hoverstein	1st District; 2003–2011	Succeeded by Jeremy Taylor
