= Ollenburg =

Ollenburg is a surname, and may refer to:

- Dani Ollenburg, American politician
- Herbert Luther Ollenburg (1911–1987), American banker and politician

== See also ==
- Oldenburg
