= Tom Schueller =

American politician

Thomas J. Schueller
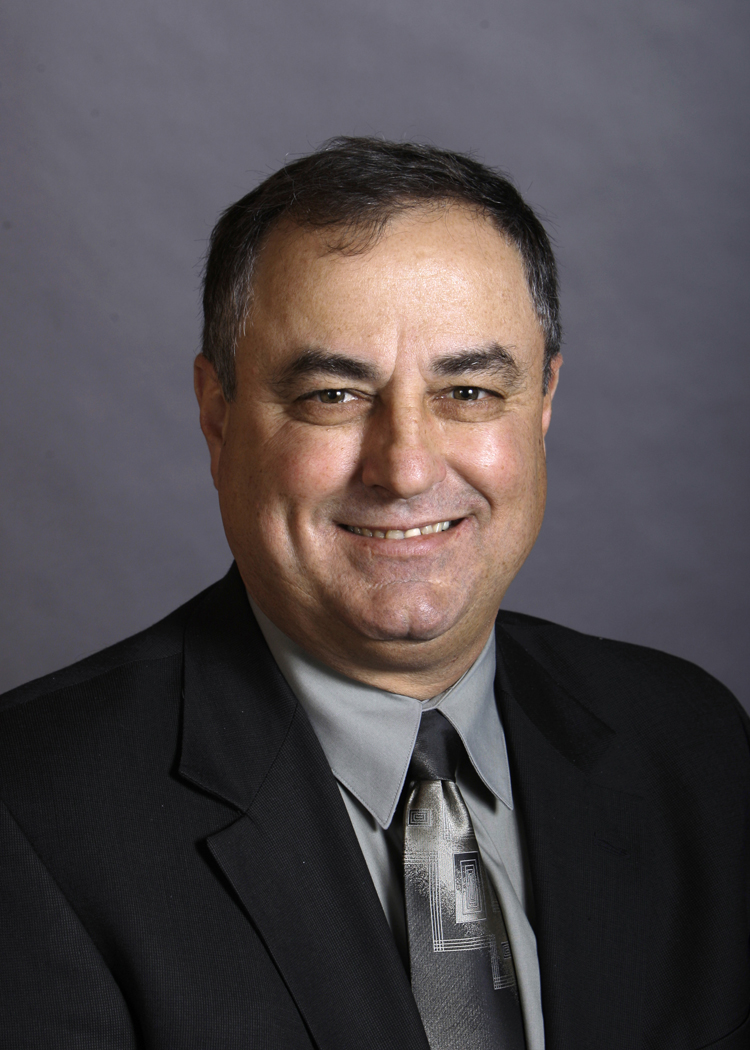

Member of the Iowa House of Representatives from the 25th district
- In office January 10, 2005 – January 9, 2011
- Preceded by: Robert Osterhaus
- Succeeded by: Brian Moore

Personal details
- Born: 1956 (age 69–70) near Dubuque, Iowa
- Party: Democratic
- Website: Schueller's website

Thomas J. Schueller (born 1956) is a former Iowa State Representative. A Democrat, he served in the Iowa House of Representatives from 2005 to 2011, representing the 25th District.

During his last term in the Iowa House, Schueller served on several committees in the Iowa House - the Economic Growth, Local Government, and WAys and Means committees. He also served as chair of the Rebuild Iowa and Disaster Recovery Committee and as a member of the Economic Development Appropriations Subcommittee.

== Electoral history ==
*incumbent

Election	Political result	Candidate	Party	Votes	%
Iowa House of Representatives primary elections, 2004; District 25; Turnout: 1,624	Democratic	Thomas J. Schueller	Democratic	1,057	65.1
Iowa House of Representatives primary elections, 2004; District 25; Turnout: 1,624	Democratic	Jason E. Haynes	Democratic	566	34.9
Iowa House of Representatives elections, 2004; District 25; Turnout: 13,882	Democratic hold	Thomas J. Schueller	Democratic	7,637	55.0
Iowa House of Representatives elections, 2004; District 25; Turnout: 13,882	Democratic hold	Paul H. Carstensen	Republican	6,223	44.8
Iowa House of Representatives elections, 2006; District 25; Turnout: 10,606	Democratic hold	Thomas J. Schueller*	Democratic	6,355	59.9
Iowa House of Representatives elections, 2006; District 25; Turnout: 10,606	Democratic hold	David Bevan Kendell	Republican	3,971	37.4
Iowa House of Representatives elections, 2008; District 25	Democratic hold	Tom Schueller*	Democratic	unopposed	
Iowa House of Representatives elections, 2010; District 25; Turnout: 11,241	Republican gain from Democratic	Brian Moore	Republican	5,484	48.9
Iowa House of Representatives elections, 2010; District 25; Turnout: 11,241	Republican gain from Democratic	Tom Schueller*	Democratic	5,346	47.6

Iowa House of Representatives
Preceded by Robert Osterhaus	25th District; 2005 – 2011	Succeeded by Brian Moore
