= Iowa's 24th House of Representatives district =

American legislative district

House District 24
- Type: District of the Lower house
- Location: Iowa
- Representative: Sam Wengryn
- Parent organization: Iowa General Assembly

The 24th District of the Iowa House of Representatives in the state of Iowa. It is currently composed of Lucas, Decatur, and Wayne Counties, as well as part of Clarke and Appanoose Counties.

== Current elected officials ==
Sam Wengryn is the representative currently representing the district.

== Past representatives ==
The district has previously been represented by:

- Hallie Sargisson, 1971–1973
- Edgar H. Holden, 1973–1975
- Herbert C. Hinkhouse, 1975–1981
- Victor Stueland, 1981–1983
- Harlan W. Van Gerpen, 1983–1985
- Jane Teaford, 1985–1993
- Donald Hanson, 1993–1997
- Willard Jenkins, 1997–2003
- Roger Thomas, 2003–2013
- Cecil Dolecheck, 2013–2023
- Joel Fry, 2023–2025
- Sam Wengryn 2025–Present
