= Iowa's 88th House of Representatives district =

American legislative district

House District 88
- Type: District of the Lower house
- Location: Iowa
- Representative: Helena Hayes
- Parent organization: Iowa General Assembly

The 88th District of the Iowa House of Representatives in the state of Iowa. It is currently composed of Keokuk County, as well as Mahaska and Jefferson Counties.

== Current elected officials ==
Helena Hayes is the representative currently representing the district.

== Past representatives ==
The district has previously been represented by:

- Keith Dunton, 1971–1973
- Keith H. Dunton, 1973–1979
- George R. Swearingen, 1979–1983
- Gene Blanshan, 1983–1993
- Horace Daggett, 1993–1997
- Cecil Dolecheck, 1997–2003
- Dennis Cohoon, 2003–2013
- Tom Sands, 2013–2017
- David Kerr, 2017–2023
- Helena Hayes, 2023–Present
