= Jane Bloomingdale =

American politician in the state of Iowa

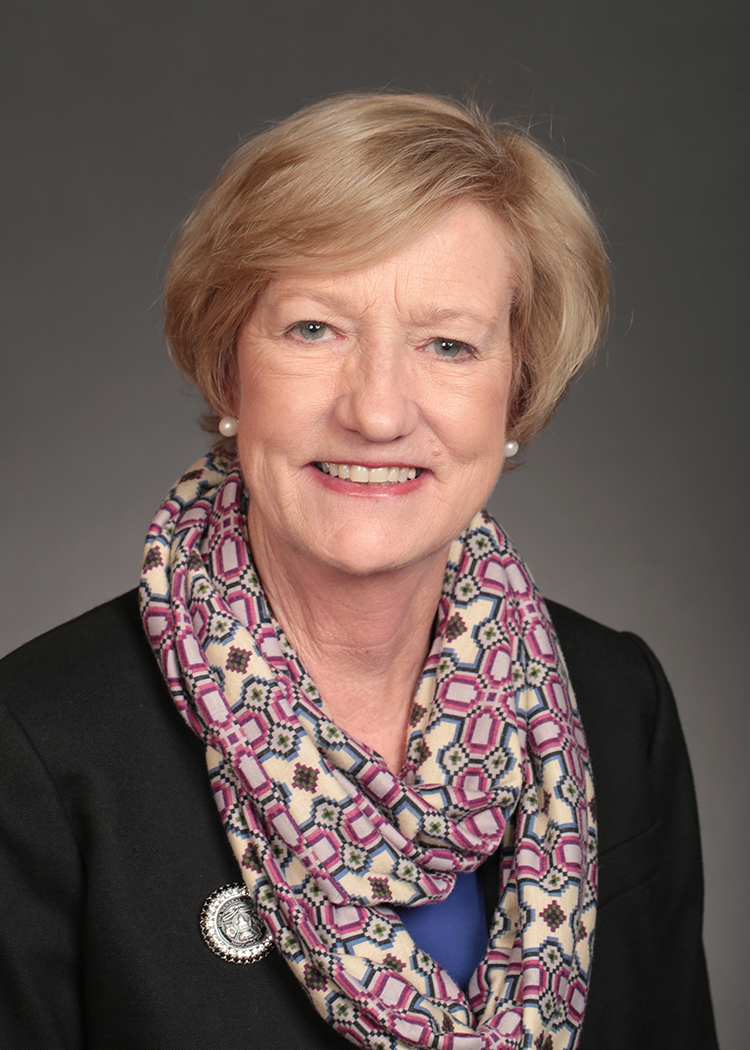
- 88th General Assembly portrait (2019)

Member of the Iowa House of Representatives from the 60th district
- Incumbent
- Assumed office 2017
- Preceded by: Josh Byrnes
- Succeeded by: Dani Ollenburg (elect)

Mayor of Northwood, Iowa
- In office 2013–2017

Personal details
- Born: March 10, 1956 (age 70) Northwood, Iowa, U.S.
- Party: Republican
- Spouse: Jim
- Children: 2
- Profession: accountant

Jane Bloomingdale (born March 10, 1956) is an American politician in the state of Iowa. She was elected to the Iowa House of Representatives in 2016. She previously served on the Northwood City Council and later as mayor of Northwood, Iowa. Outside of politics, Bloomingdale owns Bloomingdale Tax and Accounting.

Bloomingdale graduated from Northwood-Kensett High School, and later from Southern Methodist University.

She has been a member of the Iowa House of Representatives since January 2017, representing District 51. After redistricting, she was elected to District 60, which she continues to represent. Bloomingdale chairs the State Government Committee and is also a member of the Local Government, Public Retirement Systems, and Ways and Means Committees, as well as the Legislative Council.

In 2026, she lost the Republican primary for House District 60 to Dani Ollenburg.

Iowa House of Representatives
Preceded by Dave Williams	60th District; 2023 – present	Succeeded by Incumbent
Preceded by Josh Byrnes	51st District; 2017 – 2023	Succeeded by Dave Deyoe
