= Mike Reasoner =

American politician

Michael J. Reasoner
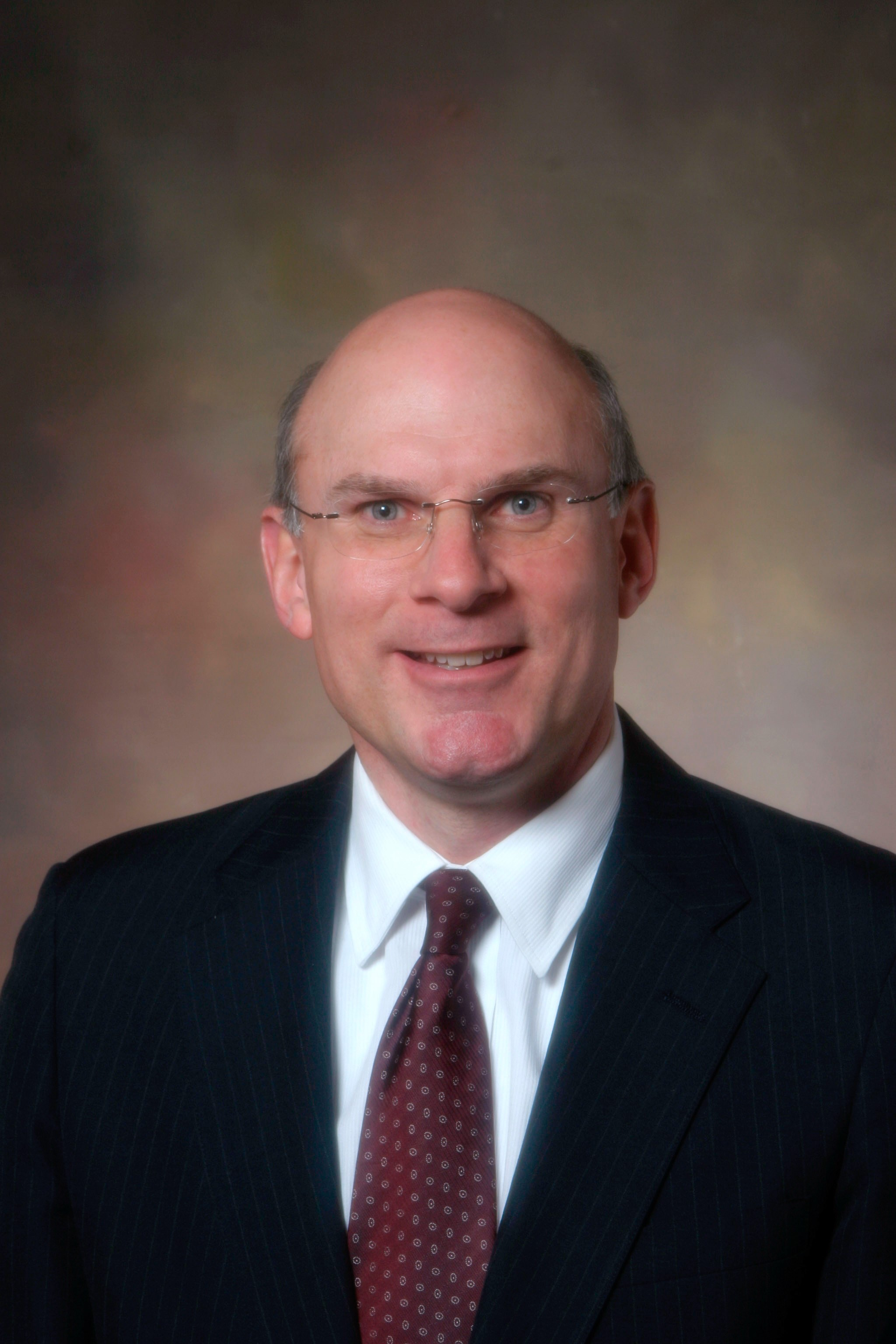

Member of the Iowa House of Representatives from the 95th district
- In office January 13, 2003 – January 12, 2011
- Preceded by: Jim Van Engelenhoven
- Succeeded by: Joel Fry

Personal details
- Born: August 17, 1960 (age 66) Davenport, Iowa
- Party: Democratic
- Spouse: Margaret
- Education: Creighton University; Creighton University School of Law
- Website: Reasoner's website

Michael J. Reasoner (born August 17, 1960) is a former state representative for Iowa's 95th District and a former assistant majority leader. He served in the Iowa House of Representatives from 2003 to 2011. He received his BA and JD from Creighton University School of Law.

During his last term in the Iowa House, Reasoner served on the Administration and Rules, Agriculture, and Ways and Means committees. He also served as vice chair of the Commerce Committee and as a member of the Administration and Regulation Appropriations Subcommtitee. His political experience includes serving as an assistant minority leader in the Iowa House and serving as Union County Supervisor.

== Electoral history ==
*incumbent

Election	Political result	Candidate	Party	Votes	%
Iowa House of Representatives general elections, 1996; District 88; Turnout: 12,006	Republican hold	Cecil Dolecheck	Republican	6,279	52.30%
Iowa House of Representatives general elections, 1996; District 88; Turnout: 12,006	Republican hold	Michael J. Reasoner	Democratic	5,720	47.64%
Iowa House of Representatives elections, 2002; District 95; Turnout: 10,680	Democratic (newly redistricted)	Michael J. Reasoner	Democratic	5,515	51.6
Iowa House of Representatives elections, 2002; District 95; Turnout: 10,680	Democratic (newly redistricted)	Kenneth L. Baker	Republican	5,160	48.3
Iowa House of Representatives elections, 2004; District 95	Democratic hold	Michael J. Reasoner*	Democratic	unopposed	
Iowa House of Representatives elections, 2006; District 95; Turnout: 9,934	Democratic hold	Michael J. Reasoner*	Democratic	6,316	63.6
Iowa House of Representatives elections, 2006; District 95; Turnout: 9,934	Democratic hold	George Barber	Republican	3,499	35.2
Iowa House of Representatives elections, 2008; District 95; Turnout: 13,513	Democratic hold	Michael J. Reasoner*	Democratic	7,604	56.3
Iowa House of Representatives elections, 2008; District 95; Turnout: 13,513	Democratic hold	Doug Smith	Republican	5,905	43.7
Iowa House of Representatives elections, 2010; District 95; Turnout: 11,246	Republican gain from Democratic	Joel Fry	Republican	6,191	55.1
Iowa House of Representatives elections, 2010; District 95; Turnout: 11,246	Republican gain from Democratic	Michael J. Reasoner*	Democratic	4,732	42.1

Iowa House of Representatives
Preceded by Jim Van Engelenhoven	95th District; 2003 – 2011	Succeeded by Joel Fry
