= Joel Fry (politician) =

American politician (born 1974)

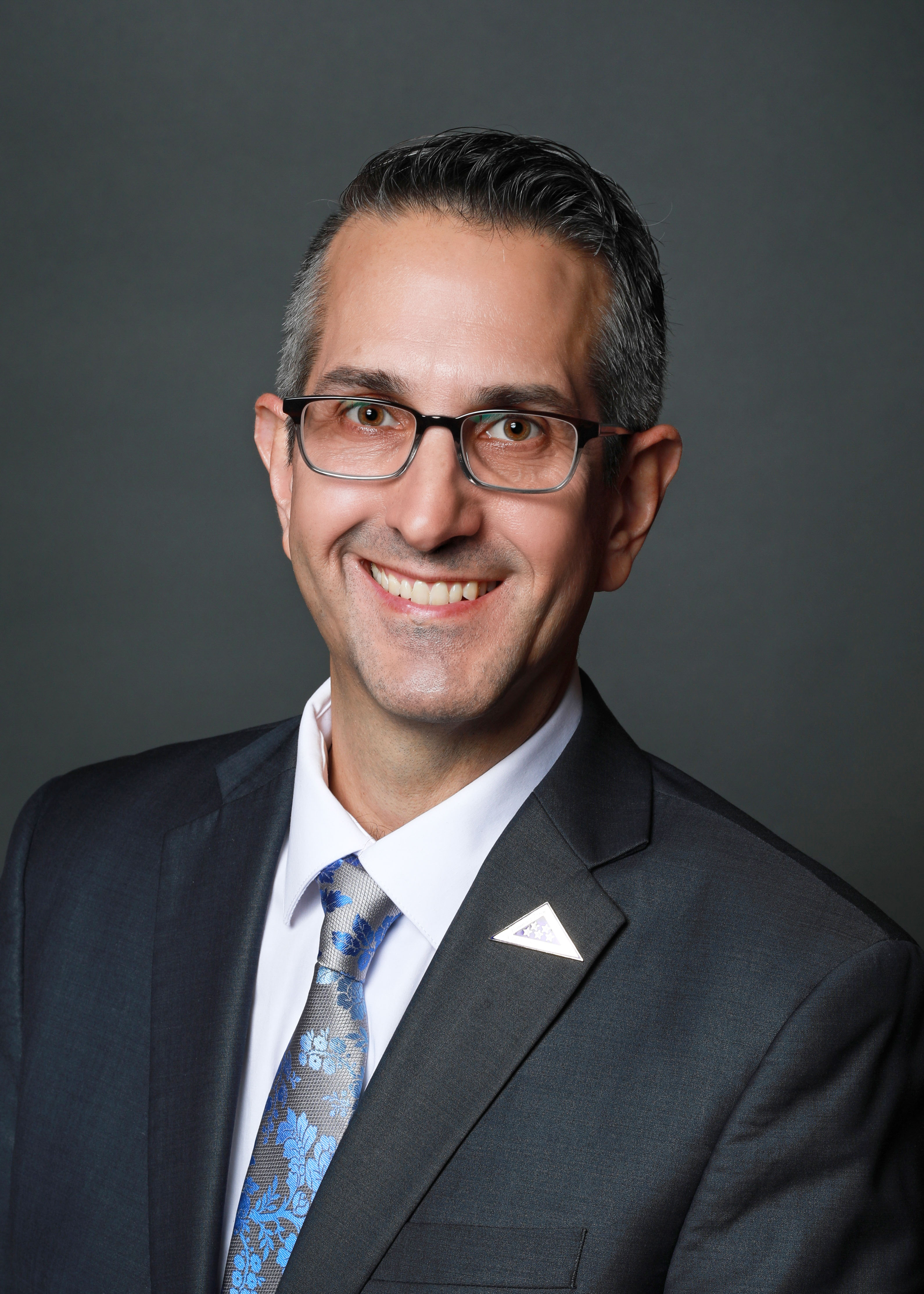
- Fry in 2021

Member of the Iowa House of Representatives from the 24th district
- In office January 10, 2011 – January 13, 2025
- Preceded by: Mike Reasoner
- Succeeded by: Sam Wengryn

Personal details
- Born: June 18, 1974 (age 52) Des Moines, Iowa, U.S.
- Party: Republican
- Education: Simpson College; University of Iowa
- Occupation: Therapist, educator, consultant, speaker
- Website: legis.iowa.gov/...

Nelson Joel Fry (born June 18, 1974) is a former Iowa State Representative from the 24th District. A Republican, he served in the Iowa House of Representatives from 2011 to 2025. Fry was born in Des Moines, Iowa, and was raised and resides in Osceola. He has a B.A. from Simpson College a M.S.W. and an Aging Studies Certificate from the University of Iowa School of Social Work.

As of January 2013, Fry serves on several committees in the Iowa House – the Administration and Rules, Education, Human Resources, Labor, and Public Safety committees. He also serves as an Assistant Leader for the House Republican caucus.

== Biography ==
Fry was born in Des Moines, Iowa, and raised in Osceola. He is a strong advocate for the rights of adoptive parents. He is the adoptive parent of five children.

In 2018, Rep. Fry's brother, Kenny Fry and wife Kelly were arrested on charges stemming from their abuse and neglect of their two children adopted from Ghana. In 2019, the couple pled guilty.

== Electoral history ==
*incumbent

Election	Political result	Candidate	Party	Votes	%
Iowa House of Representatives primary elections, 2010; District 95; Turnout: 3,307	Republican	Joel Fry	Republican	1,754	53.04%
Iowa House of Representatives primary elections, 2010; District 95; Turnout: 3,307	Republican	J.R. Cornett	Republican	1,065	32.20%
Iowa House of Representatives general elections, 2010; District 95; Turnout: 11,246	Republican gain from Democratic	Joel Fry	Republican	6,191	55.05%
Iowa House of Representatives general elections, 2010; District 95; Turnout: 11,246	Republican gain from Democratic	Michael J. Reasoner*	Democratic	4,732	42.08%
Iowa House of Representatives primary elections, 2012; District 27; Turnout: 1,754	Republican	Joel Fry*	Republican	1,473	83.98%
Iowa House of Representatives primary elections, 2012; District 27; Turnout: 1,754	Republican	James Demichelis, Jr.	Republican	249	14.20%
Iowa House of Representatives general elections, 2012; District 27; Turnout: 14,119	Republican (newly redistricted)	Joel Fry*	Republican	8,230	58.29%
Iowa House of Representatives general elections, 2012; District 27; Turnout: 14,119	Republican (newly redistricted)	Ruth Eileen Smith	Independent	3,977	28.17%

Iowa House of Representatives
Preceded by Mike Reasoner	95th District; 2011–2013	Succeeded by Quentin Stanerson
Preceded by Charles Isenhart	27th District; 2013–2023	Succeeded by Kenan Judge
Preceded by Cecil Dolecheck	24th District; 2023–2025	Succeeded by Sam Wengryn
