= Helena Hayes =

American politician

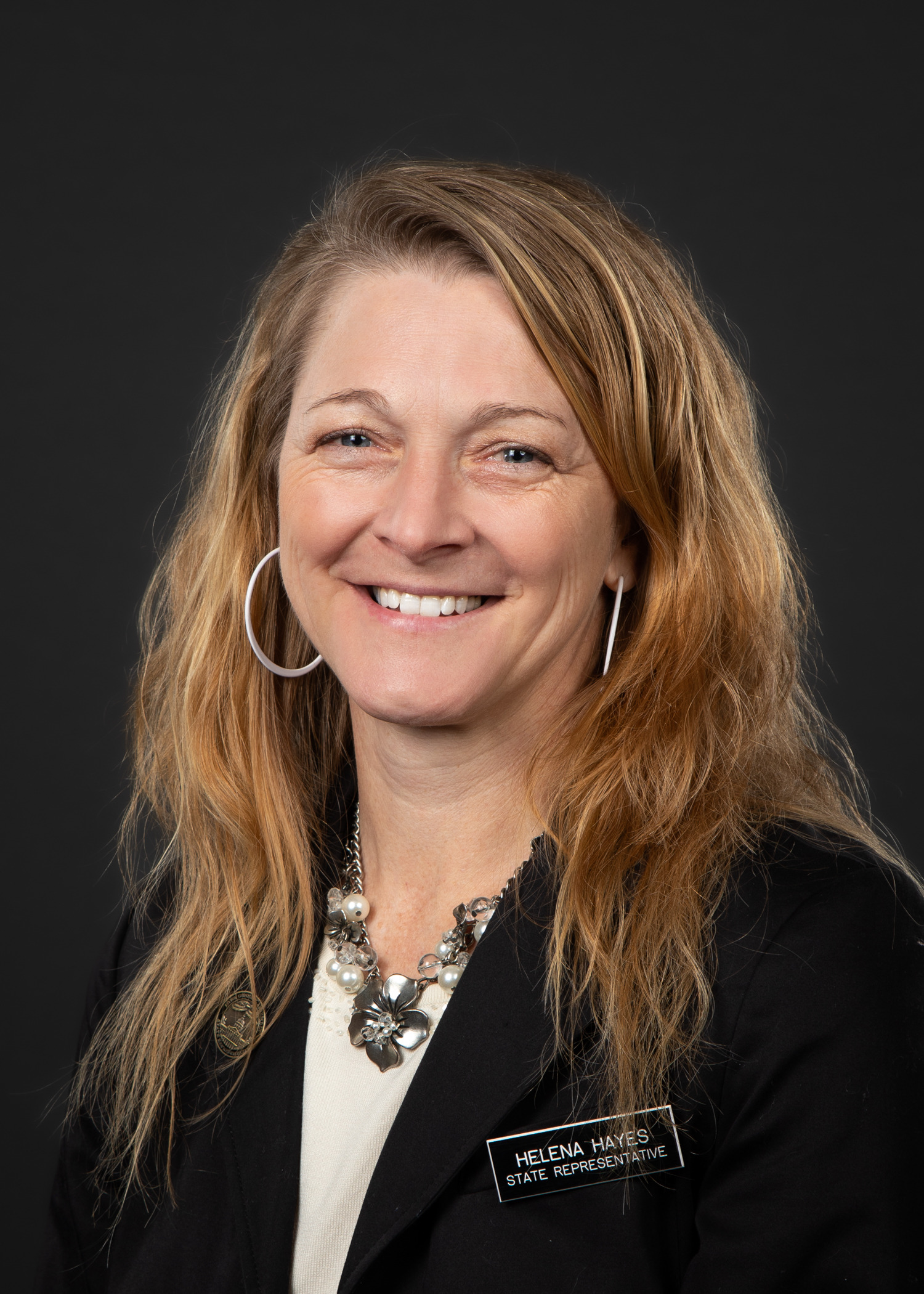

Member of the Iowa House of Representatives from the 88th district
- Incumbent
- Assumed office January 9, 2023
- Preceded by: David Kerr

Personal details
- Party: Republican
- Education: Simpson College (B.A.)

Helena Hayes is an American politician who has served as a member of the Iowa House of Representatives for the 88th district since January 9, 2023.

== Early life and education ==
Hayes was born in Harrison County, Iowa. She earned a B.A. in environmental science and biology from Simpson College.

== Career ==
A member of the Republican Party, Hayes ran for election to the Iowa House in 2022. She won the general election on November 8, 2022, defeating her Democratic opponent Lisa Ossian. Hayes was reelected in 2024 in an uncontested race and declared her candadcy for the 2026 race where she is also running opposed.

In 2024, Hayes was the sponsor of a bill that passed in the House and allowed chaplains to work or volunteer in public schools. It would also place limits on the credentials school districts could require before they were eligible. The bill was criticized by Democrats, including Sen. Trone Garriott, a former chaplain, as allowing unqualified individuals around children and ultimately died in the Senate without being enacted.

In 2025, Hayes had a dispute with former Oskaloosa Community School Board President Charlie Comfort regarding the results of a re-audit after Comfort stated that no evidence of wrongdoing or fiscal misconduct by district staff was found. The audit was eventually published in 2026, and flagged procedural issues but found no fraud or wrongdoing by the Board.

In 2026, Hayes has been active in opposing a carbon pipeline in Iowa.
