= Horace Daggett =

American politician (1931–1998)

Member of the Iowa House of Representatives from the 88th district
- In office January 11, 1993 – January 12, 1997
- Preceded by: Gene Blanshan
- Succeeded by: Cecil Dolecheck

Member of the Iowa House of Representatives from the 92nd district
- In office January 10, 1983 – January 10, 1993
- Preceded by: Doug Shull
- Succeeded by: Keith Kreiman

Member of the Iowa House of Representatives from the 96th district
- In office January 8, 1973 – January 9, 1983
- Preceded by: Delmont Moffitt
- Succeeded by: Louis Muhlbauer

Personal details
- Born: Horace Clinton Daggett; May 15, 1931 Prescott, Iowa, U.S.
- Died: June 16, 1998 (aged 67)
- Party: Republican
- Spouse: Ruth Foster (m. 1952)
- Children: 3
- Occupation: Politician, farmer

Horace Clinton Daggett (May 15, 1931 – June 16, 1998) was an American farmer and politician.

Born in Prescott, Adams County, Iowa, Daggett went to public schools in Prescott, Iowa. He served in the Iowa National Guard. Daggett was a farmer, mechanic, and school bus driver. He served on the Lenox Community School Board and served as president of the school board. From 1973 to 1997, Daggett served in the Iowa House of Representatives and was a Republican.
