= Brian Moore (Iowa politician) =

American politician

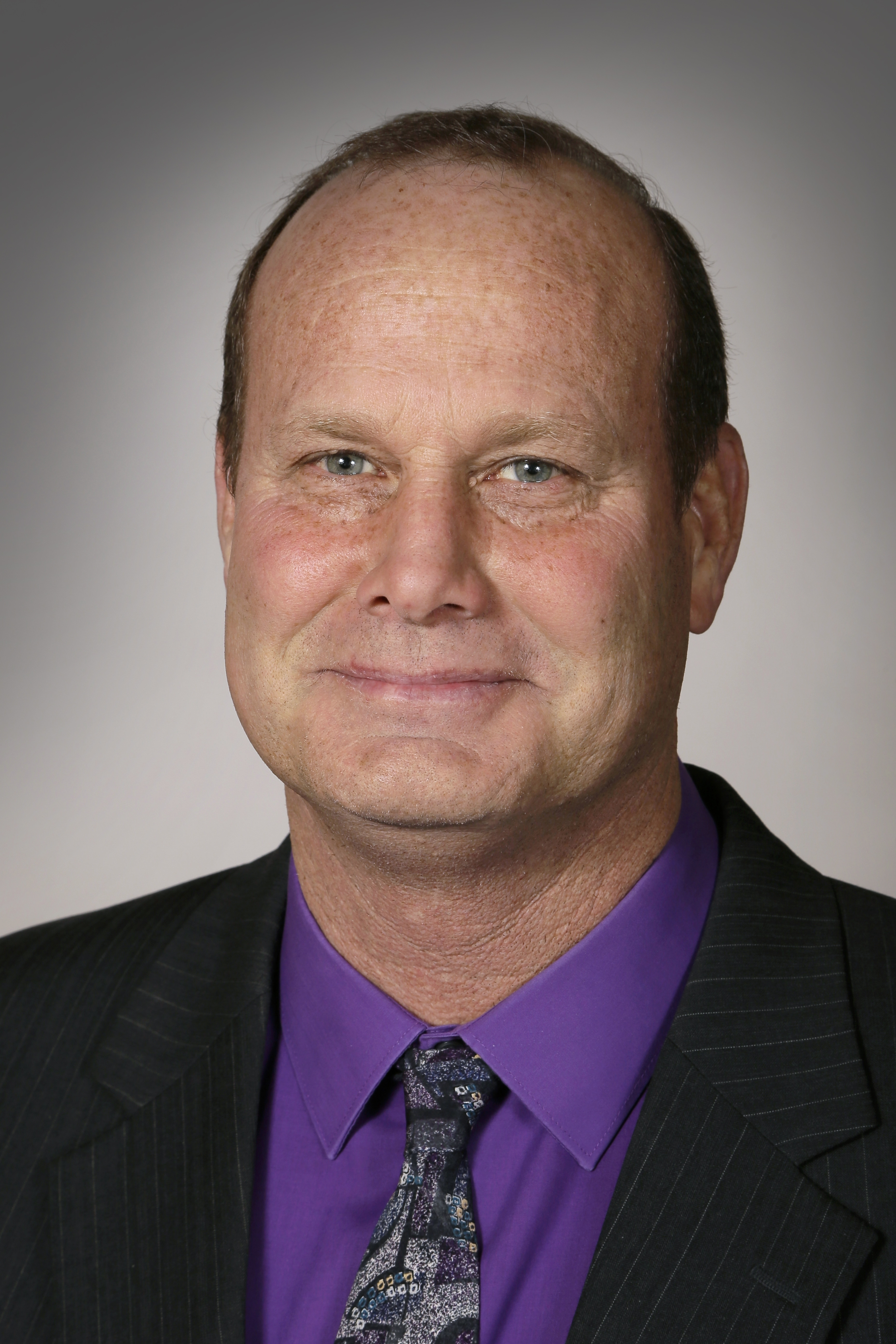

Member of the Iowa House of Representatives from the 58th district 25th (2011–2013)
- Incumbent
- Assumed office January 10, 2011
- Preceded by: Tom Schueller

Personal details
- Born: February 1, 1962 (age 64) Maquoketa, Iowa, U.S.
- Party: Republican
- Spouse: Kim
- Children: 8
- Education: Kirkwood Community College
- Profession: Farmer, Truck Driver
- Website: legis.iowa.gov/...

Brian Moore (born February 1, 1962) is a member of the Iowa House of Representatives first elected in 2010.

As of January 2013, Moore serves on several committees in the Iowa House – the Agriculture, Economic Growth, and Ways and Means committees, as well as the Transportation, Infrastructure and Capitals Appropriations budget subcommittee. He serves as the Vice Chair of the Transportation committee.

== Biography ==
Moore is a lifelong Jackson County resident. He graduated from Maquoketa Community Schools and then attended college. He is his associate degree in Ag Business from Kirkwood Community College. After graduation, he returned to rural Jackson County to farm.

In 1983, Brian married Kim, a teacher at Marquette Catholic High School in Bellevue. Together Brian and Kim have eight children and three grandsons.

He owns Elwood Feed & Livestock, a livestock transportation business. He is also a member of the Jackson County Cattlemen's Association, the Farm Bureau, the Bellevue Marquette Booster Club, and the Optimist Chapter of the Eagles Club.

== Electoral history ==
*incumbent

| Election | Political result | Candidate | Party | Votes | % |
|---|---|---|---|---|---|
| Iowa Senate primary elections, 2010; District 13; Turnout: 2,685 | Democratic | Tod Bowman* | Democratic | 1,573 | 58.58% |
| Iowa Senate primary elections, 2010; District 13; Turnout: 2,685 | Democratic | Brian Moore | Democratic | 729 | 27.15% |
| Iowa Senate primary elections, 2010; District 13; Turnout: 2,685 | Democratic | Ed O'Neil | Democratic | 232 | 8.64% |
| Iowa Senate primary elections, 2010; District 13; Turnout: 2,685 | Democratic | Paul Feller | Democratic | 54 | 2.01% |
| Iowa House of Representatives general elections, 2010; District 25; Turnout: 11,241 | Republican gain from Democratic | Brian Moore | Republican | 5,484 | 48.79% |
| Iowa House of Representatives general elections, 2010; District 25; Turnout: 11,241 | Republican gain from Democratic | Tom Schueller* | Democratic | 5,346 | 47.56% |
| Iowa House of Representatives primary elections, 2012; District 58 | Republican | Brian Moore* | Republican | unopposed | |
| Iowa House of Representatives general elections, 2012; District 58; Turnout: 16,101 | Republican (newly redistricted) | Brian Moore* | Republican | 7,964 | 49.46% |
| Iowa House of Representatives general elections, 2012; District 58; Turnout: 16,101 | Republican (newly redistricted) | Tom Schueller | Democratic | 7,549 | 46.89% |

Iowa House of Representatives
| Preceded by Tom Schueller | 25th District; 2011–2013 | Succeeded by Julian Garrett |
| Preceded by Clel Baudler | 58th District; 2013–present | Succeeded by Incumbent |
