= Heather Hora =

American politician

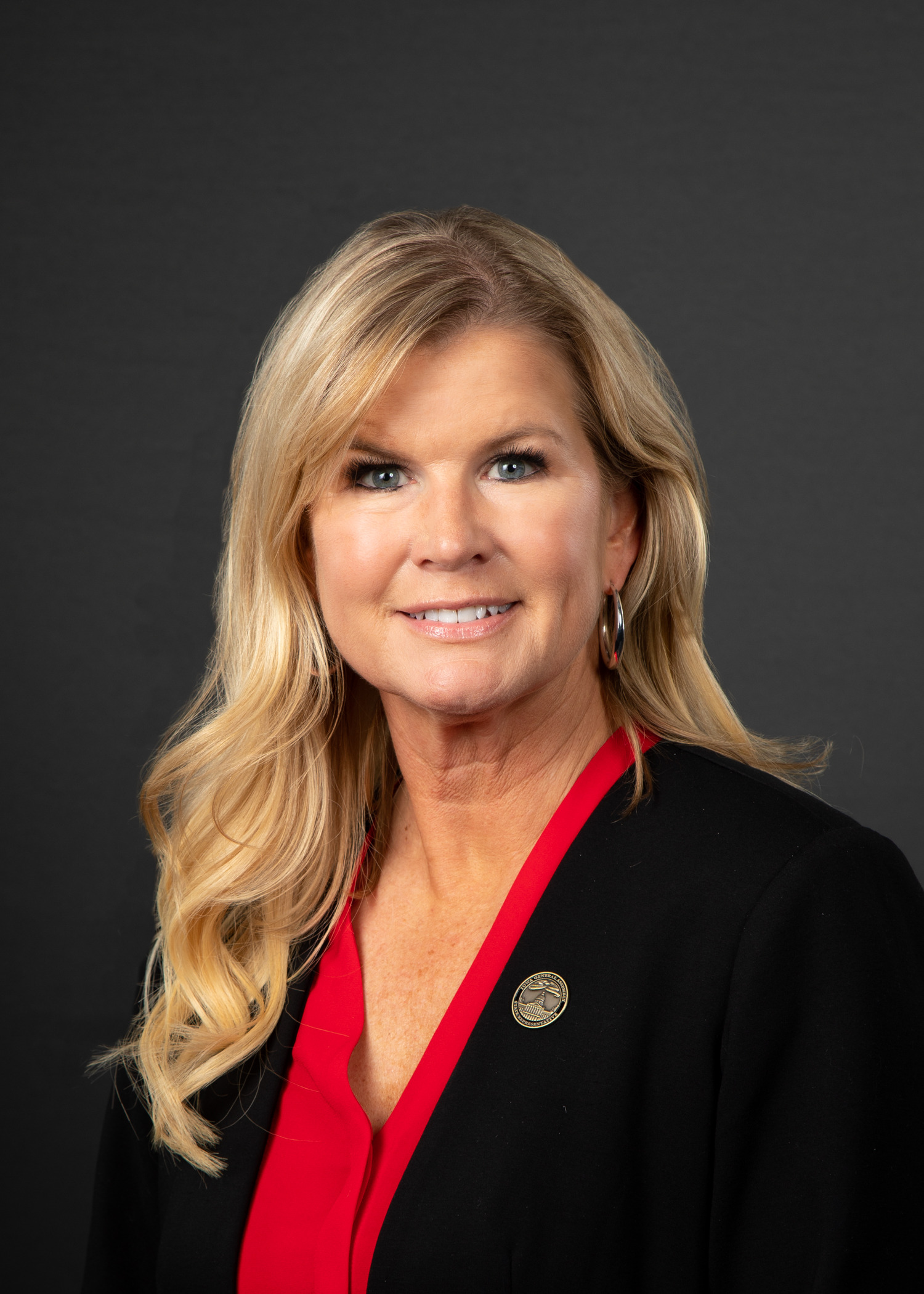

Member of the Iowa House of Representatives from the 92nd district
- Incumbent
- Assumed office January 9, 2023
- Preceded by: Ross Paustian

Personal details
- Party: Republican
- Spouse: Kurt
- Occupation: farmer, politician

Heather Hora (born c. 1970) is an American politician.

== Early life ==
Born in Riverside, Iowa, near Iowa City, Hora spent a portion of her childhood in Minneapolis, before returning to complete her secondary education in the Highland Community School District. She and her husband Kurt own H. K. Farms, near Washington, Iowa, which has been a family-owned farm for five generations.

== Political career ==
Hora was a Republican Party candidate for District 39 of the Iowa Senate in the 2018 election, losing to Kevin Kinney. Hora began campaigning for the District 92 seat of the Iowa House of Representatives in April 2022. She defeated Washington mayor Jaron Rosien in the June 2022 Republican Party primary. After Democratic Party candidate Ty Bopp withdrew from the race, Hora defeated Democrat Eileen Beran in the November 2022 general election.
