= Sam Wengryn =

American politician

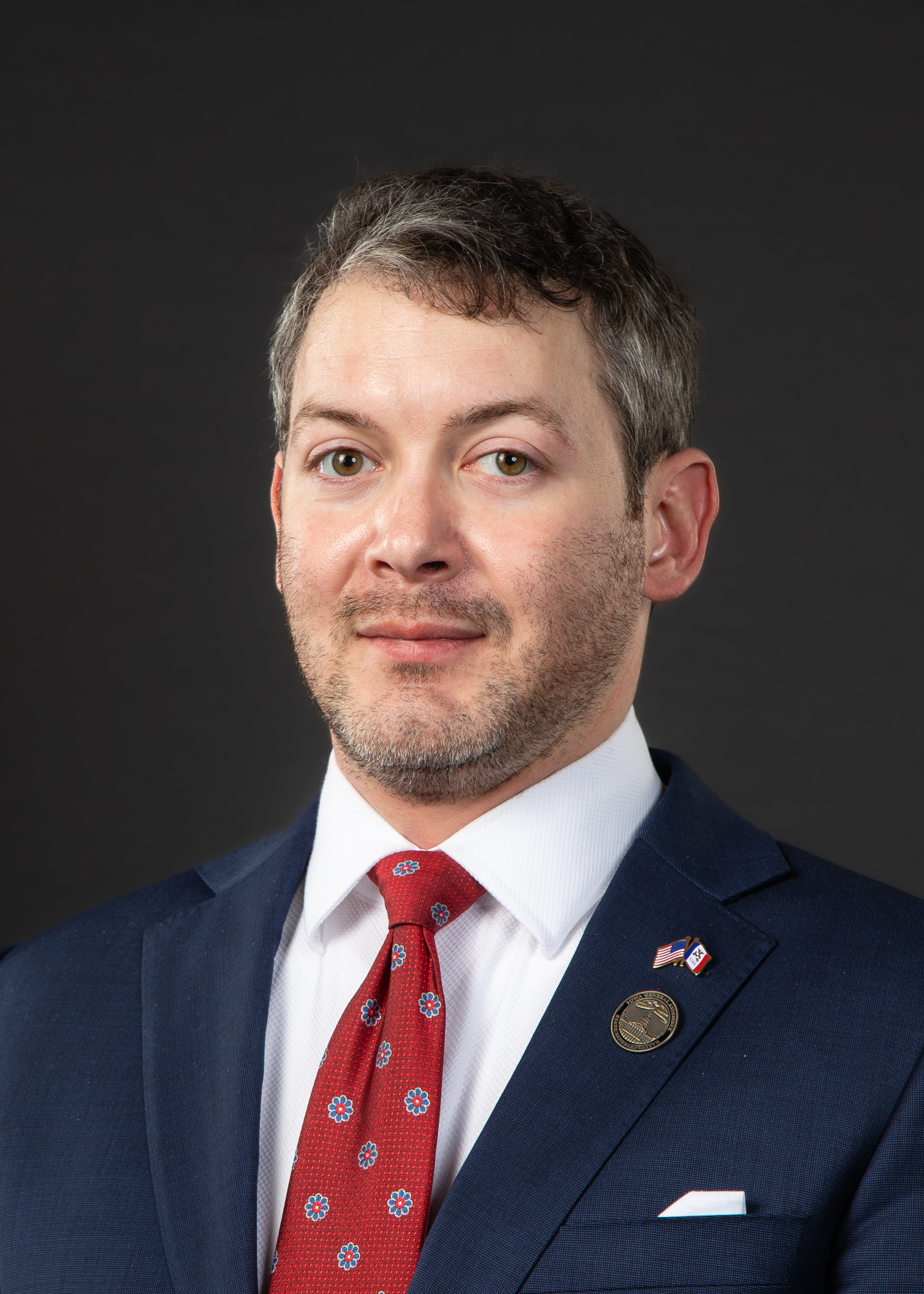

Member of the Iowa House of Representatives from the 24th district
- Incumbent
- Assumed office January 13, 2025
- Preceded by: Joel Fry

Personal details
- Party: Republican
- Education: Iowa State University

Samuel John Wengryn is an American politician. He serves as a Republican member for the 24th district in the Iowa House of Representatives since 2025.

Wengryn is a graduate of Iowa State University and served on the Decatur County Board of Supervisors.
