= Cecil Dolecheck =

American politician (born 1951)

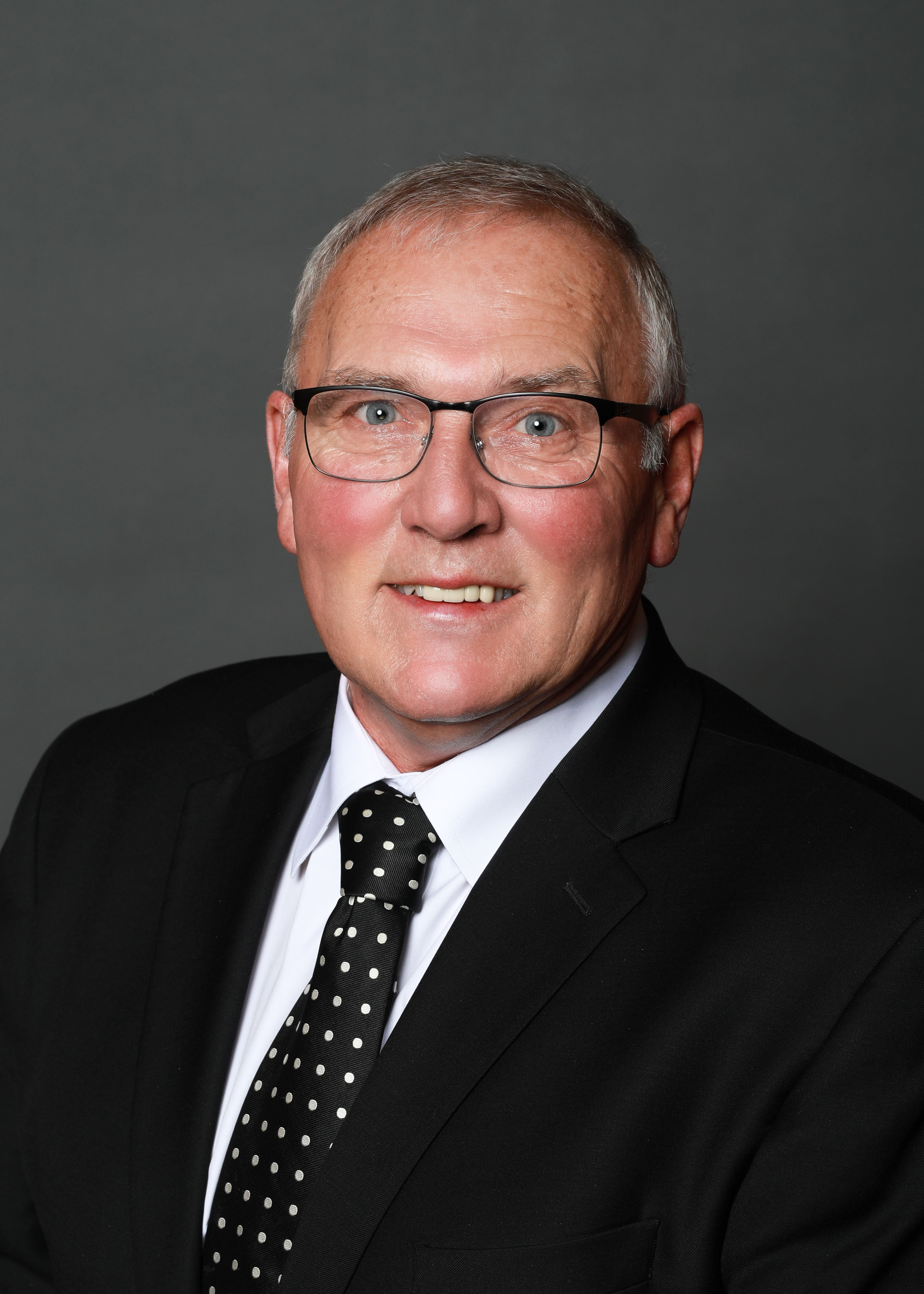
- Dolecheck in 2021

Member of the Iowa House of Representatives from the 24th district 96th (2003–2013) 88th (1997–2003)
- In office January 13, 1997 – January 9, 2023
- Preceded by: Horace Daggett
- Succeeded by: Joel Fry (redistricting)

Personal details
- Born: May 30, 1951 (age 75) Mount Ayr, Iowa, U.S.
- Party: Republican
- Education: Iowa State University
- Occupation: Farmer
- Website: legis.iowa.gov/...

Cecil A. Dolecheck (born May 30, 1951) is a former Iowa State Representative from the 24th District. A Republican, he served in the Iowa House of Representatives from 1997 to 2023. Dolecheck was born, raised, and resides in Mount Ayr, Iowa. He attended Iowa State University.

As of January 2013, Dolecheck serves on several committees in the Iowa House – the Appropriations, Education, Local Government, and Natural Resources committees. He also serves as the chair of the Education Appropriations Subcommittee. His political experience includes serving as Assistant Majority Leader of the Iowa House and as a Ringgold County Voting Delegate with Farm Bureau.

== Electoral history ==
*incumbent

88th District contests

Election	Political result	Candidate	Party	Votes	%
Iowa House of Representatives primary elections, 1996; District 88; Turnout: 3,232	Republican	Cecil Dolecheck	Republican	1,590	49.20%
Iowa House of Representatives primary elections, 1996; District 88; Turnout: 3,232	Republican	Dean Johnston	Republican	1,470	45.48%
Iowa House of Representatives general elections, 1996; District 88; Turnout: 12,006	Republican hold	Cecil Dolecheck	Republican	6,279	52.30%
Iowa House of Representatives general elections, 1996; District 88; Turnout: 12,006	Republican hold	Michael J. Reasoner	Democratic	5,720	47.64%
Iowa House of Representatives primary elections, 1998; District 88	Republican	Cecil Dolecheck*	Republican	unopposed	
Iowa House of Representatives general elections, 1998; District 88; Turnout: 10,166	Republican hold	Cecil Dolecheck*	Republican	5,183	50.98%
Iowa House of Representatives general elections, 1998; District 88; Turnout: 10,166	Republican hold	Richard Flynn	Democratic	4,981	49.00%
Iowa House of Representatives primary elections, 2000; District 88	Republican	Cecil Dolecheck*	Republican	unopposed	
Iowa House of Representatives general elections, 2000; District 88; Turnout: 12,499	Republican hold	Cecil Dolecheck*	Republican	7,020	56.16%
Iowa House of Representatives general elections, 2000; District 88; Turnout: 12,499	Republican hold	Rich Flynn	Democratic	5,478	43.83%

Early 96th District contests

Election	Political result	Candidate	Party	Votes	%
Iowa House of Representatives primary elections, 2002; District 96	Republican	Cecil Dolecheck*	Republican	unopposed	
Iowa House of Representatives general elections, 2002; District 96	Republican (newly redistricted)	Cecil Dolecheck*	Republican	unopposed	
Iowa House of Representatives primary elections, 2004; District 96	Republican	Cecil Dolecheck*	Republican	unopposed	
Iowa House of Representatives general elections, 2004; District 96; Turnout: 13,784	Republican hold	Cecil Dolecheck*	Republican	8,434	61.19%
Iowa House of Representatives general elections, 2004; District 96; Turnout: 13,784	Republican hold	Steve Adams	Democratic	5,339	38.73%
Iowa House of Representatives primary elections, 2006; District 96	Republican	Cecil Dolecheck*	Republican	unopposed	
Iowa House of Representatives general elections, 2006; District 96	Republican hold	Cecil Dolecheck*	Republican	unopposed	

Election	Political result	Candidate	Party	Votes	%
Iowa House of Representatives primary elections, 2008; District 96	Republican	Cecil Dolecheck*	Republican	unopposed	
Iowa House of Representatives general elections, 2008; District 96; Turnout: 13,241	Republican hold	Cecil Dolecheck*	Republican	7,840	59.21%
Iowa House of Representatives general elections, 2008; District 96; Turnout: 13,241	Republican hold	Dennis R. Cooper	Democratic	5,269	39.79%
Iowa House of Representatives primary elections, 2010; District 96	Republican	Cecil Dolecheck*	Republican	unopposed	
Iowa House of Representatives general elections, 2010; District 96	Republican hold	Cecil Dolecheck*	Republican	unopposed	
Iowa House of Representatives primary elections, 2012; District 24; Turnout: 3,504	Republican	Cecil Dolecheck*	Republican	1,911	54.54%
Iowa House of Representatives primary elections, 2012; District 24; Turnout: 3,504	Republican	Jane C. Jensen	Republican	1,330	37.96%
Iowa House of Representatives general elections, 2012; District 24	Republican (newly redistricted)	Cecil Dolecheck*	Republican	unopposed	

Iowa House of Representatives
Preceded by Horace Daggett	88th District; 1997–2003	Succeeded by Dennis Cohoon
Preceded by Jim Van Engelenhoven	96th District; 2003–2013	Succeeded by Lee Hein
Preceded by Roger Thomas	24th District; 2013–2023	Succeeded by Joel Fry
