= Jim Van Engelenhoven =

American politician (1943–2021)

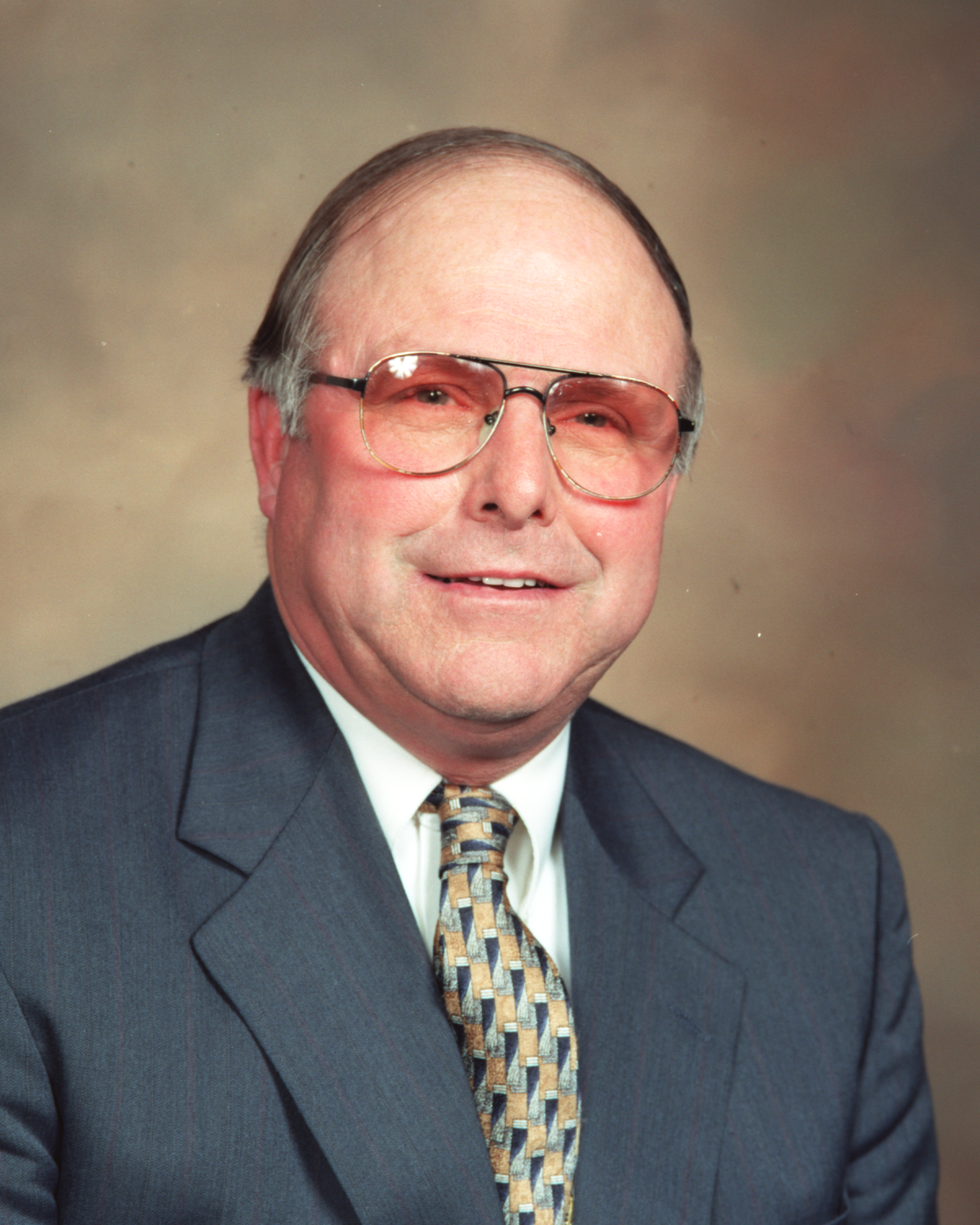

Member of the Iowa House of Representatives from the 71st district 95th (1999 – 2003)
- In office January 11, 1999 – 2012
- Preceded by: Harold van Maanen

Personal details
- Born: September 8, 1943 Oskaloosa, Iowa, United States
- Died: September 20, 2021 (aged 78)
- Party: Republican
- Spouse: Carol
- Children: Jeff
- Website: Van Engelenhoven's website

James L. Van Engelenhoven (September 8, 1943 – September 20, 2021) was an American politician, serving as the Iowa State Representative from the 71st District. He had served in the Iowa House of Representatives since 1999, when he was elected to represent the 95th district. In addition to winning re-election in general election challenges, Van Engelenhoven had won three primary elections (1998, 2008, and 2010), though he went one year (2004) without any primary or general election opponents.

As of September 2011, Van Engelenhoven served on several committees in the Iowa House, including the Ethics, Local Government, Natural Resources, and Transportation committees. His prior political experience included serving as County Supervisor in Mahaska County from 1992 to 1998. He died in 2021 at the age of 78.

== Electoral history ==
*incumbent

District 95 and early District 71 elections (1998 – 2004)

Election	Political result	Candidate	Party	Votes	%
Iowa House of Representatives primary elections, 1998; District 95; Turnout: 3,065	Republican	Jim Van Engelenhoven	Republican	1,348	44.0
Iowa House of Representatives primary elections, 1998; District 95; Turnout: 3,065	Republican	Marty Racheter	Republican	937	30.6
Iowa House of Representatives primary elections, 1998; District 95; Turnout: 3,065	Republican	Bill Augustine	Republican	742	24.2
Iowa House of Representatives elections, 1998; District 95; Turnout: 9,135	Republican hold	Jim Van Engelenhoven	Republican	6,015	65.8
Iowa House of Representatives elections, 1998; District 95; Turnout: 9,135	Republican hold	Nancy M. Van Zee	Democratic	2,960	32.4
Iowa House of Representatives elections, 1998; District 95; Turnout: 9,135	Republican hold	Gerald Sullivan	Reform	146	1.6
Iowa House of Representatives elections, 2000; District 95	Republican hold	James L. Van Engelenhoven*	Republican	unopposed	
Iowa House of Representatives elections, 2002; District 71; Turnout: 10,446	Republican (newly redistricted)	Jim Van Engelenhoven*	Republican	6,470	61.9
Iowa House of Representatives elections, 2002; District 71; Turnout: 10,446	Republican (newly redistricted)	Martin Duffy	Democratic	3,974	38.0
Iowa House of Representatives elections, 2004; District 71; Turnout: 937	Republican	Jim Van Engelenhoven*	Republican	776	82.8
Iowa House of Representatives elections, 2004; District 71; Turnout: 937	Republican	Donald Zoutte	Republican	161	17.2
Iowa House of Representatives elections, 2004; District 71	Republican hold	Jim Van Engelenhoven	Republican	unopposed	

Election	Political result	Candidate	Party	Votes	%
Iowa House of Representatives elections, 2006; District 71; Turnout: 11,490	Republican hold	Jim Van Engelenhoven*	Republican	6,587	57.3
Iowa House of Representatives elections, 2006; District 71; Turnout: 11,490	Republican hold	Catherine Haustein	Democratic	4,271	37.2
Iowa House of Representatives elections, 2006; District 71; Turnout: 11,490	Republican hold	Steve Woody Fisher	Independent	324	2.8
Iowa House of Representatives primary elections, 2008; District 71; Turnout: 1,576	Republican	Jim Van Engelenhoven*	Republican	1,074	68.1
Iowa House of Representatives primary elections, 2008; District 71; Turnout: 1,576	Republican	Marc Held	Republican	410	26.0
Iowa House of Representatives elections, 2008; District 71; Turnout: 15,284	Republican hold	Jim Van Engelenhoven*	Republican	9,442	61.6
Iowa House of Representatives elections, 2008; District 71; Turnout: 15,284	Republican hold	Pat VanZante	Democratic	5,829	38.1
Iowa House of Representatives primary elections, 2010; District 71; Turnout: 3,436	Republican	Jim Van Engelenhoven*	Republican	2,455	71.4
Iowa House of Representatives primary elections, 2010; District 71; Turnout: 3,436	Republican	Marc Held	Republican	755	22.0
Iowa House of Representatives elections, 2010; District 71; Turnout: 12,270	Republican hold	Jim Van Engelenhoven*	Republican	8,285	67.5
Iowa House of Representatives elections, 2010; District 71; Turnout: 12,270	Republican hold	Pat VanZante	Democratic	3,640	29.7

Iowa House of Representatives
Preceded by Harold van Maanen	95th District; 1999 – 2003	Succeeded by Michael Reasoner
Preceded by Wayne Ford	71st District; 2003 – 2012	Succeeded by N/A
