= Gregory Hoversten =

American politician (born 1957)

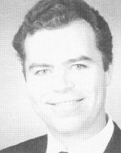

Member of the Iowa House of Representatives
- In office January 8, 2001 – January 12, 2003

Personal details
- Born: June 10, 1957 (age 69) United States
- Party: Republican
- Education: University of Iowa
- Occupation: doctor

Gregory Bernard Hoversten (born June 10, 1957) is an American politician in the state of Iowa.

Hoversten attended University of Osteopathic Medicine and Health Sciences as well as the University of Iowa. He is a family physician. A Republican, he served in the Iowa House of Representatives from 2001 to 2003 (1st district)
