= Iowa's 92nd House of Representatives district =

American legislative district

House District 92
- Type: District of the Lower house
- Location: Iowa
- Representative: Heather Hora
- Parent organization: Iowa General Assembly

The 92nd District of the Iowa House of Representatives in the state of Iowa. It is currently composed of Washington County, as well as part of Johnson County.

== Current elected officials ==
Heather Hora is the representative currently representing the district.

== Past representatives ==
The district has previously been represented by:

- William R. Monroe, 1971–1973
- James Middleswart, 1973–1979
- Douglas Shull, 1979–1983
- Horace Daggett, 1983–1993
- Keith Kreiman, 1993–2003
- Philip Wise, 2003–2009
- Jerry Kearns, 2009–2013
- Frank Wood, 2013–2015
- Ross Paustian, 2015–2023
- Heather Hora, 2023–present
