= Bob Hager (politician) =

American politician (1961–2025)

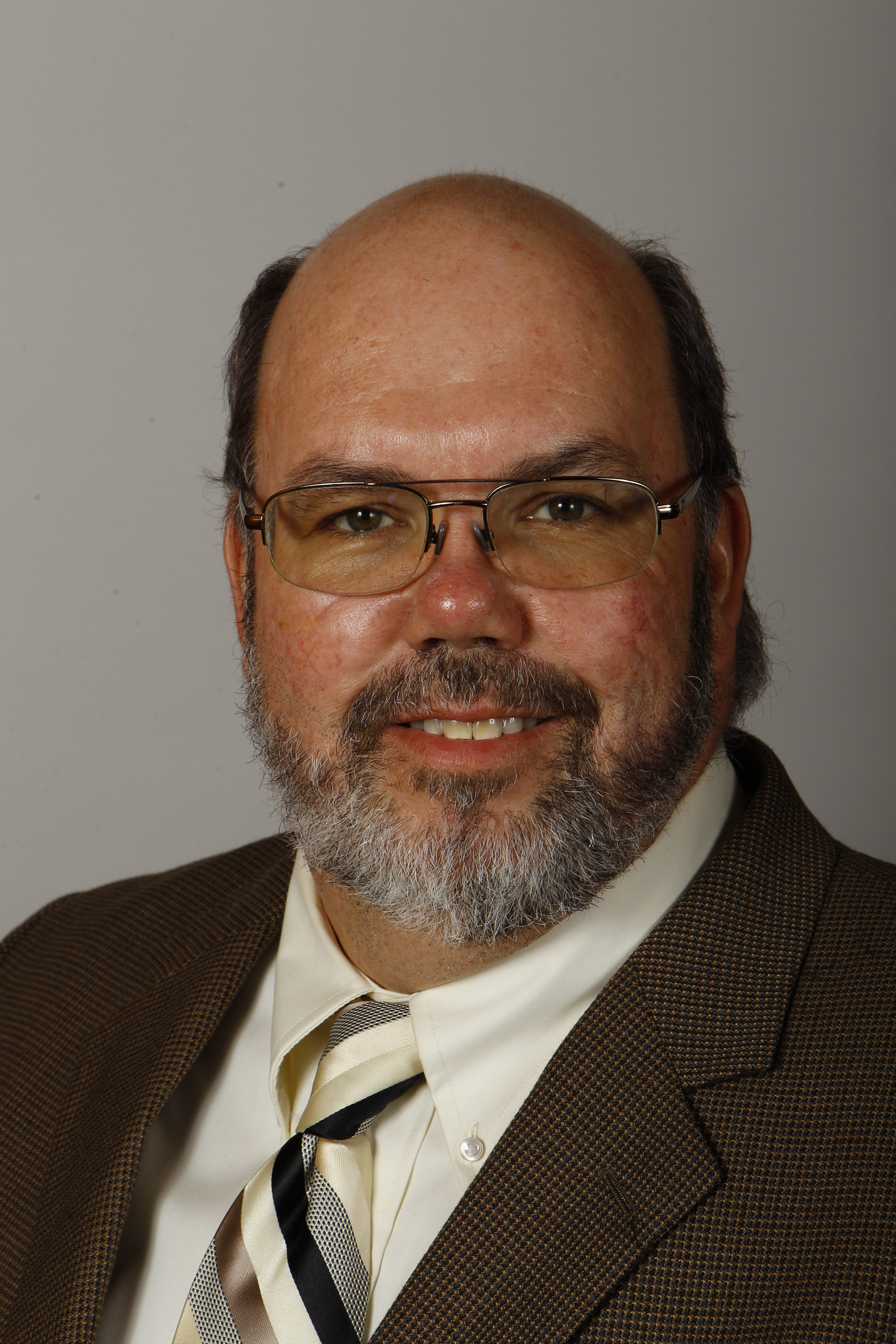

Member of the Iowa House of Representatives from the 16th district
- In office 2011–2013

Personal details
- Born: May 24, 1961 Waukon, Iowa, U.S.
- Died: February 5, 2025 (aged 63) Waukon, Iowa, U.S.
- Party: Republican

Robert Allen Hager (May 24, 1961 – February 5, 2025) was an American politician who served as a Republican party member of the Iowa House of Representatives, representing District 16 from 2011 to 2013.

During his legislative session, Hager served on the following committees:

- Economic Growth/Rebuild Iowa
- Environmental Protection, Vice Chair
- Local Government
- Natural Resources
- Subcommittee on Economic Development (Joint Appropriations)

Hager was a Roman Catholic and a small business owner. Together with his wife, Kristi, he owned and operated Upper Iowa Resort & Rental, a resort and camping operation near Dorchester, IA. They also ran Living Stone, a Waukon-area nonprofit re-entry home for ex-cons, the homeless and other persons in need.

Aside from managing his businesses, Hager sat on the Allamakee Community School District Board of Education from 2004 to 2010.

Hager died in Waukon, Iowa, on February 5, 2025, at the age of 63.

== Sources ==
- Iowa Republicans bio of Hager
- Iowa legislature bio of Hager
