= Dave Williams (Iowa politician) =

American politician

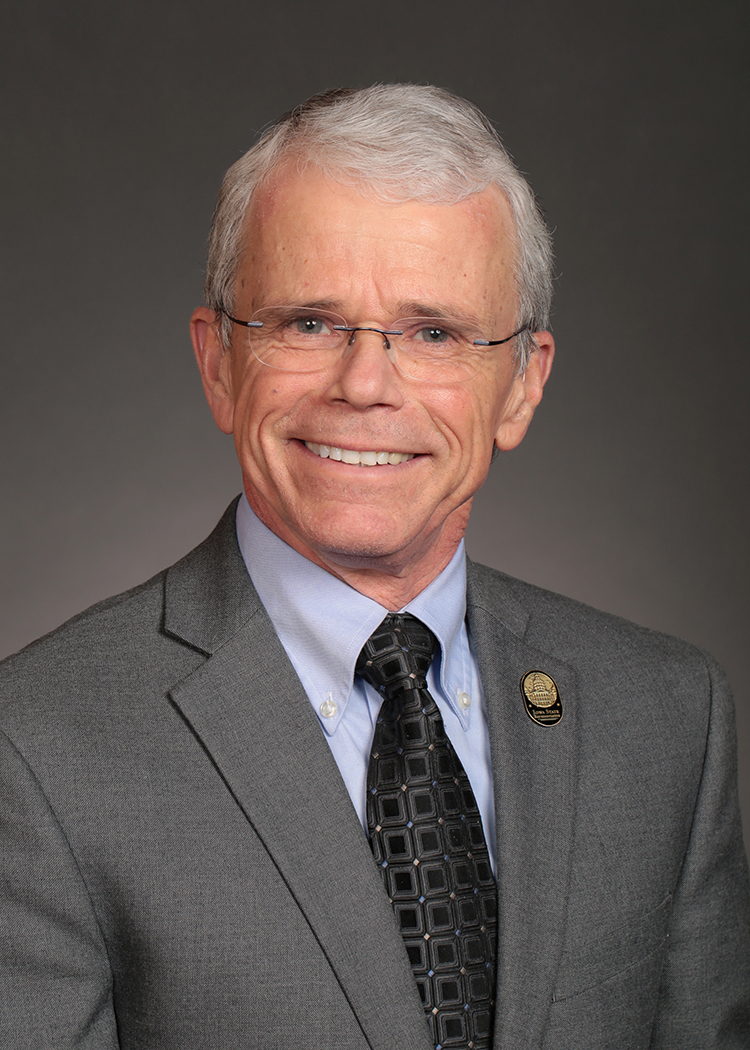
- Official portrait, 2019

Member of the Iowa House of Representatives from the 60th district
- In office January 14, 2019 – January 9, 2023
- Preceded by: Walt Rogers
- Succeeded by: Jane Bloomingdale (redistricting)

Personal details
- Born: Iowa, U.S.
- Party: Democratic
- Education: Iowa State University (BS); University of Iowa (MBA)

Dave Williams is an American politician, retired engineer, and businessman who served as a member of the Iowa House of Representatives from the 60th district. Elected in 2018, he assumed office on January 14, 2019.

== Early life and education ==
Williams was born and raised in Iowa. The first in his family to attend a four-year university, he earned a Bachelor of Science degree in mechanical engineering from Iowa State University and a Master of Business Administration from University of Iowa.

== Career ==
Williams worked as an engineer at John Deere for 36 years, but was forced to retire after an injury. Williams later founded a small business and worked as an adjunct professor of business at the University of Northern Iowa.
