= Jeremy Taylor (politician) =

American politician

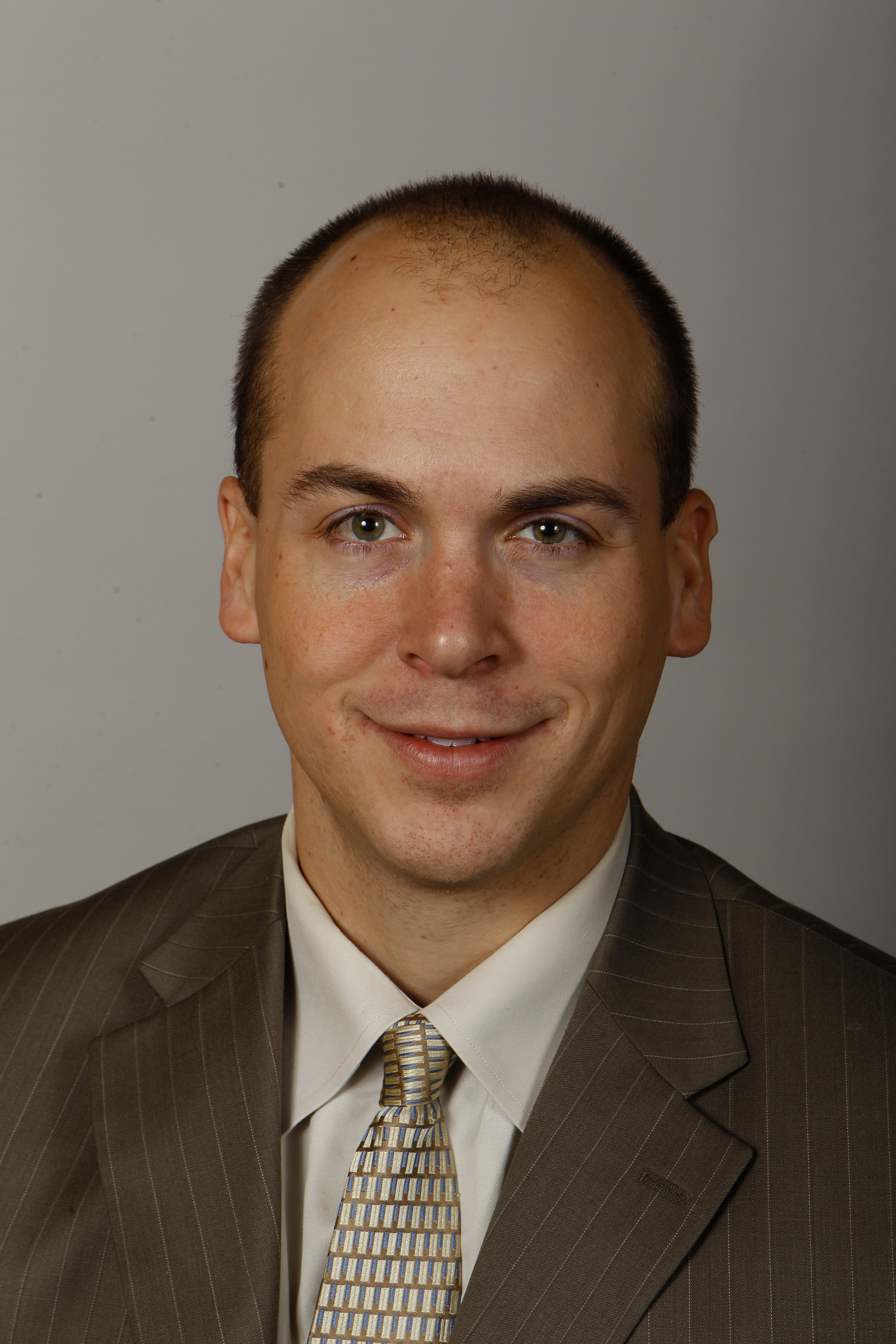

Member of the Iowa House of Representatives from the 1st district
- In office January 10, 2011 – January 14, 2013
- Preceded by: Wes Whitead
- Succeeded by: Jeff Smith

Woodbury County Supervisor
- In office 2014 – January 2020
- Succeeded by: Justin Wright
- Constituency: District 2

Personal details
- Born: April 19, 1978 (age 48) Sioux City, Iowa
- Education: Cochise College; Dowling College; University of South Dakota; Liberty University

Jeremy J. Taylor (born April 18, 1978) is an American educator and Republican politician. He served a single term on the Iowa House of Representatives from 2011 to 2013, and was a member of the Woodbury County Board of Supervisors between 2014 and 2020.

== Early life and career ==
Taylor was born in 1978, in Sioux City, Iowa, and attended West High School. Taylor earned an associates degree from Cochise College in intelligence operations. He studied English at Dowling College, and the University of South Dakota, where he completed a bachelor's and master's degree, respectively. He also obtained a master's of divinity from Liberty University. Taylor met his wife, Kim while teaching in Vietnam. They returned to Sioux City, where Taylor taught at North High School for nine years, before serving as the energy expert for the Sioux City Community School District.

== Political career ==
Taylor contested his first state legislative election in 2008, and was defeated. He mounted a second campaign in 2010, and won. Redistricting changed the borders of his district prior to the 2012 election, and he lost reelection. Taylor won a seat on the Woodbury County Board of Supervisors in 2014, and won a second term in 2018.

Taylor's residency and voter registration was challenged in December 2019 by Maria Rundquist, as he had acquired a second home in May 2019. To represent population-based electoral districts in Iowa, the officeholder must live in that district. When the officeholder moves into another district, their office is, by Iowa state law, vacant. Woodbury County auditor Pat Gill disqualified Taylor from his seat in District 2, and Taylor subsequently resigned the position.

Taylor remained a candidate for the Republican primary for the United States House of Representatives in Iowa's 4th congressional district, a seat held by Steve King. The primary was won by Randy Feenstra.

On January 12, 2023, the United States Department of Justice announced the arrest and indictment of Taylor’s wife, Kim Phuong Taylor, on charges of voter fraud in relation to Taylor’s unsuccessful candidacy in 2020 for the Republican primary and his successful candidacy for Woodbury County Supervisor. The DOJ alleges that Kim Taylor “submitted or caused others to submit dozens of voter registrations, absentee ballot request forms, and absentee ballots containing false information,” including by signing affirmations on absentee ballots and voter registrations on behalf of the named voters without their permission. In November 2023, Kim Phuong Taylor was found guilty of 52 counts of voter fraud, and was sentenced in April 2024 to four months in prison, along with four months of house arrest, followed by two years of supervised release.

== Sources ==
- Iowa Republican caucus bio of Taylor
- Iowa legislature bio of Taylor
