= Wayne Ford (politician) =

American politician (born 1951)

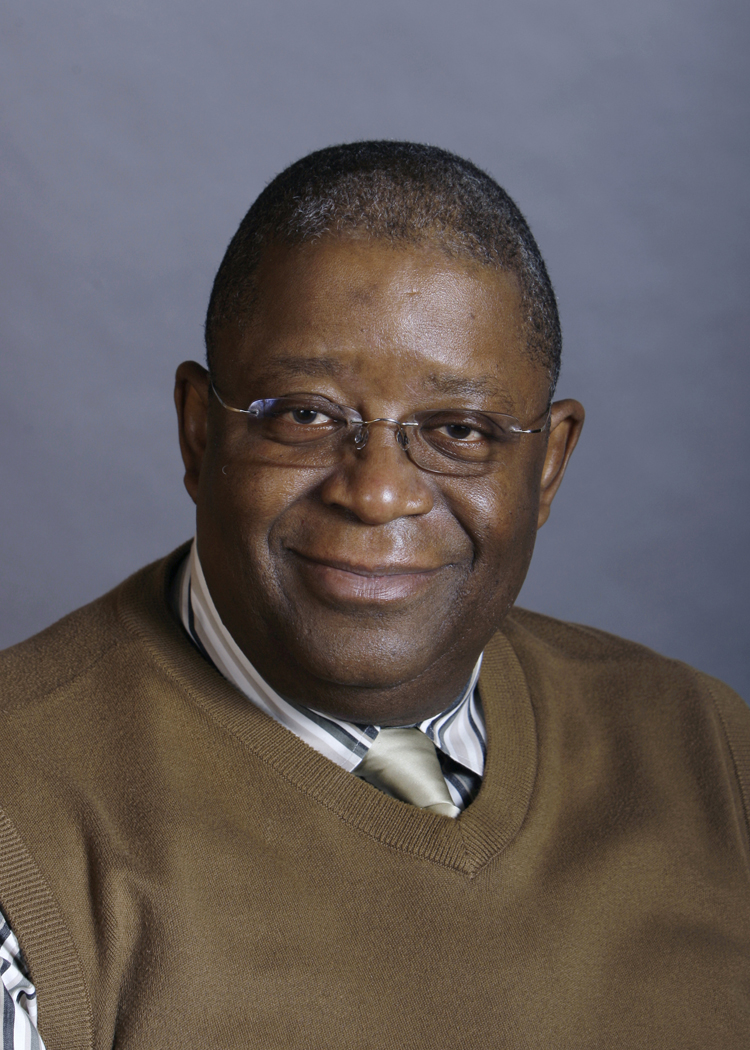

Member of the Iowa House of Representatives from the 65th district
- In office January 2003 – January 2011
- Preceded by: Carmine Boal
- Succeeded by: Anesa Kajtazović

Member of the Iowa House of Representatives from the 65th district
- In office January 1997 – January 2003
- Preceded by: ???
- Succeeded by: Jim Van Engelenhoven

Personal details
- Born: December 21, 1951 (age 74) Washington, D.C., U.S.
- Party: Democratic
- Education: Rochester Community and Technical College; Drake University (BA)

Wayne W. Ford (born December 21, 1951) is the Iowa State Representative from the 65th District. He has served in the Iowa House of Representatives since 1997.

== Early life and education ==
Ford was born in Washington, D.C. in 1951 and grew up living in Washington's inner city. He graduated from Ballou High School. After high school, he received a football scholarship to play at Rochester Junior College in Minnesota. In 1974, he obtained his bachelor's degree in Education from Drake University where he played on a football scholarship.

== Career ==
Ford currently serves on several committees in the Iowa House - the Appropriations committee; the Economic Growth committee; the Human Resources committee; and the Government Oversight committee, where he is vice chair.

Ford was re-elected in 2006 with 5,405 votes, running unopposed. Ford also owns and operates his own consulting firm, Wayne Ford & Associates.

== Organizations ==
- Founder of Brown & Black Presidential Forum, 1984
- Founder of Urban Dreams, 1985

Iowa House of Representatives
Preceded by ???	Member of the Iowa House of Representatives from the 71st district 1997–2003	Succeeded by Jim Van Engelenhoven
Preceded by Carmine Boal	Member of the Iowa House of Representatives from the 65th district 2003–2011	Succeeded by Anesa Kajtazović
