= Robert Osterhaus =

American politician

Bob Osterhaus
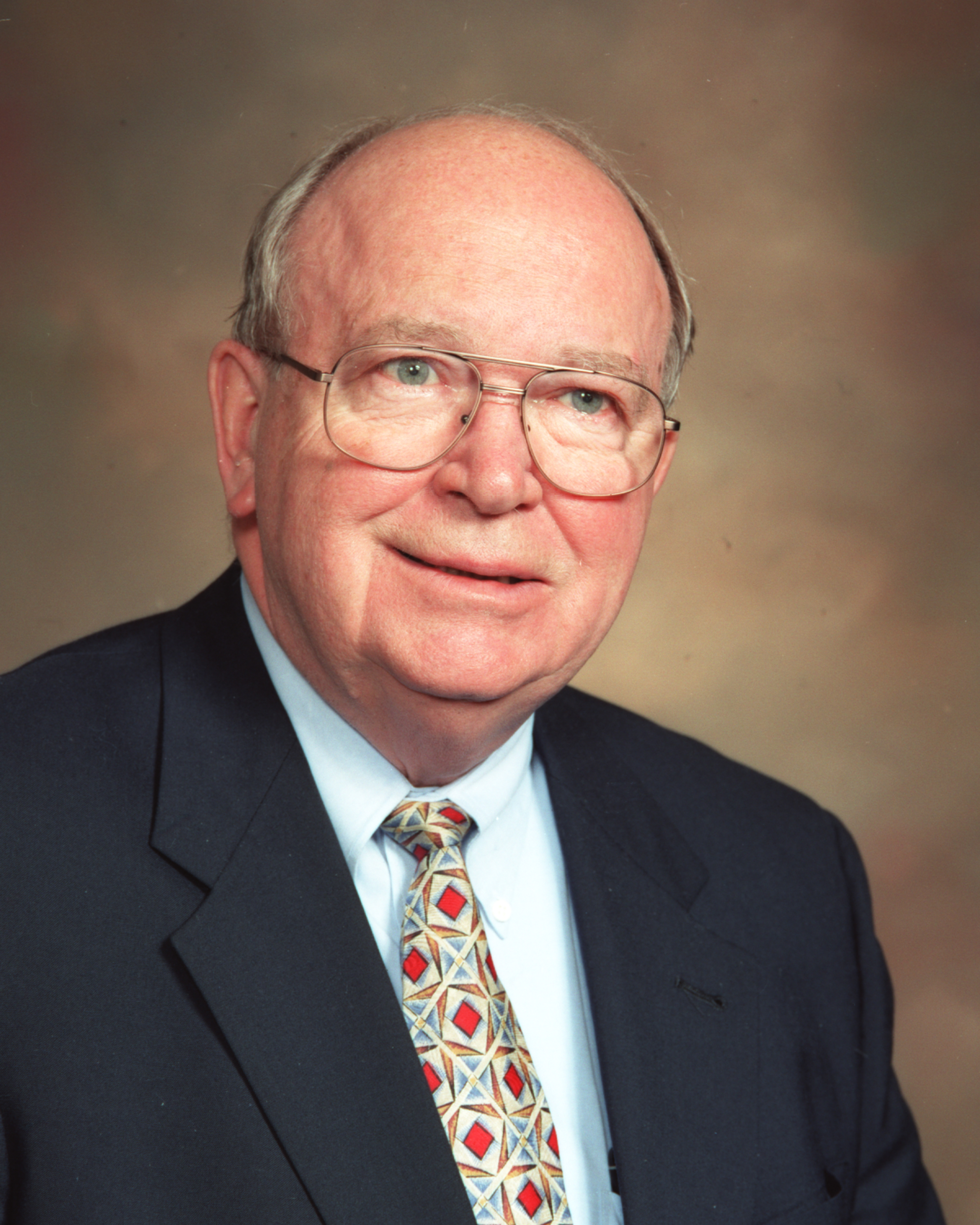

Member of the Iowa House of Representatives
- In office January 16, 1995 – January 9, 2005

Personal details
- Born: January 30, 1931 (age 95) Dyersville, Iowa, United States
- Party: Democrat
- Spouse: Ann Duhigg
- Children: ten
- Occupation: pharmacist

Robert J. Osterhaus (born January 30, 1931) is an American politician in the state of Iowa.

Osterhaus was born in Dyersville, Iowa. He attended the University of Iowa and is a pharmacist. A Democrat, he served in the Iowa House of Representatives from 1995 to 2005 (34th district from 1995 to 2003 and 25th district from 2003 to 2005).
