= Ross Paustian =

American politician (born 1956)

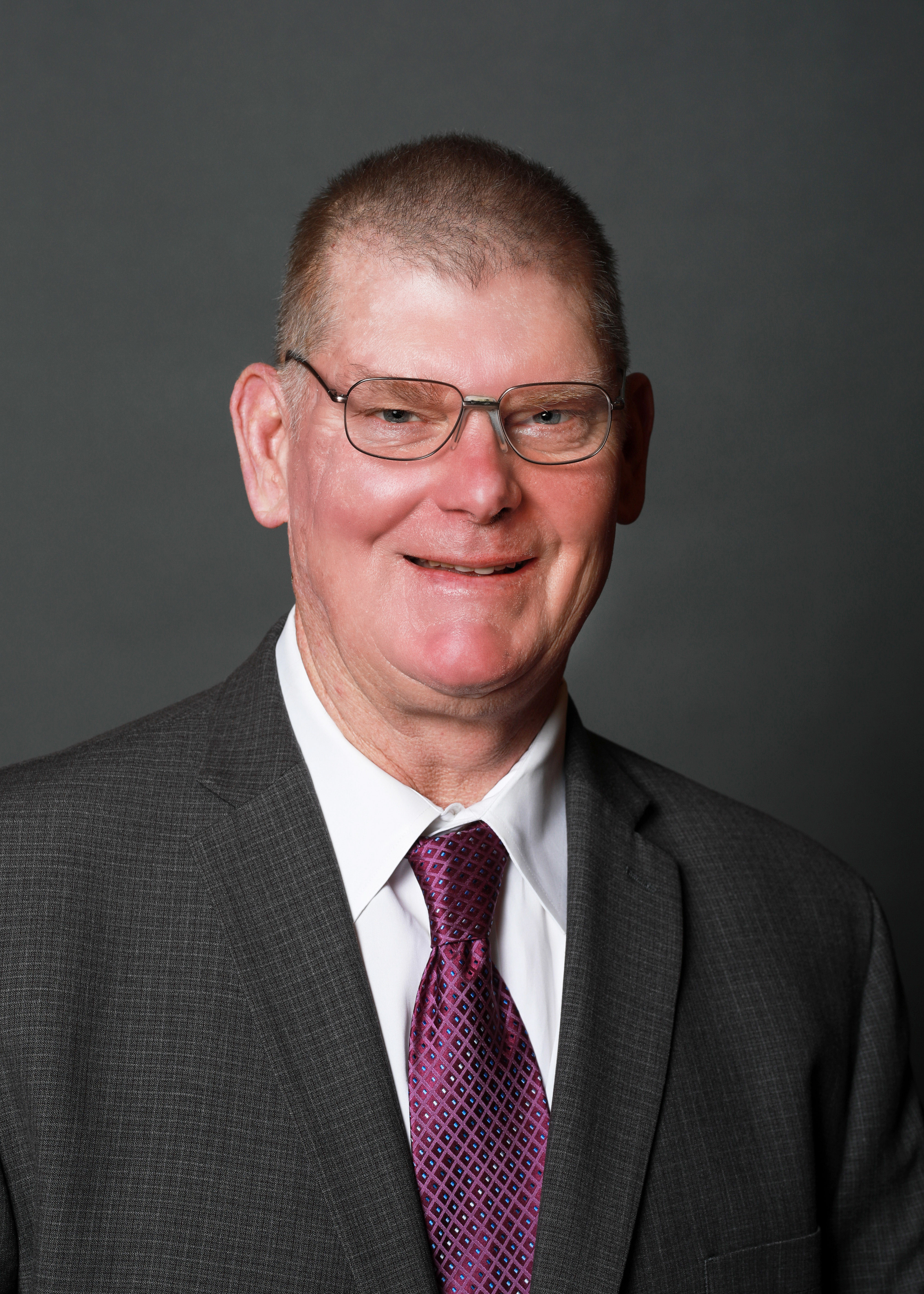

Member of the Iowa House of Representatives from the 92nd district
- In office January 12, 2015 – January 8, 2023
- Preceded by: Frank Wood
- Succeeded by: Heather Hora

Member of the Iowa House of Representatives from the 84th district
- In office January 11, 2011 – January 13, 2013
- Preceded by: Elesha L. Gayman
- Succeeded by: Dave Heaton

Personal details
- Born: March 3, 1956 (age 70) Davenport, Iowa, U.S.
- Spouse: Carol Paustian
- Children: 2
- Education: South Dakota State University
- Occupation: Farmer, politician

Ross C. Paustian (born March 3, 1956) is an American politician and a farmer from Iowa. Paustian is a former Republican member of the Iowa House of Representatives, representing District 92 from 2015 to 2023.

== Early life ==
On March 3, 1956, Paustian was born in Davenport, Iowa. Paustian's brother is Kent Paustian.

== Education ==
In 1978, Paustian earned a Bachelors of Science degree in Animal Science from South Dakota State University.

== Career ==
Paustian is a crop and livestock farmer.

On November 2, 2010, Paustian won the election and became a Republican member of Iowa House of Representatives for District 84. Paustian defeated Sheri L. Carnahan.

On November 6, 2012 Paustian was defeated by Frank D. Wood and lost his seat for District 92 with 47.6% of the votes.

On November 4, 2014, Paustian won the election and became a Republican member of the Iowa House of Representatives for District 92. Paustian defeated incumbent Frank D. Wood. On November 8, 2016, as an incumbent, Paustian won the election and continued serving District 92. Paustian defeated Ken Krumwiede with 56.13% of the votes. On November 6, 2018, as an incumbent, Paustian won the election and continued serving District 92. Paustian defeated Jean Simpson and other write-in with 52.5% of the votes.

Paustian is the chairman of the Agriculture Committee.

== Awards ==
- 2015 Wergin Good Farm Neighbor award. Presented to the Paustian family by Iowa Secretary of Agriculture Bill Northey. (August 5, 2015).

== Personal life ==
Paustian's wife is Carol. They have two children, Jennifer and Thomas.
