= Doris Kelley =

American politician

Doris J. Kelley
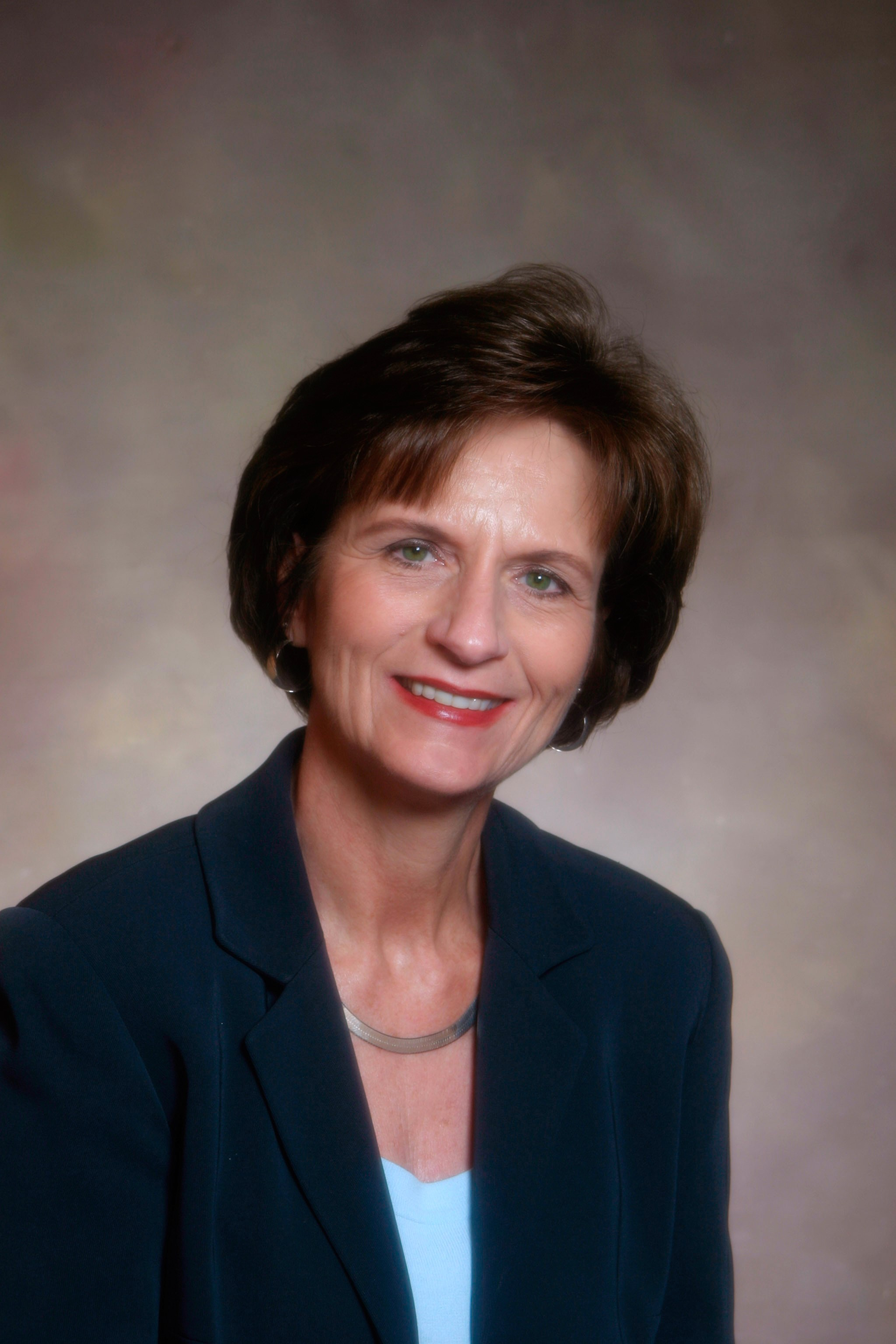

Member of the Iowa House of Representatives from the 20th district
- In office 2007–2011
- Preceded by: Willard Jenkins
- Succeeded by: Walt Rogers

Personal details
- Party: Democratic
- Spouse: Steve Corbin
- Occupation: Telecommunications Consultant
- Website: Kelley's website

Doris J. Kelley is a former Iowa State Representative from the 20th District. She served in the Iowa House of Representatives from 2007 to 2011.

Kelley served on several committees in the Iowa House – the Commerce committee; the Education committee; the Local Government committee; and the Ways and Means committee. She also served as vice-chair of the Administration and Regulation Appropriations Subcommittee.

Kelley was elected in 2006 with 6,344 votes (52%), defeating Republican opponent David Wieland.

In the November 2, 2010 general election, Kelley was defeated by Republican challenger Walt Rogers.

From 1995 to 2000, Kelley held the position of Chief Spokesperson/Marketing Director at Cedar Falls Utilities' Communications Utility. Throughout her career, she has also held notable roles such as Director of Business Development at Black and Veatch, Director of Consulting Services at DesignLiNC, Incorporated, and Telecommunications Coordinator at the Iowa Association of Municipal Utilities.

Kelley has a history of leadership roles, having served as the Past President of the Black Hawk Leadership Board of Directors and as a former director of the Cedar Falls Main Street Program.

Iowa House of Representatives
Preceded by Willard Jenkins	20th District; 2007–2011	Succeeded by Walt Rogers
