= Walt Rogers =

American politician (born 1961)

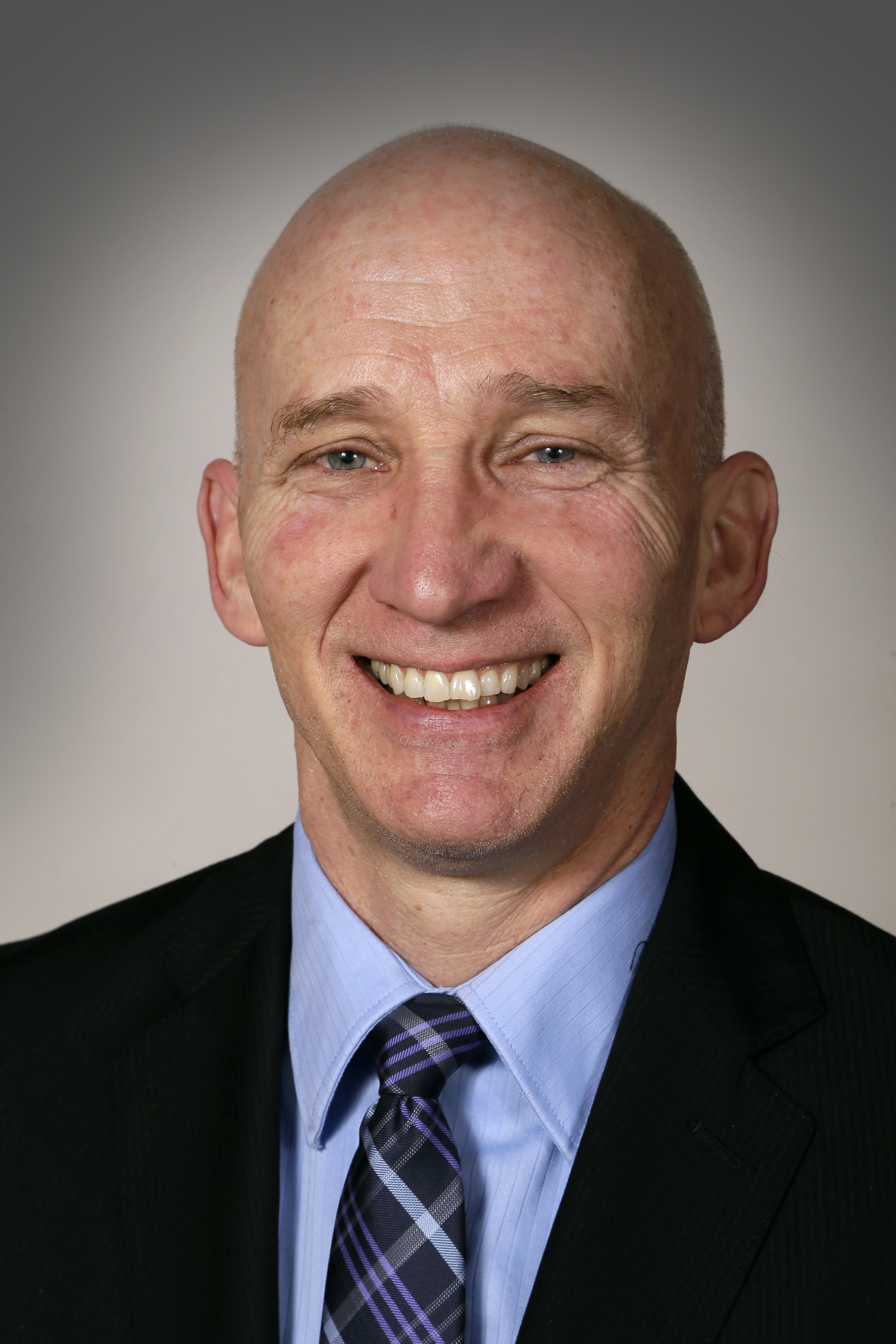

Member of the Iowa House of Representatives from the 60th district 20th district (2011–2013)
- In office January 10, 2011 – January 14, 2019
- Preceded by: Doris Kelley
- Succeeded by: Dave Williams

Personal details
- Born: July 5, 1961 (age 65) Waterloo, Iowa, U.S.
- Party: Republican
- Spouse: Jenny
- Children: 3 (all grown)
- Education: University of Northern Iowa
- Website: legis.iowa.gov/...

Walt Rogers (born July 5, 1961) is an American politician who served as a Republican Iowa State Representative from the 60th District from 2011 to 2019.

As of October 2011, Rogers serves on several committees in the Iowa House – the Appropriations, Judiciary, State Government, and Transportation committees. He also serves as the vice chair of the Administration and Regulation Appropriations Subcommittee and as a member of the Research and Development School Advisory Council.

On October 1, 2013, Rogers announced his candidacy for United States Congress in Iowa's 1st congressional district in the 2014 election cycle.

He was born and raised in Waterloo, Iowa.

== Electoral history ==
In his first campaign for public office, Rogers lost his 2008 election bid for the Iowa Senate's 10th District, losing to incumbent Democrat Jeff Danielson by a margin of only 22 votes. Rogers was elected in 2010, defeating incumbent Democrat Doris Kelley; he was reelected in 2012 over challenger Bob Greenwood.

Election	Political result	Candidate	Party	Votes	%
Iowa Senate elections, 2008; District 10; Turnout: 32,215	Democratic hold	Jeff Danielson*	Democratic	16,103	50.0
Iowa Senate elections, 2008; District 10; Turnout: 32,215	Democratic hold	Walt Rogers	Republican	16,081	49.9
Iowa House of Representatives elections, 2010; District 20; Turnout: 13,288	Republican gain from Democratic	Walt Rogers	Republican	6,997	52.7
Iowa House of Representatives elections, 2010; District 20; Turnout: 13,288	Republican gain from Democratic	Doris J. Kelley*	Democratic	6,031	45.4
Iowa House of Representatives elections, 2012; District 60; Turnout: 13,288	Republican hold	Walt Rogers*	Republican	8,966	51.9
Iowa House of Representatives elections, 2012; District 60; Turnout: 13,288	Republican hold	Bob Greenwood	Democratic	8,298	48.0

Iowa House of Representatives
Preceded by Doris Kelley	60th District (formerly 20th); 2011–present	Succeeded by Incumbent
