= Gene Blanshan =

American politician (born 1948)

Member of the Iowa House of Representatives from the 88th district
- In office January 10, 1983 – January 10, 1993
- Preceded by: George Swearingen
- Succeeded by: Horace Daggett

Personal details
- Born: December 16, 1948 (age 77) Boone, Iowa
- Party: Democratic

Eugene Henry "Gene" Blanshan (born December 16, 1948) is an American politician who served in the Iowa House of Representatives from the 88th district from 1983 to 1993.

== Personal life ==
Blanshan was born in Boone, Iowa, the son of Harold Irwin Blanshan (1916-2001) and Gladys Mildred Rueter Blanshan (1919-2004). His parents had married on April 20, 1941 in Grand Junction, Iowa. His father served in the United States Army Air Force during World War II.

Blanshan graduated from Morningside College in Sioux City, Iowa. He is a descendant of Louis DuBois (Huguenot) and the Hasbrouck family.
