= Dani Ollenburg =

American politician

Member of the Iowa House of Representatives from the 60th district
- Member-elect
- Assumed office January 1, 2027
- Preceded by: Jane Bloomingdale

Personal details
- Party: Republican
- Website: www.daniforiowahouse.com

Dani Ollenburg is an American politician. A member of the Republican Party, she was elected to the Iowa House of Representatives in 2026, representing the 60th district. She defeated fellow Republican Jane Bloomingdale in primary in the 2026 election.
