= Willard Jenkins =

American politician

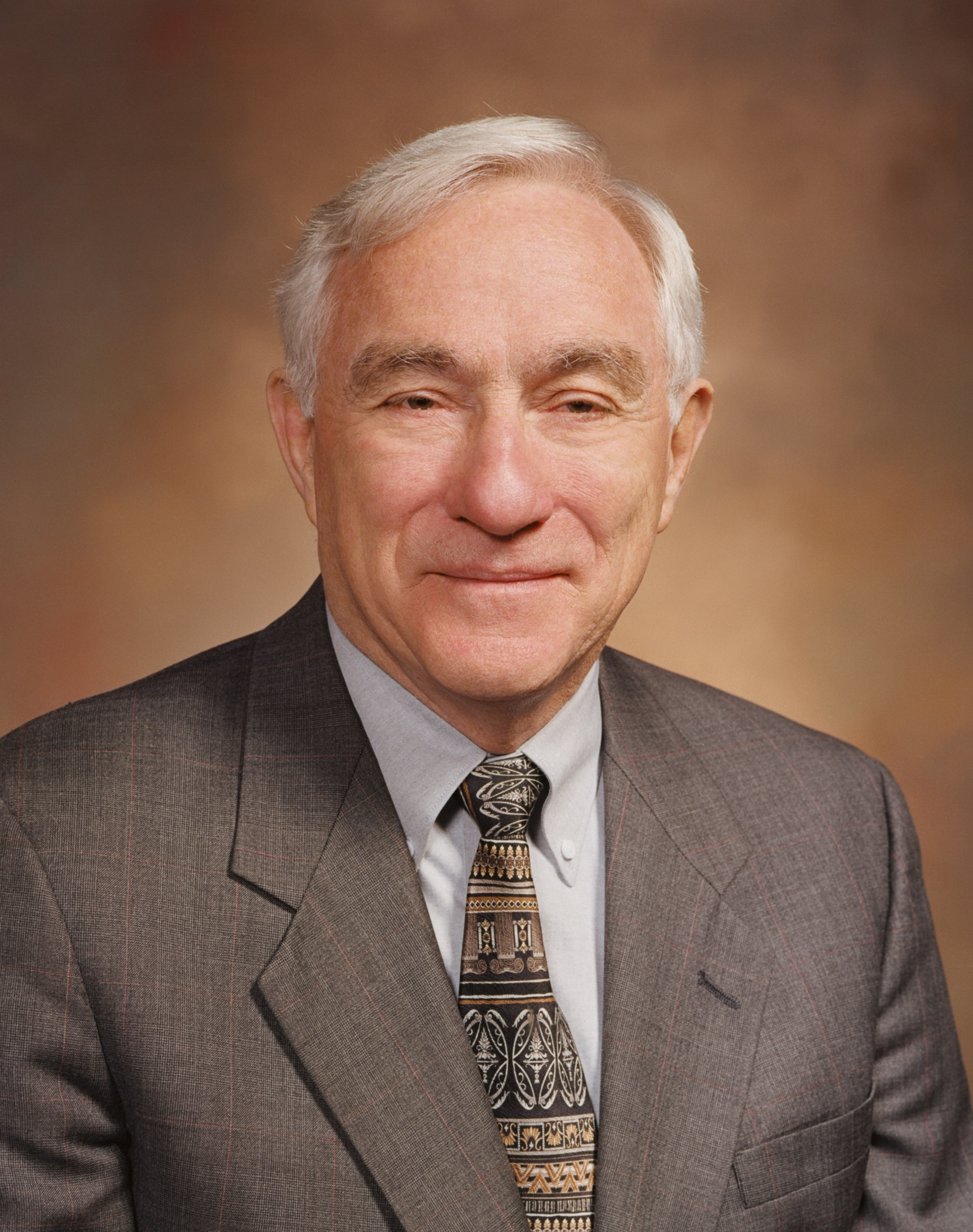

Member of the Iowa House of Representatives
- In office January 13, 1997 – January 7, 2007

Personal details
- Born: August 26, 1937 (age 88) Rosendale, Missouri, United States
- Party: Republican
- Spouse: Kay
- Children: four
- Occupation: engineer

G. Willard Jenkins (born August 26, 1937) is an American politician in the state of Iowa.

Jenkins was born in Rosendale, Missouri. He attended the University of Missouri at Rolla and University of Iowa and was an engineer. He worked for Deere & Co for 35 years in Moline, Illinois, Heidelberg, Germany and Waterloo, Iowa. A Republican, he served in the Iowa House of Representatives from 1997 to 2007 (24th district from 1997 to 2003 and 20th district 2003 to 2007).
