= 2024 Iowa House of Representatives election =

- November 5, 2024

All 100 seats in the Iowa House of Representatives 51 seats needed for a majority
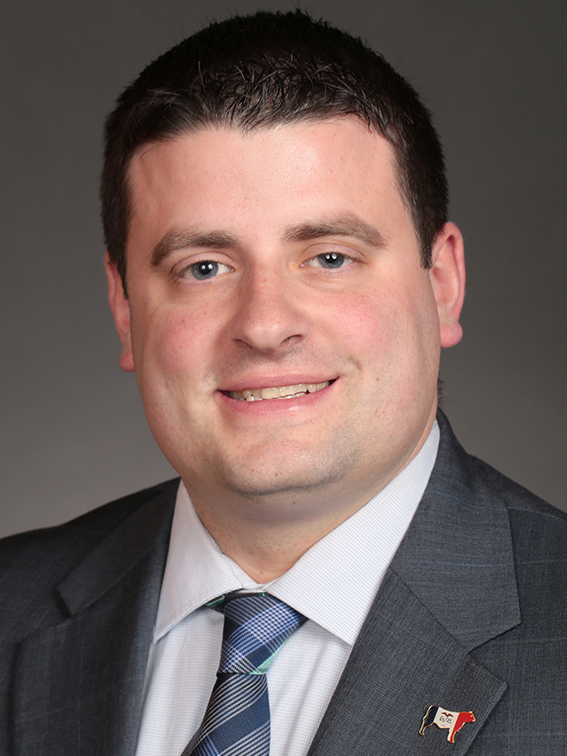

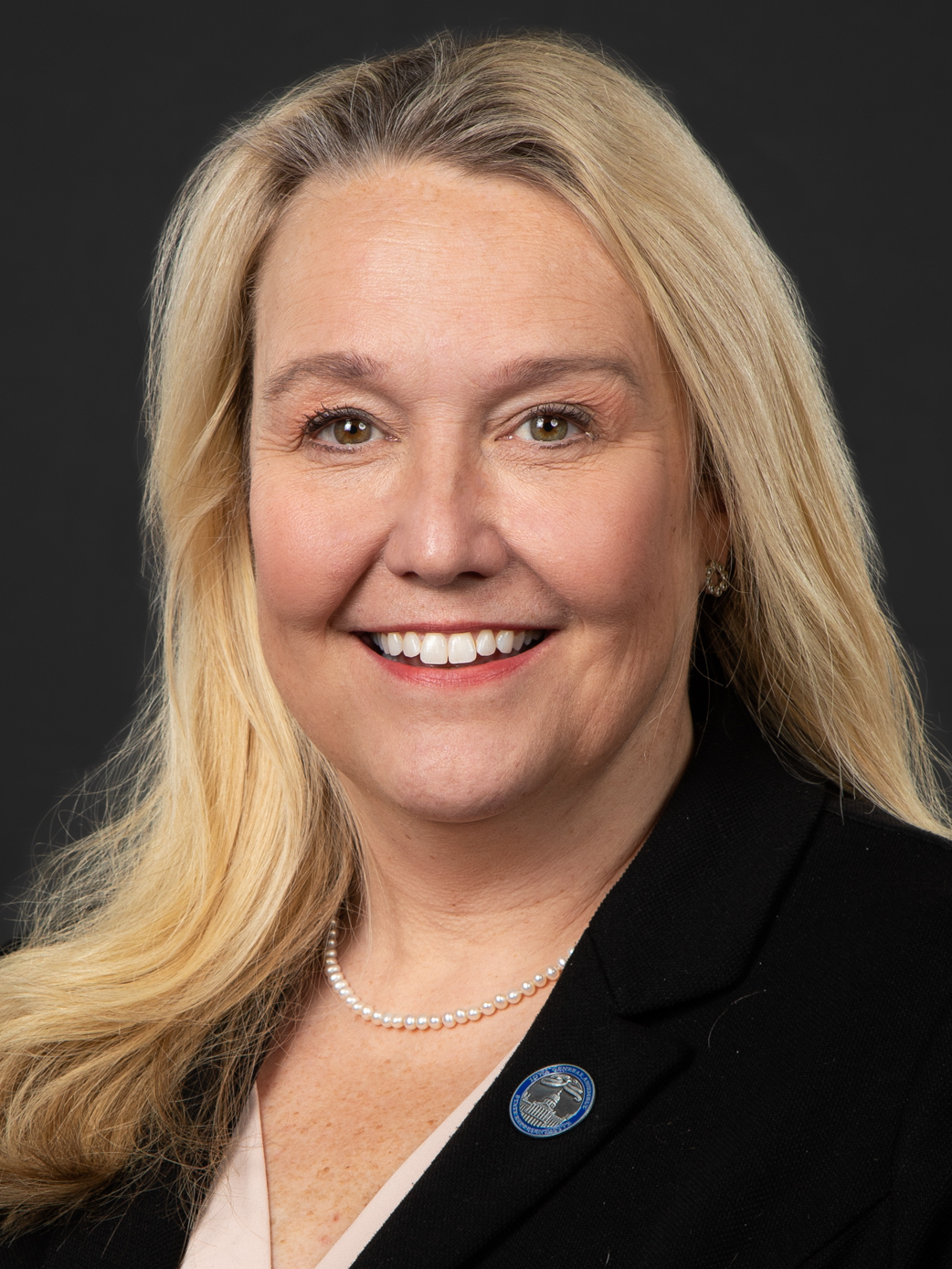
	Majority party	Minority party
Leader	Pat Grassley	Jennifer Konfrst
Party	Republican	Democratic
Leader since	January 13, 2020	June 14, 2019
Leader's seat	57th district	32nd district
Last election	64 seats, 56.59%	36 seats, 39.88%
Seats won	67	33
Seat change	▲3	▼3
Popular vote	808,492	625,834
Percentage	54.57%	42.23%
Swing	▼2.02%	▲2.35%
- Republican gain Democratic gain Republican hold Democratic hold 50–60% 60–70% 70–80% 80–90% >90% 50–60% 60–70% 70–80% >90%
Speaker of the House before election
Pat Grassley
Republican
Elected Speaker of the House
Pat Grassley
Republican

The 2024 Iowa House of Representatives election was held in the U.S. state of Iowa on November 5, 2024, to elect members to the House of Representatives of the 91st Iowa General Assembly. Elections were held concurrently with the 2024 United States elections.

Primaries were held on June 4, 2024.

== Partisan background ==
In the 2020 Presidential Election, Donald Trump won 64 House districts, while Joe Biden won in 36. Going into the 2024 Iowa House election, Republicans hold three districts where Biden won in 2020: District 28 (Biden +1%), District 43 (Biden +6%), and District 81 (Biden +9%). Conversely, Democrats hold three districts where Trump won: District 20 (Trump +4%), District 41 (Trump +2%), and District 42 (Trump +1%).

2020 Presidential data by House district: Trump: 40–50% 50–60%; 60–70%; 70–80%; 80–90%; Biden: 40–50%; 50–60%; 60–70%; 70–80%

== Retirements ==
=== Democrats ===
- District 34: Ako Abdul-Samad retired.
- District 44: John Forbes retired to run for Polk County Board of Supervisors.
- District 59: Sharon Steckman retired.
- District 80: Art Staed retired to run for Iowa Senate.

=== Republicans ===
- District 11: Brian Best retired.
- District 13: Ken Carlson retired.
- District 22: Stan Gustafson retired.
- District 24: Joel Fry retired.
- District 48: Phil Thompson retired.
- District 51: Dave Deyoe retired.
- District 64: Anne Osmundson retired.
- District 81: Luana Stoltenberg retired.
- District 91: Brad Sherman retired.

== Incumbents defeated ==
=== In the general election ===
1. District 41: Democrat Molly Buck lost to Republican challenger Ryan Weldon.
2. District 52: Democrat Sue Cahill lost to Republican challenger David Blom.
3. District 72: Democrat Charles Isenhart lost to Republican challenger Jennifer Smith.

== Predictions ==
Source	Ranking	As of
CNalysis	Solid R	March 26, 2024

== Closest races ==
Seats where the margin of victory was under 10%:

1. District 98, 0.34%
2. District 41, 0.65% gain
3. District 42, 0.83%
4. District 40, 1.86%
5. District 59, 2.35% gain
6. District 43, 3.39%
7. District 52, 4.62% gain
8. District 80, 4.78%
9. District 20, 5%
10. District 72, 6.59% gain
11. District 28, 6.6%
12. District 1, 6.93%
13. District 39, 9.4%
14. District 91, 9.7%

== Detailed results ==
=== District 1 ===
2024 Iowa House of Representatives election, 1st District
Party	Candidate	Votes	%
Democratic	J. D. Scholten (Incumbent)	4,615	53.40
Republican	Josh Steinhoff	4,017	46.47
Write-in		11	0.13
Total votes		8,643	100.0
Democratic hold			

=== District 2 ===
2024 Iowa House of Representatives election, 2nd District
Party	Candidate	Votes	%
Republican	Robert Henderson (incumbent)	7,130	60.62
Democratic	Jessica Lopez-Walker	4,613	39.22
Write-in		18	0.15
Total votes		11,761	100.0
Republican hold			

=== District 3 ===
2024 Iowa House of Representatives election, 3rd District
Party	Candidate	Votes	%
Republican	Thomas Jeneary (incumbent)	12,012	78.65
Democratic	Emma Bouza	3,236	21.19
Write-in		24	0.16
Total votes		15,272	100.0
Republican hold			

=== District 4 ===
2024 Iowa House of Representatives election, 4th District
Party	Candidate	Votes	%
Republican	Skyler Wheeler (Incumbent)	14,292	98.13
Write-in		272	1.87
Total votes		14,564	100.0
Republican hold			

=== District 5 ===
2024 Iowa House of Representatives election, 5th District
Party	Candidate	Votes	%
Republican	Zach Dieken (Incumbent)	11,146	77.85
Independent	Michael Schnoes	3,136	21.90
Write-in		36	0.25
Total votes		14,318	100.0
Republican hold			

=== District 6 ===
2024 Iowa House of Representatives election, 6th District
Party	Candidate	Votes	%
Republican	Megan Jones (Incumbent)	10,020	97.72
Write-in		234	2.28
Total votes		10,254	100.0
Republican hold			

=== District 7 ===
7th District Republican primary details

Republican Primary, 7th District
Party	Candidate	Votes	%
Republican	Mike Sexton (Incumbent)	1,373	50.85
Republican	Wendy Lou Larson	1,320	48.89
Write-in		7	0.26
Total votes		2,700	100.00

2024 Iowa House of Representatives election, 7th District
Party	Candidate	Votes	%
Republican	Mike Sexton (Incumbent)	12,743	83.43
Independent	Martin Podraza	2,465	16.14
Write-in		66	0.43
Total votes		15,274	100.0
Republican hold			

=== District 8 ===
2024 Iowa House of Representatives election, 8th District
Party	Candidate	Votes	%
Republican	Ann Meyer (Incumbent)	10,459	97.47
Write-in		272	2.53
Total votes		10,731	100.0
Republican hold			

=== District 9 ===
2024 Iowa House of Representatives election, 9th District
Party	Candidate	Votes	%
Republican	Henry Stone (incumbent)	11,744	73.24
Democratic	Christian He-Man Schlaerth	4,270	26.63
Write-in		21	0.13
Total votes		16,035	100.0
Republican hold			

=== District 10 ===
2024 Iowa House of Representatives election, 10th District
Party	Candidate	Votes	%
Republican	John Wills (Incumbent)	15,293	98.39
Write-in		251	1.61
Total votes		15,544	100.0
Republican hold			

=== District 11 ===
2024 Iowa House of Representatives election, 11th District
Party	Candidate	Votes	%
Republican	Craig Williams	11,381	72.38
Democratic	Jeff Rich	4,329	27.53
Write-in		14	0.09
Total votes		15,724	100.0
Republican hold			

=== District 12 ===
2024 Iowa House of Representatives election, 12th District
Party	Candidate	Votes	%
Republican	Steven Holt (Incumbent)	10,269	73.72
Democratic	Dustin Durbin	3,643	26.15
Write-in		18	0.13
Total votes		13,930	100.0
Republican hold			

=== District 13 ===
13th District Republican primary details

Republican Primary, 13th District
Party	Candidate	Votes	%
Republican	Travis Sitzmann	1,539	62.43
Republican	Noah Wieseler	910	36.92
Write-in		16	0.65
Total votes		2,465	100.00

2024 Iowa House of Representatives election, 13th District
Party	Candidate	Votes	%
Republican	Travis Sitzmann	12,462	73.07
Democratic	Rosanne Plante	3,192	18.72
Independent	Parker Hansen	1,370	8.03
Write-in		31	0.18
Total votes		17,055	100.0
Republican hold			

=== District 14 ===
2024 Iowa House of Representatives election, 14th District
Party	Candidate	Votes	%
Republican	Jacob Bossman (Incumbent)	11,116	97.50
Write-in		285	2.50
Total votes		11,401	100.0
Republican hold			

=== District 15 ===
2024 Iowa House of Representatives election, 15th District
Party	Candidate	Votes	%
Republican	Matt Windschitl (Incumbent)	12,795	69.23
Democratic	Benjamin Schauer	5,655	30.60
Write-in		31	0.17
Total votes		18,481	100.0
Republican hold			

=== District 16 ===
2024 Iowa House of Representatives election, 16th District
Party	Candidate	Votes	%
Republican	David Sieck (Incumbent)	12,876	74.98
Democratic	Candella Foley-Finchem	4,265	24.84
Write-in		31	0.18
Total votes		17,172	100.0
Republican hold			

=== District 17 ===
2024 Iowa House of Representatives election, 17th District
Party	Candidate	Votes	%
Republican	Devon Wood (Incumbent)	12,638	98.37
Write-in		209	1.63
Total votes		12,847	100.0
Republican hold			

=== District 18 ===
2024 Iowa House of Representatives election, 18th District
Party	Candidate	Votes	%
Republican	Thomas Moore (Incumbent)	11,165	73.70
Democratic	Tripp Narup	3,938	26.00
Write-in		46	0.30
Total votes		15,149	100.0
Republican hold			

=== District 19 ===
2024 Iowa House of Representatives election, 19th District
Party	Candidate	Votes	%
Republican	Brent Siegrist (Incumbent)	7,751	58.52
Democratic	Roger Petersen	5,469	41.29
Write-in		26	0.20
Total votes		13,246	100.0
Republican hold			

=== District 20 ===
20th District Republican primary details

Republican Primary, 20th District
Party	Candidate	Votes	%
Republican	James Wassell	219	59.84
Republican	August Gibbons	143	39.07
Write-in		4	1.09
Total votes		366	100.00

Results by precinct Turek: 50–60% Tie Wassell: 50–60%

2024 Iowa House of Representatives election, 20th District
Party	Candidate	Votes	%
Democratic	Josh Turek (Incumbent)	5,881	52.47
Republican	James Wassell	5,320	47.47
Write-in		7	0.06
Total votes		11,208	100.0
Democratic hold			

=== District 21 ===
2024 Iowa House of Representatives election, 21st District
Party	Candidate	Votes	%
Republican	Brooke Boden (Incumbent)	10,184	58.62
Democratic	Spencer A Waugh	7,166	41.25
Write-in		23	0.13
Total votes		17,373	100.0
Republican hold			

=== District 22 ===
22nd District Republican primary details

Republican Primary, 22nd District
Party	Candidate	Votes	%
Republican	Samantha Fett	1,218	55.11
Republican	Garrett Gobble	991	44.84
Write-in		1	0.05
Total votes		2,210	100.00

2024 Iowa House of Representatives election, 22nd District
Party	Candidate	Votes	%
Republican	Samantha Fett	11,861	59.23
Democratic	Rory D. Taylor	8,134	40.62
Write-in		30	0.15
Total votes		20,025	100.0
Republican hold			

=== District 23 ===
2024 Iowa House of Representatives election, 23rd District
Party	Candidate	Votes	%
Republican	Ray Sorensen (Incumbent)	12,837	72.07
Democratic	Karen Varley	4,939	27.73
Write-in		36	0.20
Total votes		17,812	100.0
Republican hold			

=== District 24 ===
24th District Republican primary details

Republican Primary, 24th District
Party	Candidate	Votes	%
Republican	Sam Wengryn	2,357	66.26
Republican	Brenda Brammer-Smith	1,188	33.40
Write-in		12	0.34
Total votes		3,557	100.00

2024 Iowa House of Representatives election, 24th District
Party	Candidate	Votes	%
Republican	Sam Wengryn	9,901	66.86
Democratic	Sonya Hicks	4,873	32.91
Write-in		35	0.24
Total votes		14,809	100.0
Republican hold			

=== District 25 ===
2024 Iowa House of Representatives election, 25th District
Party	Candidate	Votes	%
Republican	Hans Wilz (Incumbent)	7,972	64.79
Democratic	Brenda Curran	4,321	35.12
Write-in		12	0.10
Total votes		12,305	100.0
Republican hold			

=== District 26 ===
2024 Iowa House of Representatives election, 26th District
Party	Candidate	Votes	%
Republican	Austin Harris (Incumbent)	10,843	71.49
Democratic	Darcie Whitlow	3,658	24.12
Libertarian	Donald Gier	634	4.18
Write-in		32	0.21
Total votes		12,305	100.00
Republican hold			

=== District 27 ===
2024 Iowa House of Representatives election, 27th District
Party	Candidate	Votes	%
Democratic	Kenan Judge (Incumbent)	11,886	55.72
Republican	Oliver Bardwell	9,429	44.20
Write-in		18	0.08
Total votes		21,333	100.0
Democratic hold			

=== District 28 ===
28th District Republican primary details

Republican Primary, 28th District
Party	Candidate	Votes	%
Republican	David Young (Incumbent)	813	88.57
Republican	Chad Brewbaker	99	10.78
Write-in		6	0.65
Total votes		918	100.00

2024 Iowa House of Representatives election, 28th District
Party	Candidate	Votes	%
Republican	David Young (Incumbent)	10,381	53.23
Democratic	Laura Snider	9,095	46.63
Write-in		27	0.14
Total votes		19,503	100.00
Republican hold			

=== District 29 ===
2024 Iowa House of Representatives election, 29th District
Party	Candidate	Votes	%
Democratic	Brian Meyer (Incumbent)	7,948	95.72
Write-in		355	4.28
Total votes		8,303	100.00
Democratic hold			

=== District 30 ===
2024 Iowa House of Representatives election, 30th District
Party	Candidate	Votes	%
Democratic	Megan Srinivas (Incumbent)	7,515	62.39
Republican	Jerry Cheevers	4,477	37.17
Write-in		53	0.40
Total votes		12,045	100.00
Democratic hold			

=== District 31 ===
2024 Iowa House of Representatives election, 31st District
Party	Candidate	Votes	%
Democratic	Mary Madison (Incumbent)	12,465	96.05
Write-in		513	3.95
Total votes		12,978	100.00
Democratic hold			

=== District 32 ===
2024 Iowa House of Representatives election, 32nd District
Party	Candidate	Votes	%
Democratic	Jennifer Konfrst (Incumbent)	11,837	95.95
Write-in		500	4.05
Total votes		12,337	100.00
Democratic hold			

=== District 33 ===
2024 Iowa House of Representatives election, 33rd District
Party	Candidate	Votes	%
Democratic	Ruth Ann Gaines (Incumbent)	7,058	75.13
Libertarian	Toya S. Johnson	2,181	23.21
Write-in		156	1.66
Total votes		9,395	100.00
Democratic hold			

=== District 34 ===
34th District Democratic primary details

Democratic Primary, 34th District
Party	Candidate	Votes	%
Democratic	Rob Johnson	759	42.71
Democratic	Samy El-Baroudi	712	40.07
Democratic	John R. Campbell Jr.	250	14.07
Democratic	Dudley Muhammad	56	3.15
Total votes		1,777	100.00

2024 Iowa House of Representatives election, 34th District
Party	Candidate	Votes	%
Democratic	Rob Johnson	7,783	76.45
Republican	Danielle Duggan	2,345	23.04
Write-in		52	0.51
Total votes		10,180	100.00
Democratic hold			

=== District 35 ===
35th District Republican primary details

Republican Primary, 35th District
Party	Candidate	Votes	%
Republican	Angela Kay Schreader	151	60.16
Republican	Daniel Schmude	95	37.85
Write-in		5	1.99
Total votes		251	100.00

2024 Iowa House of Representatives election, 35th District
Party	Candidate	Votes	%
Democratic	Sean Bagniewski (Incumbent)	10,574	66.40
Republican	Angela Kay Schreader	4,503	28.28
Libertarian	David G. Green	802	5.04
Write-in		45	0.28
Total votes		15,924	100.00
Democratic hold			

=== District 36 ===
2024 Iowa House of Representatives election, 36th District
Party	Candidate	Votes	%
Democratic	Austin Baeth (Incumbent)	13,031	97.64
Write-in		315	2.36
Total votes		13,346	100.00
Democratic hold			

=== District 37 ===
2024 Iowa House of Representatives election, 37th District
Party	Candidate	Votes	%
Republican	Barb McCulla (Incumbent)	14,955	98.30
Write-in		258	1.70
Total votes		15,213	100.00
Republican hold			

=== District 38 ===
2024 Iowa House of Representatives election, 38th District
Party	Candidate	Votes	%
Republican	Jon Dunwell (Incumbent)	9,035	55.75
Democratic	Brad Magg	7,164	44.20
Write-in		8	0.05
Total votes		16,207	100.00
Republican hold			

=== District 39 ===
2024 Iowa House of Representatives election, 39th District
Party	Candidate	Votes	%
Democratic	Rick Olson (Incumbent)	7,511	54.57
Republican	Troy Clark	6,217	45.17
Write-in		34	0.25
Total votes		13,763	100.00
Democratic hold			

=== District 40 ===
2024 Iowa House of Representatives election, 40th District
Party	Candidate	Votes	%
Republican	Bill Gustoff (Incumbent)	8,720	50.86
Democratic	Heather Sievers	8,402	49.00
Write-in		24	0.14
Total votes		17,146	100.00
Republican hold			

=== District 41 ===
41st District Republican primary details

Republican Primary, 41st District
Party	Candidate	Votes	%
Republican	Ryan Weldon	780	61.80
Republican	Matthew Smith	476	37.72
Write-in		6	0.48
Total votes		1,262	100.00

2024 Iowa House of Representatives election, 41st District
Party	Candidate	Votes	%
Republican	Ryan Weldon	10,707	50.25
Democratic	Molly Buck (Incumbent)	10,569	49.60
Write-in		33	0.15
Total votes		21,309	100.00
Republican gain from Democratic			

=== District 42 ===
2024 Iowa House of Representatives election, 42nd District
Party	Candidate	Votes	%
Democratic	Heather Matson (Incumbent)	9,108	50.34
Republican	Heather Stephenson	8,959	49.51
Write-in		27	0.15
Total votes		18,094	100.00
Democratic hold			

=== District 43 ===
2024 Iowa House of Representatives election, 43rd District
Party	Candidate	Votes	%
Republican	Eddie Andrews (Incumbent)	9,598	50.89
Democratic	Tiara Mays-Sims	8,959	47.50
Independent	Brett Harvey Nelson	280	1.48
Write-in		23	0.12
Total votes		18,860	100.00
Republican hold			

=== District 44 ===
44th District Democratic primary details

Democratic Primary, 44th District
Party	Candidate	Votes	%
Democratic	Larry McBurney	1,088	64.65
Democratic	Jason Menke	595	35.35
Total votes		1,683	100.00

2024 Iowa House of Representatives election, 44th District
Party	Candidate	Votes	%
Democratic	Larry McBurney	9,769	64.25
Libertarian	Jake Heard	5,313	34.94
Write-in		122	0.80
Total votes		15,204	100.00
Democratic hold			

=== District 45 ===
2024 Iowa House of Representatives election, 45th District
Party	Candidate	Votes	%
Republican	Brian Lohse (Incumbent)	12,827	64.57
Democratic	Anthony William Thompson	6,998	35.23
Write-in		40	0.20
Total votes		19,865	100.00
Republican hold			

=== District 46 ===
2024 Iowa House of Representatives election, 46th District
Party	Candidate	Votes	%
Republican	Dan Gehlbach (Incumbent)	10,868	55.11
Democratic	Lynne Campbell	8,834	44.79
Write-in		20	0.10
Total votes		19,722	100.00
Republican hold			

=== District 47 ===
2024 Iowa House of Representatives election, 47th District
Party	Candidate	Votes	%
Republican	Carter Nordman (Incumbent)	9,956	64.02
Democratic	Joe Shelly	5,570	35.82
Write-in		25	0.16
Total votes		15,551	100.00
Republican hold			

=== District 48 ===
2024 Iowa House of Representatives election, 48th District
Party	Candidate	Votes	%
Republican	Chad Behn	10,654	60.18
Democratic	Penny Vossler	7,022	39.66
Write-in		29	0.16
Total votes		17,705	100.00
Republican hold			

=== District 49 ===
2024 Iowa House of Representatives election, 49th District
Party	Candidate	Votes	%
Democratic	Beth Wessel-Kroeschell (Incumbent)	7,500	73.31
Libertarian	Eric Cooper	2,639	25.79
Write-in		92	0.90
Total votes		10,231	100.00
Democratic hold			

=== District 50 ===
2024 Iowa House of Representatives election, 50th District
Party	Candidate	Votes	%
Democratic	Ross Wilburn (Incumbent)	11,802	97.02
Write-in		363	2.98
Total votes		12,165	100.00
Democratic hold			

=== District 51 ===
51st District Republican primary details

Republican Primary, 51st District
Party	Candidate	Votes	%
Republican	Brett Barker	1,191	59.76
Republican	Martin Chitty	799	40.09
Write-in		3	0.15
Total votes		1,993	100.00

2024 Iowa House of Representatives election, 51st District
Party	Candidate	Votes	%
Republican	Brett Barker	11,275	62.55
Democratic	Ryan Condon	6,719	37.28
Write-in		31	0.17
Total votes		18,025	100.00
Republican hold			

=== District 52 ===
2024 Iowa House of Representatives election, 52nd District
Party	Candidate	Votes	%
Republican	David Blom	6,437	52.27
Democratic	Sue Cahill (Incumbent)	5,869	47.65
Write-in		10	0.08
Total votes		12,316	100.00
Republican gain from Democratic			

=== District 53 ===
53rd District Democratic primary details

Democratic Primary, 53rd District
Party	Candidate	Votes	%
Democratic	Tommy Hexter	486	58.84
Democratic	Jennifer Wrage	276	33.41
Democratic	John Anderson	63	7.63
Write-in		1	0.12
Total votes		826	100.00

2024 Iowa House of Representatives election, 53rd District
Party	Candidate	Votes	%
Republican	Dean Fisher (Incumbent)	8,889	56.77
Democratic	Tommy Hexter	6,745	43.08
Write-in		24	0.15
Total votes		15,658	100.00
Republican hold			

=== District 54 ===
54th District Republican primary details

Republican Primary, 54th District
Party	Candidate	Votes	%
Republican	Joshua Meggers (Incumbent)	1,219	76.18
Republican	Jody Anderson	378	23.63
Write-in		3	0.19
Total votes		1,600	100.00

2024 Iowa House of Representatives election, 54th District
Party	Candidate	Votes	%
Republican	Joshua Meggers (Incumbent)	13,435	98.45
Write-in		211	1.55
Total votes		13,646	100.00
Republican hold			

=== District 55 ===
2024 Iowa House of Representatives election, 55th District
Party	Candidate	Votes	%
Republican	Shannon Latham (Incumbent)	13,003	98.28
Write-in		228	1.72
Total votes		13,231	100.00
Republican hold			

=== District 56 ===
2024 Iowa House of Representatives election, 56th District
Party	Candidate	Votes	%
Republican	Mark Thompson (Incumbent)	11,167	74.12
Democratic	Kyle Kruse	3,876	25.73
Write-in		23	0.15
Total votes		15,066	100.00
Republican hold			

=== District 57 ===
2024 Iowa House of Representatives election, 57th District
Party	Candidate	Votes	%
Republican	Pat Grassley (Incumbent)	10,869	60.16
Democratic	Shawn Ellerbroek	7,180	39.74
Write-in		18	0.10
Total votes		18,067	100.00
Republican hold			

=== District 58 ===
2024 Iowa House of Representatives election, 58th District
Party	Candidate	Votes	%
Republican	Charley Thomson (Incumbent)	10,060	63.42
Democratic	Gail Allison	5,782	36.45
Write-in		21	0.13
Total votes		15,863	100.00
Republican hold			

=== District 59 ===
2024 Iowa House of Representatives election, 59th District
Party	Candidate	Votes	%
Republican	Christian Hermanson	8,069	51.13
Democratic	Jeremy True	7,698	48.78
Write-in		15	0.09
Total votes		15,782	100.00
Republican gain from Democratic			

=== District 60 ===
60th District Republican primary details

Republican Primary, 60th District
Party	Candidate	Votes	%
Republican	Jane Bloomingdale (Incumbent)	1,729	60.79
Republican	John Rosenfeld	1,112	39.10
Write-in		3	0.11
Total votes		2,844	100.00

2024 Iowa House of Representatives election, 60th District
Party	Candidate	Votes	%
Republican	Jane Bloomingdale (Incumbent)	14,459	98.37
Write-in		240	1.63
Total votes		14,699	100.00
Republican hold			

=== District 61 ===
2024 Iowa House of Representatives election, 61st District
Party	Candidate	Votes	%
Democratic	Timi Brown-Powers (Incumbent)	9,230	97.72
Write-in		215	2.28
Total votes		9,445	100.00
Democratic hold			

=== District 62 ===
2024 Iowa House of Representatives election, 62nd District
Party	Candidate	Votes	%
Democratic	Jerome Amos (Incumbent)	7,135	75.30
Libertarian	Ervin Sabic	2,273	23.99
Write-in		67	0.71
Total votes		9,475	100.00
Democratic hold			

=== District 63 ===
2024 Iowa House of Representatives election, 63rd District
Party	Candidate	Votes	%
Republican	Michael Bergan (Incumbent)	13,566	91.43
Write-in		1,272	8.57
Total votes		14,838	100.00
Republican hold			

=== District 64 ===
64th District Republican primary details

Republican Primary, 64th District
Party	Candidate	Votes	%
Republican	Jason Gearhart	1,905	55.00
Republican	Douglas Wolfe	1,551	44.77
Write-in		8	0.23
Total votes		3,464	100.00

2024 Iowa House of Representatives election, 64th District
Party	Candidate	Votes	%
Republican	Jason Gearhart	10,824	67.72
Independent	Ian Zahren	5,114	32.00
Write-in		45	0.28
Total votes		15,983	100.00
Republican hold			

=== District 65 ===
2024 Iowa House of Representatives election, 65th District
Party	Candidate	Votes	%
Republican	Shannon Lundgren (Incumbent)	11,934	64.24
Democratic	Carolyn Wiezorek	6,623	35.65
Write-in		20	0.11
Total votes		18,577	100.00
Republican hold			

=== District 66 ===
2024 Iowa House of Representatives election, 66th District
Party	Candidate	Votes	%
Republican	Steve Bradley (Incumbent)	9,541	55.39
Democratic	Andy McKean	7,670	44.53
Write-in		13	0.08
Total votes		17,224	100.00
Republican hold			

=== District 67 ===
2024 Iowa House of Representatives election, 67th District
Party	Candidate	Votes	%
Republican	Craig Johnson (Incumbent)	14,178	98.17
Write-in		265	1.83
Total votes		14,443	100.00
Republican hold			

=== District 68 ===
2024 Iowa House of Representatives election, 68th District
Party	Candidate	Votes	%
Republican	Chad Ingels (Incumbent)	10,355	67.21
Democratic	Tim O’Brien	5,037	32.70
Write-in		14	0.09
Total votes		15,406	100.00
Republican hold			

=== District 69 ===
2024 Iowa House of Representatives election, 69th District
Party	Candidate	Votes	%
Republican	Tom Determann (Incumbent)	8,568	57.00
Democratic	Randy Meier	6,454	42.94
Write-in		9	0.06
Total votes		15,031	100.00
Republican hold			

=== District 70 ===
2024 Iowa House of Representatives election, 70th District
Party	Candidate	Votes	%
Republican	Norlin Mommsen (Incumbent)	10,661	61.30
Democratic	Kay Pence	6,708	38.57
Write-in		22	0.13
Total votes		17,391	100.00
Republican hold			

=== District 71 ===
2024 Iowa House of Representatives election, 71st District
Party	Candidate	Votes	%
Democratic	Lindsay James (Incumbent)	7,971	56.09
Republican	James W. McClain	6,220	43.77
Write-in		21	0.15
Total votes		14,212	100.00
Democratic hold			

=== District 72 ===
72nd District Republican primary details

Republican Primary, 72nd District
Party	Candidate	Votes	%
Republican	Jennifer J. Smith	793	77.07
Republican	Rod Warnke	236	22.93
Total votes		1,029	100.00

2024 Iowa House of Representatives election, 72nd District
Party	Candidate	Votes	%
Republican	Jennifer Smith	8,575	53.21
Democratic	Charles Isenhart (Incumbent)	7,513	46.62
Write-in		26	0.16
Total votes		16,114	100.00
Republican gain from Democratic			

=== District 73 ===
2024 Iowa House of Representatives election, 73rd District
Party	Candidate	Votes	%
Democratic	Elizabeth Wilson (Incumbent)	12,213	95.51
Write-in		574	4.49
Total votes		12,787	100.00
Democratic hold			

=== District 74 ===
2024 Iowa House of Representatives election, 74th District
Party	Candidate	Votes	%
Democratic	Eric Gjerde (Incumbent)	11,368	96.38
Write-in		427	3.62
Total votes		11,795	100.00
Democratic hold			

=== District 75 ===
2024 Iowa House of Representatives election, 75th District
Party	Candidate	Votes	%
Democratic	Bob Kressig (Incumbent)	11,529	97.70
Write-in		271	2.30
Total votes		11,800	100.00
Democratic hold			

=== District 76 ===
2024 Iowa House of Representatives election, 76th District
Party	Candidate	Votes	%
Republican	Derek Wulf (Incumbent)	10,347	60.41
Democratic	Jarred Johnston	6,762	39.48
Write-in		19	0.11
Total votes		17,128	100.00
Republican hold			

=== District 77 ===
2024 Iowa House of Representatives election, 77th District
Party	Candidate	Votes	%
Democratic	Jeff Cooling (Incumbent)	9,523	96.65
Write-in		330	3.35
Total votes		9,853	100.00
Democratic hold			

=== District 78 ===
2024 Iowa House of Representatives election, 78th District
Party	Candidate	Votes	%
Democratic	Sami Scheetz (Incumbent)	10,803	96.73
Write-in		365	3.27
Total votes		11,168	100.00
Democratic hold			

=== District 79 ===
2024 Iowa House of Representatives election, 79th District
Party	Candidate	Votes	%
Democratic	Tracy Ehlert (Incumbent)	9,222	60.72
Republican	Barclay Woerner	5,947	39.16
Write-in		19	0.13
Total votes		15,188	100.00
Democratic hold			

=== District 80 ===
2024 Iowa House of Representatives election, 80th District
Party	Candidate	Votes	%
Democratic	Aime Wichtendahl	9,070	52.34
Republican	John Thompson	8,242	47.56
Write-in		17	0.10
Total votes		17,329	100.00
Democratic hold			

=== District 81 ===
2024 Iowa House of Representatives election, 81st District
Party	Candidate	Votes	%
Democratic	Daniel Gosa	9,806	94.45
Write-in		576	5.55
Total votes		10,382	100.00
Democratic gain from Republican			

=== District 82 ===
2024 Iowa House of Representatives election, 82nd District
Party	Candidate	Votes	%
Republican	Bobby Kaufmann (Incumbent)	10,312	60.53
Democratic	Phil Wiese	6,716	39.42
Write-in		9	0.05
Total votes		17,037	100.00
Republican hold			

=== District 83 ===
2024 Iowa House of Representatives election, 83rd District
Party	Candidate	Votes	%
Republican	Cindy Golding (Incumbent)	11,321	58.71
Democratic	Kent McNally	7,947	41.21
Write-in		14	0.07
Total votes		19,282	100.00
Republican hold			

=== District 84 ===
2024 Iowa House of Representatives election, 84th District
Party	Candidate	Votes	%
Republican	Thomas Gerhold (Incumbent)	11,672	72.85
Libertarian	Ashley Meredith	4,250	26.53
Write-in		99	0.62
Total votes		16,021	100.00
Republican hold			

=== District 85 ===
2024 Iowa House of Representatives election, 85th District
Party	Candidate	Votes	%
Democratic	Amy Nielsen (Incumbent)	13,794	97.69
Write-in		326	2.31
Total votes		14,120	100.00
Democratic hold			

=== District 86 ===
2024 Iowa House of Representatives election, 86th District
Party	Candidate	Votes	%
Democratic	David Jacoby (Incumbent)	12,544	76.01
Republican	Stephen Knoner	3,934	23.84
Write-in		26	0.16
Total votes		16,504	100.00
Democratic hold			

=== District 87 ===
2024 Iowa House of Representatives election, 87th District
Party	Candidate	Votes	%
Republican	Jeff Shipley (Incumbent)	8,221	57.54
Democratic	Thomas O’Donnell	5,655	39.58
Independent	Curtis Oliver	386	2.70
Write-in		25	0.17
Total votes		14,287	100.00
Republican hold			

=== District 88 ===
2024 Iowa House of Representatives election, 88th District
Party	Candidate	Votes	%
Republican	Helena Hayes (Incumbent)	12,191	97.72
Write-in		284	2.28
Total votes		12,475	100.00
Republican hold			

=== District 89 ===
89th District Democratic primary details

Democratic Primary, 89th District
Party	Candidate	Votes	%
Democratic	Elinor Levin (Incumbent)	1,266	91.01
Democratic	Ty Bopp	117	8.41
Write-in		8	0.58
Total votes		1,391	100.00

2024 Iowa House of Representatives election, 89th District
Party	Candidate	Votes	%
Democratic	Elinor Levin (Incumbent)	11,945	98.72
Write-in		155	1.28
Total votes		12,100	100.00
Democratic hold			

=== District 90 ===
2024 Iowa House of Representatives election, 90th District
Party	Candidate	Votes	%
Democratic	Adam Zabner (Incumbent)	14,477	98.51
Write-in		219	1.49
Total votes		14,696	100.00
Democratic hold			

=== District 91 ===
91st District Republican primary details

Republican Primary, 91st District
Party	Candidate	Votes	%
Republican	Judd Lawler	1,436	78.90
Republican	Adam Grier	378	20.77
Write-in		6	0.33
Total votes		1,820	100.00

2024 Iowa House of Representatives election, 91st District
Party	Candidate	Votes	%
Republican	Judd Lawler	10,646	54.81
Democratic	Jay Gorsh	8,762	45.11
Write-in		16	0.08
Total votes		19,424	100.00
Republican hold			

=== District 92 ===
2024 Iowa House of Representatives election, 92nd District
Party	Candidate	Votes	%
Republican	Heather Hora (Incumbent)	9,390	60.62
Democratic	Anna Banowsky	6,073	39.21
Write-in		26	0.17
Total votes		15,489	100.00
Republican hold			

=== District 93 ===
2024 Iowa House of Representatives election, 93rd District
Party	Candidate	Votes	%
Republican	Gary Mohr (Incumbent)	11,630	60.15
Democratic	Mindy Smith-Pace	7,681	39.73
Write-in		24	0.12
Total votes		19,335	100.00
Republican hold			

=== District 94 ===
2024 Iowa House of Representatives election, 94th District
Party	Candidate	Votes	%
Republican	Mike Vondran (Incumbent)	10,151	57.54
Democratic	Tracy J. Jones	7,465	42.31
Write-in		27	0.15
Total votes		17,643	100.00
Republican hold			

=== District 95 ===
2024 Iowa House of Representatives election, 95th District
Party	Candidate	Votes	%
Republican	Taylor Collins (Incumbent)	11,284	71.23
Democratic	Jeff Poulter	4,523	28.55
Write-in		34	0.21
Total votes		15,841	100.00
Republican hold			

=== District 96 ===
2024 Iowa House of Representatives election, 96th District
Party	Candidate	Votes	%
Republican	Mark Cisneros (Incumbent)	8,071	58.75
Democratic	Mandy Moody	5,649	41.12
Write-in		19	0.14
Total votes		13,739	100.00
Republican hold			

=== District 97 ===
2024 Iowa House of Representatives election, 97th District
Party	Candidate	Votes	%
Democratic	Ken Croken (Incumbent)	7,753	58.74
Republican	Josue Rodriguez	5,429	41.13
Write-in		17	0.13
Total votes		13,199	100.00
Democratic hold			

=== District 98 ===
2024 Iowa House of Representatives election, 98th District
Party	Candidate	Votes	%
Democratic	Monica Kurth (Incumbent)	6,585	50.06
Republican	Nathan Ramker	6,540	49.72
Write-in		29	0.22
Total votes		13,154	100.00
Democratic hold			

=== District 99 ===
2024 Iowa House of Representatives election, 99th District
Party	Candidate	Votes	%
Republican	Matthew Rinker (Incumbent)	7,755	55.57
Democratic	Jim Beres	6,162	44.16
Write-in		38	0.27
Total votes		13,955	100.00
Republican hold			

=== District 100 ===
2024 Iowa House of Representatives election, 100th District
Party	Candidate	Votes	%
Republican	Martin Graber (Incumbent)	9,466	67.61
Independent	Nicolas Atwood	4,489	32.06
Write-in		46	0.33
Total votes		14,001	100.00
Republican hold			
