= Mark Smith (Iowa politician) =

American politician (born 1952)

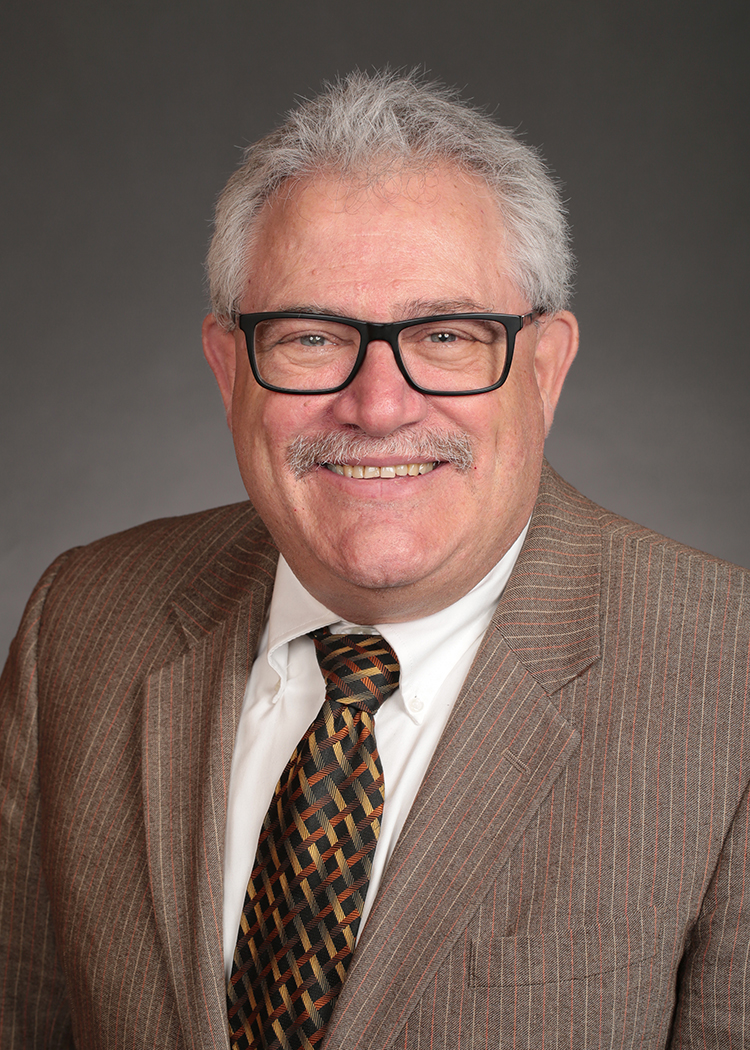

Chair of the Iowa Democratic Party
- In office February 15, 2020 – January 23, 2021
- Preceded by: Troy Price
- Succeeded by: Ross Wilburn

Minority Leader of the Iowa House of Representatives
- In office August 10, 2013 – January 14, 2019
- Preceded by: Kevin McCarthy
- Succeeded by: Todd Prichard

Member of the Iowa House of Representatives from the 71st district 64th (2001–2003)
- In office January 8, 2001 – January 10, 2021
- Preceded by: Beverly Nelson
- Succeeded by: Sue Cahill

Personal details
- Born: January 5, 1952 (age 74) Osceola, Iowa, U.S.
- Party: Democratic
- Spouse: Karen Lischer
- Education: Graceland University (BS); University of Iowa (MSW)
- Website: Official website

Mark D. Smith (born January 5, 1952) is an American politician who has served as a member of the Iowa House of Representatives since 2001.

== Early life and education ==
Smith was born and raised in Osceola, Iowa. He earned a Bachelor of Science from Graceland College and a Master of Social Work from the University of Iowa.

== Career ==
Smith works on the Substance Abuse Treatment Unit of Central Iowa and as an adjunct instructor of social work at the University of Iowa.

Smith serves on the Commission on Tobacco User Prevention and Control and on the Iowa Comprehensive Health Insurance Board. Prior to serving in the Iowa House of Representatives, Smith served on the Osceola City Council from 1981 to 1983.

On September 22, 2019, Smith announced that he would not seek re-election in 2020 and will retire after 20 years of service.

On February 15, 2020, Smith was elected chair of the Iowa Democratic Party.

Iowa House of Representatives
Preceded by Beverly Nelson	Member of the Iowa House of Representatives from the 64th district 2001–2003	Succeeded by Janet Petersen
Preceded by Joe Seng	Member of the Iowa House of Representatives from the 43rd district 2003–present	Incumbent
Preceded by Kevin McCarthy	Minority Leader of the Iowa House of Representatives; 2013–2019	Succeeded by Todd Prichard
Party political offices
Preceded by Troy Price	Chair of the Iowa Democratic Party; 2020–2021	Succeeded by Ross Wilburn
