= Iowa's 72nd House of Representatives district =

American legislative district

House District 72
- Type: District of the Lower house
- Location: Iowa
- Representative: Jennifer Smith
- Parent organization: Iowa General Assembly

The 72nd District of the Iowa House of Representatives in the state of Iowa. It is currently composed of part of Dubuque County.

== Current elected officials ==
Jennifer Smith is the representative currently representing the district.

== Past representatives ==
The district has previously been represented by:

- Howard A. Hamilton, 1971–1973
- Rayman D. Logue, 1973–1975
- Linda Svoboda, 1975–1979
- Phillip Tyrrell, 1979–1983
- Thomas E. Swartz, 1983–1991
- Gordon Burke, 1991–1993
- Jack Holveck, 1993–2001
- Janet Petersen, 2001–2003
- Rich Arnold, 2003–2013
- Dean Fisher, 2013–2023
- Charles Isenhart, 2023–2025
- Jennifer Smith, 2025–2027
- Matt Robinson, 2027–Present
