= Iowa's 33rd House of Representatives district =

American legislative district

House District 33
- Type: District of the Lower house
- Location: Iowa
- Representative: Ruth Ann Gaines
- Parent organization: Iowa General Assembly

The 33rd District of the Iowa House of Representatives in the state of Iowa is part of Polk County.

== Current elected officials ==
Ruth Ann Gaines is the representative currently representing the district.

== Past representatives ==
The district has previously been represented by:

- Sonja Egenes, 1971–1973
- Henry C. Wulff, 1973–1977
- Thomas A. Lind, 1977–1983
- Donald J. Knapp, 1983–1993
- Joseph L. Ertl, 1993–1997
- Paul Scherrman, 1997–2003
- Dick Taylor, 2003–2009
- Kirsten Running-Marquardt, 2009–2013
- Kevin McCarthy, 2013–2013
- Brian Meyer, 2013–2023
- Ruth Ann Gaines, 2023–2027
- Ivette Muhammad, 2027
