= Ruth Ann Gaines =

American politician (born 1947)

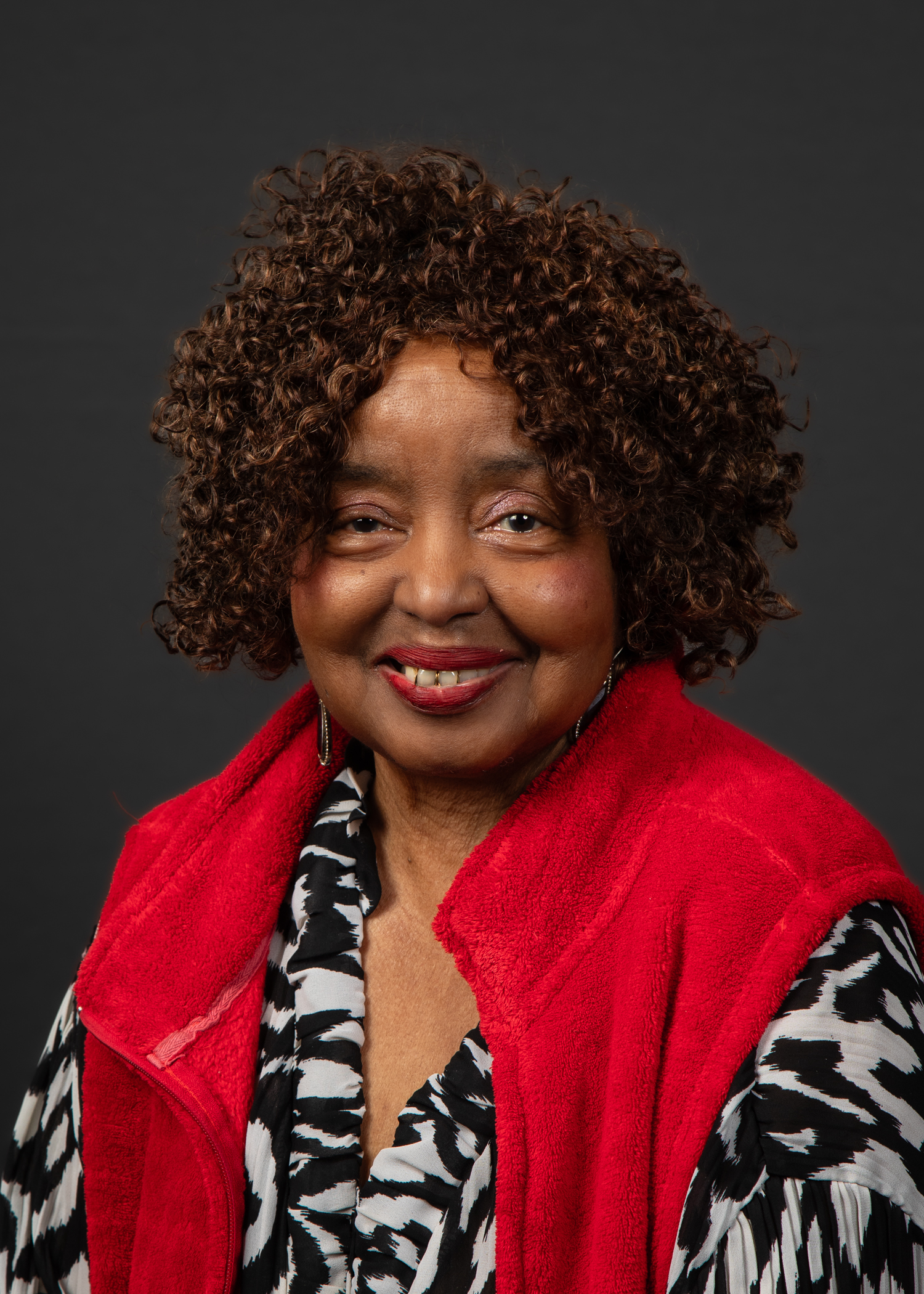
- 91st General Assembly portrait (2025)

Member of the Iowa House of Representatives from the 33rd district
- Incumbent
- Assumed office January 10, 2011
- Preceded by: Wayne Ford
- Succeeded by: Ivette Muhammad (elect)
- Constituency: District 33 (2023-Present); District 32 (2013-2023); District 65 (2011-2013)

Personal details
- Born: 1947 (age 78–79) Des Moines, Iowa, U.S.
- Party: Democratic
- Children: 1
- Education: Clarke College (BA); University of California, Santa Barbara (MA)
- Occupation: Educator, politician
- Website: Representative Gaines

Ruth Ann Gaines (born 1947) is the Iowa State Representative from the 33rd District. A Democrat, she has served in the Iowa House of Representatives since 2011.

Gaines will retire from the Iowa House at the end of the 2026 Legislative session and gave her retirement speech to the Iowa House of Representatives on April 6.

== Early life and education ==
Gaines was born in 1947 in Des Moines, Iowa. In 1965, she graduated from St. Joseph Academy. She received a B.A. in drama/speech from Clarke College in 1969 and an M.A. in dramatic art from the University of California, Santa Barbara in 1970.

Shortly after graduation, Gaines worked as a drama teacher at East High School in Des Moines and also taught speech and drama at Des Moines Area Community College. Gaines was active in theater as an actress, playwright, and director, and was involved in more than 200 plays. She spearheaded diversity and equity programs including Sisters for Success, a mentorship program for African American high school girls, and Voices of Change, a student performing group focused on cultural diversity and teen issues.

Gaines was named Iowa Teacher of the Year in 1998 and was inducted into the National Teachers Hall of Fame in 2003.

== Political career ==
Ruth Ann Gaines has been a member of the Iowa state house since January 2011, initially representing the 65th District. After redistricting, she represented the 32nd from 2013 to 2023, and the 33rd beginning in 2023. She is a founding member of the Iowa Legislative Black Caucus and has focused on education, diversity, disability rights, and mental health care. In her eight and final legislative term, Gaines currently serves on four committees: Economic Growth and Technology, Environmental Protection, Veterans Affairs, and International Relations. She was formerly the ranking member of the Ethics committee.

== Legacy ==
The auditorium at East High School in Des Moines was named after Gaines.

== Electoral history ==
*incumbent

Election	Political result	Candidate	Party	Votes	%
Iowa House of Representatives primary elections, 2010; District 65	Democratic	Ruth Ann Gaines	Democratic	unopposed	
Iowa House of Representatives elections, 2010; District 65; Turnout: 7,712	Democratic hold	Ruth Ann Gaines	Democratic	4,887	63.37%
Iowa House of Representatives elections, 2010; District 65; Turnout: 7,712	Democratic hold	Gary L. Jordan	Republican	2,358	30.58%
Iowa House of Representatives primary elections, 2012; District 32	Democratic	Ruth Ann Gaines*	Democratic	unopposed	
Iowa House of Representatives elections, 2012; District 32; Turnout: 11,880	Democratic (newly redistricted)	Ruth Ann Gaines*	Democratic	8,073	67.95%
Iowa House of Representatives elections, 2012; District 32; Turnout: 11,880	Democratic (newly redistricted)	Joe Corbin	Republican	3,109	26.17%

Iowa House of Representatives
Preceded by Wayne Ford	65th District; 2011–2013	Succeeded by Tyler Olson
Preceded by Steven Lukan	32nd District; 2013–2023	Succeeded by Jennifer Konfrst
Preceded by Brian Meyer	33rd District; 2023–Present	Succeeded by Incumbent
