= Iowa's 59th House of Representatives district =

American legislative district

House District 59
- Type: District of the Lower house
- Location: Iowa
- Representative: Christian Hermanson
- Parent organization: Iowa General Assembly

The 59th District of the Iowa House of Representatives in the state of Iowa. It is currently composed of part of Cerro Gordo County.

== Current elected officials ==
Christian Hermanson is the representative currently representing the district.

== Past representatives ==
The district has previously been represented by:

- Vernon N. Bennett, 1971–1973
- David Readinger, 1973–1977
- Lyle Krewson, 1977–1983
- Brian Carter, 1983–1987
- Clyde Norrgard, 1987–1989
- Gregory Spenner, 1989–1993
- Phillip Tyrrell, 1993–2003
- Gene Maddox, 2003–2007
- Dan Clute, 2007–2009
- Chris Hagenow, 2009–2013
- Bob Kressig, 2013–2023
- Sharon Steckman, 2023–2025
- Christian Hermanson, 2025–2027
- Jacob Welper, 2027–Present
