= Brian Quirk =

American politician (born 1968)

Brian J. Quirk
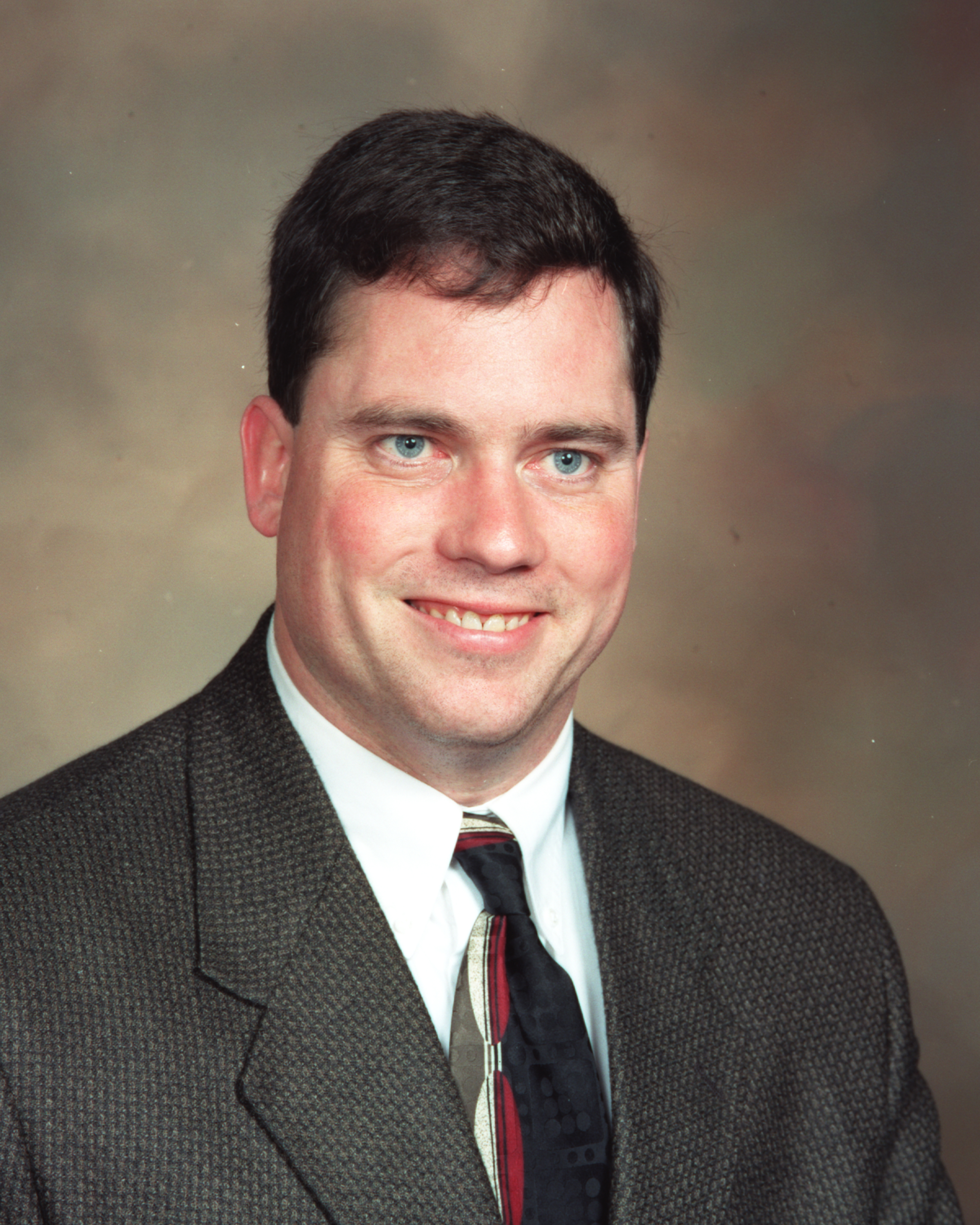

Member of the Iowa House of Representatives from the 15th district 30th (2001 – 2003)
- In office January 8, 2001 – November 28, 2012
- Preceded by: Keith Weigel
- Succeeded by: Todd Prichard

Personal details
- Born: July 11, 1968 (age 58) New Hampton, Iowa
- Party: Democratic
- Spouse: Anita
- Children: 2 daughters
- Profession: Electrical Contractor
- Website: Quirk's website

Brian J. Quirk (born July 11, 1968) is a former Democratic member of the Iowa House of Representatives, representing the 30th District from 2001 to 2003, and the 15th District from 2003-2012. He received his AA from North Area Community College. He is a veteran and served in the military from 1987-1991.

Quirk served on several committees in the Iowa House - the Agriculture, State Government, and Ways and Means committees. He also served as ranking member of the Commerce Committee and as a member of the Transportation, Infrastructure, and Capitals Appropriations Subcommittee and of the Information Technology Council.

Quirk works at New Hampton Electric, his family's business in New Hampton. He is a master electrician.

On November 28, 2012, Quirk resigned his seat to take a job as the general manager of the New Hampton Municipal Light Plant.

== Electoral history ==
*incumbent

Election	Political result	Candidate	Party	Votes	%
Iowa House of Representatives elections, 2000; District 30; Turnout: 13,188	Democratic hold	Brian Quirk	Democratic	7,339	55.6
Iowa House of Representatives elections, 2000; District 30; Turnout: 13,188	Democratic hold	Allen Borlaug	Republican	5,842	44.3
Iowa House of Representatives elections, 2002; District 15	Democratic (newly redistricted)	Brian Quirk*	Democratic	unopposed	
Iowa House of Representatives elections, 2004; District 15; Turnout: 14,332	Democratic hold	Brian Quirk*	Democratic	8,422	58.8
Iowa House of Representatives elections, 2004; District 15; Turnout: 14,332	Democratic hold	Arnie Boge	Republican	5,899	41.2
Iowa House of Representatives elections, 2006; District 15; Turnout: 10,556	Democratic hold	Brian J. Quirk*	Democratic	7,147	67.7
Iowa House of Representatives elections, 2006; District 15; Turnout: 10,556	Democratic hold	David Kraft	Republican	3,184	30.2
Iowa House of Representatives elections, 2008; District 15; Turnout: 13,031	Democratic hold	Brian J. Quirk*	Democratic	9,679	74.3
Iowa House of Representatives elections, 2008; District 15; Turnout: 13,031	Democratic hold	Dan Lensing	Independent	3,336	25.6
Iowa House of Representatives elections, 2010; District 15; Turnout: 10,907	Democratic hold	Brian J. Quirk*	Democratic	5,790	53.1
Iowa House of Representatives elections, 2010; District 15; Turnout: 10,907	Democratic hold	Michael T. Klimesh	Republican	4,856	44.5
Iowa House of Representatives elections, 2012; District 52; Turnout: 13,707	Democratic hold	Brian J. Quirk*	Democratic	9,777	71.33
Iowa House of Representatives elections, 2012; District 52; Turnout: 13,707	Democratic hold	Craig Clark	Other	3,916	28.57

Iowa House of Representatives
Preceded by Keith Weigel	30th District; 2001 – 2003	Succeeded by Dick Myers
Preceded by Dolores Mertz	15th District; 2003 – present	Succeeded by Incumbent
