= Arnold Lindeen =

American politician (1910–1990)

Member of the Iowa House of Representatives from the 83rd district
- In office January 13, 1975 – January 7, 1979
- Preceded by: Charles Strothman
- Succeeded by: Virgil Corey

Personal details
- Born: May 9, 1910 Swedesburg, Iowa
- Died: January 1, 1990 (aged 79)
- Party: Republican

Arnold Lindeen (May 9, 1910 – January 1, 1990) was an American politician who served in the Iowa House of Representatives from the 83rd district from 1975 to 1979.
