= Jennifer Smith (Iowa politician) =

American politician

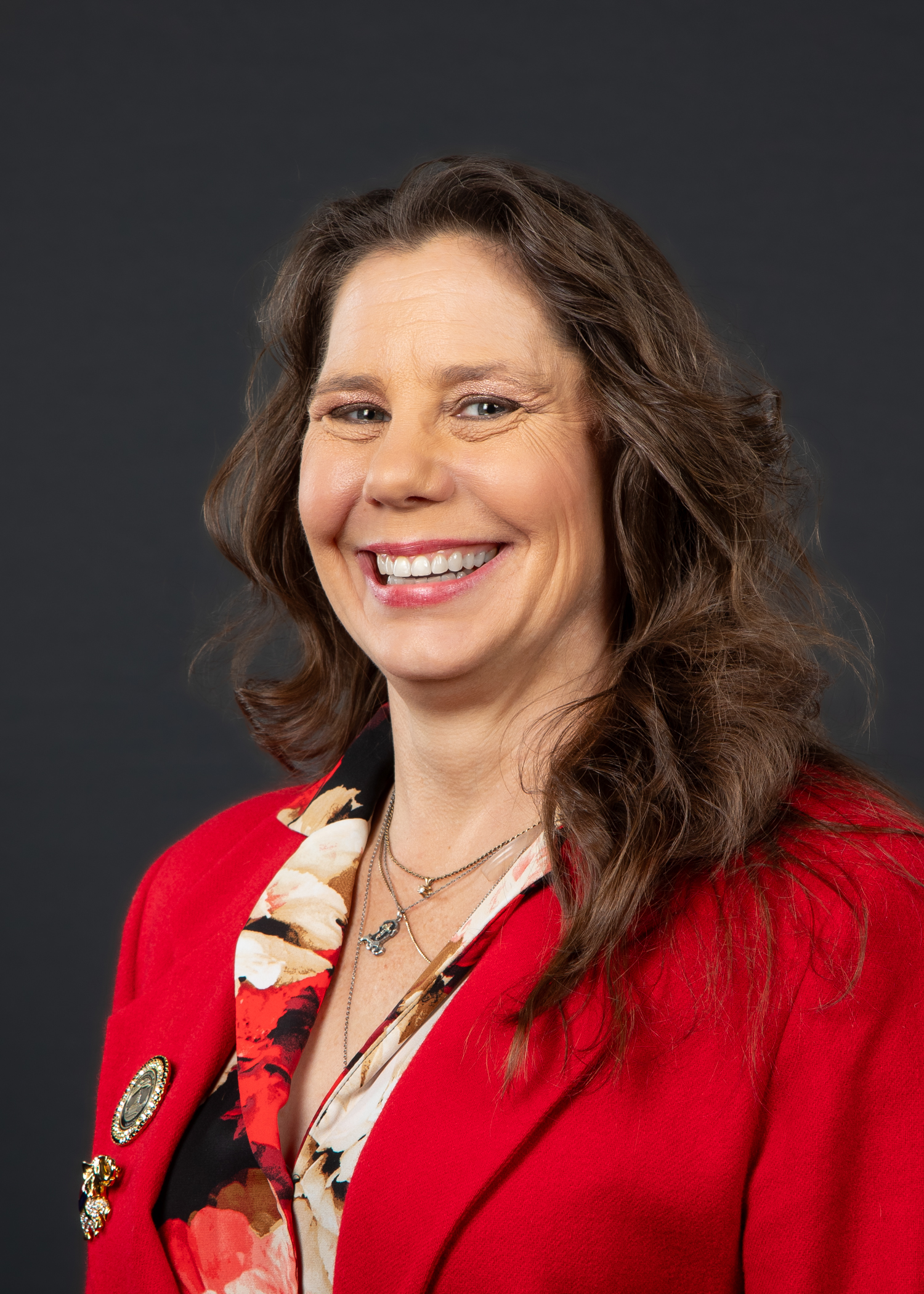

Member of the Iowa House of Representatives from the 72nd district
- Incumbent
- Assumed office January 13, 2025
- Preceded by: Charles Isenhart
- Succeeded by: Matt Robinson (elect)

Personal details
- Born: 1973 (age 52–53) Madison, Wisconsin
- Party: Republican
- Spouse: John Kielty
- Education: Illinois State University (B.S., M.S.); Northern Illinois University (Ph.D.)
- Occupation: Professor

Jennifer J. Smith (born 1973) is an American educator and politician, serving as an Iowa House Representative for the 72nd district, which is in Dubuque County. She is a member of the Iowa Republican Party.

== Career ==
Smith attended Normal Community High School before attending Illinois State University, where she received her B.S. in mathematics and her M.S. in economics. She would then go on to receive her Ph.D. in economics at Northern Illinois University. She now works as an assistant professor of economics at Loras College in Dubuque.

Smith ran for and won Iowa State House District 72 in 2024, defeating Democratic incumbent Charles Isenhart. Smith previously unsuccessfully ran for the 72nd district in 2022, only losing by 94 votes. She was also the Republican nominee for the 50th district in the 2020 Iowa State Senate elections.

She was unseated by Democrat Matt Robinson in the 2026 election.

=== 2025-2027 Committee assignments ===
- State Government (vice chair)
- Local Government
- Natural Resources
- Administration and Regulation Appropriations Subcommittee

== Personal life ==
Smith was born in 1973 in Madison, Wisconsin. She has lived in Knob Noster, Missouri; Kansas City, Kansas; and Bloomington, Illinois. She now resides in Dubuque with her husband, John Kielty, and her two adult stepchildren.
