= St. Joseph Academy (Des Moines, Iowa) =

Coordinates: 41.5839°N 93.6613°W

St. Joseph Academy (SJA) was a Catholic all-girls high school in Des Moines, Iowa. It merged with Dowling Catholic High School in 1972.

== History ==
The Sisters of Charity of the Blessed Virgin Mary from Mt. Carmel in Dubuque, Iowa founded St. Joseph Academy on March 19, 1885. Initially, the Sisters of Charity taught just sixteen girls. Because of poor transportation options, only a few students were able to get to this school, which was located outside of Des Moines proper. The very first graduating class consisted of just one girl. Over the years, additions to this school were constructed, including a library, a hall, classrooms, a chapel, a music hall and an auditorium. As the city of Des Moines began to grow toward SJA, enrollment began to increase. By the 1960s, due to increasing enrollment extensive additions were made to St. Joseph's. The SJA preschool was in operation by 1950 and remained open until 1971.

== Closing ==
In 1971, SJA merged with Dowling High School, the boys' Catholic high school in Des Moines. The Academy was purchased by the College of Osteopathic Medicine (now the Des Moines University Osteopathic Medical Center).

== Notable alumni ==
=== Alumnae ===
- Karen Morrow '54 - actress/singer
- Ruth Ann Gaines '65 - Iowa State Representative from the 32nd District
