= Todd Prichard =

American politician (born 1974)

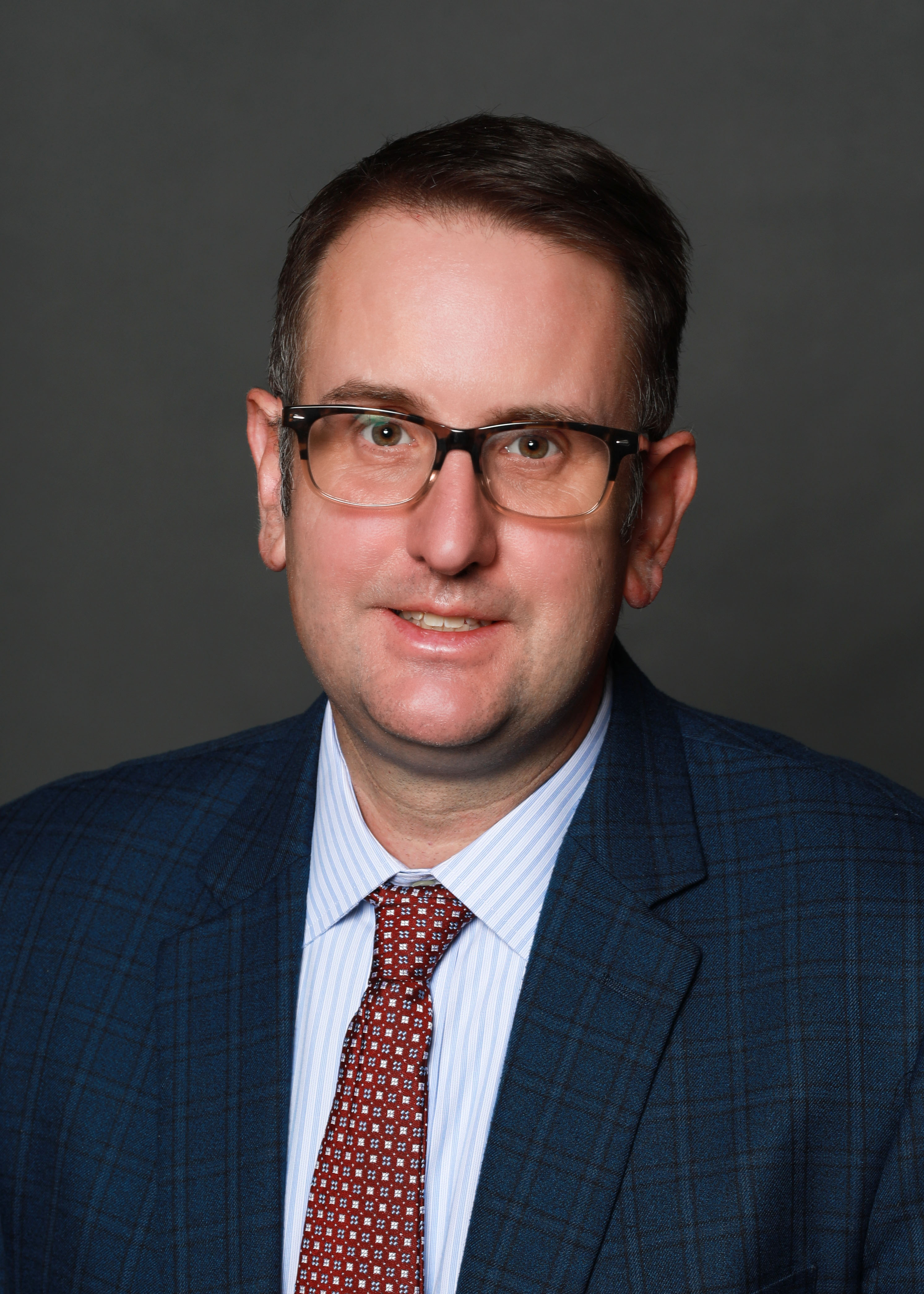

Minority Leader of the Iowa House of Representatives
- In office January 14, 2019 – June 2, 2021
- Preceded by: Mark Smith
- Succeeded by: Jennifer Konfrst

Member of the Iowa House of Representatives from the 52nd district
- In office January 29, 2013 – January 9, 2023
- Preceded by: Brian Quirk
- Succeeded by: Sue Cahill (redistricting)

County Attorney of Floyd County
- Incumbent
- Assumed office March 29, 2023

Personal details
- Born: 1974 (age 51–52) Davenport, Iowa, U.S.
- Party: Democratic
- Spouse: Ann
- Children: 3
- Education: University of Iowa (BA, JD)
- Website: State House website

Todd Prichard (born 1974) is a former Democratic member of the Iowa House of Representatives from the 52nd district. Prichard was first elected in a January 22, 2013 special election.

Prichard was considering running for governor in 2018, but dropped out of the race.

On June 2, 2021, Prichard announced that he would step down from his position as House Minority Leader. Since retiring from the Iowa House of Representatives in 2023, Prichard has served as the Floyd County Attorney in Charles City, Iowa as well as working in private practice.

== Electoral history ==
Election	Political result	Candidate	Party	Votes	%
Iowa House of Representatives special elections, 2013; District 52; Turnout: 5,461	Democratic hold	Todd Prichard	Democratic	2,974	54.46%
Iowa House of Representatives special elections, 2013; District 52; Turnout: 5,461	Democratic hold	Dennis Litterer	Republican	2,398	43.91%
Iowa House of Representatives special elections, 2013; District 52; Turnout: 5,461	Democratic hold	Craig Clark	Independent	84	1.54%
Iowa House of Representatives special elections, 2013; District 52; Turnout: 5,461	Democratic hold	Write-In		5	0.09%
Iowa House of Representatives elections, 2014; District 52; Turnout: 8,637	Democratic hold	Todd Prichard	Democratic	8,509	98.52%
Iowa House of Representatives elections, 2014; District 52; Turnout: 8,637	Democratic hold	Write-In		128	1.48%
Iowa House of Representatives elections, 2016; District 52; Turnout: 15,017	Democratic hold	Todd Prichard	Democratic	8,160	54.34%
Iowa House of Representatives elections, 2016; District 52; Turnout: 15,017	Democratic hold	Stacie Stokes	Republican	6,847	45.59%
Iowa House of Representatives elections, 2016; District 52; Turnout: 15,017	Democratic hold	Write-In		10	0.07%
Iowa House of Representatives elections, 2018; District 52; Turnout: 9,465	Democratic hold	Todd Prichard	Democratic	9,465	97.26%
Iowa House of Representatives elections, 2018; District 52; Turnout: 9,465	Democratic hold	Write-In		267	2.74%
Iowa House of Representatives elections, 2020; District 52; Turnout: 15,853	Democratic hold	Todd Prichard	Democratic	8,210	51.79%
Iowa House of Representatives elections, 2020; District 52; Turnout: 15,853	Democratic hold	Craig A. Clark	Republican	7,072	44.61%
Iowa House of Representatives elections, 2020; District 52; Turnout: 15,853	Democratic hold	Write-In		11	0.06%

Iowa House of Representatives
Preceded by Brian Quirk	Member of the Iowa House of Representatives from the 52nd district 2013–2023	Succeeded by Sue Cahill
Preceded by Mark Smith	Minority Leader of the Iowa House of Representatives; 2019–2021	Succeeded by Jennifer Konfrst
