= Bill Gustoff =

American politician (born 1968)

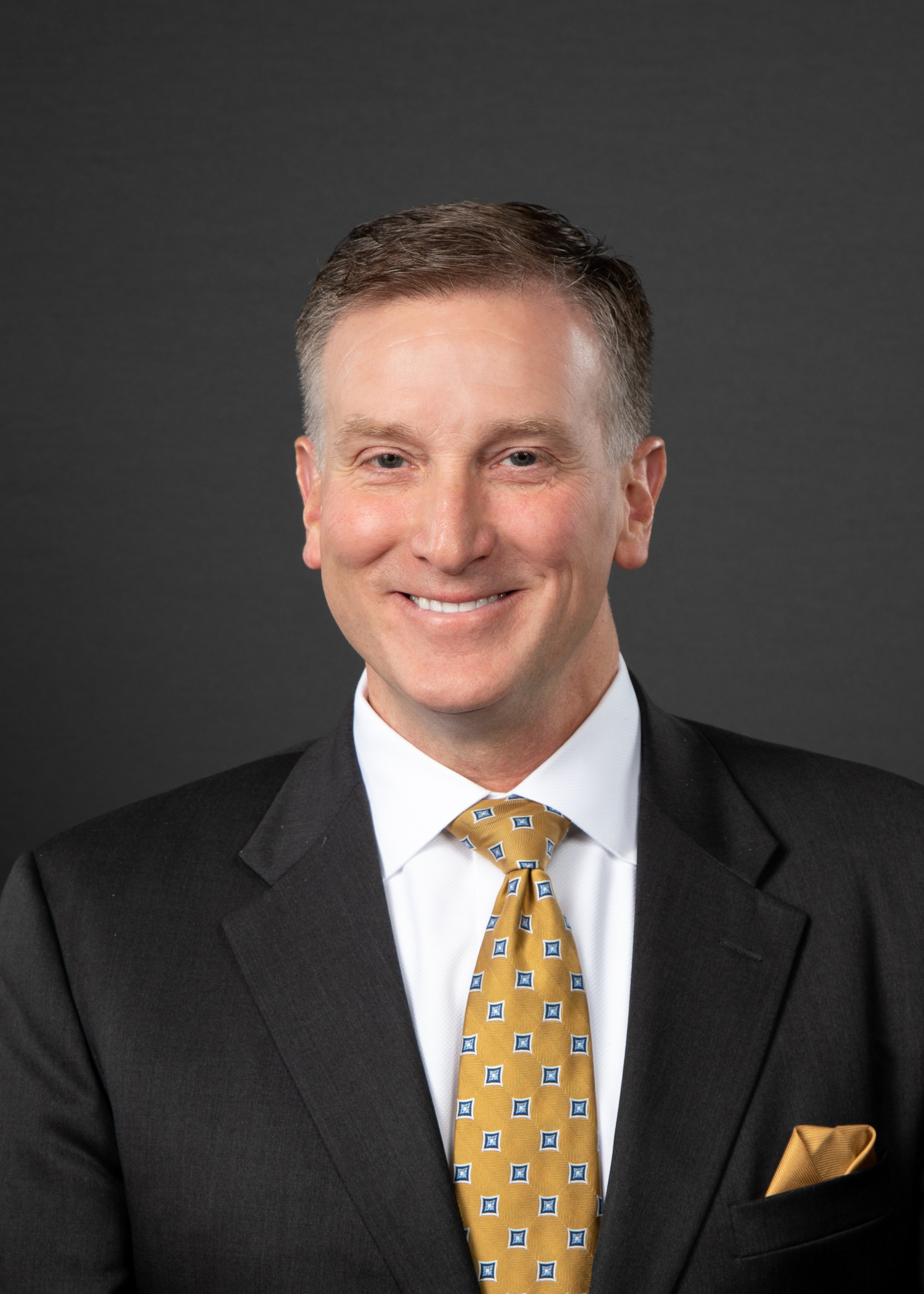
- Official portrait, 2023

Member of the Iowa House of Representatives from the 40th district
- Incumbent
- Assumed office January 9, 2023
- Preceded by: John Forbes (redistricting)
- Succeeded by: Heather Sievers (elect)

Personal details
- Born: 1968 (age 57–58) Independence, Iowa, U.S.
- Party: Republican
- Spouse: Sara
- Children: 4
- Education: University of Northern Iowa; Elliott School of International Affairs; University of Iowa (BA, JD)
- Occupation: Attorney

William R. Gustoff (born 1968) is an American politician and attorney who has represented the 40th district of the Iowa House of Representatives since January 2023, which covers a small part of Polk County, including Altoona and parts of northeast Des Moines. He is a member of the Republican Party.

== Early life and education ==
Gustoff was born in 1968 in Independence, Iowa, and was raised in Center Point, Iowa. He was one of three children. His father was a municipal employee and his mother was a school teacher.

Gustoff attended the University of Northern Iowa from 1986 to 1987, the Elliott School of International Affairs from 1987 to 1990, received a Bachelor of Arts in political science from the University of Iowa in 1993, and received a Juris Doctor with Distinction from the University of Iowa College of Law in 1995.

== Political career ==
Gustoff first held public office when he was elected to the Center Point School Board at the age of 18. He also served as the treasurer of the Republican Party of Iowa for eight years prior to his legislative career, and has served as vice chairman of the Emmaus Bible College Board of Trustees.

Following decennial redistricting in 2021, Gustoff announced his candidacy for the open 40th district seat in the Iowa House of Representatives in January 2022. He ran unopposed in the Republican primary on June 7, 2022, winning with over 99 percent of the vote, and won the general election on November 8 with over 49 percent of the vote, defeating Democrat Mackenzie Bills by just over three points. He assumed office on January 9, 2023.

Gustoff endorsed Ron DeSantis for president in 2023.

In 2024, Gustoff filed to run for reelection. He won the Republican primary unopposed on June 4, 2024, and faced Democrat Heather Sievers in the general election on November 5, 2024, whom he defeated by nearly two points, winning almost 51 percent of the vote.

Gustoff again filed to run for reelection in 2026, winning the Republican primary unopposed on June 2, 2026, and again faced Sievers in the general election on November 3, 2026. He lost reelection to Sievers by over 1,300 votes.

During his time in the House, Gustoff served on the Ways & Means, Public Safety, Judiciary, Appropriations, and Ethics committees, the lattermost of which he served as chairman.

Gustoff has described himself as a "conservatarian". He supports the Second Amendment and school choice and opposes abortion and assisted suicide.

== Personal life ==
Gustoff has a wife, Sara, and four children. He resides with his family in Des Moines. He has described himself as an evangelical Christian.

Gustoff is a practicing attorney and is a founding partner of the Hagenow Gustoff & Karas law firm. He is a member of the Iowa, Illinois, and Nebraska state bar associations, the Christian Legal Society, and Habitat for Humanity of Iowa, among several other organizations.

== Electoral history ==
*=incumbent

Election	Political result	Candidate	Party	Votes	%
Iowa House of Representatives Republican primary elections, 2022; District 40; Turnout: 1,450	Republican (newly redistricted)	Bill Gustoff	Republican	1,440	99.3
Iowa House of Representatives Republican primary elections, 2022; District 40; Turnout: 1,450	Republican (newly redistricted)	Other/Write-in votes		10	0.7
Iowa House of Representatives general elections, 2022; District 40; Turnout: 12,654	Republican (newly redistricted)	Bill Gustoff	Republican	6,300	49.8
Iowa House of Representatives general elections, 2022; District 40; Turnout: 12,654	Republican (newly redistricted)	Mackenzie Bills	Democratic	5,879	46.5
Iowa House of Representatives general elections, 2022; District 40; Turnout: 12,654	Republican (newly redistricted)	Jeni Kadel	Libertarian	469	3.7
Iowa House of Representatives general elections, 2022; District 40; Turnout: 12,654	Republican (newly redistricted)	Other/Write-in votes		6	0.05
Iowa House of Representatives Republican primary elections, 2024; District 40; Turnout: 460	Republican	Bill Gustoff*	Republican	450	97.8
Iowa House of Representatives Republican primary elections, 2024; District 40; Turnout: 460	Republican	Other/Write-in votes		10	2.2
Iowa House of Representatives general elections, 2024; District 40; Turnout: 17,146	Republican (newly redistricted)	Bill Gustoff*	Republican	8,720	50.9
Iowa House of Representatives general elections, 2024; District 40; Turnout: 17,146	Republican (newly redistricted)	Heather Sievers	Democratic	8,402	49
Iowa House of Representatives general elections, 2024; District 40; Turnout: 17,146	Republican (newly redistricted)	Other/Write-in votes		24	0.1
