= Iowa's 40th House of Representatives district =

American legislative district

House District 40
- Type: District of the Lower house
- Location: Iowa
- Representative: Bill Gustoff
- Parent organization: Iowa General Assembly

The 40th District of the Iowa House of Representatives in the state of Iowa. It is currently composed of part of Polk County.

== Current elected officials ==
Bill Gustoff is the representative currently representing the district.

== Past representatives ==
The district has previously been represented by:

- Barton L. Schwieger, 1971–1973
- James C. West, 1973–1981
- Lisle M. Cook, 1981–1983
- Donald F. Hermann, 1983–1991
- David A. Millage, 1991–1993
- Steven E. Grubbs, 1993–1997
- Danny J. Holmes, 1997–2001
- Bryan Sievers, 2001–2003
- Lance Horbach, 2003–2013
- John Forbes, 2013–2023
- Bill Gustoff, 2023–2027
- Heather Sievers, 2027
