= Matt Robinson (American politician) =

American politician

Member of the Iowa House of Representatives from the 72nd district
- Member-elect
- Assumed office January 1, 2027
- Preceded by: Jennifer Smith

Personal details
- Party: Democratic
- Website: Campaign website

Matt Robinson is an American politician. A member of the Democratic Party, he was elected to the Iowa House of Representatives in 2026, representing the 72nd district. He unseated Republican Jennifer Smith in the 2026 election. He is a carpenter and union member.
