= Ivette Muhammad =

American politician

Member of the Iowa House of Representatives from the 33rd district
- Member-elect
- Assumed office January 1, 2027
- Preceded by: Ruth Ann Gaines

Personal details
- Party: Democratic
- Website: ivetteforthepeople.com

Ivette Muhammad is an American politician. A member of the Democratic Party, she was elected to the Iowa House of Representatives in 2026, representing the 33rd district. She succeeded fellow Democrat Ruth Ann Gaines in the 2026 election. She was chief operations officer of the Des Moines nonprofit Creative Vision.
