= Ulysses Sherman Alderman =

American politician (1865–1926)

Member of the Iowa House of Representatives from the 52nd district
- In office January 13, 1919 – January 9, 1921

Personal details
- Born: August 2, 1865 Nevada, Iowa, U.S.
- Died: May 14, 1926 (aged 60) Nevada, Iowa, U.S.
- Party: Republican
- Education: University of Iowa
- Occupation: Politician, lawyer

Ulysses Sherman Alderman (August 2, 1865 – May 14, 1926) was an American politician.

Theodore E. Alderman and his wife Hannah moved to the first house built in Nevada, Iowa, in 1853, and their son Ulysses was born there on August 2, 1865. The Aldermans' home also served as a store, post office, and courtroom. Ulysses Alderman graduated from Nevada High School in 1883, and worked for his father's hardware store until 1895, when he enrolled in the University of Iowa College of Law. After completing his legal studies in 1897, Alderman practiced law in his hometown. He was active in the American Red Cross and promoted liberty bonds during World War I. He held office as a Republican legislator for District 52 of the Iowa House of Representatives from January 13, 1919, to January 9, 1921. Alderman died at home in Nevada of a ruptured coronary artery on May 14, 1926.
