= Mike Tupper =

American politician

Member of the Iowa House of Representatives from the 52nd district
- Member-elect
- Assumed office January 1, 2027
- Preceded by: David Blom

Personal details
- Party: Democratic
- Website: Campaign website

Michael (Mike) Tupper is an American politician. A member of the Democratic Party, he was elected to the Iowa House of Representatives in 2026, representing the 52nd district. He unseated Republican David Blom in the 2026 election. He was the Police Chief of Marshalltown, Iowa. He retired from law enforcement in 2025.
