= Jacob Welper =

American politician

Member of the Iowa House of Representatives from the 59th district
- Member-elect
- Assumed office January 1, 2027
- Preceded by: Christian Hermanson

Personal details
- Party: Democratic
- Education: Iowa State University
- Website: Campaign website

Jacob Welper is an American politician. A member of the Democratic Party, he was elected to the Iowa House of Representatives in 2026, representing the 59th district. He unseated Republican Christian Hermanson in the 2026 election. He is a lifelong Iowan. Welper is an Iowa Army National Guard Sergeant and teacher.
