= Lyle Krewson =

American politician

Member of the Iowa House of Representatives from the 83rd district
- In office January 10, 1983 – January 13, 1985
- Preceded by: Virgil Corey
- Succeeded by: Janet Metcalf

Member of the Iowa House of Representatives from the 59th district
- In office January 10, 1977 – January 9, 1983
- Preceded by: David Readinger
- Succeeded by: Brian Carter

Personal details
- Born: October 27, 1943 (age 82) Delta, Iowa
- Party: Republican

Lyle Krewson (born October 27, 1943) is an American politician who served in the Iowa House of Representatives from 1977 to 1985.

== Personal life ==
Lyle Krewson, born to Kermit and Lucille Krewson, completed his secondary education at Van Horne High School in 1961. He earned his B.A. from the University of Iowa in 1967 and has been actively involved in the field of politics since 1968. He is a single son.
