= Patrick Shey =

American politician

Member of the Iowa House of Representatives from the 52nd district
- In office January 11, 1999 – January 12, 2003

Personal details
- Born: January 22, 1959 (age 67) Algona, Iowa, United States
- Party: Republican
- Spouse: Nancy
- Children: three
- Occupation: Lawyer

Patrick S. Shey (born January 22, 1959) is an American politician in the state of Iowa.

Shey was born in Algona, Iowa and attended the University of Iowa and DePaul University. A Republican, he served in the Iowa House of Representatives from 1999 to 2003 (52nd district), from Linn County, Iowa.
