= Heather Sievers =

American politician

Member of the Iowa House of Representatives from the 40th district
- Member-elect
- Assumed office January 1, 2027
- Preceded by: Bill Gustoff

Personal details
- Party: Democratic
- Education: Cornell College; Naropa University; University of Iowa
- Website: www.heathersievers4iowa.com

Heather Sievers is an American politician. A member of the Democratic Party, she was elected to the Iowa House of Representatives in 2026, representing the 40th district. She unseated incumbent Republican Bill Gustoff in the 2026 election. It was a rematch of 2024. She is a registered nurse from Altoona. She is the mother of a child of rare disabilities.
