= Sue Cahill =

American politician (born 1959)

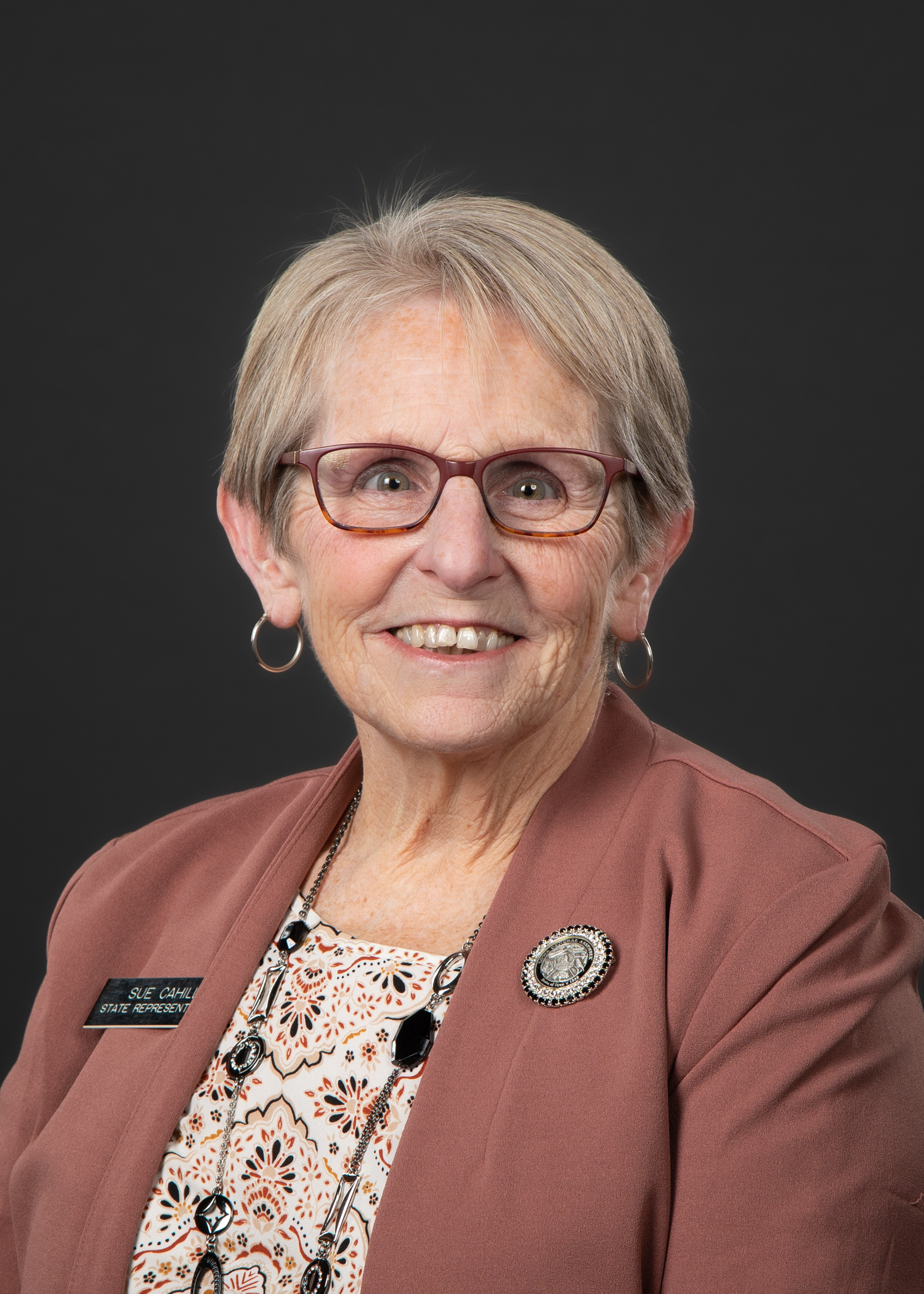

Member of the Iowa House of Representatives from the 52nd district
- In office January 11, 2021 – January 13, 2025
- Preceded by: Mark Smith
- Succeeded by: David Blom

Personal details
- Born: 1959 (age 66–67) Kansas City, Missouri
- Party: Democratic
- Children: 6
- Education: Benedictine College (BA); Buena Vista University (BA); Graceland University (MEd)

Sue Cahill (born 1959) is an American politician and educator. A Democrat, she was a member of the Iowa House of Representatives for the 52nd district from 2021 to 2025.

== Early life and education ==
Cahill was born in 1959 in Kansas City, Missouri. She graduated from Archbishop O'Hara High School and received a bachelor's of arts degree in communications from Benedictine College and a bachelor's of arts degree in education from Buena Vista University. She earned a masters of education from Graceland University. She worked as a teacher in the Marshalltown Community School District and served as a member of the city council of Marshalltown, Iowa. During the 2020 Iowa Democratic presidential caucuses, Cahill supported Pete Buttigieg.

== Career ==
Cahill was first elected to the Iowa House of Representatives for the 71st district in 2020, assuming office on January 11, 2021. She ran unopposed in the Democratic primary and defeated Republican nominee Tony Reed in the November general election, receiving 6,800 votes to his 5,315. She is a member of the administration and rules committee, the education committee, the labor committee and ranking member of the veterans affairs committee.

In the 2022 general election, Cahill is running unopposed in the 52nd district, a new district which was created during the 2020 redistricting cycle.

In the 2024 Iowa House of Representatives election, she was unseated by Republican David Blom.

== Personal life ==
Cahill has six sons. Her husband, John, died of colon cancer in 2006.

Iowa House of Representatives
Preceded by Todd Prichard	52nd District; 2023 – 2025	Succeeded by David Blom
Preceded by Mark Smith	71st District; 2021 – 2023	Succeeded by Lindsay James
