= Keith Weigel =

American politician from Iowa (born 1955)

Member of the Iowa House of Representatives
- In office January 11, 1993 – January 7, 2001

Personal details
- Born: November 19, 1955 (age 70) San Diego, California, United States
- Party: Democratic
- Occupation: Financial planner

Keith Weigel (born November 19, 1955) is an American politician in the state of Iowa.

Weigel was born in San Diego, California and attended University of Iowa. A Democrat, he served in the Iowa House of Representatives from 1993 to 2001 (30th district).
