= Janet Petersen =

American politician (born 1970)

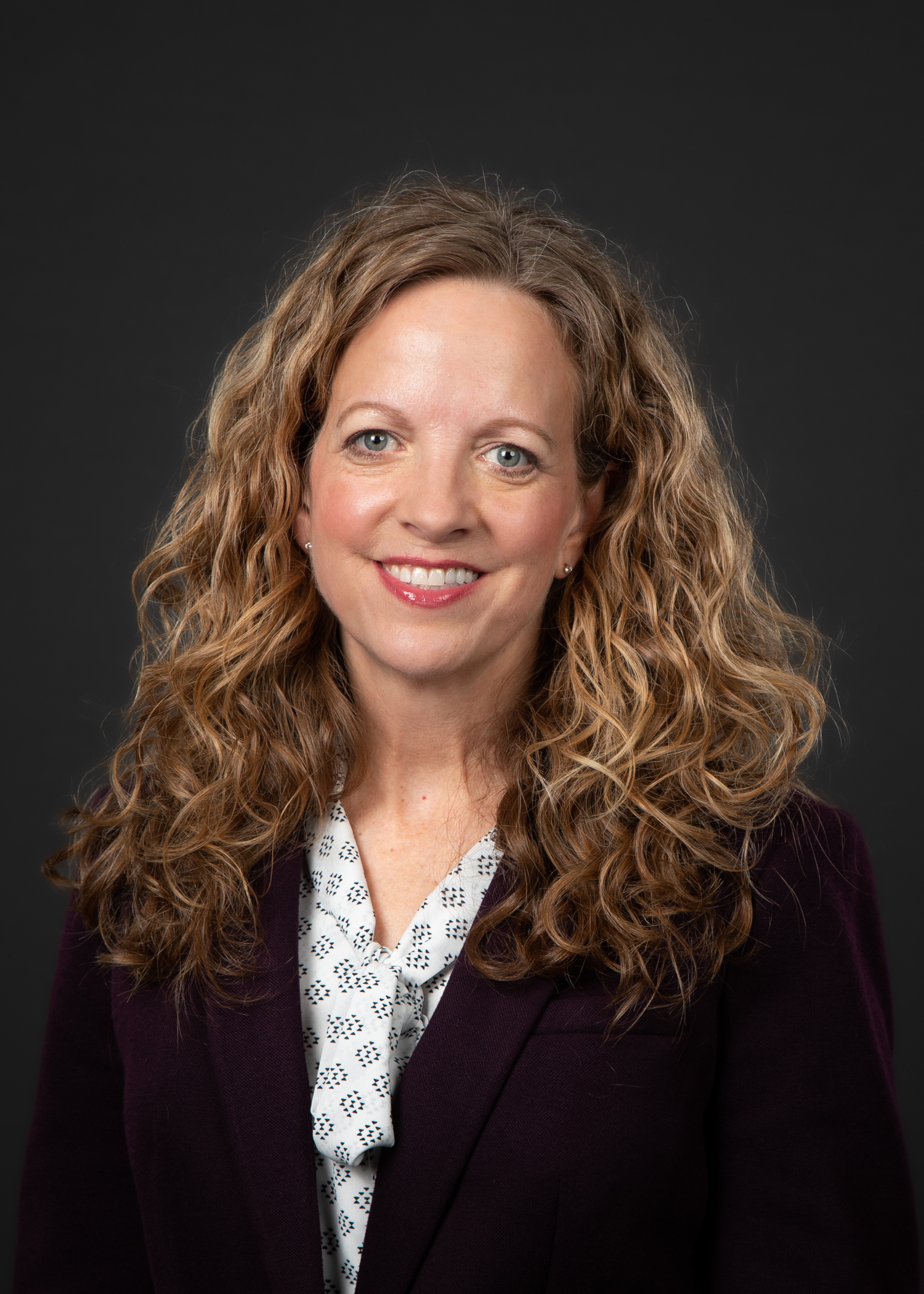
- Official portrait, 2023

Minority Leader of the Iowa Senate
- In office October 22, 2017 – January 11, 2021
- Preceded by: Rob Hogg
- Succeeded by: Zach Wahls

Member of the Iowa Senate from the 18th district
- Incumbent
- Assumed office January 14, 2013
- Preceded by: Liz Mathis

Member of the Iowa House of Representatives from the 64th district
- In office January 8, 2001 – January 13, 2013
- Preceded by: Jack Holveck
- Succeeded by: Bruce Bearinger

Personal details
- Born: August 1, 1970 (age 55) Beaverdale, Iowa, U.S.
- Party: Democratic
- Spouse: Brian Pattinson
- Education: University of Northern Iowa (BA); Drake University (MA)
- Website: Campaign website

Janet Petersen (born August 1, 1970) is an American politician and a Democratic member of the Iowa Senate representing the 18th District since January 2013. She previously served as the Senate Minority Leader and has previously represented the 64th district in the Iowa House of Representatives, between 2001 and 2013. She received her BA from the University of Northern Iowa and her MA from Drake University.

Petersen serves on several committees in the Iowa Senate – the Government Oversight, Judiciary, State Government and Ways & Means committees. She also serves as the ranking member of the Commerce Committee. Petersen served as state Senate minority leader after replacing Rob Hogg in October 2017. She was the first woman to lead the Senate Democratic caucus.

== Career ==
Before her election to the state legislature, Petersen worked for the '92 Clinton-Gore campaign, the American Heart Association, and Strategic America, a marketing communications firm.

Since becoming a politician, much of her private work has focused on making Iowa "the safest place in the nation to have a baby". In 2004, she helped launch a stillbirth registry project that brings in more than $2 million a year to find causes and cures of stillbirths.

== Electoral history ==
*incumbent

Election	Political result	Candidate	Party	Votes	%
Iowa House of Representatives primary elections, 2000; District 72; Turnout: 3,228	Democratic	Janet Petersen	Democratic	1,897	58.8
Iowa House of Representatives primary elections, 2000; District 72; Turnout: 3,228	Democratic	Kevin McCarthy	Democratic	1,289	39.9
Iowa House of Representatives elections, 2000; District 72; Turnout: 13,701	Democratic hold	Janet Petersen	Democratic	8,843	64.5
Iowa House of Representatives elections, 2000; District 72; Turnout: 13,701	Democratic hold	Jeff Chavannes	Republican	4,843	35.3
Iowa House of Representatives elections, 2002; District 64	Democratic (newly redistricted)	Janet Petersen*	Democratic	unopposed	
Iowa House of Representatives elections, 2004; District 64; Turnout: 15,673	Democratic hold	Janet Petersen*	Democratic	9,876	63.0
Iowa House of Representatives elections, 2004; District 64; Turnout: 15,673	Democratic hold	Eric Goranson	Republican	5,781	36.9
Iowa House of Representatives elections, 2006; District 64	Democratic hold	Janet Petersen*	Democratic	unopposed	
Iowa House of Representatives elections, 2008; District 64; Turnout: 15,323	Democratic hold	Janet Petersen*	Democratic	10,259	67.0
Iowa House of Representatives elections, 2008; District 64; Turnout: 15,323	Democratic hold	Steve Svejda	Republican	5,034	32.9
Iowa House of Representatives elections, 2010; District 64; Turnout: 12,376	Democratic hold	Janet Petersen*	Democratic	6,689	54.0
Iowa House of Representatives elections, 2010; District 64; Turnout: 12,376	Democratic hold	Dan Kennedy	Republican	3,626	29.3
Iowa House of Representatives elections, 2010; District 64; Turnout: 12,376	Democratic hold	Vicki Stogdill	Independent	1,490	12.0
Iowa Senate elections, 2012; District 18; Turnout: 28,968	Democratic (newly redistricted)	Janet Petersen	Democratic	18,954	69.2
Iowa Senate elections, 2012; District 18; Turnout: 28,968	Democratic (newly redistricted)	Jeff Chavannes	Republican	8,455	30.8
Iowa Senate elections, 2016; District 18	Democratic hold	Janet Petersen	Democratic	unopposed	

Iowa House of Representatives
Preceded by Jack Holveck	Member of the Iowa House of Representatives from the 72nd district 2001–2003	Succeeded by Rich Arnold
Preceded by Mark Smith	Member of the Iowa House of Representatives from the 64th district 2003–2013	Succeeded by Bruce Bearinger
Iowa Senate
Preceded by Liz Mathis	Member of the Iowa Senate from the 18th district 2013–present	Incumbent
Preceded by Rob Hogg	Minority Leader of the Iowa Senate; 2017–2021	Succeeded by Zach Wahls
