= Iowa's 52nd House of Representatives district =

American legislative district

House District 52
- Type: District of the Lower house
- Location: Iowa
- Representative: David Blom
- Parent organization: Iowa General Assembly

The 52nd District of the Iowa House of Representatives in the state of Iowa is part of Marshall County.

== Current elected officials ==
David Blom is the representative currently representing the district.

== Past representatives ==
The district has previously been represented by:

- Ulysses Sherman Alderman, 1919–1921
- Richard Norpel, 1971–1973
- Louis A. Peterson, 1973–1975
- Lyle Scheelhaase, 1975–1979
- Warren Johnson, 1979–1983
- Doris Ann Peick, 1983–1987
- Ron Corbett, 1987–1999
- Patrick Shey, 1999–2003
- Mary Lou Freeman, 2003–2007
- Gary Worthan, 2007–2013
- Todd Prichard, 2013–2023
- Sue Cahill, 2021–2025
- David Blom, 2025–2027
- Mike Tupper, 2027–Present
