= David Blom =

American politician

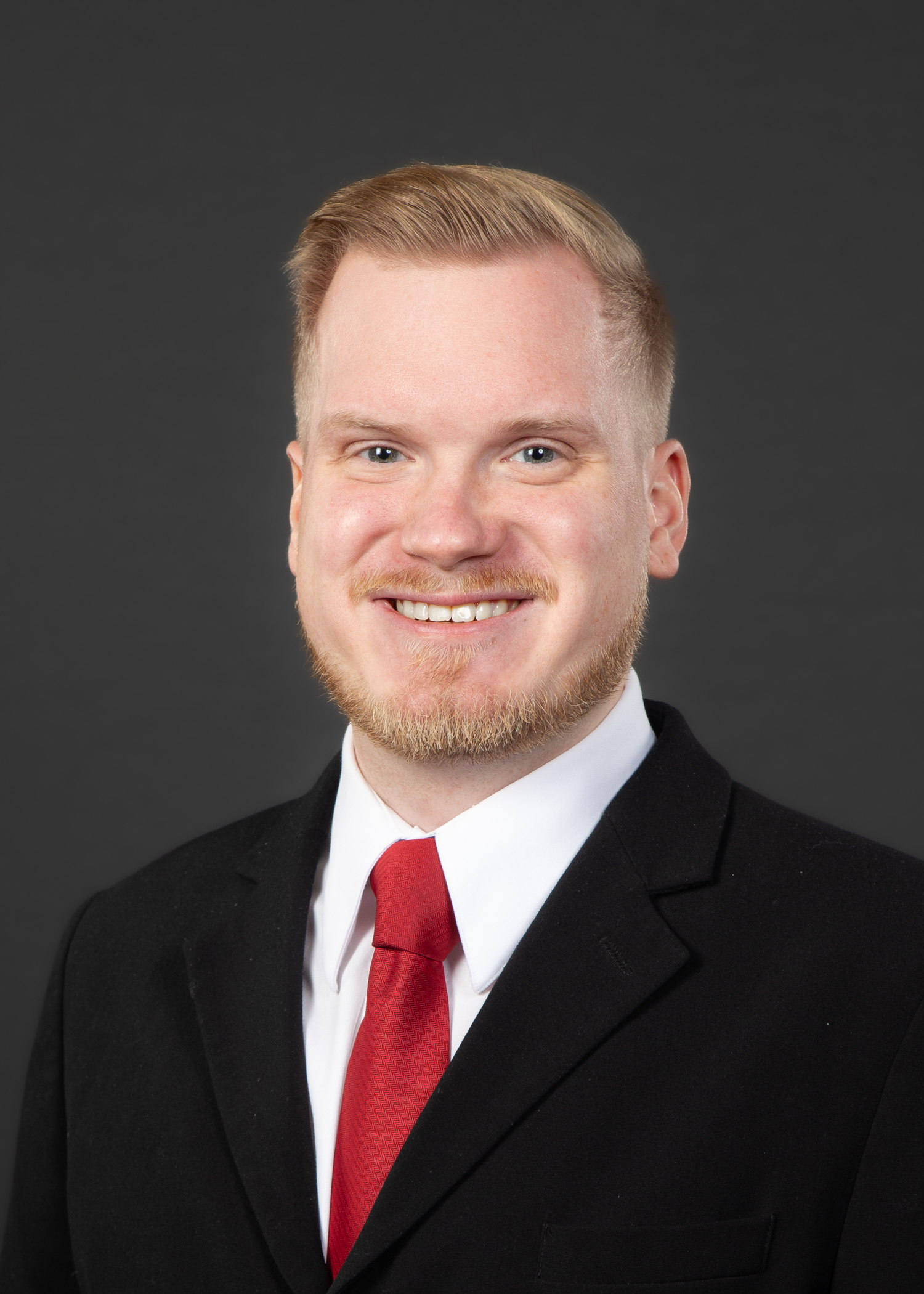

Member of the Iowa House of Representatives from the 52nd district
- In office January 13, 2025 – January 2027
- Preceded by: Sue Cahill
- Succeeded by: Mike Tupper

Personal details
- Born: 1998 (age 27–28) Marshalltown, Iowa
- Party: Republican
- Website: www.davidblom.com

David L. Blom (born 1998) is an American politician. He has served as a Republican member for the 52nd district in the Iowa House of Representatives since 2025.

Blom worked as a union sheet metal worker at Raymon Enterprises, a company affiliated with Sheet Metal Workers’ International Association Local 45. He joined the Iowa House in 2025 after ousting two-term Democratic incumbent Sue Cahill in the general election by a vote of 52%, flipping the Marshalltown House seat that had been held by Democrats for 24 years. Blom himself is from Marshalltown.

== Committee assignments ==
- Appropriations
- Commerce (vice chair)
- Local Government
- Veterans Affairs
