= Sharon Steckman =

American politician

Sharon S. Steckman
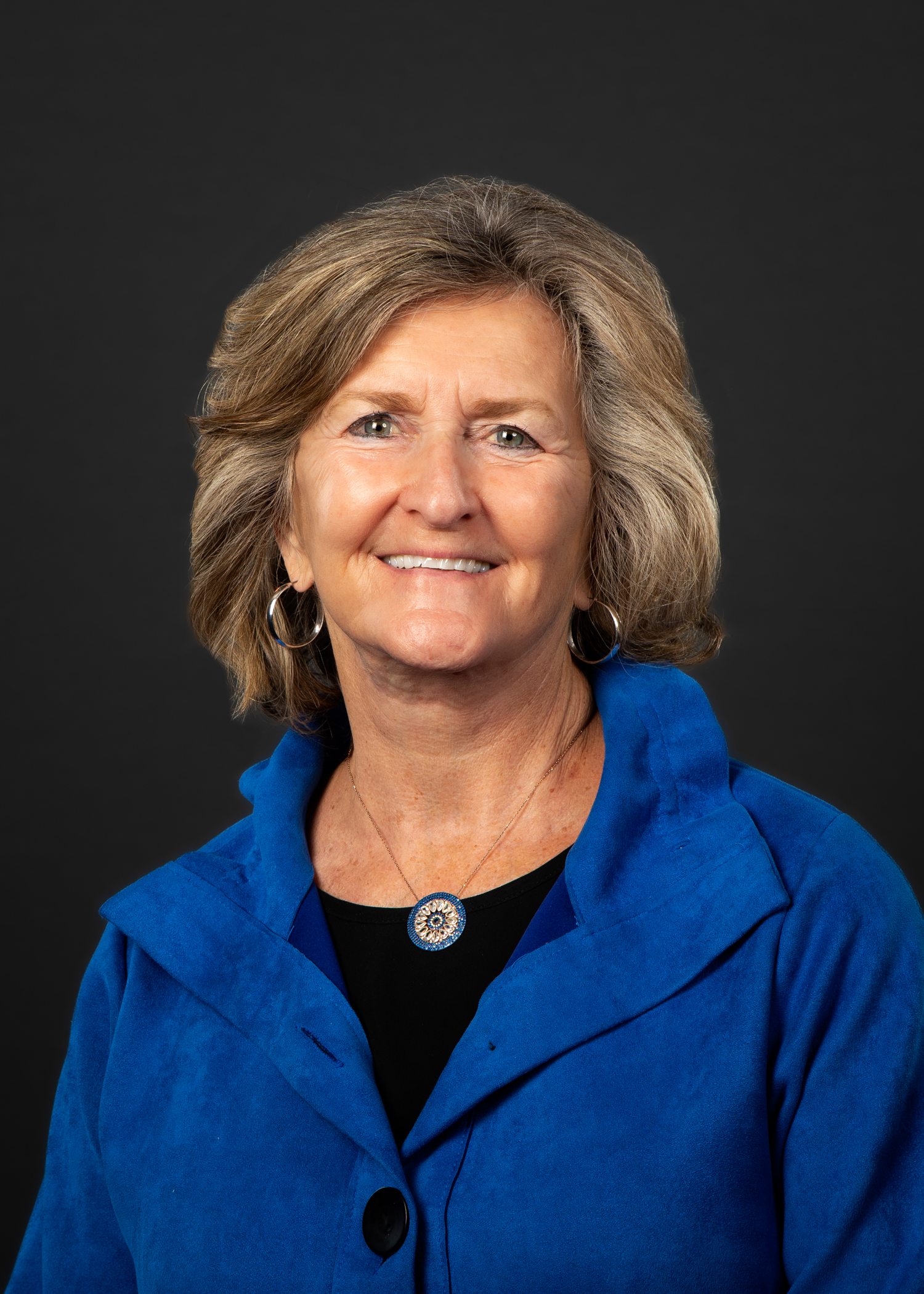

Member of the Iowa House of Representatives from the 59th district
- In office January 12, 2009 – January 12, 2025
- Preceded by: Bill Schickel
- Succeeded by: Christian Hermanson

Personal details
- Born: 1947 (age 78–79) Chicago, Illinois, U.S.
- Party: Democratic
- Spouse: Alan L. Steckman
- Children: Jon, Matthew, Lisa, Aaron nine grandchildren
- Education: B.S. Iowa State University; M.S. Morningside College
- Occupation: Iowa State Representative
- Profession: Retired educator

Sharon Sue Steckman (born 1947 in Chicago, Illinois) is an American politician who was a member of the Iowa House of Representatives from 2008 to 2025. She has a B.S. degree in education from Iowa State University and a M.S. degree, also in education, from Morningside College.

As of October 2011, Steckman is a member of several committees in the Iowa House – Ranking Chair of Education, State Government, Environmental Protection, and Education Appropriations committees. She is also the ranking member of the Education Committee and a member of the Midwestern Higher Education Compact. In October 2009, she was elected Assistant House Majority Leader, becoming Assistant House Minority Leader when the Democrats lost their majority in 2011.

== Electoral history ==
*incumbent

Election	Political result	Candidate	Party	Votes	%
Iowa House of Representatives primary elections, 2008; District 13; Turnout: 1,390	Democratic	Sharon Steckman	Democratic	1,092	78.6
Iowa House of Representatives primary elections, 2008; District 13; Turnout: 1,390	Democratic	Lionel L. Foster, Sr.	Democratic	177	12.7
Iowa House of Representatives primary elections, 2008; District 13; Turnout: 1,390	Democratic	Texas W. Newman	Democratic	101	7.3
Iowa House of Representatives elections, 2008; District 13; Turnout: 14,659	Democratic gain from Republican	Sharon Steckman	Democratic	8,366	57.1
Iowa House of Representatives elections, 2008; District 13; Turnout: 14,659	Democratic gain from Republican	Scott Tornquist	Republican	6,267	42.8
Iowa House of Representatives elections, 2010; District 13; Turnout: 10,382	Democratic hold	Sharon Steckman*	Democratic	6,235	60.1
Iowa House of Representatives elections, 2010; District 13; Turnout: 10,382	Democratic hold	Brian R. Randall	Republican	4,011	38.6

Iowa House of Representatives
Preceded by Bob Kressig	59th District; 2023–2025	Succeeded by Christian Hermanson
Preceded by Dan Huseman	53rd District; 2013–2023	Succeeded by Dean Fisher
Preceded by Bill Schickel	13th District; 2009–2013	Succeeded by Chris Hall
