= Christian Hermanson =

American politician

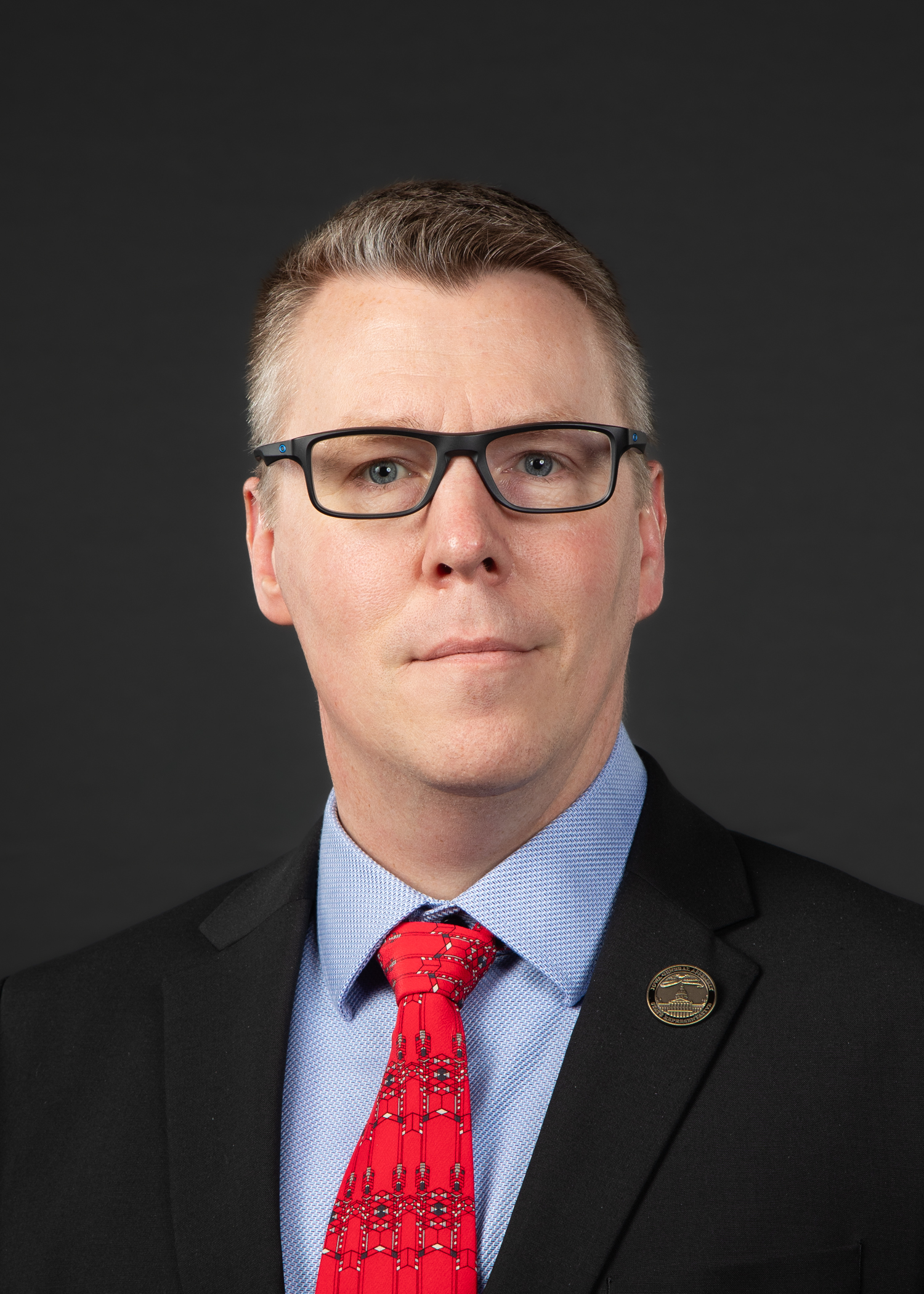
- Official portrait, 2025

Member of the Iowa House of Representatives from the 59th district
- Incumbent
- Assumed office January 13, 2025
- Preceded by: Sharon Steckman
- Succeeded by: Jacob Welper (elect)

Personal details
- Party: Republican

Christian A. Hermanson is an American politician who serves as a Republican member of the Iowa House of Representatives.

Born near Scarville, Iowa, Hermanson Hermanson served for 29 years in the United States Air Force, attaining the rank of chief master sergeant, retiring in 2024. He began campaigning for District 59 of the Iowa House of Representatives in March 2024, after Sharon Steckman had announced her retirement. Hermanson won the 2024 general election against Jeremy True with 51.1% of the vote.

In the House, Hermanson serves as vice chair of the Ways and Means Committee, and is a member of the Natural Resources, Public Safety, and Veterans Affairs Committees, as well as the Transportation, Infrastructure, and Capitals Appropriations Subcommittee.
