= Beverly Nelson =

American politician (born 1929)

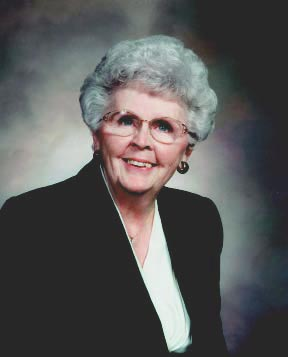

Member of the Iowa House of Representatives
- In office January 9, 1995 – January 7, 2001

Personal details
- Born: Beverly Joan Dunn; June 2, 1929 Clemons, Iowa, U.S.
- Died: February 12, 2025 (aged 95) Clear Lake, Iowa, U.S.
- Party: Republican
- Spouse(s): Richard Russel Nelson (died) Richard Forbes (m. 1999)
- Education: Iowa State University
- Occupation: academic

Beverly Joan Nelson-Forbes (née Dunn; July 2, 1929 – February 12, 2025) was an American politician in the state of Iowa. Nelson was born in Clemons, Iowa. She attended the Mercy School of Nursing (Dubuque), University of Iowa (B.S.N.), and Iowa State University (M.S. and PhD). A Republican, she served in the Iowa House of Representatives from 1995 to 2001 (64th district). She died on February 12, 2025.
