= Jennifer Konfrst =

American politician (born 1973)

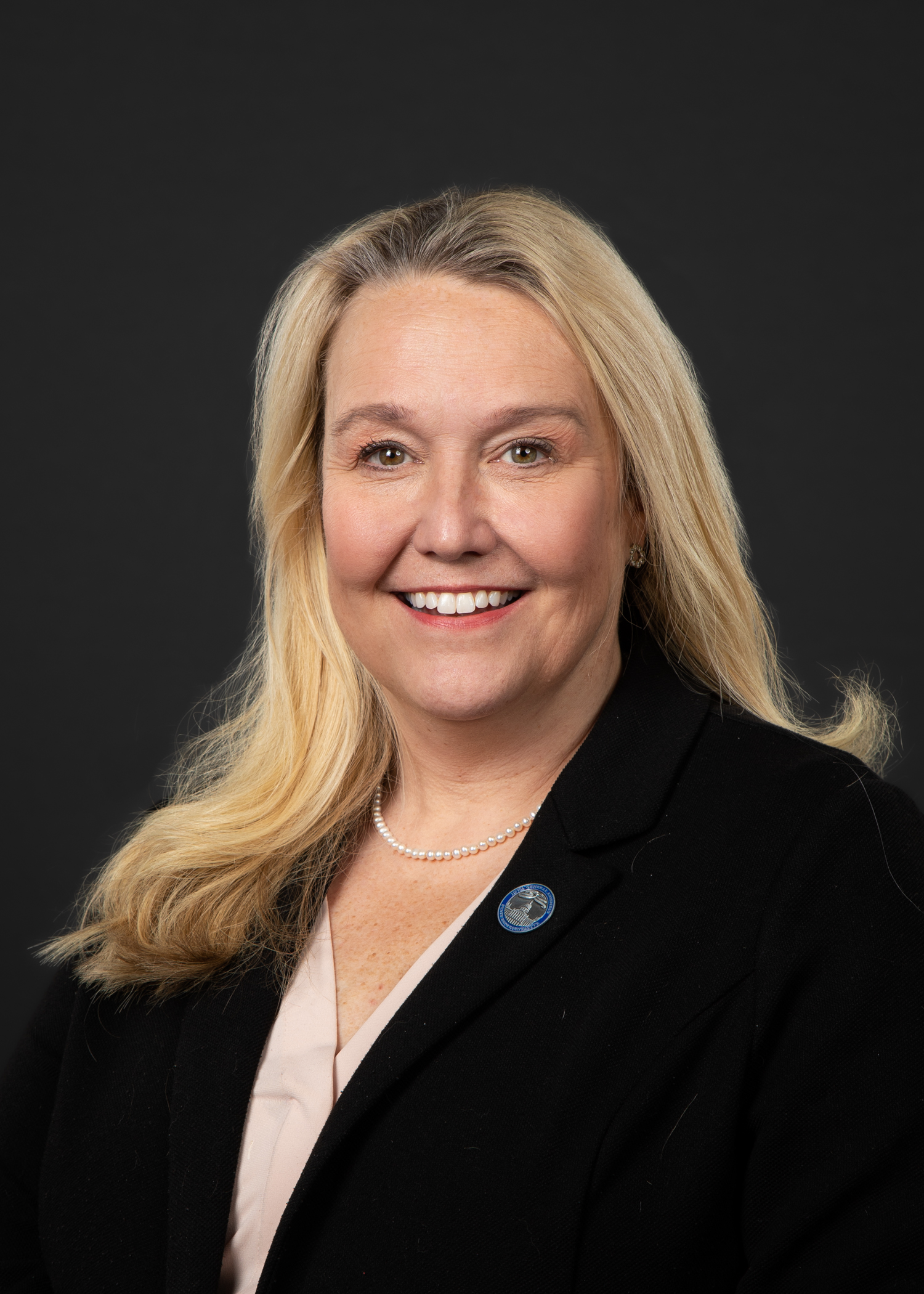

Minority Leader of the Iowa House of Representatives
- In office June 14, 2021 – May 15, 2025
- Preceded by: Todd Prichard
- Succeeded by: Brian Meyer
- Constituency: 43rd district (2019–2023); 32nd district (2023–present)

Member of the Iowa House of Representatives from the 32nd district
- Incumbent
- Assumed office January 14, 2019
- Preceded by: Chris Hagenow

Personal details
- Born: December 24, 1973 (age 52) Macomb, Illinois, U.S.
- Party: Democratic
- Spouse: Lee
- Children: 2
- Education: Drake University (BA, MPA)

Jennifer Glover Konfrst (born December 24, 1973) is an American politician in the state of Iowa. A Democrat, she has been a member of the Iowa House of Representatives representing the 32nd district since 2019. She served as House minority leader from 2021 to 2025.

== Early life ==
Konfrst was born on December 24, 1973, in Macomb, Illinois. She grew up in Des Moines, Iowa, Fort Dodge, Iowa, and Webster, Florida. She graduated with a bachelors of arts degree in journalism and mass communications and a masters of public administration from Drake University. She worked for Iowa PBS for twelve years. She is an associate professor of journalism and strategic political communication at Drake University.

== Political career ==
=== Iowa House of Representatives ===
She first ran to represent the 43rd district in the Iowa House of Representatives in 2016, but lost to Republican incumbent Chris Hagenow. In 2018, Hagenow moved to the 19th district. Konfrst ran again for the newly-open seat and won. She won re-election in 2020. Konfrst sits on the administration and rules committee, the judiciary committee, the local government committee, the state government committee and the transportation committee. She was the assistant minority leader in 2019 and 2020 and the minority whip in 2021. When Todd Prichard stepped down as the House minority leader in 2021, Konfrst was elected on June 14, 2021, as the new House minority leader. She was the first woman to hold this position in Iowa.

In 2022, she ran for re-election and won in the 32nd district against Republican Mark Brown.

After suspending her campaign for U.S. House, Konfrst still gave her retirement speech to the Iowa House on April 7, 2026, and will depart at the end of the session.

=== 2026 U.S. House campaign ===
On May 8, 2025, Konfrst announced her candidacy for Iowa's 3rd congressional district in the U.S. House of Representatives, seeking the Democratic nomination to challenge incumbent Republican representative Zach Nunn. On January 26, 2026 she suspended her campaign and endorsed Sarah Trone Garriott.

== Personal life ==
She and her husband, Lee, have two children.

=== Electoral history ===
2016 general election: Iowa House of Representatives, District 43
Party	Candidate	Votes	%
Republican	Chris Hagenow	8,809	51.57%
Democratic	Jennifer Konfrst	8,273	48.43%

2018 general election: Iowa House of Representatives, District 43
Party	Candidate	Votes	%
Democratic	Jennifer Konfrst	8,852	56.7%
Republican	Michael Boal	6,431	41.2%
Libertarian	Chad Brewbaker	318	2.0%
	Other/Write-in	11	0.1%

Iowa House of Representatives
Preceded by Todd Prichard	Minority Leader of the Iowa House of Representatives; 2021–2025	Succeeded by Brian Meyer
