= Charles Isenhart =

American politician

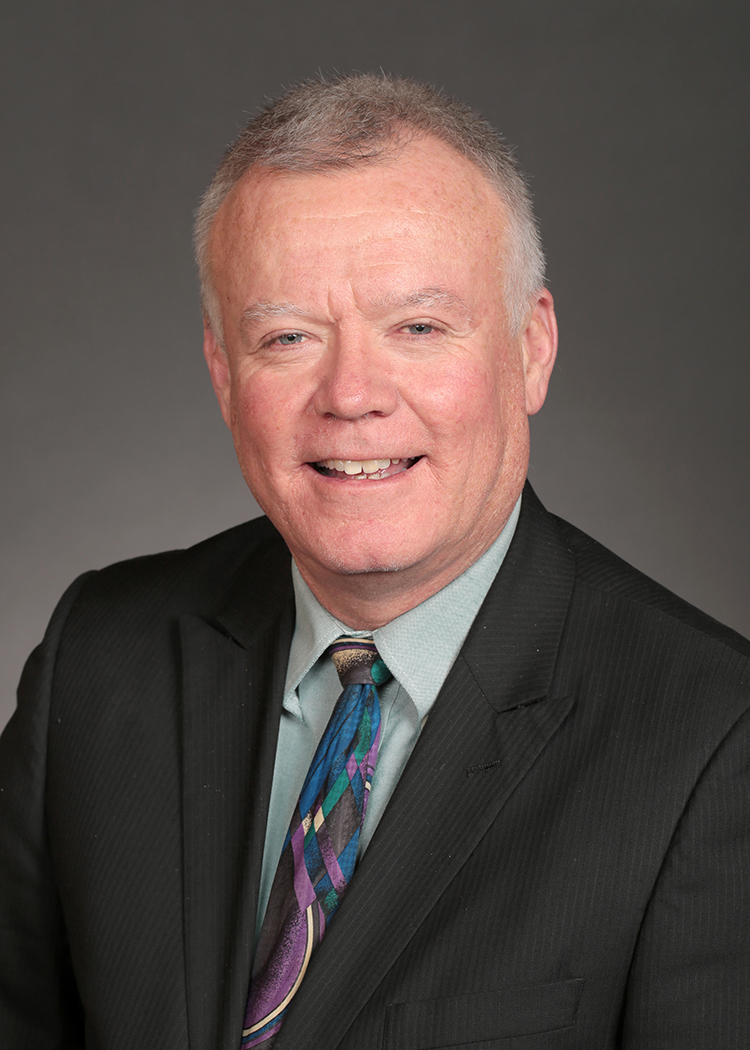

Member of the Iowa House of Representatives from the 72nd district
- In office 2008–2025
- Succeeded by: Jennifer Smith

Personal details
- Born: March 30, 1959 (age 67) Dubuque, Iowa, U.S.
- Party: Democratic

Charles William Isenhart (born March 30, 1959, in Dubuque, Iowa) is an American politician. A Democrat, he represented the 72nd District in the Iowa House of Representatives from 2008 to 2025.

== Education ==
Isenhart graduated from Wahlert High School and in 1981 obtained his degree in political science and mass communications from Loras College. In 1984 he received his master's degree in journalism from Marquette University.

== Career ==
Outside politics Isenhart owns a small business called Common Good Services. From 1990 to 2007, he was executive director of the Dubuque Area Labor-Management Council.

== Organizations ==
Isenhart has been or is currently a member of the following organizations:

=== Professional ===
- Labor and Employment Relations Association
- National Business Coalition on Health
- Iowa 2010 Strategic Planning Council
- Iowans for a Better Future Board of Directors
- Governor's 21st Century Workforce Council
- Federal Mediation and Conciliation Service Customer Council

=== Community ===
- Dubuque Housing Commission
- Dubuque Community Development Commission
- Dubuque County Mental Health/Developmental Disabilities Stakeholders Committee
- Dubuque Soccer Club
- American Youth Soccer Organization
- America's River Soccer Classic
- Dubuque Housing Coalition
- Healthy Dubuque 2000
- Crescent Community Health Center Planning Committee
- Downtown Neighborhood Council
- St. Raphael Cathedral Parish
- Habitat for Humanity board
- Project Concern
- Dubuque Food Pantry
- Dubuque Soccer Alliance

Iowa House of Representatives
Preceded by Dean Fisher	72nd District; 2023 – 2025	Succeeded by Jennifer Smith
Preceded by	100th District; 2013 – 2023	Succeeded by Martin Graber
Preceded by	27th District; 2009-2013	Succeeded by
