= Virgil Corey =

American politician (1916–2008)

Member of the Iowa House of Representatives from the 55th district
- In office January 10, 1983 – January 8, 1989
- Preceded by: Karen Mann
- Succeeded by: Mark Shearer

Member of the Iowa House of Representatives from the 83rd district
- In office January 8, 1979 – January 9, 1983
- Preceded by: Arnold R. Lindeen
- Succeeded by: Lyle R. Krewson

Personal details
- Born: September 23, 1916 Morning Sun, Iowa
- Died: July 27, 2008 (aged 91) Wapello, Iowa
- Party: Republican

Virgil Corey (September 23, 1916 – July 27, 2008) was an American politician who served in the Iowa House of Representatives from 1979 to 1989.

He died on July 27, 2008, in Wapello, Iowa, at age 91.
