= Phillip Tyrrell =

American politician

Member of the Iowa House of Representatives
- In office 1979–2003

Personal details
- Born: June 19, 1932 Anthon, Iowa, United States
- Died: April 9, 2012 (aged 79) North English, Iowa, United States
- Party: Republican
- Occupation: insurance agent

Phillip E. Tyrrell (June 19, 1932 – April 9, 2012) was an American politician in the state of Iowa.

Tyrrell was born in Anthon, Iowa. He was an insurance agent. He served in the Iowa House of Representatives from 1979 to 2003, as a Republican. He died in 2012.
