= Kevin McCarthy (Iowa politician) =

American politician (born 1971)

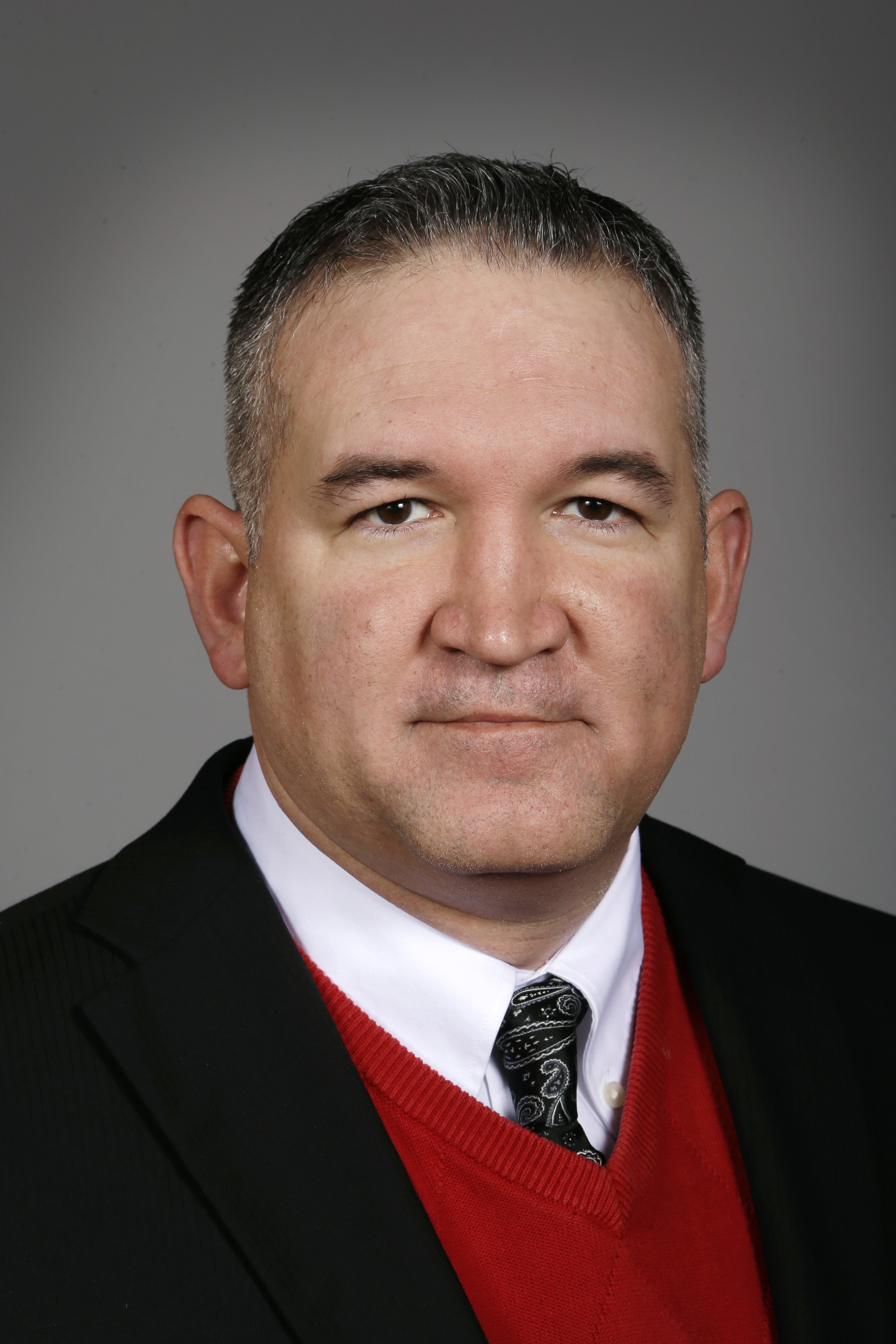

Member of the Iowa House of Representatives from the 33rd district
- In office 2003–2013
- Preceded by: Frank Chiodo
- Succeeded by: Brian Meyer

Personal details
- Born: June 29, 1971 (age 55) Des Moines, Iowa, U.S.
- Party: Democratic
- Spouse: Marcy McCarthy
- Children: 1
- Education: Wartburg College(BA); Drake University (JD)
- Profession: Attorney
- Website: McCarthy's website

Kevin M. McCarthy (born June 29, 1971) is an American Democratic legislator who served in the Iowa House of Representatives from 2003 until 2013 and, for his last two years there, was the House Minority Leader. McCarthy was born, raised, and resides in Des Moines, Iowa. He received his B.A. from Wartburg College and his J.D. from Drake University.

The son of former Des Moines Police Chief and former Polk County Sheriff Bill McCarthy, he resigned in August 2013 to take a position with the Iowa Attorney General's office.

== Electoral history ==
*incumbent

72nd District contest

Election	Political result	Candidate	Party	Votes	%
Iowa House of Representatives primary elections, 2000; District 72; Turnout: 3,228	Democratic	Janet Petersen	Democratic	1,897	58.77%
Iowa House of Representatives primary elections, 2000; District 72; Turnout: 3,228	Democratic	Kevin McCarthy	Democratic	1,289	39.93%
Iowa House of Representatives primary elections, 2000; District 72; Turnout: 3,228	Democratic	Bruce L. Wilson	Democratic	37	1.14%

Early 67th District contests

Election	Political result	Candidate	Party	Votes	%
Iowa House of Representatives primary elections, 2002; District 67; Turnout: 1,758	Democratic	Kevin McCarthy	Democratic	883	50.23%
Iowa House of Representatives primary elections, 2002; District 67; Turnout: 1,758	Democratic	Brenden Greiner	Democratic	510	29.01%
Iowa House of Representatives primary elections, 2002; District 67; Turnout: 1,758	Democratic	Becky Morelock	Democratic	364	20.71%
Iowa House of Representatives general elections, 2002; District 67; Turnout: 8,511	Democratic (newly redistricted)	Kevin McCarthy	Democratic	5,385	63.27%
Iowa House of Representatives general elections, 2002; District 67; Turnout: 8,511	Democratic (newly redistricted)	Steven Pritchard	Republican	3,109	36.53%
Iowa House of Representatives primary elections, 2004; District 67; Turnout: 1,070	Democratic	Kevin McCarthy*	Democratic	794	74.21%
Iowa House of Representatives primary elections, 2004; District 67; Turnout: 1,070	Democratic	Bill Thompson	Democratic	273	25.51%
Iowa House of Representatives general elections, 2004; District 67; Turnout: 12,939	Democratic hold	Kevin McCarthy*	Democratic	8,433	65.18%
Iowa House of Representatives general elections, 2004; District 67; Turnout: 12,939	Democratic hold	Steven Paul Pritchard	Republican	4,488	34.69%
Iowa House of Representatives primary elections, 2006; District 67	Democratic	Kevin McCarthy*	Democratic	unopposed	
Iowa House of Representatives general elections, 2006; District 67; Turnout: 9.339	Democratic hold	Kevin McCarthy*	Democratic	5,656	60.56%
Iowa House of Representatives general elections, 2006; District 67; Turnout: 9.339	Democratic hold	Steven Inman	Republican	3,191	34.17%
Iowa House of Representatives general elections, 2006; District 67; Turnout: 9.339	Democratic hold	Brian McClain	Independent	487	5.21%

Election	Political result	Candidate	Party	Votes	%
Iowa House of Representatives primary elections, 2008; District 67	Democratic	Kevin McCarthy*	Democratic	unopposed	
Iowa House of Representatives general elections, 2008; District 67; Turnout: 15,285	Democratic hold	Kevin McCarthy*	Democratic	9,412	61.58%
Iowa House of Representatives general elections, 2008; District 67; Turnout: 15,285	Democratic hold	Larry Disney	Republican	5,204	34.05%
Iowa House of Representatives primary elections, 2010; District 67	Democratic	Kevin McCarthy*	Democratic	unopposed	
Iowa House of Representatives general elections, 2010; District 67; Turnout: 10,928	Democratic hold	Kevin McCarthy*	Democratic	6,226	56.97%
Iowa House of Representatives general elections, 2010; District 67; Turnout: 10,928	Democratic hold	Jeremy L. Walters	Republican	4,173	38.17%
Iowa House of Representatives primary elections, 2012; District 33	Democratic	Kevin McCarthy*	Democratic	unopposed	
Iowa House of Representatives general elections, 2012; District 33; Turnout: 12,834	Democratic (newly redistricted)	Kevin McCarthy*	Democratic	8,772	68.35%
Iowa House of Representatives general elections, 2012; District 33; Turnout: 12,834	Democratic (newly redistricted)	Daniel G. LeRette	Republican	3,303	25.74%

Iowa House of Representatives
Preceded by Frank Chiodo	67th District; 2003–2013	Succeeded by Kraig Paulsen
Preceded by Kirsten Running-Marquardt	33rd District; 2013	Succeeded by Brian Meyer
