= Brian Meyer (politician) =

American lawyer and politician (born 1973)

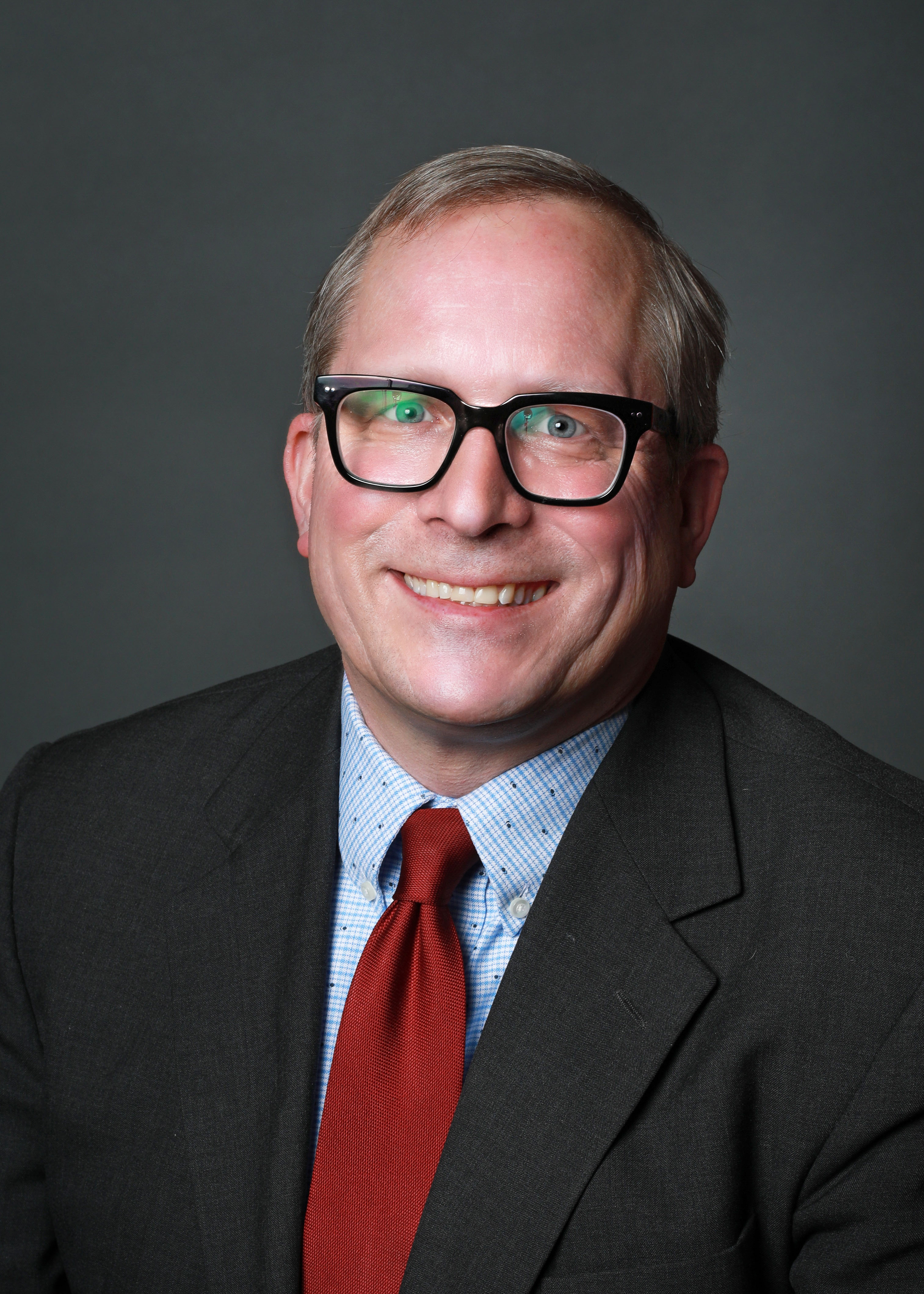

Minority Leader of the Iowa House of Representatives
- Incumbent
- Assumed office May 15, 2025
- Preceded by: Jennifer Konfrst

Member of the Iowa House of Representatives from the 29th district
- Incumbent
- Assumed office November 1, 2013
- Preceded by: Kevin McCarthy

Personal details
- Born: November 1, 1973 (age 52) Dubuque, Iowa, U.S.
- Party: Democratic
- Spouse: Ann Rossmiller
- Children: 2
- Education: University of Northern Iowa (BA); Drake University (JD)
- Website: State House website

Brian Meyer (born 1973) is an American lawyer and politician from the state of Iowa. A member of the Democratic Party, Meyer serves in the Iowa House of Representatives, representing the 29th district. He previously served on the Des Moines, Iowa City Council.

He was elected as the next state house minority leader pending the completion of the May 2025 session.

== Background ==
Meyer was born in Dubuque, Iowa. He graduated from Dubuque Senior High School, the University of Northern Iowa and Drake University Law School. He served in the Iowa National Guard. In 1998, Meyer married Ann Rossmiller. They have two children.

He served as an assistant Iowa attorney general and assistant Polk County attorney. He was elected to the Des Moines City Council in 2007.

== Iowa House of Representatives ==
Meyer ran in a special election for the 33rd district in the Iowa House of Representatives. He defeated the Republican Party candidate, Michael Young, in the election on October 22, 2013. He succeeded Kevin McCarthy, who resigned the seat in the Iowa House to work for the Attorney General of Iowa. He was sworn in on November 1. Since 2025, he has served as the Democratic Minority Leader of the House.

=== Committee assignments ===
- Administration and Rules (ranking member)
- Capital Projects Committee
- Legislative Council
- Service Committee

Iowa House of Representatives
Preceded by Jennifer Konfrst	Minority Leader of the Iowa House of Representatives; 2025–present	Incumbent
