= Dennis E. Butler =

American politician (born 1940)

Member of the Iowa House of Representatives from the 99th district
- In office January 8, 1973 – January 12, 1975
- Preceded by: Floyd Millen
- Succeeded by: Emil Pavich

Personal details
- Born: February 9, 1940 (age 86) Lenox, Iowa, U.S.
- Party: Republican
- Education: Abraham Lincoln High School; University of Missouri
- Occupation: Politician

Military service
- Allegiance: United States
- Branch/service: United States Navy

Dennis E. Butler (born February 9, 1940) is an American politician.

Butler was born to E. A. and Elizabeth Butler on February 9, 1940. The family moved from his birthplace in Lenox, Iowa, to Council Bluffs, where he graduated from Abraham Lincoln High School 1958. Butler then earned a bachelor's degree in political science from the University of Missouri in 1962.

He served in the United States Navy for four years becoming a lieutenant junior grade. He obtained his certification as a teacher in 1969 at the University of Nebraska–Omaha. He taught social studies and debate at schools in Council Bluffs. In 1972, Butler was elected to the Iowa House of Representatives. He was affiliated with the Republican Party and represented District 99 for a single term.
