= Easington, Oxfordshire =

Easington, Oxfordshire may refer to:

- Easington, Cherwell
- Easington, South Oxfordshire
