= George Pierson =

George Pierson may refer to:

- George Nelson Pierson (1904–1989), American politician in Iowa
- George Wilson Pierson (1904–1993), American historian

== See also ==
- George Pearson (disambiguation)
