= Tim Goodwin (Iowa politician) =

American politician

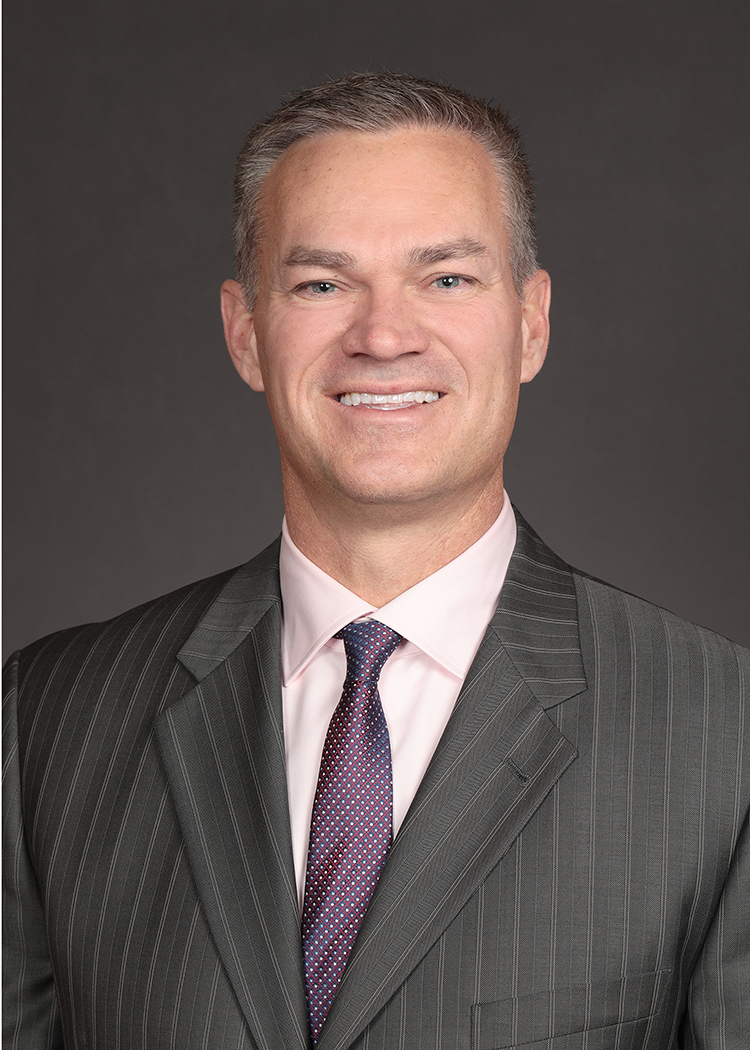

Member of the Iowa Senate from the 44th district
- In office January 11, 2021 – January 8, 2023
- Preceded by: Thomas Greene
- Succeeded by: Adrian Dickey (numerical); Jeff Reichman (geographical)

Personal details
- Born: Burlington, Iowa, U.S.
- Party: Republican
- Spouse: Tina
- Children: 3
- Education: Western Illinois University (BA, MA)

Tim Goodwin is an American politician who last served as member of the Iowa Senate from the 44th district. Elected in November 2020, he assumed office on January 11, 2021 until his resignation on January 8, 2023.

== Career ==
Goodwin began his career in public relations for the Boston Celtics and New York Knicks. He then became a school administrator and coach in Williamsburg, Iowa. He was also the director of administration and development for WW Transport, Inc., a trucking company based in West Burlington, Iowa.

Goodwin challenged incumbent Democratic State Representative Dennis Cohoon in 2018. Goodwin's opponent in the Republican primary withdrew and Goodwin won with 74% of the vote. Cohoon defeated Goodwin in the general election.

He was elected to the Iowa Senate in 2020 from the 44th district. He served as vice chair of the Senate Ways and Means Committee. Goodwin ran for the seat held by retiring Senator Tom Greene and he defeated Matthew Rinker in the primary with 67% of the vote. In the general election, Goodwin defeated former state senator Thomas G. Courtney with 57% of the vote. Courtney had previously held the 44th district before being defeated by Tom Greene in 2016.

In January 2022, Goodwin announced he would resign at the end of the year. During Iowa's decennial redistricting, Goodwin was drawn into a district with fellow Republican Jeff Reichman. Had Goodwin chosen not to resign, he would have faced Reichman in an election later that year. Goodwin's resignation became official on January 8, 2023.

Goodwin later served as a senior advisor to the Ron DeSantis 2024 presidential campaign.

== Personal life ==
Goodwin was born and raised in Burlington, Iowa. He earned a Bachelor of Arts degree in physical education and Master of Arts in sports management from Western Illinois University. Goodwin is a Methodist. He is married to Tina and they have three children, two daughters and one son.

== Electoral history ==
Election results of Tim Goodwin
Year	Office	District	Election	Party	Votes	%	Opponent	Party	Votes	%	Opponent	Party	Votes	%
2018	Iowa House of Representatives	87	Primary	R	446	74.71%	Travis A. Ingraham	R	96	16.08%	Write-ins	W-I	4	0.67%
2018	Iowa House of Representatives	87	General	R	4,596	42.73%	Dennis Cohoon	D	6,010	55.87%	Write-ins	W-I	7	0.07%
2020	Iowa Senate	44	Primary	R	3,217	67.71%	Matthew Rinker	R	1,277	26.88%	Write-ins	W-I	15	0.32%
2020	Iowa Senate	44	General	R	16,447	54.86%	Thomas G. Courtney	D	12,493	41.67%	Write-ins	W-I	50	0.17%
