= Pavich =

Pavich is a surname. Notable people with the surname include:

- Emil Pavich (1931–2005), American politician
- Frank Pavich, Croatian-American film director and producer

== See also ==
- Pavić
