= Matthew Rinker =

American politician (born 1984)

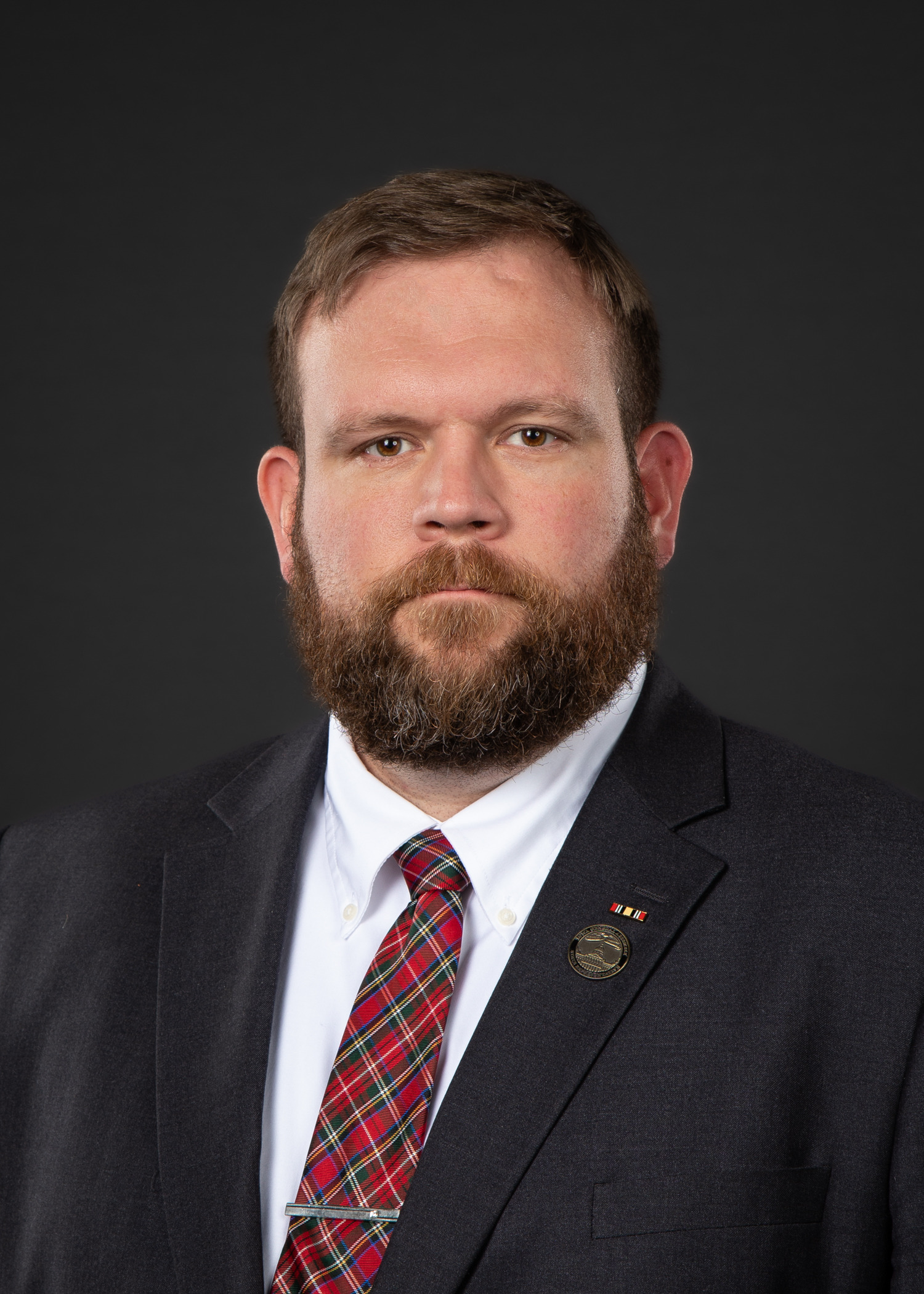
- Official portrait, 2023

Member of the Iowa House of Representatives from the 99th district
- Incumbent
- Assumed office January 9, 2023
- Preceded by: Lindsay James (redistricting)
- Succeeded by: Jennifer Kirkman (elect)

Personal details
- Born: 1984 (age 41–42) Burlington, Iowa, U.S.
- Party: Republican
- Spouse: Sophie Vincent (m. 2009)
- Children: 4
- Education: Southeastern Community College (AA); Western Illinois University (BA)
- Occupation: Insurance agent, small business owner

Matthew Benjamin Rinker (born 1984) is an American politician, insurance agent, and small business owner who has represented the 99th district of the Iowa House of Representatives since January 2023, which covers southern Des Moines County and northeast Lee County, including all of Burlington and West Burlington. He is a member of the Republican Party.

== Early life and education ==
Rinker was born in 1984 in Burlington, Iowa, and was the second of four children. His father worked in law enforcement while his mother was a factory worker. He was raised in Burlington and graduated from Burlington High School in 2003. In 2004, he joined the United States Navy, and was deployed to places like California, Texas, Greece, Japan, Iraq, and Kuwait. He reached the rank of master-at-arms petty officer first class.

After leaving active duty in 2008, Rinker attended Southeastern Community College, where he received an Associate of Arts in public policy, and Western Illinois University, where he received a Bachelor of Arts in political science and economics. He was honorably discharged from the Navy in 2012.

== Political career ==
Rinker was elected to the Burlington City Council in 2017, and was reelected in 2021. He resigned upon his election to the Iowa House.

Rinker challenged Tim Goodwin in the Republican primary election for district 44 of the Iowa Senate on June 2, 2020, and was defeated by over 1,900 votes.

Rinker announced his candidacy for the 99th district of the Iowa House of Representatives following decennial redistricting in 2021. He won the Republican primary on June 7, 2022, by 10 points and faced long-time Democratic incumbent Dennis Cohoon (Note: Cohoon was redistricted into the 99th district during his term in 2021; he had previously been representing the 87th district) in the general election on November 8. A recount was ordered shortly after the election due to an issue with the absentee vote count, and the results were finalized on November 15 with Rinker winning by over 400 votes.

Rinker endorsed Ron DeSantis for president in 2023.

Rinker filed to run for reelection in 2024. He won the Republican primary unopposed on June 4, 2024, and faced Democrat Jim Beres in the general election on November 5, 2024, whom he defeated by over 1,500 votes.

Rinker again ran for reelection in 2026, and won the Republican primary unopposed on June 2, 2026. He was challenged by Democrat Jennifer Kirkman in the general election on November 3, 2026, who defeated him by over 1,100 votes.

During his time in the House, Rinker served on the Local Government, Public Safety, Labor and Workforce, and Veterans Affairs committees, the lattermost of which he served as vice chairman.

Rinker's platform primarily aligned with conservative positions. He opposes abortion, except for cases of rape, incest, and endangerment of the mother, and supports the Second Amendment. He is in favor of expanding medical marijuana but opposes the legalization of recreational marijuana. He also supports lowering taxes and has voiced support for Republican governor Kim Reynolds' ecnonomic policies.

== Personal life ==
Rinker married Sophie Vincent in 2009. She is from England, and they met while he was deployed overseas. They have four children together, while another child died during childbirth in 2016. He resides with his family in Burlington. He is Catholic.

Rinker is an insurance agent and was first employed by Shelter Insurance in 2013. He later left Shelter Insurance and has since worked for State Farm. He is licensed in Iowa, Illinois, Minnesota, and Missouri. He has also been active as a local property developer since 2016.

Rinker has served as president of the Burlington Rotary Club and of Southeast Iowa Shop With a Cop. He has also served on the executive council of the Boy Scouts of America Mississippi Valley Council and has been a member of the Burlington Education Foundation and the Burlington Baseball Association.

== Electoral history ==
* = incumbent

Election	Political result	Candidate	Party	Votes	%
Iowa Senate Republican primary elections, 2020; District 44; Turnout: 4,509	Republican	Tim Goodwin	Republican	3,217	71.3
Iowa Senate Republican primary elections, 2020; District 44; Turnout: 4,509	Republican	Matthew Rinker	Republican	1,277	28.3
Iowa Senate Republican primary elections, 2020; District 44; Turnout: 4,509	Republican	Other/Write-in votes		15	0.3
Iowa House of Representatives Republican primary elections, 2022; District 99; Turnout: 1,325	Republican (newly redistricted)	Matthew Rinker	Republican	728	54.9
Iowa House of Representatives Republican primary elections, 2022; District 99; Turnout: 1,325	Republican (newly redistricted)	TJ Widbin	Republican	595	44.9
Iowa House of Representatives Republican primary elections, 2022; District 99; Turnout: 1,325	Republican (newly redistricted)	Other/Write-in votes		2	0.2
Iowa House of Representatives general elections, 2022; District 99; Turnout: 10,501	Republican (newly redistricted)	Matthew Rinker	Republican	5,468	52.1
Iowa House of Representatives general elections, 2022; District 99; Turnout: 10,501	Republican (newly redistricted)	Dennis Cohoon*	Democratic	5,007	47.7
Iowa House of Representatives general elections, 2022; District 99; Turnout: 10,501	Republican (newly redistricted)	Other/Write-in votes		26	0.2
Iowa House of Representatives Republican primary elections, 2024; District 99; Turnout: 495	Republican	Matthew Rinker*	Republican	487	98.4
Iowa House of Representatives Republican primary elections, 2024; District 99; Turnout: 495	Republican	Other/Write-in votes		8	1.6
Iowa House of Representatives general elections, 2024; District 99; Turnout: 13,955	Republican	Matthew Rinker*	Republican	7,755	55.6
Iowa House of Representatives general elections, 2024; District 99; Turnout: 13,955	Republican	Jim Beres	Democratic	6,162	44.2
Iowa House of Representatives general elections, 2024; District 99; Turnout: 13,955	Republican	Other/Write-in votes		38	0.3
