= George Pearson =

George Pearson may refer to:

- George Pearson (doctor) (1751–1828), English physician and chemist
- George Pearson (filmmaker) (1875–1973), English film director, producer and screenwriter
- George Sharratt Pearson (1880–1966), politician in British Columbia, Canada
- George Pearson (cricketer) (1921–1983), English cricketer
- George Pearson Centre (1952–present), a residential care facility in Vancouver, British Columbia, Canada
- George F. Pearson (1799–1867), rear admiral in the United States Navy
- Mel Pearson (ice hockey, born 1938) (1938–1999), Canadian ice hockey player
- George Pearson (footballer) (1907–unknown), English footballer
- George Pearson (rugby union) (born 1916), Australian rugby player
- George Pearson (rugby union, born 2006), (born 2006) English rugby union player

== See also ==
- George Pierson (disambiguation)
