= Thomas Greene (Iowa politician) =

Iowa politician (born 1949)

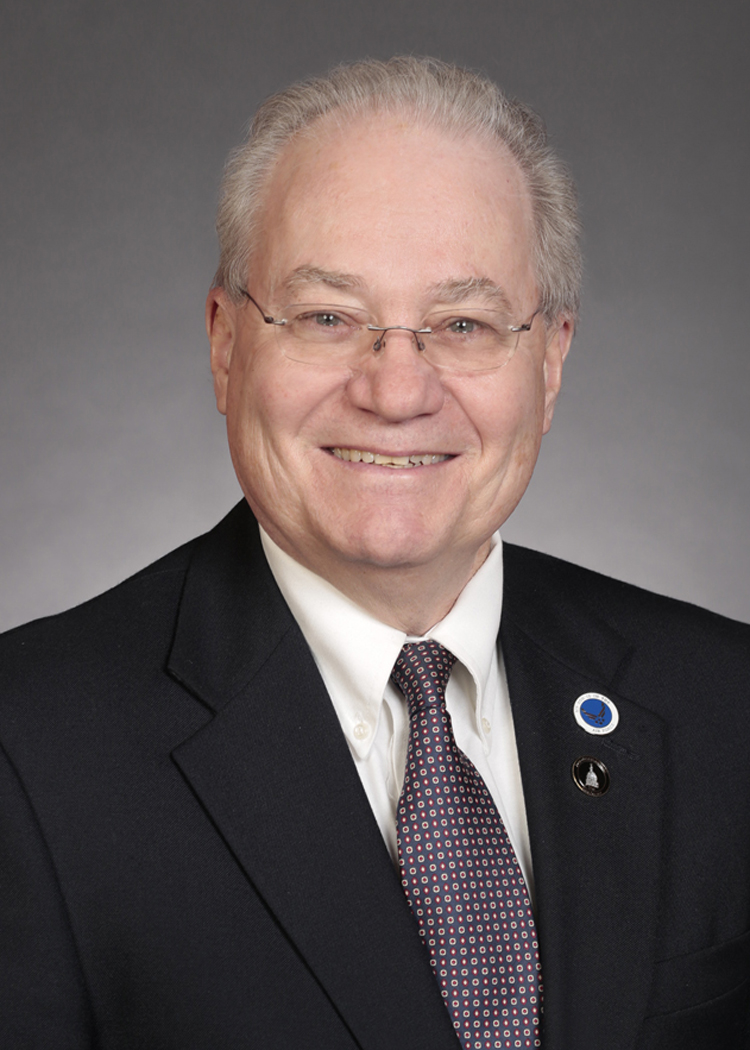

Member of the Iowa Senate from the 44th district
- In office January 9, 2017 – January 11, 2021
- Preceded by: Thomas G. Courtney
- Succeeded by: Tim Goodwin

Personal details
- Born: 1949 (age 76–77) Burlington, Iowa, U.S.
- Party: Republican
- Spouse: Linda
- Children: 4
- Website: Greene's website

Thomas A. Greene (born 1949) is an American politician and pharmacist who served as a member of the Iowa Senate for the 44th district from 2017 to 2021. A Republican, he was elected in 2017. He resides in Burlington, Iowa.

As of February 2017, Greene served on the following committees: Appropriations, Education, Human Resources, Local Government, and Transportation. He also served on the Economic Development Appropriations Subcommittee.

== Electoral history ==
Iowa Senate 44th District election, 2016
Party	Candidate	Votes	%
Republican	Thomas Greene	14,410	52.57%
Democratic	Thomas G. Courtney	13,000	47.43%
Republican gain from Democratic			
