= Richard Larkin =

American politician

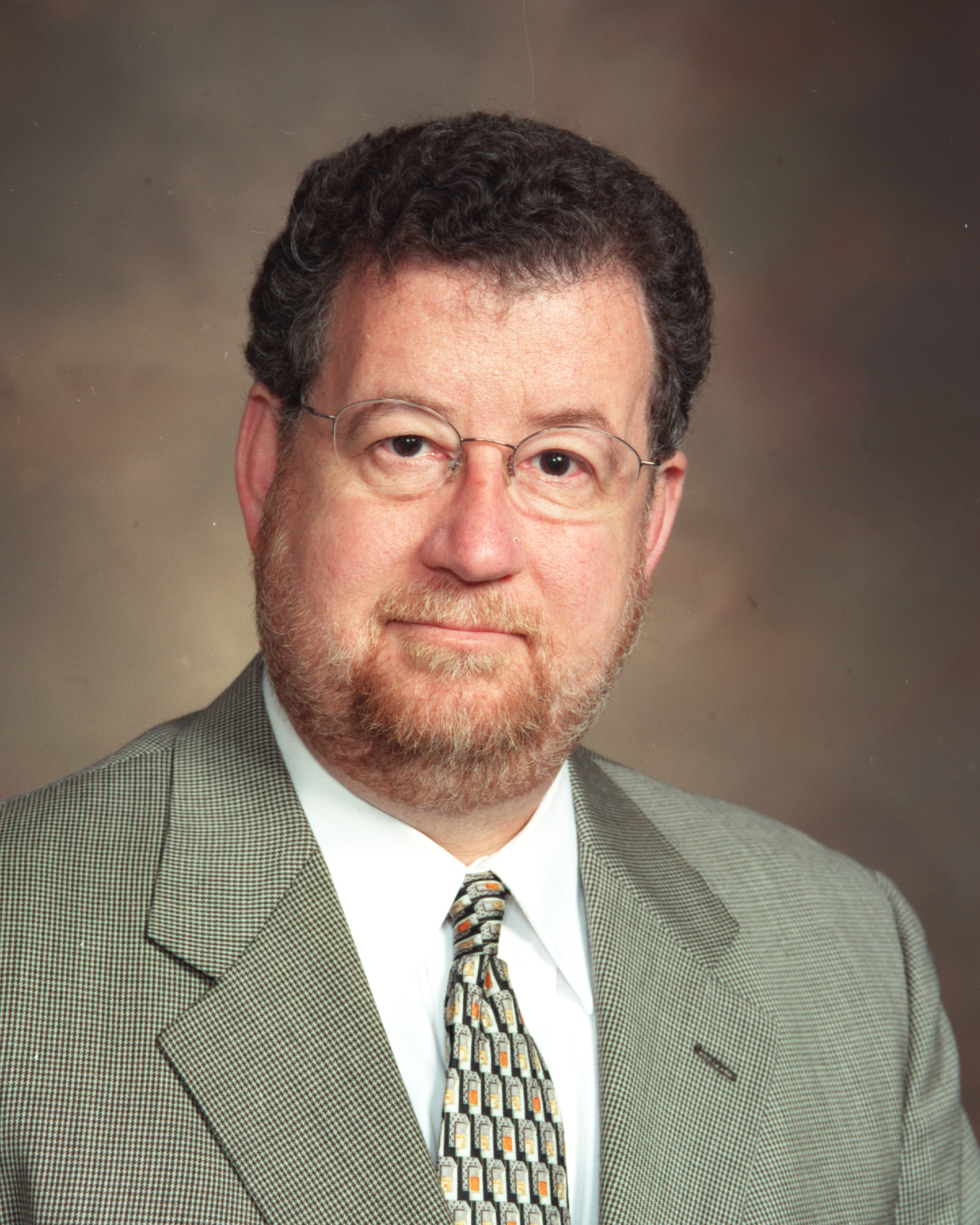

Member of the Iowa House of Representatives
- In office January 11, 1993 – January 12, 2003

Personal details
- Born: February 28, 1952 (age 74) Ottumwa, Iowa, United States
- Party: Democratic
- Spouse: Linda Greenwald
- Children: three
- Education: Indian Hills Community College; Iowa State University
- Occupation: Correctional Counselor

Richard L. Larkin (born February 28, 1952) is an American politician in the state of Iowa.

Larkin was born in Ottumwa, Iowa and worked as a correctional counselor. A Democrat, he served in the Iowa House of Representatives from 1993 to 2003 (99th district).
