= George Pearson (cricketer) =

English cricketer

Personal information
- Full name: George Timothy Pearson
- Born: 21 July 1921; Kensington, London, England
- Died: 24 July 1983 (aged 62); Cuxham, Oxfordshire, England
- Batting: Right-handed

Career statistics
Competition	First-class
Matches	2
Runs scored	54
Batting average	54.00
100s/50s	–/–
Top score	28
Catches/stumpings	3/–
- Source: Cricinfo, 1 March 2019

George Timothy Pearson (21 July 1921 – 24 July 1983) was an English first-class cricketer.

Pearson was born at Kensington and was educated at the Radley College. He later played first-class cricket for the Free Foresters in two matches. The first of these came in 1948 against Oxford University at Oxford, while the second came over a decade later against Cambridge University at Cambridge in 1959. He scored a total of 54 runs in these matches, with a high score of 28.

He died in July 1983 at Cuxham, Oxfordshire.
