= Cuxham with Easington =

Civil parish in South Oxfordshire, England

Coordinates: 51.662°N 1.039°W

- Civil parish
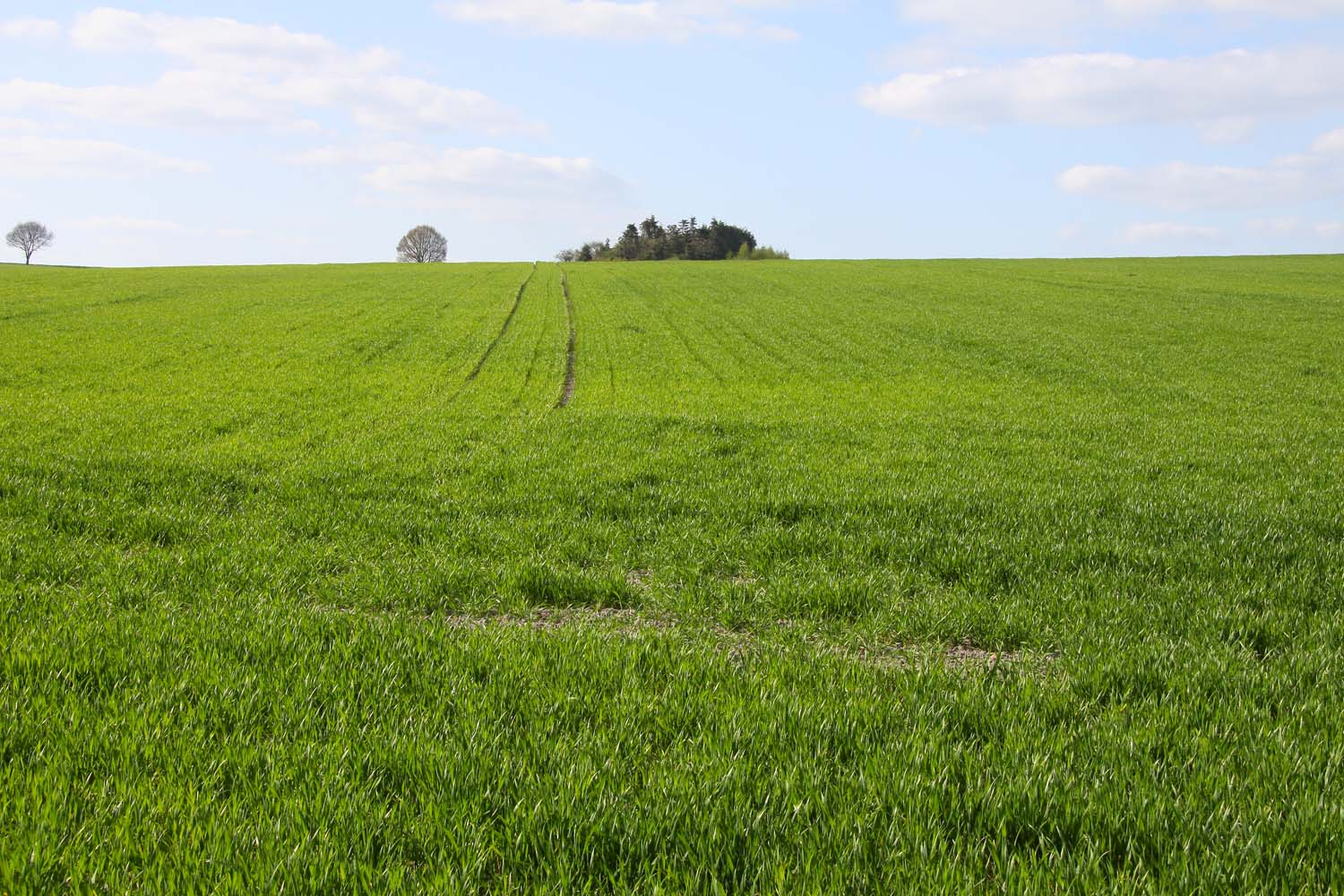
- Field in Cuxham with Easington

- Location within Oxfordshire
- Population: 149 (2011 census)
- Civil parish: Cuxham with Easington
- District: South Oxfordshire
- Shire county: Oxfordshire
- Region: South East
- Country: England
- Sovereign state: United Kingdom
- Post town: Watlington
- Postcode district: OX49
- Dialling code: 01491; 01844
- Police: Thames Valley
- Fire: Oxfordshire
- Ambulance: South Central
- UK Parliament: Henley and Thame

Cuxham with Easington is a civil parish in the South Oxfordshire district, in the county of Oxfordshire, England. It includes the villages of Cuxham and Easington. The 2011 Census recorded a parish population of 149, unchanged from the census ten years' prior, and its area is 3.18 km², the third smallest in the district of those shown in the 2011 census. The parish was formed on 1 April 1932 from "Cuxham" and "Easington".
