= Iowa's 99th House of Representatives district =

American legislative district

House District 99
- Type: District of the Lower house
- Location: Iowa
- Representative: Matthew Rinker
- Parent organization: Iowa General Assembly

The 99th District of the Iowa House of Representatives in the state of Iowa. It is currently composed of part of Lee and Des Moines Counties.

== Current elected officials ==
Matthew Rinker is the representative currently representing the district.

== Past representatives ==
The district has previously been represented by:

- Floyd H. Millen, 1971–1973
- Dennis E. Butler, 1973–1975
- Emil S. Pavich, 1975–1983
- Michael Gronstal, 1983–1985
- Brent Siegrist, 1985–1993
- Clay Spear, 1993–1993
- Richard Larkin, 1993–2003
- Doug Struyk, 2003–2011
- Mary Ann Hanusa, 2011–2013
- Pat Murphy, 2013–2015
- Abby Finkenauer, 2015–2019
- Lindsay James, 2019–2023
- Matthew Rinker, 2023–2027
- Jennifer Kirkman, 2027–present
