= Jennifer Kirkman (politician) =

American politician

Member of the Iowa House of Representatives from the 99th district
- Member-elect
- Assumed office January 1, 2027
- Preceded by: Matthew Rinker

Personal details
- Party: Democratic
- Website: www.kirkmanforiowa.com

Jennifer Kirkman is an American politician. A member of the Democratic Party, she was elected to the Iowa House of Representatives in 2026, representing the 99th district. She was elected in the 2026 election unseating Republican incumbent Matthew Rinker. She is a family law attorney.
