= Jeff Angelo =

American politician

Jeff M. Angelo
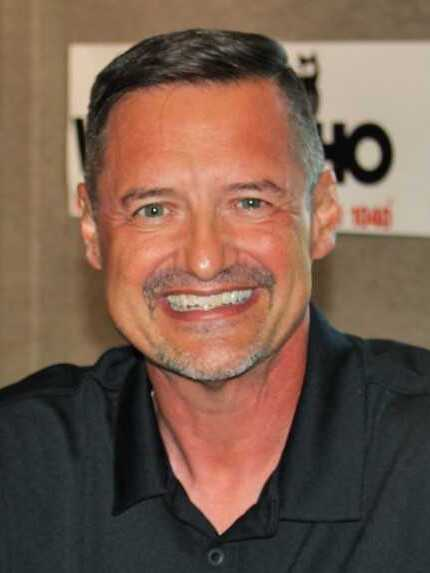
- Angelo in 2018

Member of the Iowa Senate from the 48th district
- In office January 13, 1997 – January 11, 2009
- Preceded by: Leonard Boswell
- Succeeded by: Kim Reynolds

Personal details
- Born: December 5, 1964 (age 61) St. Louis, Missouri
- Party: Republican
- Occupation: Talk Show Host
- Website: https://whoradio.iheart.com/featured/jeff-angelo-on-the-radio/

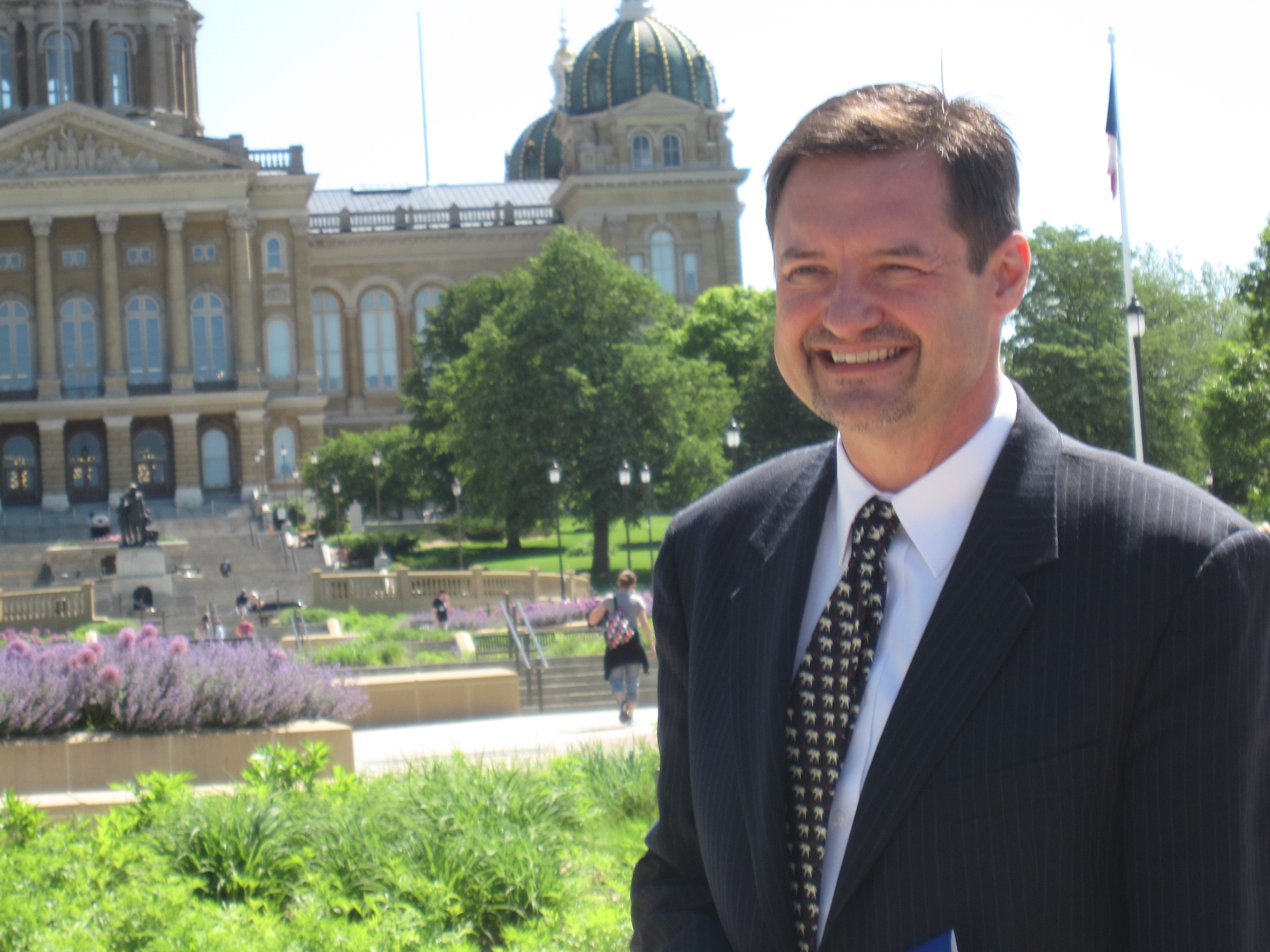
Angelo in 2011

Jeff M. Angelo (born December 5, 1964) is a radio talk show host for WHO (AM) in Des Moines, Iowa. His show, "The WHO Radio Morning Show With Jeff Angelo" airs from 5:30 am (CT) to 9 am (CT) weekdays. He comments on the top stories of the day and invites listener discussion.

Angelo was the Iowa State Senator from the 48th District. He served three terms in the Iowa Senate,(1997–2009) was an assistant minority leader, and served as President Pro Tem.

Angelo served on several committees in the Iowa Senate: the Appropriations committee, the Commerce committee, the Local Government committee, the Rules and Administration committee, and the Ways and Means committee.

Angelo was re-elected in 2004 with 14,981 votes (54%), defeating Democratic opponent Steve Waterman. On September 17, 2007, he announced that he would not seek re-election in 2008.

== Religion ==
Angelo is a Christian.

== Education ==
In 1984, Angelo received his broadcasting degree from Broadcast Center in St. Louis, MO. He graduated from Lutheran High School North in St. Louis in 1983, serving as Senior Class President.

== Organizations ==
- Angelo has served on the board of One Iowa. He has also been a member of the Rotary Club Of Des Moines.
- Chair of the Union County Republicans
- Member of the Union County University Extension Council

Iowa Senate
Preceded by Leonard Boswell	44th District; 1997 – 2003	Succeeded by Thomas Courtney
Preceded by Sandra Greiner	48th District; 2003 – 2009	Succeeded by Kim Reynolds
