= Cuxham =

Village in Oxfordshire, England

Coordinates: 51.652°N 1.038°W

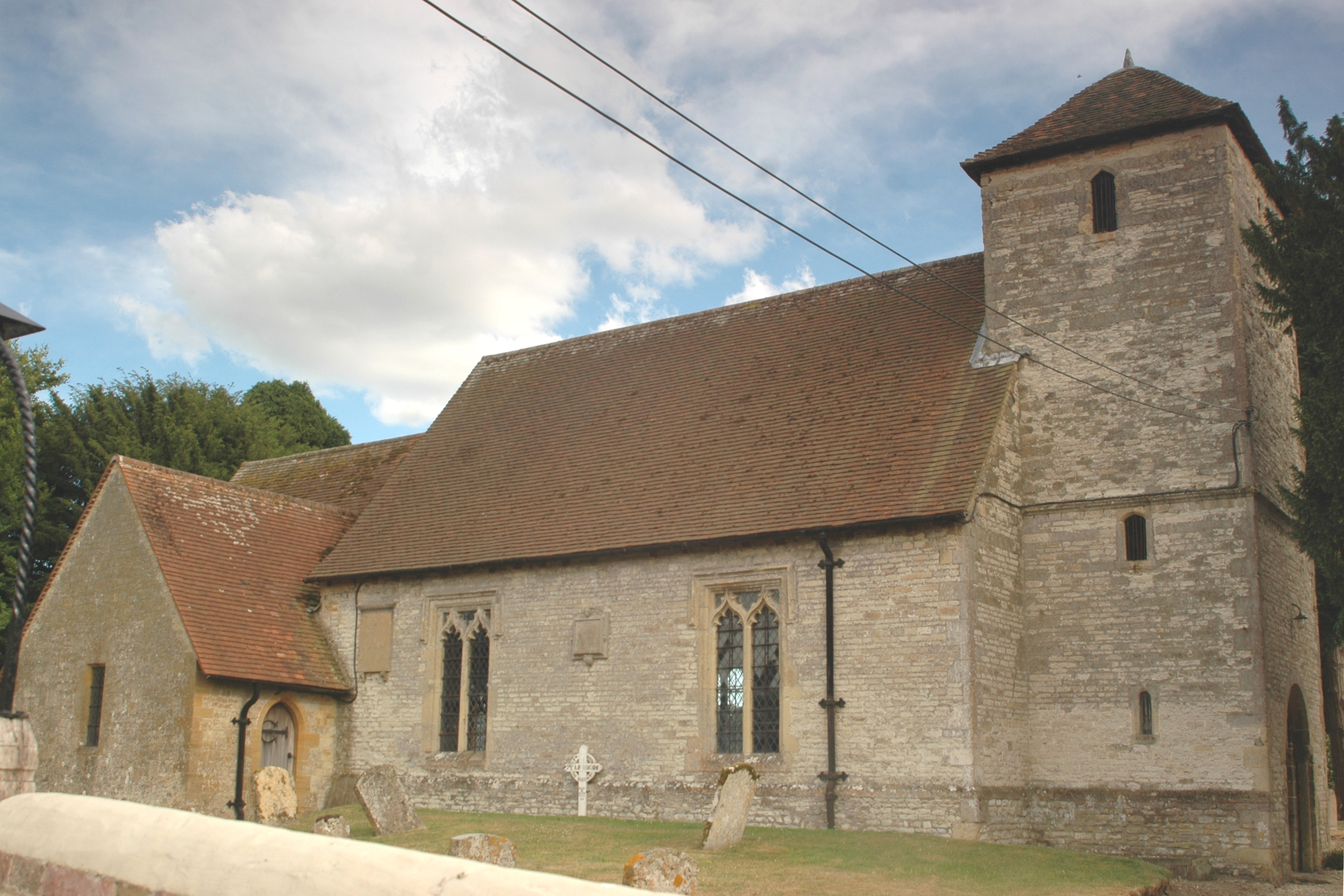
- Holy Rood parish church

- Location within Oxfordshire
- OS grid reference: SU6695
- Civil parish: Cuxham with Easington
- District: South Oxfordshire
- Shire county: Oxfordshire
- Region: South East
- Country: England
- Sovereign state: United Kingdom
- Post town: Watlington
- Postcode district: OX49
- Dialling code: 01491
- Police: Thames Valley
- Fire: Oxfordshire
- Ambulance: South Central
- UK Parliament: Henley

Cuxham is a village in the civil parish of Cuxham with Easington, in the South Oxfordshire district of Oxfordshire, England. It is about 5.5 miles (9 km) north of Wallingford and about 6 miles (10 km) south of Thame.

== History ==
Cuxham was an ancient parish in the Ewelme hundred of Oxfordshire. The parish was merged for ecclesiastical purposes with neighbouring Easington in 1853. They remained separate civil parishes until 1932, when the two parishes were also united into a single civil parish called Cuxham with Easington. At the 1931 census (the last before the abolition of the civil parish), Cuxham had a population of 129.

== Parish church ==
The Church of England parish church of the Holy Rood has a Norman bell tower. The Gothic windows on the north side of the nave were inserted in the 14th century and some of the windows in the tower were added in the 15th century. The windows on the south side of the nave were probably inserted in the 17th century and the church was heavily restored in the 18th century. The Gothic Revival architect C.C. Rolfe rebuilt the chancel in 1895. The Rectory is Georgian and was built about 1800. Since 1983 Holy Rood has been part of a united benefice with Easington, Brightwell Baldwin and Ewelme.

== Mills ==
The Chalgrove Brook flows through Cuxham, and the Domesday Book of 1086 recorded three watermills on it. The present Cuxham Mill was built in about the middle of the 18th century on the site of one of those recorded in the Domesday Book. It was held by the Benedictine Wallingford Priory before Merton College, Oxford acquired the Manor of Cuxham in about 1268–71. In the Middle Ages, Cutt Mill was the manorial corn mill. The present mill on the site was built in the middle of the 18th century.

== Amenities ==
The Half Moon public house was built in the 17th century and extended in the 18th. It is built of chalk rubble with brick quoins.

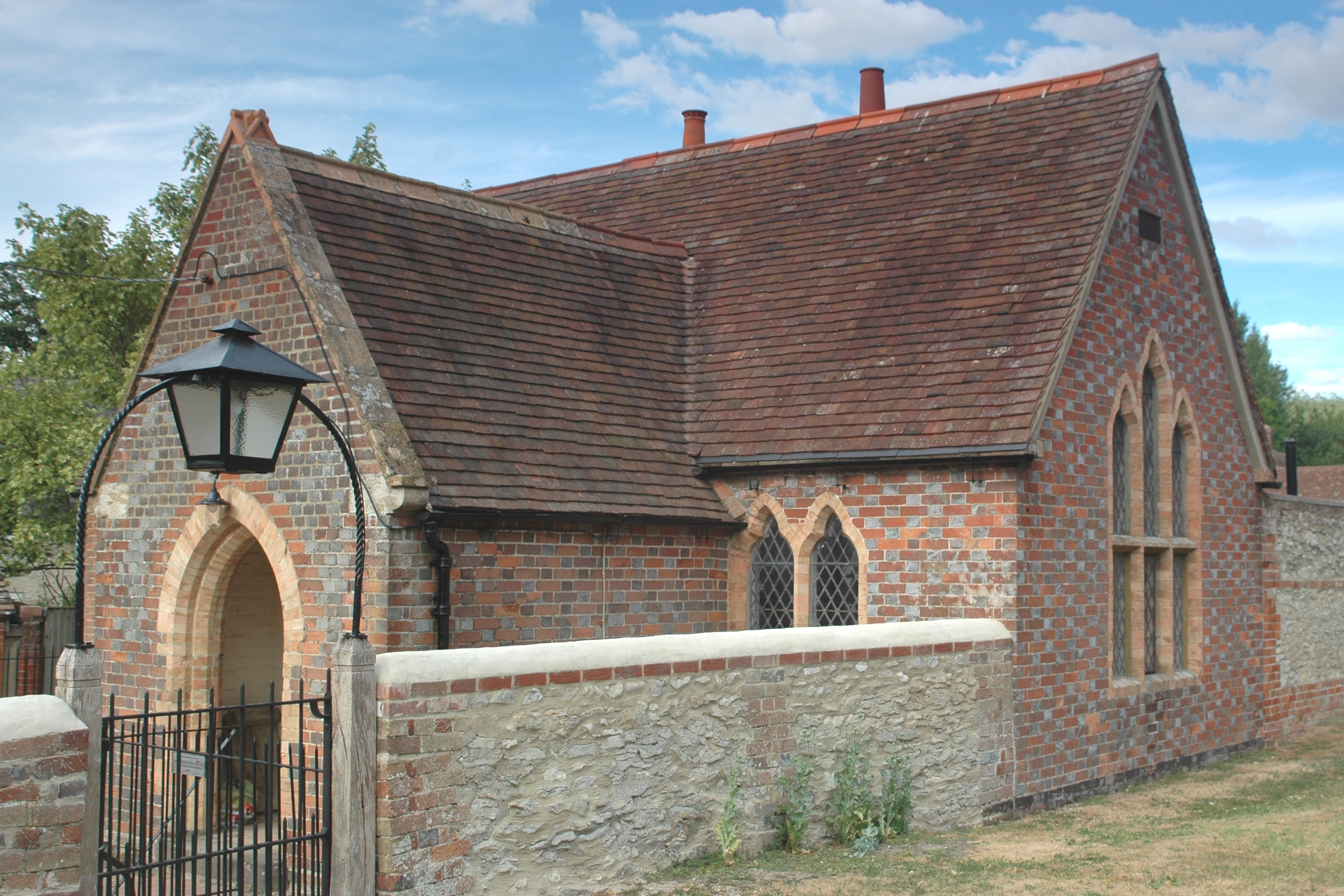
Former parish school

== Sources ==
- Harvey, P.D.A. (1965). An Oxfordshire Village: Cuxham 1240 to 1400. Oxford Historical Series. Oxford: Oxford University Press.
- Sherwood, Jennifer; Pevsner, Nikolaus (1974). Oxfordshire. The Buildings of England. Harmondsworth: Penguin Books. pp. 567–568. ISBN 978-0-14-071045-8.
