= Iowa's 87th House of Representatives district =

American legislative district

House District 87
- Type: District of the Lower house
- Location: Iowa
- Representative: Jeff Shipley
- Parent organization: Iowa General Assembly

The 87th District of the Iowa House of Representatives in the state of Iowa. It is currently composed of Van Buren County, as well as part of Jefferson and Henry Counties.

== Current elected officials ==
Jeff Shipley is the representative currently representing the district.

== Past representatives ==
The district has previously been represented by:

- George Nelson Pierson, 1971–1973
- Floyd H. Millen, 1973–1981
- William R. Sullivan, 1981–1983
- Joyce Lonergan, 1983–1987
- Teresa Garman, 1987–1993
- Bill Royer, 1993–1995
- Effie Boggess, 1995–2003
- Tom Sands, 2003–2013
- Dennis Cohoon, 2013–2021
- Jeff Shipley, 2022–present
