= George Nelson Pierson =

American politician (1904–1989)

George Nelson Pierson (March 28, 1904 – August 26, 1989) was an American farmer and politician.

Pierson was born on March 28, 1904, in Oskaloosa, Iowa, to parents Lews B. and Lillie J. Pierson. After completing his secondary education at Penn Academy in 1922, Pierson graduated from Penn College in 1926 with Bachelor of Arts and Bachelor of Science degrees, then pursued graduate studies at Iowa State University and the Washington University in St. Louis in 1927 and 1930, respectively.

Pierson married Lucile Krizer in 1926, with whom he raised two sons, Royce and Arvid. After she died in 1966, he remarried to Elizabeth Picken. Pierson worked for the YMCA in Ottumwa and St. Louis. In the 1940s, Pierson entered the agriculture industry by producing hybrid seed corn alongside N. H. Krizer. The partnership become known as Pierson Seed Producers and Pierson shared operational duties with his sons, while serving as president of the company until retirement in 1979.

Pierson was first elected to the Iowa House of Representatives as a Republican in 1966, and served two full terms for District 25 until 1971. He then held the District 87 seat between 1971 and 1973.

Pierson died on August 26, 1989.
