= Easington, South Oxfordshire =

Village in Oxfordshire, England

Coordinates: 51.669°N 1.044°W

Easington
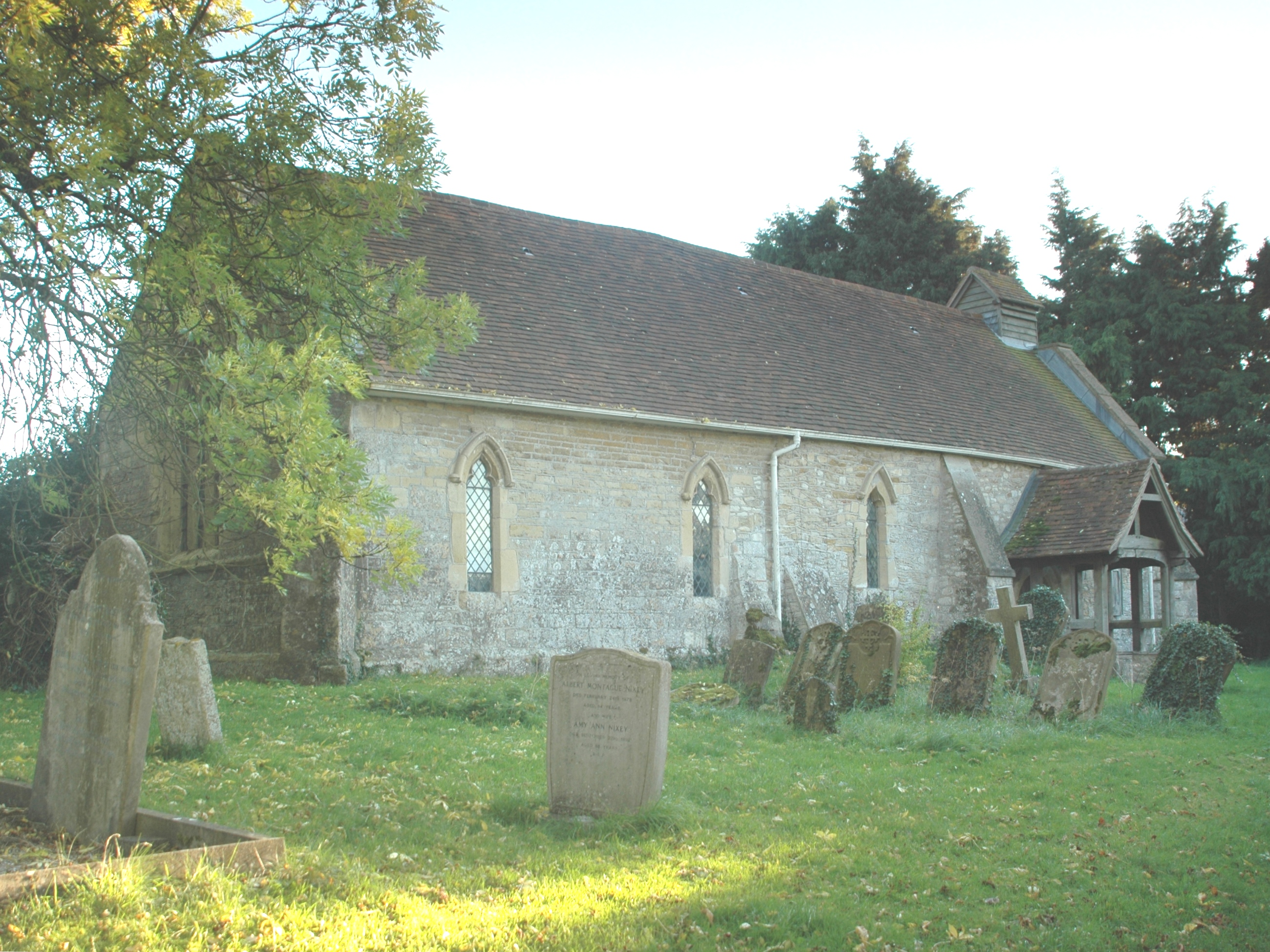
- St Peter's parish church

- Location within Oxfordshire
- OS grid reference: SU6697
- Civil parish: Cuxham with Easington
- District: South Oxfordshire
- Shire county: Oxfordshire
- Region: South East
- Country: England
- Sovereign state: United Kingdom
- Post town: Watlington
- Postcode district: OX49
- Dialling code: 01844
- Police: Thames Valley
- Fire: Oxfordshire
- Ambulance: South Central
- UK Parliament: Henley

Easington is a small village in the civil parish of Cuxham with Easington, in the South Oxfordshire districtof Oxfordshire, England. It is about 5.5 miles (9 km) north of Wallingford and about 6 miles (10 km) south of Thame.

== History ==
Easington was an ancient parish in the Ewelme hundred of Oxfordshire. The parish was merged for ecclesiastical purposes with neighbouring Cuxham in 1853. They remained separate civil parishes until 1932, when the two parishes were also united into a single civil parish called Cuxham with Easington. At the 1931 census (the last before the abolition of the civil parish), Easington had a population of 20.

== Parish church ==
The Church of England parish church of Saint Peter was built in the 14th century. It consists of a continuous nave and chancel with no chancel arch between them. The chancel masonry is ashlar, noticeably better-dressed and more evenly coursed than that of the nave. The church building includes a 12th-century Norman doorway re-used from an earlier church on the same site. The font is tub-shaped, suggesting that it too is Norman. The chancel windows are Perpendicular Gothic. The east window has ogee tracery and includes 14th century stained glass. The piscina also is ogeed. Beside the east window on the east wall are the remains of a medieval wall painting. The woodwork of the pulpit and reading desk are Jacobean items carved in the 17th century. The pulpit bears the date 1633 but Sherwood and Pevsner suggest that it was assembled in the 19th century from Jacobean materials. St. Peter's is a Grade II* listed building.

== Gallery ==
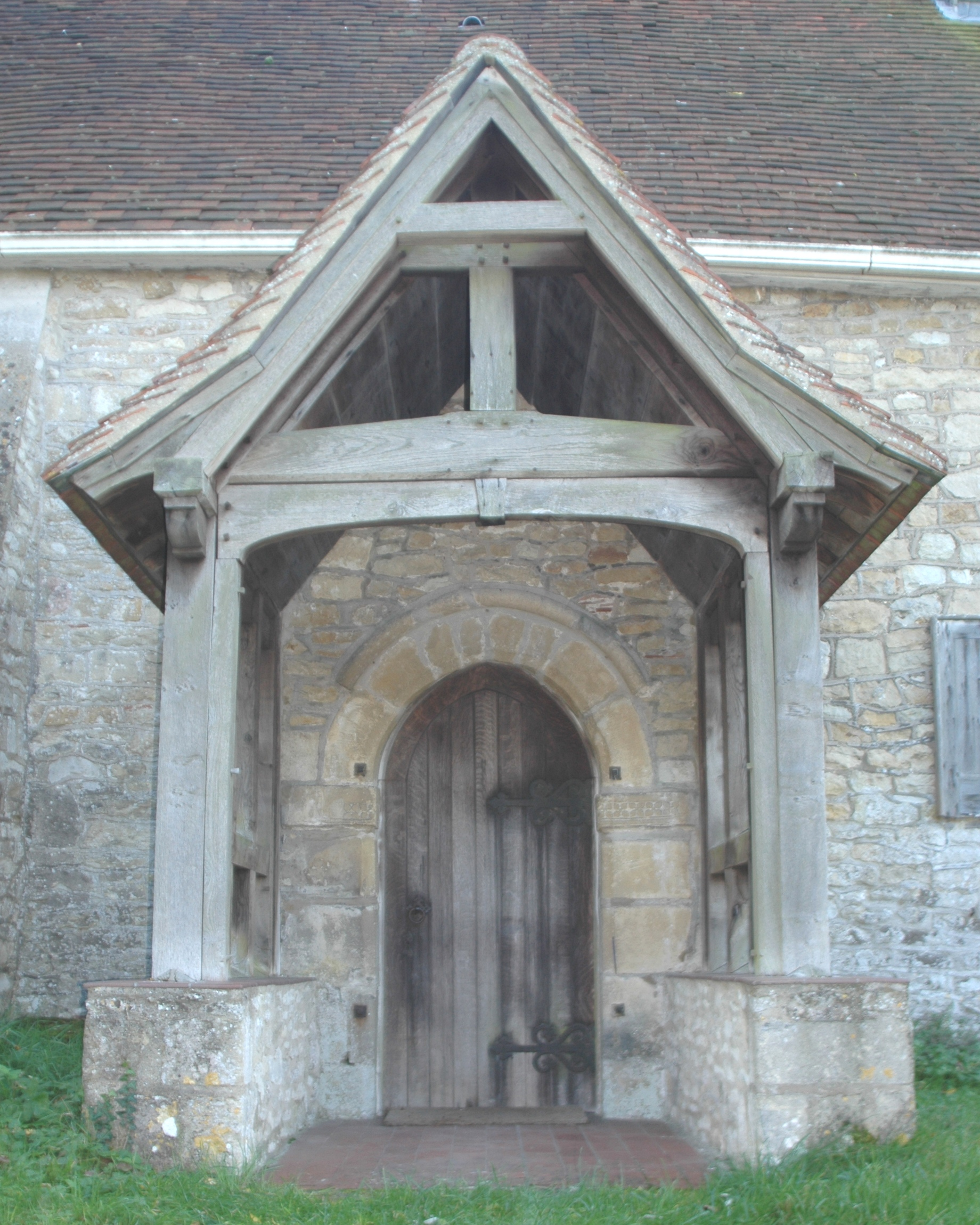
St. Peter's parish church: porch with Norman doorway

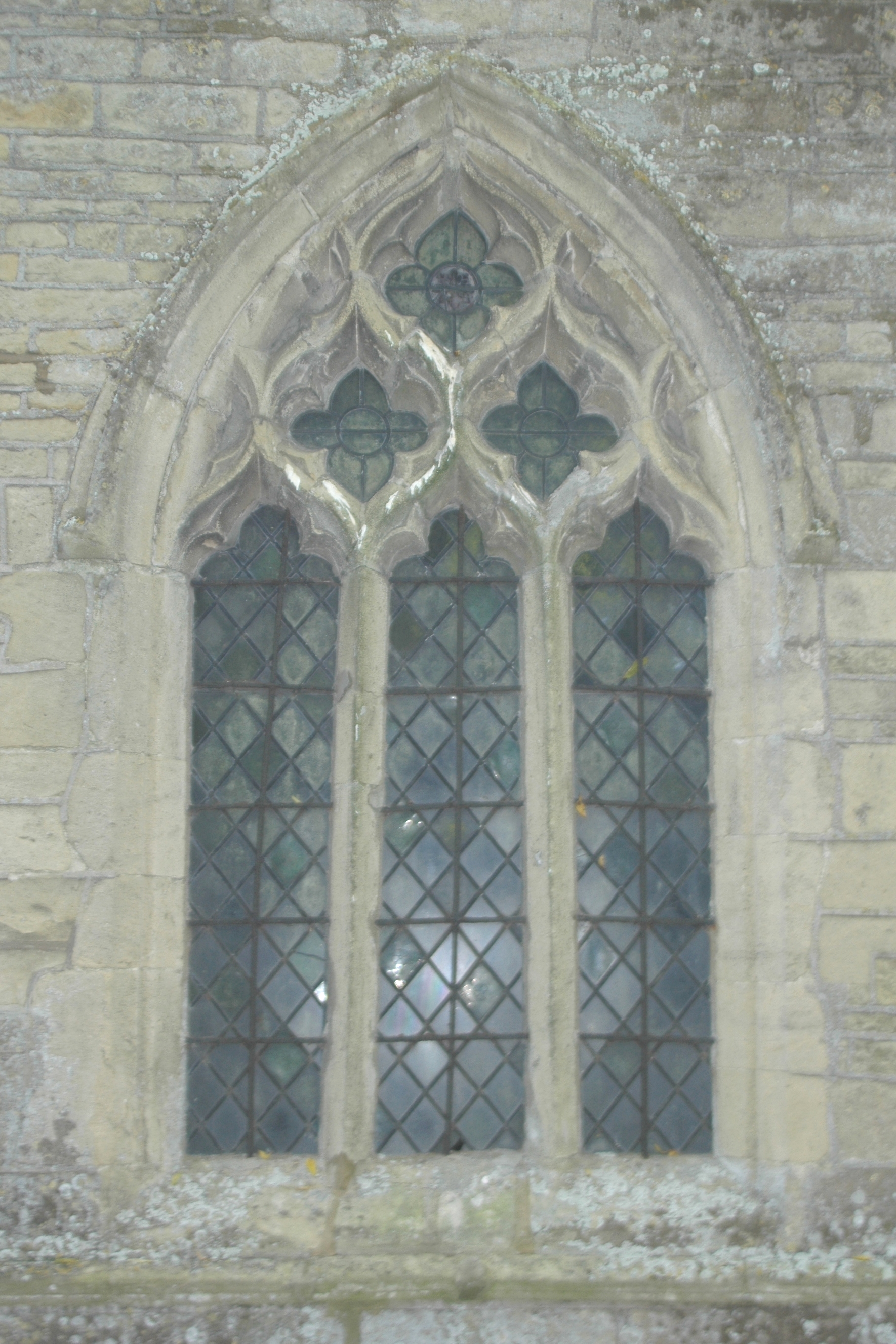
St. Peter's parish church: east window of chancel

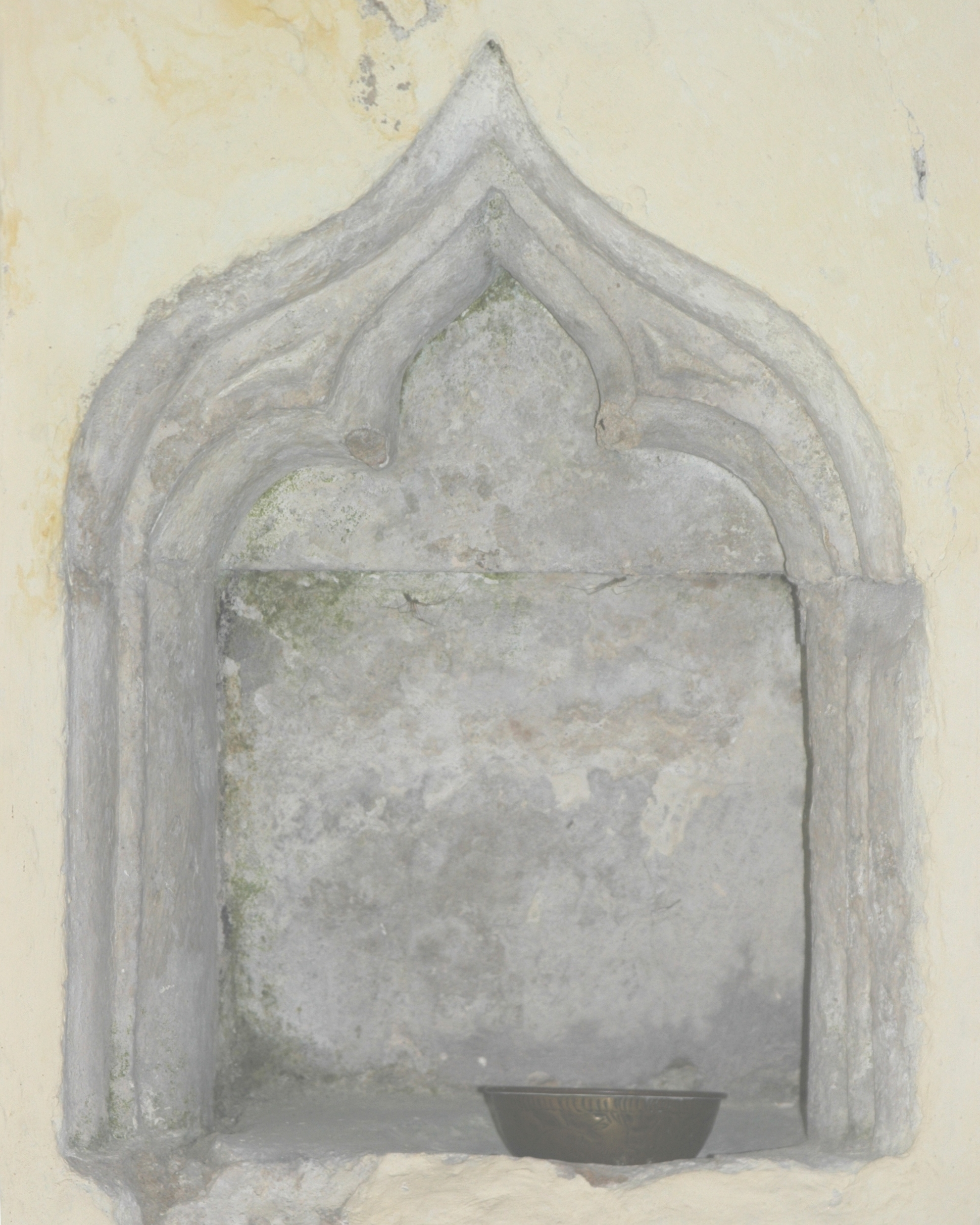
St. Peter's parish church: piscina

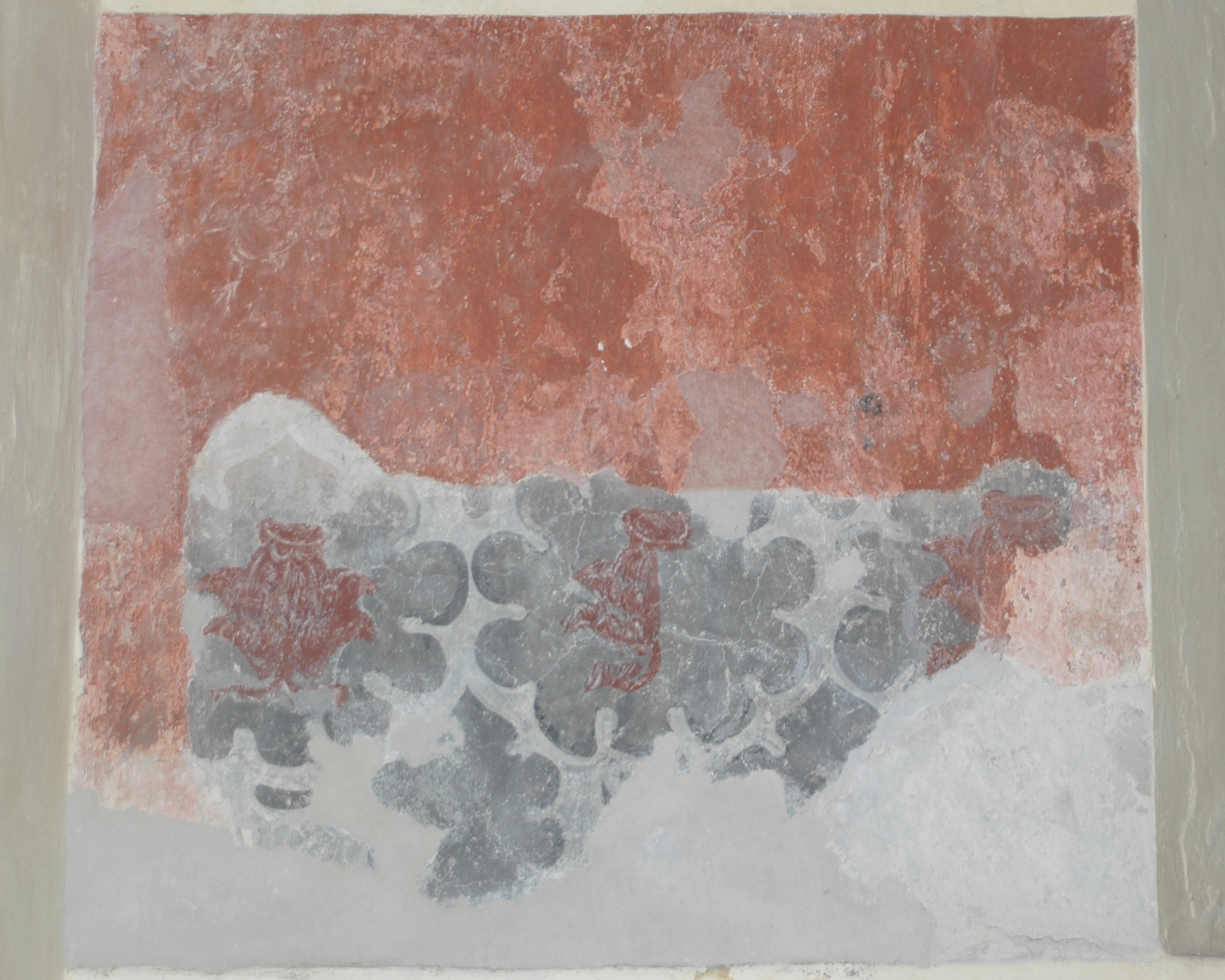
St. Peter's parish church: remains of wall painting in chancel

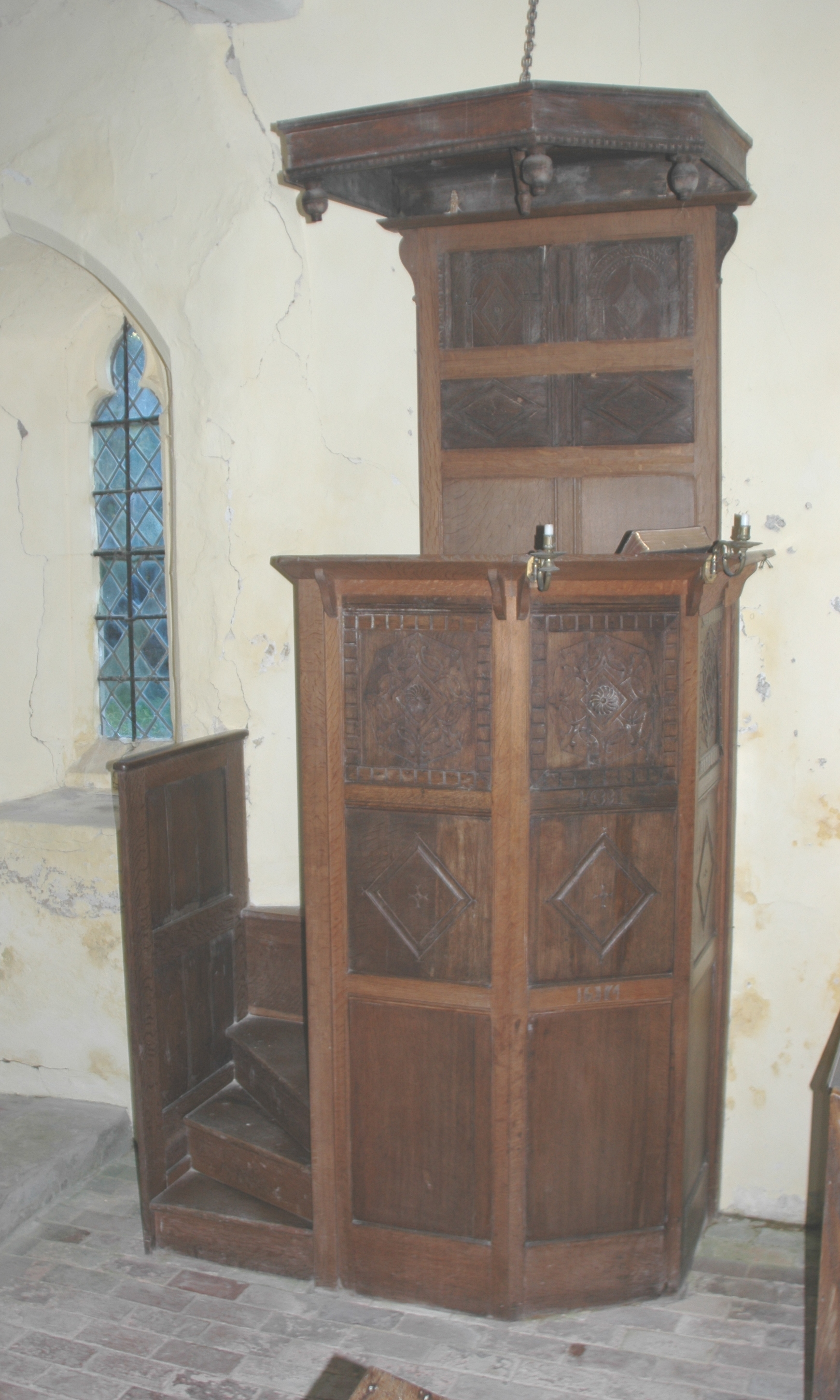
St. Peter's parish church: Jacobean pulpit

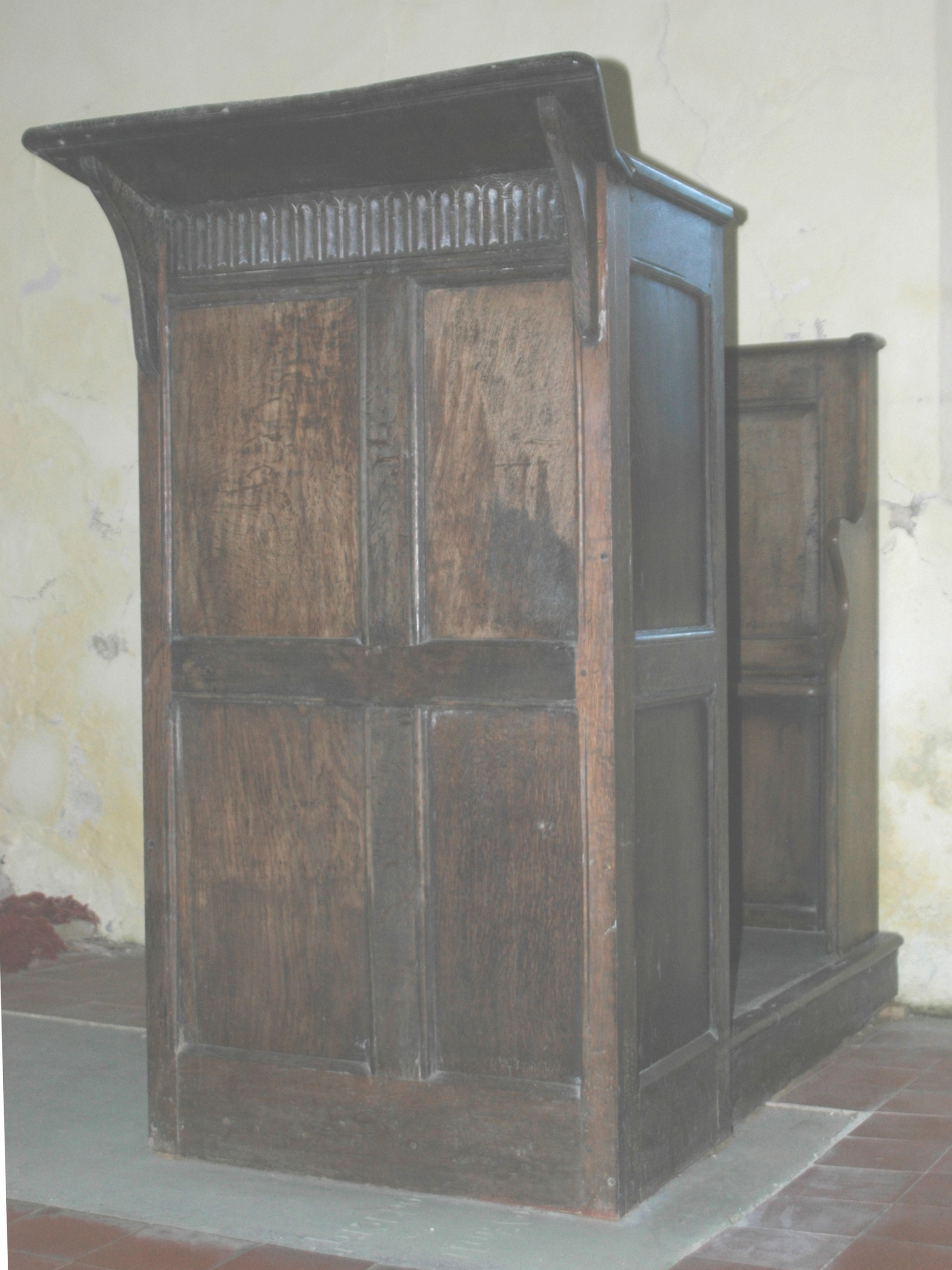
St. Peter's parish church: Jacobean reading desk

== Sources ==
- Sherwood, Jennifer; Pevsner, Nikolaus (1974). Oxfordshire. The Buildings of England. Harmondsworth: Penguin Books. p. 591. ISBN 0-14-071045-0.
