= Floyd Millen =

American politician (1919–1998)

Floyd H. Millen (17 May 1919 – 18 May 1998) was an American politician.

Millen was born on 17 May 1919 in Watertown, South Dakota. He raised three sons with his wife Betty Coffin, whom he married in 1942. They lived in Farmington, Iowa, and from 1970, in West Des Moines. Millen's political experience before election as a state representative included thirteen years with the Farmington Independent School District as president and director. He was elected to the Iowa House of Representatives nine times consecutively, serving as a member for District 2 from 1963 to 1971, a single two-year term for District 99, followed by a four-term tenure as the representative of District 87. At the start of his third term, Millen, a Republican, was elected majority leader. He subsequently served as speaker pro tempore during his fourth and fifth terms, followed by two terms as minority leader and his final term in office as speaker. Millen died on 18 May 1998 at Iowa Methodist Medical Center in Des Moines, where he was seeking treatment for cancer.
