= Thomas G. Courtney =

American politician

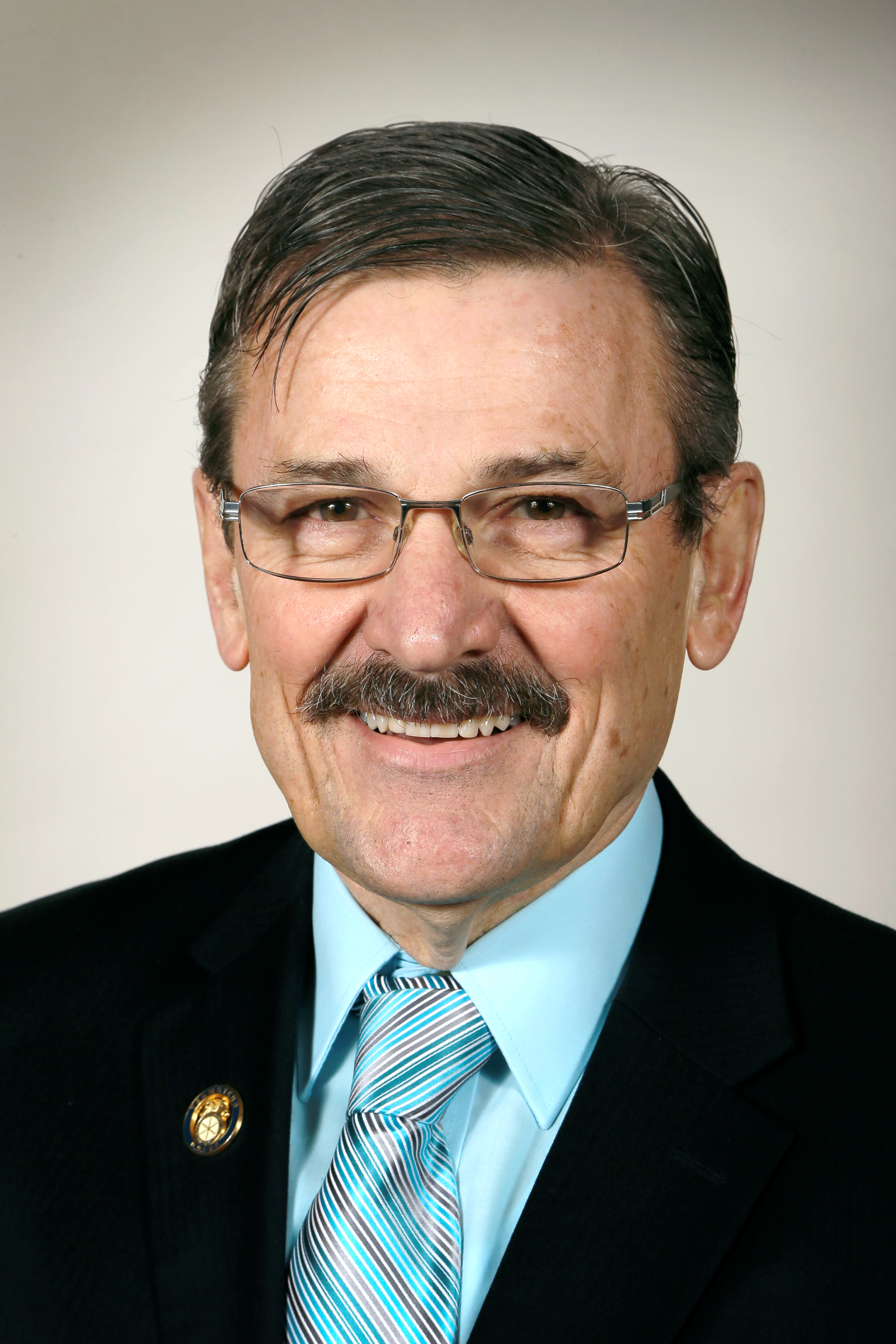

Member of the Iowa Senate from the 44th district

Senate Majority Whip
- In office January 13, 2003 – January 9, 2017
- Preceded by: Jeff Angelo
- Succeeded by: Thomas Greene

Personal details
- Born: September 24, 1947 (age 78) Burlington, Iowa
- Party: Iowa Democratic Party
- Spouse: Donna Courtney (1966-2008, her death) Nancy Courtney (present)
- Children: one son, two daughters
- Occupation: Retired
- Profession: State Senator, Union representative, air traffic controller
- Website: Courtney's website

Military service
- Branch/service: United States Air Force

Thomas G. Courtney (born 24 September 1947) was the Iowa State Senator from the 44th District of Iowa and served as the majority whip.

== Biography ==
Courtney was born on September 24, 1947, in Burlington, Iowa and grew up in Wapello, Iowa. He graduated from Wapello High School.

After graduating, Courtney served six years in the U.S. Air Force as an air traffic controller. He worked for the Case/New Holland Co. in Burlington, and served six years as bargaining chair for UAW Local 807 and was the union production safety representative from 1988 until retirement in 2002.

Courtney served as Southeast Iowa Community Action Program chair, as well as eight years on the Burlington School Board, with six years as its president. He is the former chairman of the Burlington Civil Service Commission. Courtney served on the Iowa Judicial Nominating Commission, and he currently serves on the Regional Workforce Development Board for Region 16, and is a member of AMVETS. He served on steering committee for Community Health Center of Southeast Iowa and Heartland Center for Occupational Health and Safety Board. Courtney is a past chair of the Des Moines County Democrats.

== Personal life ==
Courtney is married to his wife Nancy. He has one son, two daughters, and four grandchildren.

Courtney married his first wife, Donna, in 1966. She died August 24, 2008.

Courtney's family has a history of heart problems. He has had heart bypass surgery 3 times, most recently in 2013.

== Iowa State Senate ==
Courtney represented district 44 in southeastern Iowa and served as the majority whip of the Iowa State Senate. He is a member of the Iowa Democratic Party.

Courtney serves on several committees in the Iowa Senate - the Agriculture committee; the Commerce committee; the Rules and Administration committee; the Labor and Business Relations committee, where he is vice chair; and the Government Oversight committee, where he is chair.

Courtney was first elected in 2002. He was re-elected in 2008, & 2012.

Courtney was defeated in his reelection bid in 2016.

== Electoral history ==
2008: Defeated David Kerr 60%-40%

2012: Defeated Brad Bourn 57%-43%

2016: Defeated by Thomas Greene 53%-47%

Iowa Senate
Preceded by Jeff Angelo	44th District; 2003 – present	Succeeded by Thomas Greene
