= Emil Pavich =

American politician

Member of the Iowa House of Representatives from the 100th district
- In office January 10, 1983 – January 10, 1993
- Preceded by: Marcia Walter
- Succeeded by: Dennis Cohoon

Member of the Iowa House of Representatives from the 99th district
- In office January 13, 1975 – January 10, 1983
- Preceded by: Dennis E. Butler
- Succeeded by: Michael Gronstal

Personal details
- Born: July 30, 1931 Council Bluffs, Iowa, U.S.
- Died: May 6, 2005 (aged 73) Council Bluffs, Iowa, U.S.
- Party: Democratic

Emil Pavich (July 30, 1931 – May 6, 2005) was an American politician.

Emil Pavich was born in Council Bluffs, Iowa, to parents Guy and Josephine. He graduated from Thomas Jefferson High School in 1949. After serving during the Korean War with the United States Army, he worked for Kellogg's in Omaha, Nebraska, until 1991. He was elected to two terms on the Council Bluffs City Council, then served in the Iowa House of Representatives from 1975 to 1993.

He died on May 6, 2005, in Council Bluffs, Iowa, at age 73.
