= Iowa's 44th House of Representatives district =

American legislative district

House District 44
- Type: District of the Lower house
- Location: Iowa
- Representative: Larry McBurney
- Parent organization: Iowa General Assembly

The 44th District of the Iowa House of Representatives in the state of Iowa is part of Polk County.

== Representatives ==
The district has been represented by:

- James D. Wells, 1971–1973
- Conrad R. Fisher, 1973–1975
- Joyce Lonergan, 1975–1983
- Andy McKean, 1983–1993
- Robert C. Arnould, 1993–1995
- Neil P. Harrison, 1995–1997
- Ronald J. Kinzer, 1997–1999
- John Sunderbruch, 1999–2001
- Cindy Winckler, 2001–2003
- Polly Granzow, 2003–2009
- Annette Sweeney, 2009–2013
- Rob Taylor, 2013–2019
- Kenan Judge, 2019–2023
- John Forbes, 2023–2025
- Larry McBurney, 2025–
