= Pam Jochum =

American politician (born 1954)

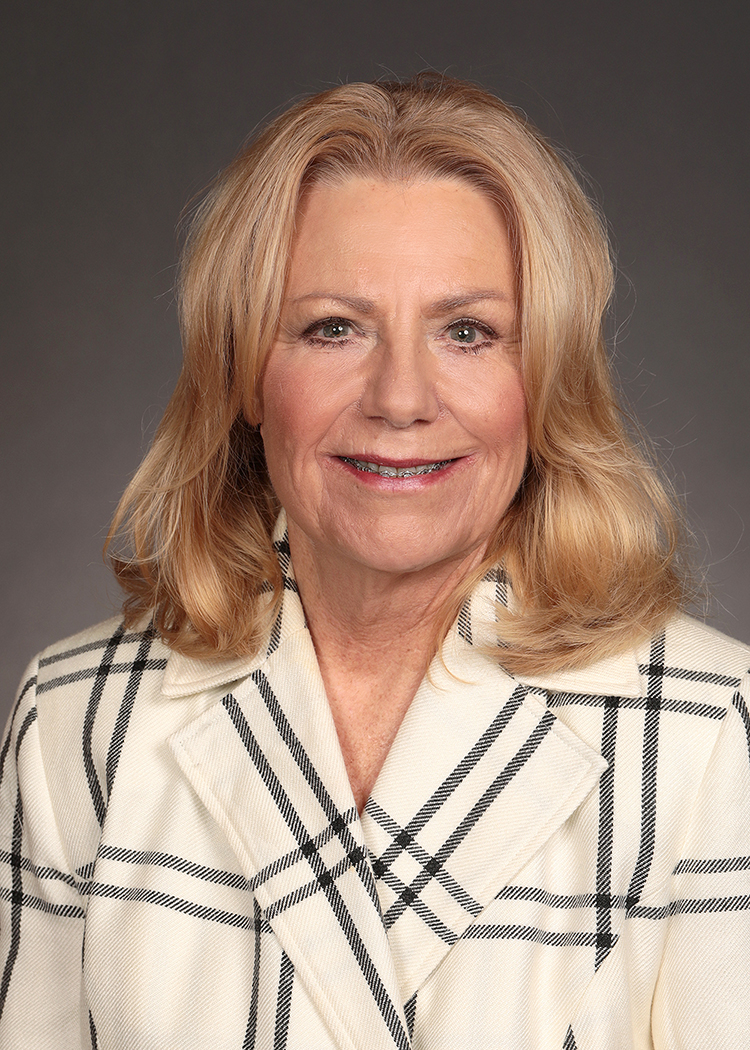
- Official portrait, 2021

President of the Iowa Senate
- In office January 14, 2013 – January 9, 2017
- Preceded by: Jack Kibbie
- Succeeded by: Jack Whitver

Minority Leader of the Iowa Senate
- In office June 7, 2023 – January 8, 2025
- Preceded by: Zach Wahls
- Succeeded by: Janice Weiner

Member of the Iowa Senate
- In office January 12, 2009 – January 12, 2025
- Preceded by: Mike Connolly
- Succeeded by: Thomas Townsend
- Constituency: 14th district (2009–2013); 50th district (2013–2023); 36th district (2023–2025)

Member of the Iowa House of Representatives
- In office January 11, 1993 – January 12, 2009
- Preceded by: Andra Atteberry
- Succeeded by: Charles Isenhart
- Constituency: 35th district (1993–2003); 27th district (2003–2009)

Personal details
- Born: Mary Pamela Hingtgen; September 26, 1954 (age 71) Dubuque, Iowa, U.S.
- Party: Democratic
- Spouse: Thomas J. Jochum (div. 1985)
- Education: Loras College (BA)

Mary Pamela Jochum (née Hingtgen; born September 26, 1954) is an American politician who previously served as the Iowa State Senator from the 36th District until 2025 and former President of the Iowa Senate. A Democrat, she was a member of the Iowa House of Representatives from 1993 to 2009, when she became a member of the Iowa Senate.

Jochum served on several committees in the Iowa Senate - the Appropriations committee; the Judiciary committee; the Rebuild Iowa committee; the State Government committee; the Ways and Means committee; and she was the vice chair of the Labor and Business Relations committee; Rules & Administration and state committees. She also served as vice chair of the Administration and Regulation Appropriations Subcommittee. Her prior political experience includes serving as floor whip at the Democratic National Convention in 1984, serving as chair of the Dubuque County Democratic Central Committee in 1982.

Jochum was elected to the Senate in 2008 with 19,443 votes, defeating Republican opponent John Hulsizer, Jr.

== Education ==
Jochum graduated from Wahlert High School and she received her A.A. and B.A. degrees from Loras College.

== Career ==
Prior to working in politics, Jochum worked at Loras College.

== Organizations ==
- League of Women Voters
- Greater Dubuque Development Corporation
- Prevention of Disabilities
- Task Force to Prevent Family Violence

Political offices
Preceded by Jack Kibbie	President of the Iowa Senate; 2013–2017	Succeeded by Jack Whitver
Iowa Senate
Preceded by Zach Wahls	Minority Leader of the Iowa Senate; 2023–2025	Succeeded by Janice Weiner
