= Iowa's 27th House of Representatives district =

American legislative district

House District 27
- Type: District of the Lower house
- Location: Iowa
- Representative: Kenan Judge
- Parent organization: Iowa General Assembly

The 27th District of the Iowa House of Representatives in the state of Iowa. It is currently composed of part of Dallas County.

== Current elected officials ==
Kenan Judge is the representative currently representing the district.

== Past representatives ==
The district has previously been represented by:

- William S. Beardsley, 1947–1949
- Jewell O. Waugh, 1971–1973
- James D. Wells, 1973–1981
- Richard Running, 1981–1983
- Paul G. Copenhaver, 1983–1985
- Joseph M. Kremer, 1985–1993
- Darrell R. Hanson, 1993–1995
- Joseph M. Kremer, 1995–1999
- Michael D. Jager, 1999–2001
- Andra Atteberry, 2001–2003
- Pam Jochum, 2003–2009
- Charles Isenhart, 2009–2013
- Joel Fry, 2013–2023
- Kenan Judge, 2023-present
