= Kenan Judge =

American politician

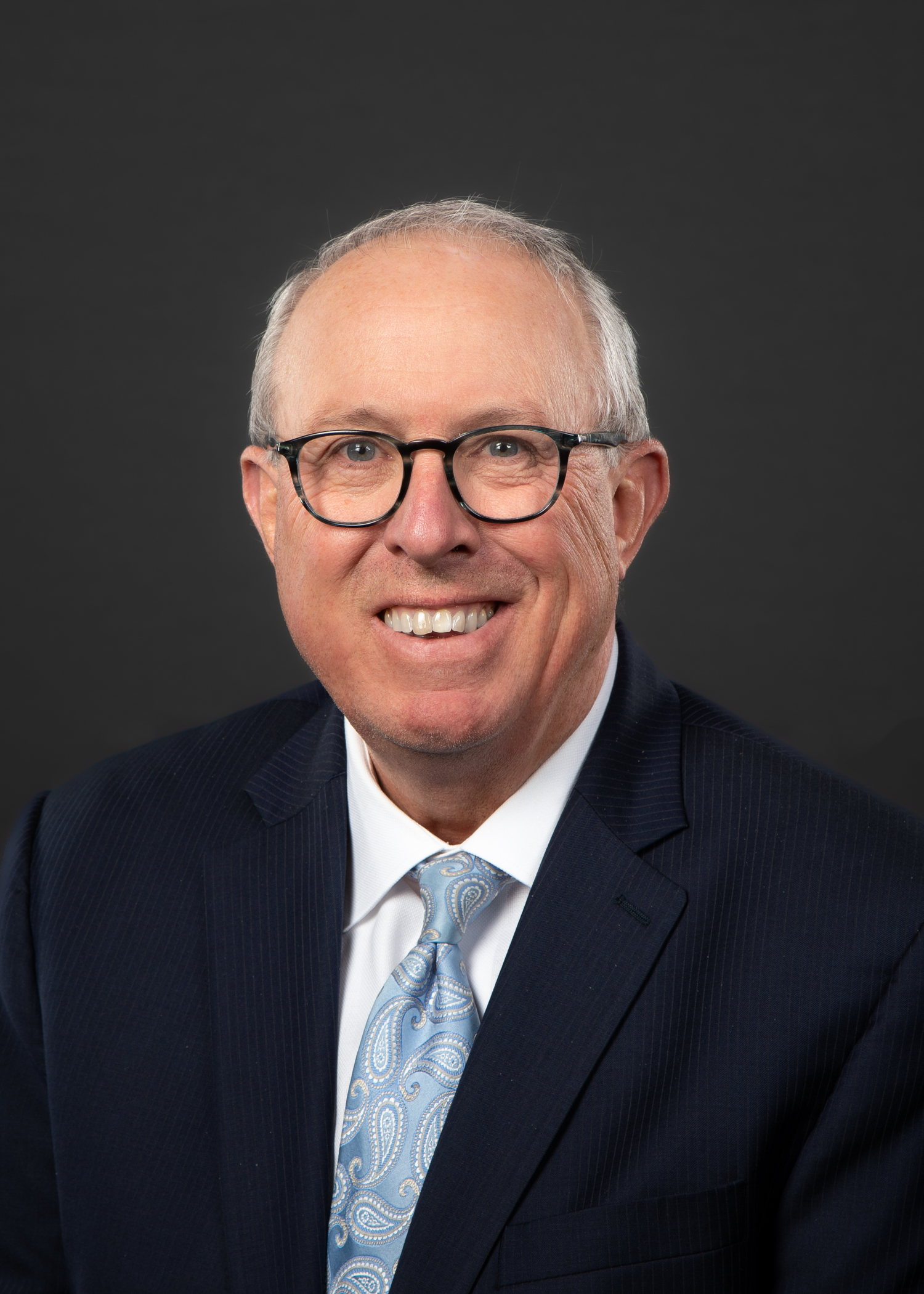

Member of the Iowa House of Representatives from the 27th district
- Incumbent
- Assumed office January 14, 2019
- Preceded by: Rob Taylor

Personal details
- Born: Ottumwa, Iowa, U.S.
- Party: Republican (until 2016); Democratic

Kenan Judge (born c. 1957) is an American politician. A member of the Democratic Party, he has served as a member of the Iowa House of Representatives from District 27 since 2019.

== Career ==
Judge was born in Ottumwa, Iowa, and raised in Georgetown, an unincorporated area of Monroe County, Iowa. After graduating from Albia High School, Judge began working for grocery chain Hy-Vee, where he worked for 38 years, eventually becoming an executive. He was a lifelong Republican but left the party after Trump won the 2016 Republican Party presidential primaries. He began campaigning for the District 44 seat of the Iowa House of Representatives in January 2018 as a moderate Democrat. He defeated Republican Party candidate Anna Bergman and Libertarian Party candidate Gabriel Thomson in the November 2018 general election. Judge won reelection in 2020, facing Republican Dave Lorenzen and independent David Stock.

=== Committee assignments ===
As of January 2026, Judge serves on the following committees in the Iowa House.

- Commerce (ranking member)
- Agriculture
- Natural Resources
- Ways and Means
- Health and Human Services Appropriations Subcommittee

Iowa House of Representatives
Preceded by Joel Fry	24th District; 2023 – present	Succeeded by Incumbent
Preceded by Rob Taylor	44th District; 2019 – 2023	Succeeded by John Forbes
