= Michael Jäger =

Michael Jäger may refer to:

- Michael Jäger (artist) (born 1956), German artist
- Michael Jäger (astronomer) (born 1958), Austrian amateur astronomer
- Michael D. Jager (born 1968), American politician from Iowa

== See also ==
- Michael Jagger (disambiguation)
