= Ronald Kinzer =

American politician

Ronald J. Kinzer

Member of the Iowa House of Representatives from the 44th district
- In office 13 January 1997 – 10 January 1999
- Preceded by: Neil P. Harrison
- Succeeded by: John Sunderbruch

Personal details
- Born: 23 May 1933 Roanoke, Virginia, U.S.
- Died: 19 June 2002 (aged 69) Davenport, Iowa
- Party: Democratic

Ronald J. Kinzer (23 May 1933–19 June 2002) was an American politician who served in the Iowa House of Representatives from 1997 to 1999 as a Democrat from District 44.

== Life ==
Ronald Kinzer was born in Roanoke, Virginia, on 23 May 1933 to Henry B. and Louise Ratcliff Kinzer. He graduated from Dublin High School in 1952. From 1953 to 1957, he served in the United States Navy with the SeaBees. Kinzer was a volunteer firefighter in the Dublin, Virginia fire department. Kinzer worked for three decades in the iron industry, retiring in 1991 with journeyman status. He was affiliated with Iron Workers Local #111, headquartered in Rock Island, Illinois, serving as its president from 1981 to 1983, and its apprenticeship coordinator from 1988 to his retirement from the industry.

Kinzer succeeded Neil P. Harrison in the Iowa House of Representatives, serving a single two-year term as the legislator from District 44. He was 32nd degree Mason, as well as a past master and senior warden of Roosevelt Lodge 626 in Davenport. Kinzer was a facilitator for drug and alcohol abuse at Genesis Medical Center-West Campus in Davenport, Iowa. He died on 19 June 2002 at that same medical facility, and was buried at National Cemetery, Rock Island Arsenal.
