= John Sunderbruch =

American politician

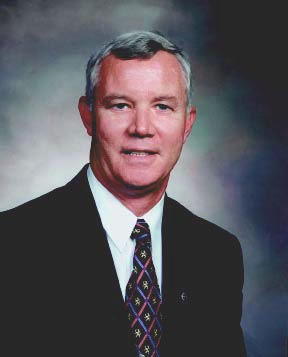

Member of the Iowa House of Representatives from the 44th district
- In office January 11, 1999 – January 7, 2001
- Preceded by: Ronald J. Kinzer
- Succeeded by: Cindy Winckler

Personal details
- Born: November 9, 1949 Davenport, Iowa, U.S.
- Died: August 4, 2017 (aged 67) Davenport, Iowa, U.S.
- Party: Republican
- Spouse: Maria Robles
- Children: 3

John P. Sunderbruch (November 9, 1949 – August 4, 2017) was an American politician in the state of Iowa.

Sunderbruch was born in Davenport, Iowa. A Republican, he served in the Iowa House of Representatives from 1999 to 2001 (44th district).

He died of cancer on August 4, 2017, in Davenport, Iowa.
