= Cindy Winckler =

American politician (born 1950)

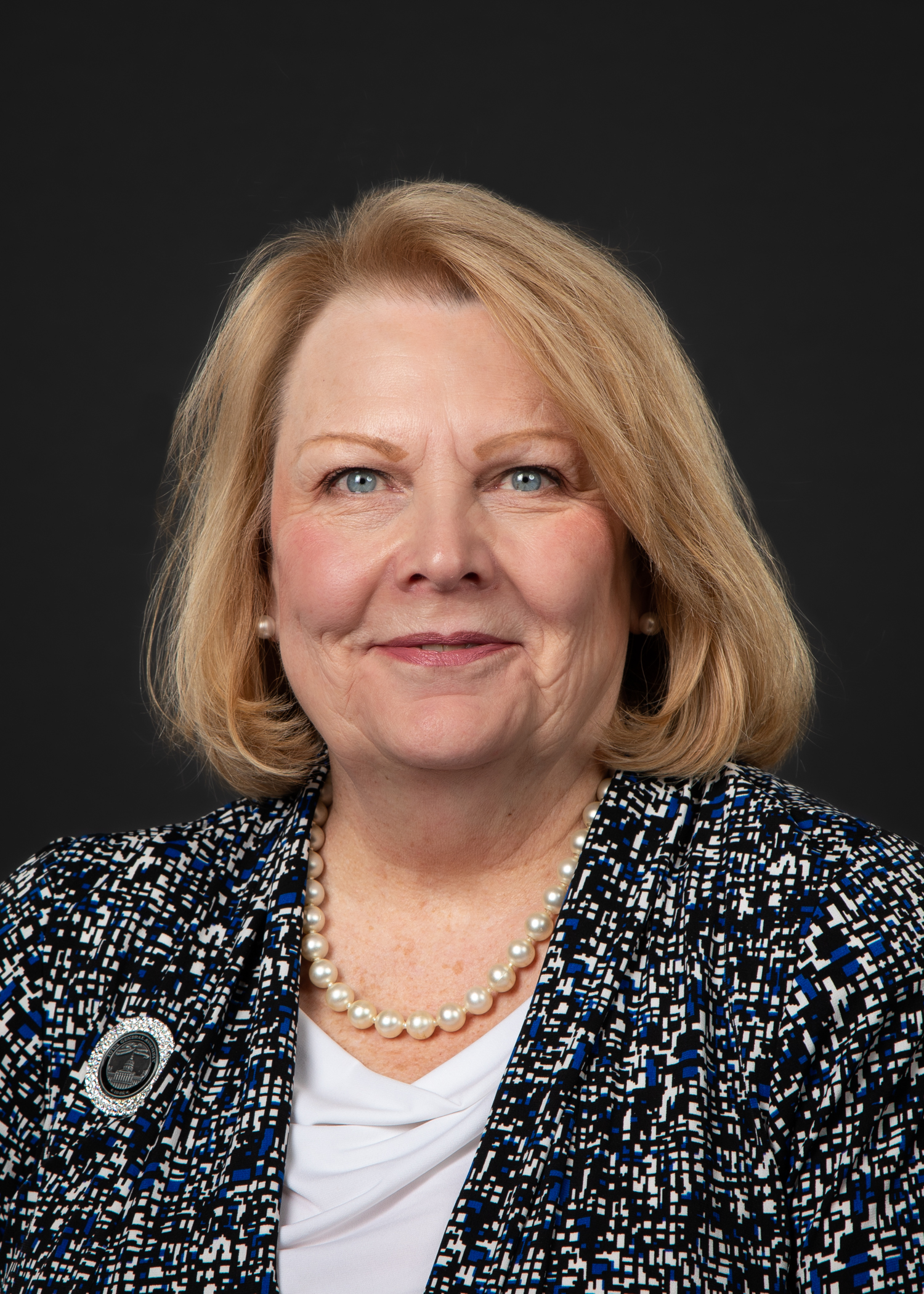

Member of the Iowa Senate from the 49th district
- Incumbent
- Assumed office January 9, 2023
- Preceded by: Chris Cournoyer

Member of the Iowa House of Representatives from the 90th district
- In office January 8, 2001 – January 8, 2023
- Preceded by: John Sunderbruch
- Succeeded by: Adam Zabner

Personal details
- Born: May 27, 1950 (age 76) Des Moines, Iowa, U.S.
- Party: Democratic
- Spouse: Joe
- Education: Truman State University (BS); University of Northern Iowa (MA)
- Website: Winckler's website

Cindy Winckler (born May 27, 1950) is an American politician and member of the Iowa Senate for the 49th District. Previously, she served in the Iowa House of Representatives for the 90th District. She served in the Iowa House of Representatives from 2001 to 2013. She received her BS from Truman State University and an MA from the University of Northern Iowa.

As of September 2011, Winckler serves on several committees in the Iowa House - the Appropriations, Education, Environmental Protection, and Human Resources committees. She also serves as the ranking member of the Education Appropriations Subcommittee.

Winckler was first elected in 2000, defeating incumbent Republican John P. Sunderbruch. She was re-elected in 2010 with 3,342 votes, defeating Republican opponent Ray Ambrose with 69% of the vote.

== Electoral history ==
*incumbent

Election	Political result	Candidate	Party	Votes	%
Iowa House of Representatives elections, 2000; District 44; Turnout: 10,990	Democratic gain from Republican	Cindy Winckler	Democratic	5,825	53.0
Iowa House of Representatives elections, 2000; District 44; Turnout: 10,990	Democratic gain from Republican	John P. Sunderbruch*	Republican	5,156	47.0
Iowa House of Representatives elections, 2002; District 86; Turnout: 6,451	Democratic (newly redistricted)	Cindy Winckler*	Democratic	4,063	63.0
Iowa House of Representatives elections, 2002; District 86; Turnout: 6,451	Democratic (newly redistricted)	Judith Malone	Republican	2,141	33.2
Iowa House of Representatives elections, 2002; District 86; Turnout: 6,451	Democratic (newly redistricted)	Lawrence Wittstruck	Libertarian	240	3.7
Iowa House of Representatives elections, 2004; District 86; Turnout: 10,798	Democratic hold	Cindy Winckler*	Democratic	6,887	63.8
Iowa House of Representatives elections, 2004; District 86; Turnout: 10,798	Democratic hold	Dan Vance	Republican	3,892	36.0
Iowa House of Representatives elections, 2006; District 86; Turnout: 6,657	Democratic hold	Cindy L. Winckler*	Democratic	4,598	69.1
Iowa House of Representatives elections, 2006; District 86; Turnout: 6,657	Democratic hold	Susie Bell	Republican	1,792	26.9
Iowa House of Representatives elections, 2008; District 86; Turnout: 11,039	Democratic hold	Cindy L. Winckler*	Democratic	7,645	69.3
Iowa House of Representatives elections, 2008; District 86; Turnout: 11,039	Democratic hold	Joseph R. Sturgis	Republican	3,370	30.5
Iowa House of Representatives elections, 2010; District 86; Turnout: 6,251	Democratic hold	Cindy Winckler*	Democratic	3,342	53.5
Iowa House of Representatives elections, 2010; District 86; Turnout: 6,251	Democratic hold	Ray Ambrose	Republican	2,763	44.2

Iowa Senate
Preceded by Chris Cournoyer	49th District; 2023– present	Succeeded by Incumbent
Iowa House of Representatives
Preceded by	86th District; 2013 – 2023	Succeeded by Adam Zabner
Preceded by Dick Weidman	86th District; 2003 – 2013	Succeeded by
Preceded by John Sunderbruch	44th District; 2001 – 2003	Succeeded by Polly Granzow
