= Michael Jagger =

Michael Jagger may refer to:

- Mick Jagger (Sir Michael Philip Jagger, born 1943), English musician, singer, songwriter and actor
- Michael Jagger, a fictional spy in the novels of William Garner

== See also ==
- Michael Jäger (disambiguation)
