= Darrell Hanson =

American politician (born 1954)

Member of the Iowa House of Representatives from the 27th district
- In office January 11, 1993 – January 8, 1995
- Preceded by: Joseph M. Kremer
- Succeeded by: Joseph M. Kremer

Member of the Iowa House of Representatives from the 48th district
- In office January 10, 1983 – January 10, 1993
- Preceded by: Wayne D. Bennett
- Succeeded by: James F. Hahn

Member of the Iowa House of Representatives from the 18th district
- In office January 8, 1979 – January 9, 1983
- Preceded by: Terry Dyrland
- Succeeded by: Richard W. Welden

Personal details
- Born: Darrell Roy Hanson; August 8, 1954 (age 72) Astoria, Oregon, U.S.
- Party: Republican
- Spouse: Janet Clark
- Education: University of Iowa; University of Northern Iowa
- Occupation: University instructor

Darrell Roy Hanson (born August 8, 1954) is an American politician in the state of Iowa.

Hanson was born in Astoria, Oregon. He attended the University of Kansas, the University of Iowa, and the University of Northern Iowa and is a university instructor. He served in the Iowa House of Representatives from 1979 to 1995, as a Republican.
