= Joseph Kremer =

American politician (1921–2010)

Joseph M. Kremer (19 August 1921 – 30 June 2010) was an American politician.

Joseph Kremer was born in Jesup, Iowa, on 19 August 1921 to Matt Kremer and his wife, Matilda Lardy. Following his graduation from the high school in his hometown in 1939, the younger Kremer served in the United States Army during World War II, through to his discharge in December 1946. Six months after, he married Ellen Janice Harn, with whom he raised eight children. Kremer was active in several county-level civic and agricultural organizations, and retired from farming in 1986.

Kremer, a Republican was first elected to the Iowa House of Representatives for Buchanan County in 1984, and served continuously until 1993, when fellow Republican Darrell Hanson represented District 27 for a single term. Kremer returned to the seat in 1995, was reelected once more, and retired at the end of his sixth term in 1999.

He died on 30 June 2010 at the Buchanan County Health Center Long-Term Care Unit in Independence, Iowa.
