= Neil P. Harrison =

American politician (born 1967)

Member of the Iowa House of Representatives from the 44th district
- In office 9 January 1995 – 12 January 1997
- Preceded by: Robert Arnould
- Succeeded by: Ronald Kinzer

Personal details
- Born: Neil P. Harrison; 29 April 1967 (age 59) Davenport, Iowa, U.S.
- Party: Republican
- Occupation: politician

Neil P. Harrison (born 29 April 1967) is an American former politician.

Harrison was born to parents Neil E. Harrison and Helene Schmidt in Davenport, Iowa, on 29 April 1967. He had two brothers and one sister. After graduating from Davenport West High School in his hometown, Harrison attended Western Illinois University and St. Ambrose University.

Politically, Harrison was affiliated with the Republican Party, serving from 1990 to 1994 as a member of the Davenport City Council from the first ward, then holding the District 44 seat in the Iowa House of Representatives from 1995 to 1997.
