= Robert Arnould =

American politician (born 1953)

Robert C. Arnould

Member of the Iowa House of Representatives from the 44th district
- In office January 11, 1993 – January 8, 1995
- Preceded by: Andy McKean
- Succeeded by: Neil P. Harrison

Member of the Iowa House of Representatives from the 42nd district
- In office January 10, 1983 – January 10, 1993
- Preceded by: Ralph Rosenberg
- Succeeded by: Robert L. Rafferty

Member of the Iowa House of Representatives from the 82nd district
- In office December 13, 1977 – January 9, 1983
- Preceded by: Thomas Higgins
- Succeeded by: Dorothy Carpenter

Personal details
- Born: Robert C. Arnould Jr. September 23, 1953 (age 72) Davenport, Iowa, U.S.
- Party: Democratic
- Spouse(s): Betsy Brandsgard (m. 1983, divorced) Marilyn
- Occupation: politician

Robert C. Arnould (born September 23, 1953) is an American former politician. He was first seated as a member of Iowa House of Representatives from District 82 from 1977 to 1983, then represented District 42 until 1993. Arnould served his ninth and final term as state representative for District 44.

== Early life ==
Robert C. Arnould Jr. was born in Davenport, Iowa, on September 23, 1953. His father, also named Robert, was a plumber, and his mother, Gertrude Bloom, was a computer programmer who worked for the Rock Island Arsenal for 25 years. The younger Robert Arnould attended Madison Grade School and Central High School, both in Davenport. He studied at Brown University until 1974, then transferred to Iowa State University until 1976, and later enrolled at St. Ambrose College. After completing his education, Arnould farmed in Davenport.

== Career ==
Arnould served as chairman of the Scott County Democratic Party from 1976 to 1978. On December 13, 1977, he succeeded Thomas J. Higgins as the state representative from District 82. Between 1983 and 1993, Arnould occupied the District 42 seat. He remained a member of the Iowa House of Representatives until January 8, 1995, retiring from public office as a representative of District 44. Arnould was assistant majority leader in the state house from 1983 to 1987, then served as majority leader until 1991, and was speaker of the Iowa House until 1993, when he became minority leader.

After stepping down from the Iowa legislature, Arnould moved to Sacramento, California, started working for the California Credit Union League in May 1995, and later became director of state legislative affairs for California and Nevada, then senior vice president of government affairs in 2004.

== Personal life ==
Arnould married Betsy Brandsgard in 1983, whom he later divorced. Arnould subsequently settled in El Dorado Hills, California, and remarried, to Marilyn.
