= Annette Sweeney =

American politician (born 1957)

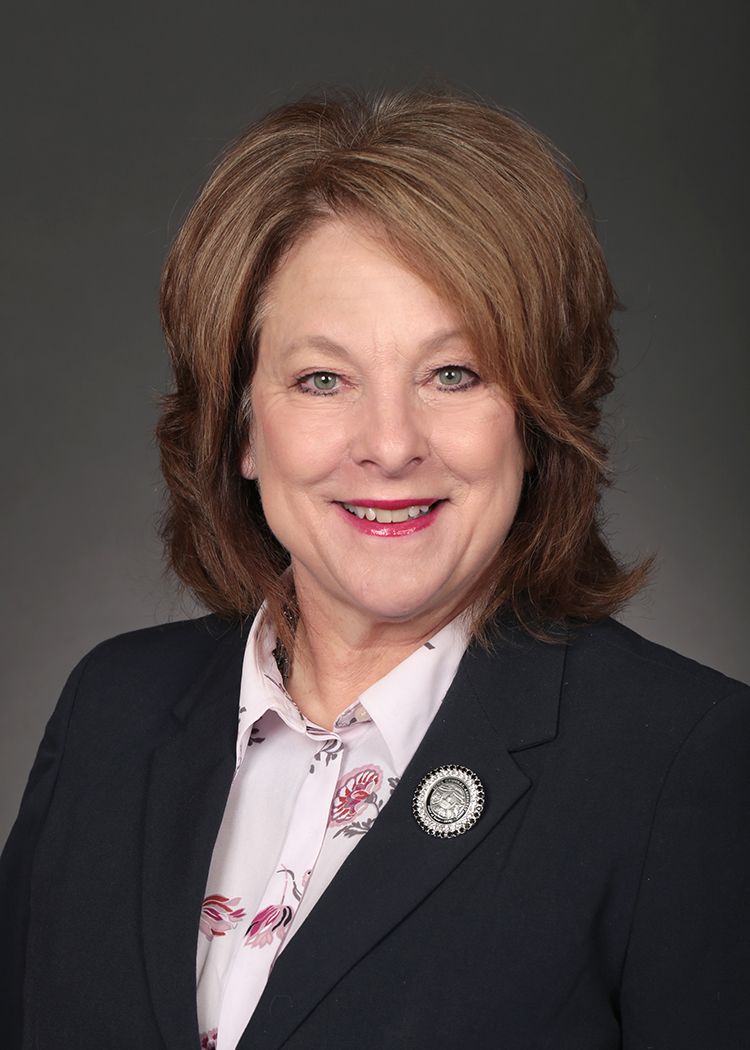

Member of the Iowa Senate from the 27th district
- Incumbent
- Assumed office April 16, 2018
- Preceded by: Bill Dix
- Constituency: District 27 - (2023-Present); District 25 - (2018-2023)

Member of the Iowa House of Representatives from the 44th district
- In office 2009–2013
- Preceded by: Polly Granzow
- Succeeded by: Rob Taylor

Personal details
- Born: December 9, 1957 (age 68) Buckeye, Iowa, U.S.
- Party: Republican
- Education: Concordia University, Nebraska (BA)

Annette Sweeney (born December 9, 1957) is an American politician who is the Iowa State Senator for the 27th District. A Republican, she has been in the Iowa Senate since 2018, when she won a special election to replace Bill Dix after Dix resigned from the Senate.

Prior to her election to the Senate, Sweeney was a member of the Iowa House of Representatives from 2009 to 2013.

Sweeney was born in Buckeye, Iowa. She went to college at Concordia University Nebraska. She taught middle school literature in Peoria, Illinois, for a short time before taking over the family farm. She married David Sweeney in 1985.

== Election results ==
=== 2018 General Election ===
2018 General Election
Party	Candidate	Votes	%
Republican	Annette Sweeney	16,621	61.6%
Democratic	Tracy Freese	10,345	38.3%

=== 2022 General Election ===
2022 General Election
Party	Candidate	Votes	%
Republican	Annette Sweeney	16,889	66.6%
Democratic	Sam Cox	8,418	33.2%

Iowa Senate
Preceded by Amanda Ragan	27th District; 2023 – present	Succeeded by Incumbent
Preceded by Bill Dix	25th District; 2018 – 2023	Succeeded by Herman Quirmbach
Iowa House of Representatives
Preceded by Polly Granzow	44th District; 2009 – 2013	Succeeded by Rob Taylor
