= Larry McBurney =

American politician (born 1986)

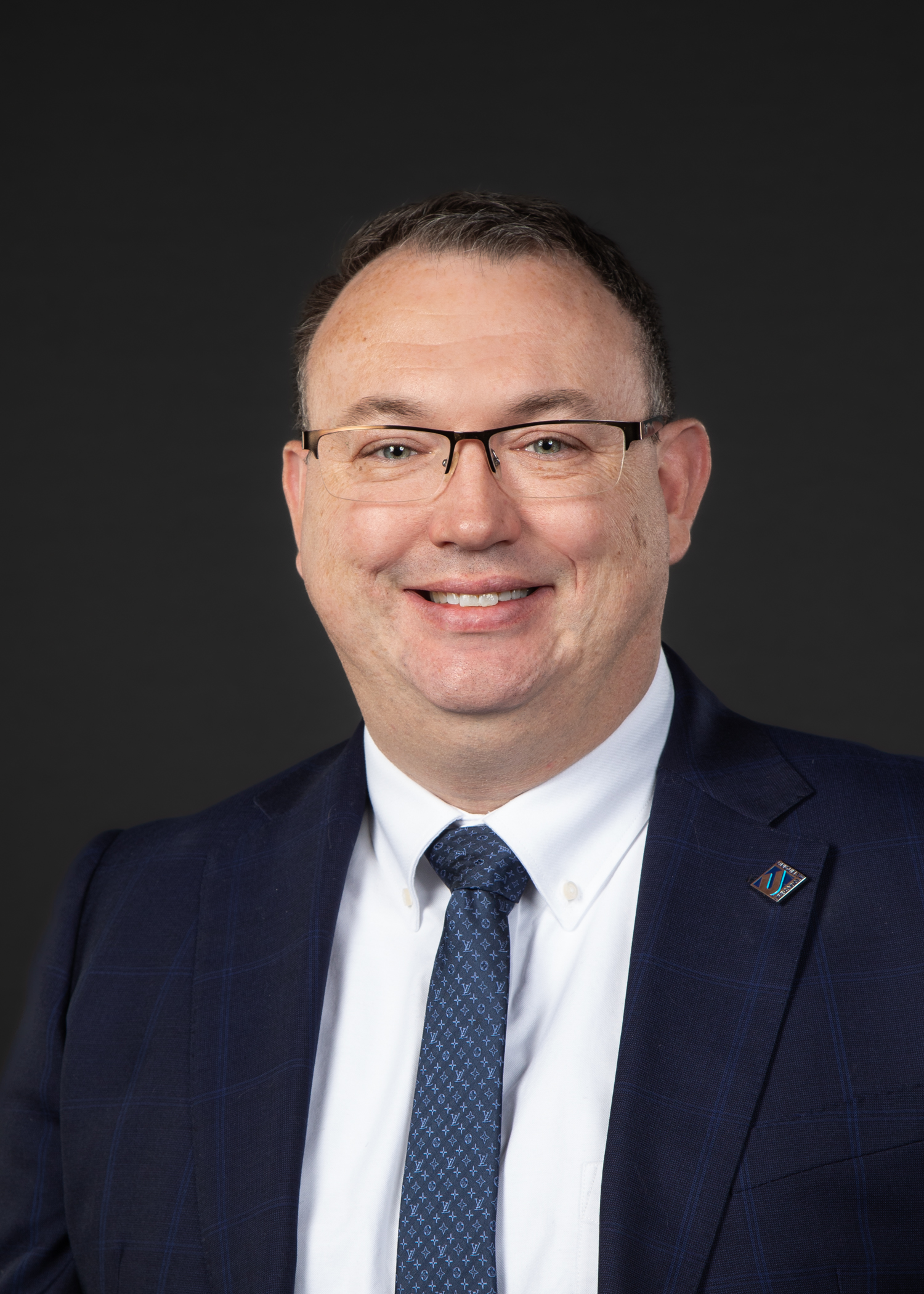

Member of the Iowa House of Representatives from the 44th district
- Incumbent
- Assumed office January 13, 2025
- Preceded by: John Forbes

Personal details
- Born: 1986 (age 39–40) Des Moines, Iowa, U.S.
- Party: Democratic

Military service
- Allegiance: United States
- Branch/service: Iowa Air National Guard
- Years of service: 2003–2014 (Active)
- Rank: Staff Sergeant
- Battles/wars: Iraq War, War in Afghanistan (2001-2021)
- Awards: Air Reserve Forces Meritorious Service Medal, National Defense Service Medal, Iraq Campaign Medal, Global War on Terrorism Expeditionary Medal

Lawrence McBurney is an American politician serving in the Iowa House of Representatives. He is a Democrat.

== Early life ==
McBurney served in the Iowa Air National Guard from 2003 to 2014 and worked for Wells Fargo.

McBurney married Lusita, who leads the Filipino American Society of Iowa, in 2021. His father Larry Dwaine McBurney died in 2024.

== Political career ==
McBurney first ran for the Urbandale City Council in 2019, was elected in 2021, and ran against Jason Menke in the Democratic Party primary for the District 44 of the Iowa House of Representatives in 2024. McBurney advanced to the general election, defeating Libertarian Party candidate Jake Heard.

=== Committee assignments ===
As of January 2025, McBurney serves on the following committees in the Iowa House.

- Government Oversight (ranking member)
- Commerce
- Labor and Workforce
- Local Government
- State Government
- Ways and Means
