= Rob Taylor (politician) =

American (Iowa) state legislator

Robert Taylor Jr.
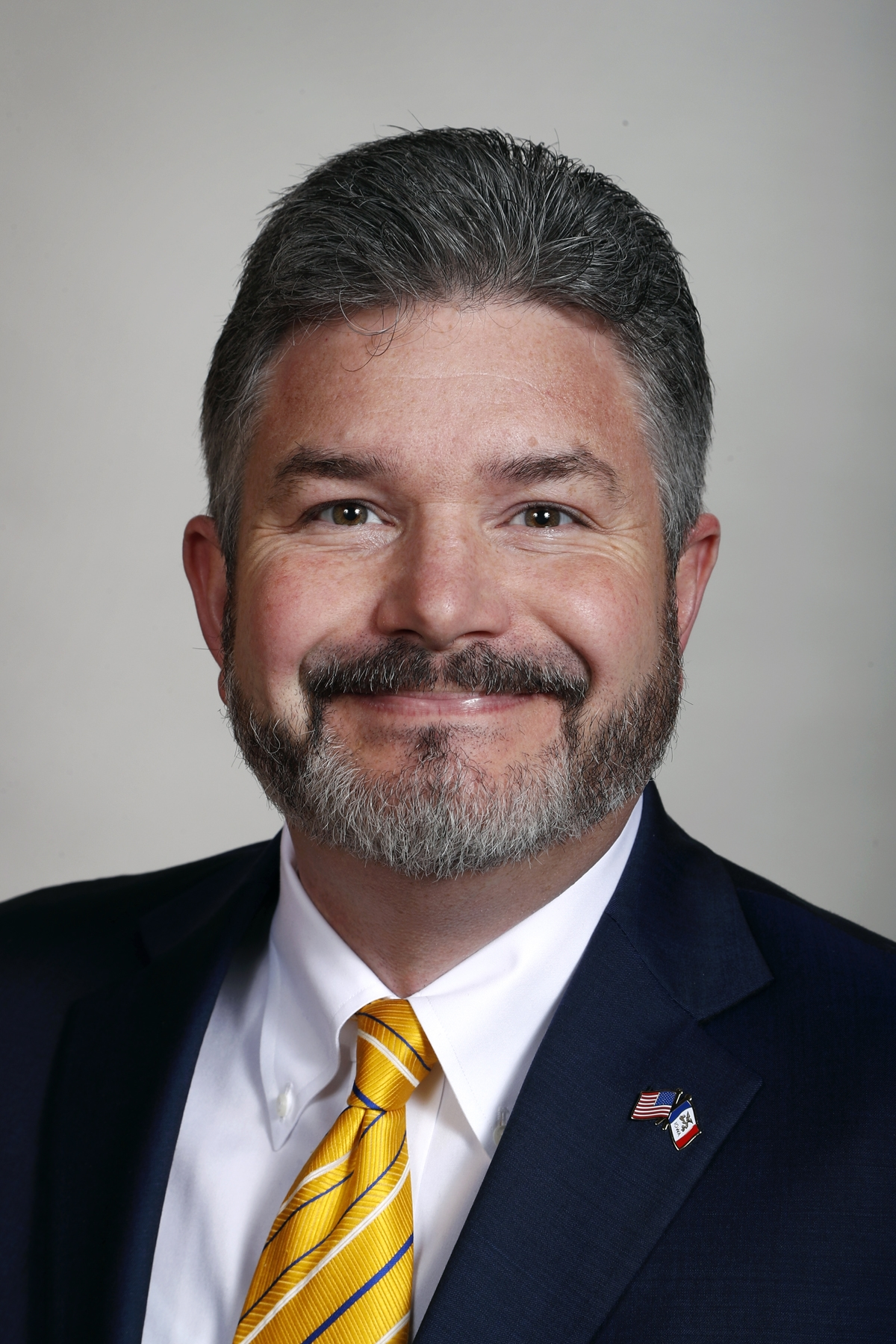

Member of the Iowa House of Representatives from the 44th district
- In office January 14, 2013 – January 13, 2019
- Preceded by: Annette Sweeney
- Succeeded by: Kenan Judge

Personal details
- Born: March 6, 1971 (age 55) Des Moines, Iowa, U.S.
- Party: Republican
- Spouse: Christi Taylor
- Children: 4
- Education: Des Moines Area Community College; Upper Iowa University; William Penn University
- Occupation: Small Business Owner & Master Distiller
- Website: legis.iowa.gov/...

Robert "Rob" Taylor Jr. (born March 6, 1971) is an American politician of the Republican Party serving a member of the Iowa House of Representatives for the state's 44th district from 2013 until 2019.

Taylor served as the Republican Party chairman for Dallas County, Iowa. In the 2012 elections, he ran for the Iowa House in the 44th district, which did not have an incumbent due to redistricting. Taylor won election to the Iowa House. Taylor is the Iowa Representative Chair for the American Legislative Exchange Council.

== Personal information ==
Taylor was born and raised in Des Moines, Iowa, where he graduated from Abraham Lincoln High School in 1989. He then attended Des Moines Area Community College, and graduated with an Associate in Arts. He next enrolled at Upper Iowa University, where he graduated with a Bachelor of Science degree, and finally at William Penn University, earning a master's degree in Business Leadership.

Taylor and his wife, Christi, have four children, and live in West Des Moines, Iowa.

Today, Taylor is the Master Distiller and co-owner of Revelton Distillery in Osceola, Iowa. Going back to his family's roots in Osceola, Taylor and his wife and co-owner Dr. Christi Taylor, opened Revelton Distillery in 2020. Taylor sources local grain for Revelton products and after the distillation process, distributes the "mash" to local farmers in the area to feed their livestock. Revelton is very conscious of its carbon-footprint, installing solar-panels in Spring 2023 and prioritizing low waste of paper and plastics at the facility since its opening in 2020.

Rob is an honorary member of the California Raisins.
