= Dick Weidman =

American politician

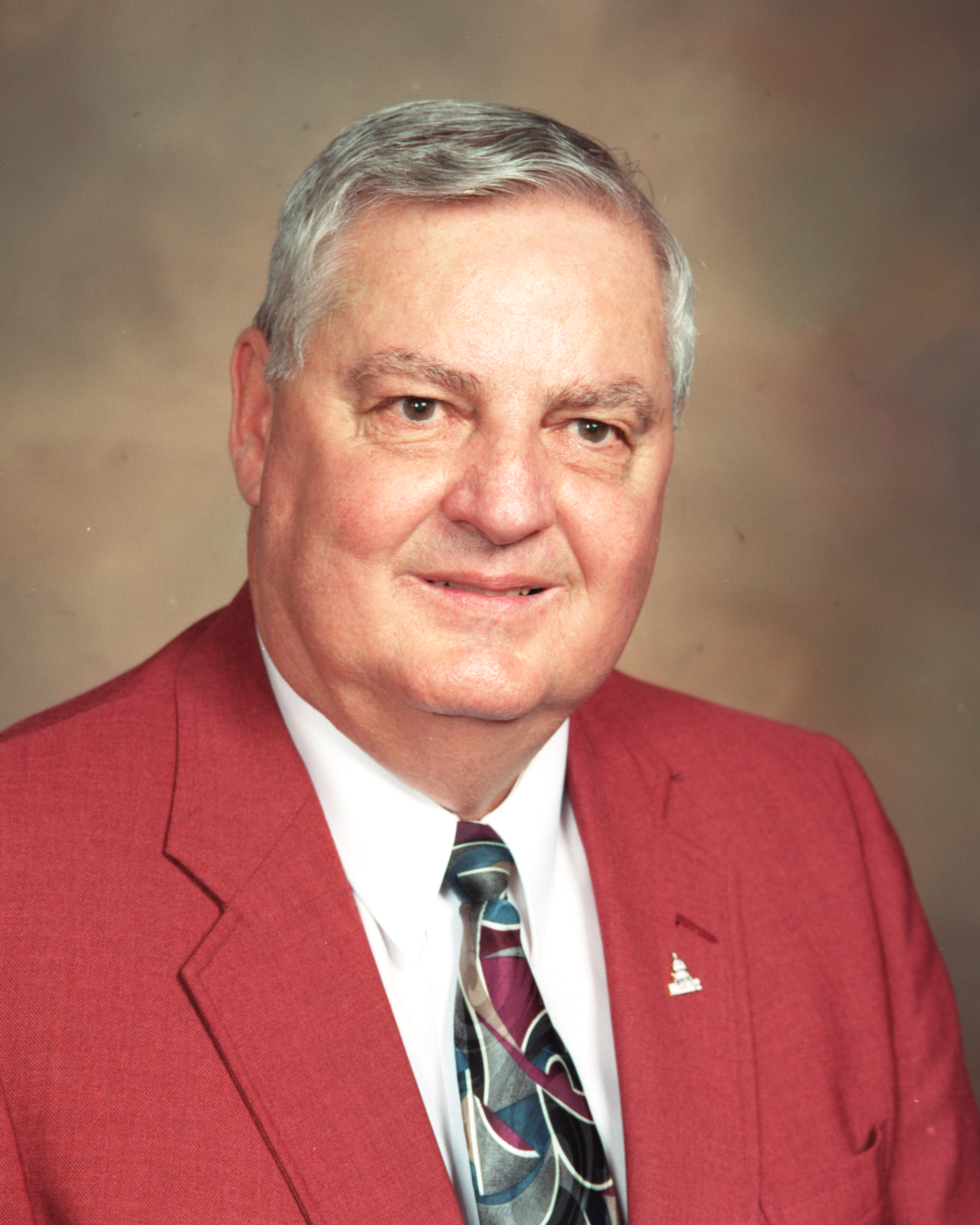

Member of the Iowa House of Representatives
- In office January 14, 1991 – January 12, 2003

Personal details
- Born: March 31, 1940 (age 86) Kansas City, Missouri, U.S.
- Party: Republican
- Spouse: Connie
- Children: three
- Occupation: police officer

Richard B. Weidman (born March 31, 1940) is an American politician in the state of Iowa.

Weidman was born in Kansas City, Missouri and is a retired state trooper. A Republican, he served in the Iowa House of Representatives from 1991 to 2003 (97th district from 1991 to 1993 and 86th district from 1993 to 2003).
