= Polly Granzow =

American politician (born 1941)

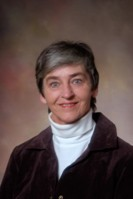

Member of the Iowa House of Representatives from the 44th district
- In office 2003–2009
- Preceded by: Cindy Winckler
- Succeeded by: Annette Sweeney

Personal details
- Born: September 29, 1941 (age 84) Eldora, Iowa, U.S.
- Party: Republican
- Website: Granzow's website

Polly Granzow (born September 29, 1941) is a former Iowa State Representative from the 44th District. She served in the Iowa House of Representatives from 2003 to 2009. She received her BA from the University of Iowa and her MA from the University of Northern Iowa.

Granzow was re-elected in 2006 with 5,559 votes (50%), defeating Democratic opponent Tim Hoy.

== Education ==
Granzow graduated from Eldora High School and later obtained her B.A. in Spanish and teaching from the University of Iowa. She also received her M.A. in Teaching English to Speakers of Other Languages (TESOL) from the University of Northern Iowa.

== Career ==
Granzow served on several committees in the Iowa House - the Economic Growth committee; the Veterans Affairs committee; and the Human Resources committee, where she is the ranking member. She also serves on the Health and Human Services Appropriations Subcommittee.

Outside politics Granzow is a partner in farming with her husband. She is also a former teacher and County Supervisor for Former Hardin County.

== Organizations ==
=== Former chairs ===
- County Central Committee
- Greenbelt Home Care
- Central Iowa Juvenile Detention Center

=== Former region chairs ===
- Branstad for Governor
- Education Advisor to Cooper Evans

=== Memberships ===
- Republican Women
- SATUCI (Substance Abuse)
- Empowerment Area
- Prevention of Disabilities
- Child Care Advisory Board
- Lions
- Farm Bureau
- Lutheran Church

== Family ==
Granzow is married to her husband David and together they have two daughters, one son and six grandchildren.

Iowa House of Representatives
Preceded by Cindy Winckler	44th District; 2003 – 2009	Succeeded by Annette Sweeney
