= Michael D. Jager =

American politician (born 1968)

Michael D. Jager (born 3 August 1968) is an American politician.

Michael Jager was born on 3 August 1968 to parents Ivan and Carolyn Jager. He graduated from La Porte City High School in La Porte City, Iowa, and studied history and political science at the University of Dubuque. He served in the United States Army from 1985 to 1987, when he transferred to the Iowa Army National Guard. He left the military in 1991. Jager was a member of the La Porte City Planning and Zoning Commission and other county-level civic and political organizations. During his single term on the Iowa House of Representatives from 1999 to 2001, Jager held the District 27 seat and was affiliated with the Republican Party.
