= John Forbes (Iowa politician) =

American politician (born 1956)

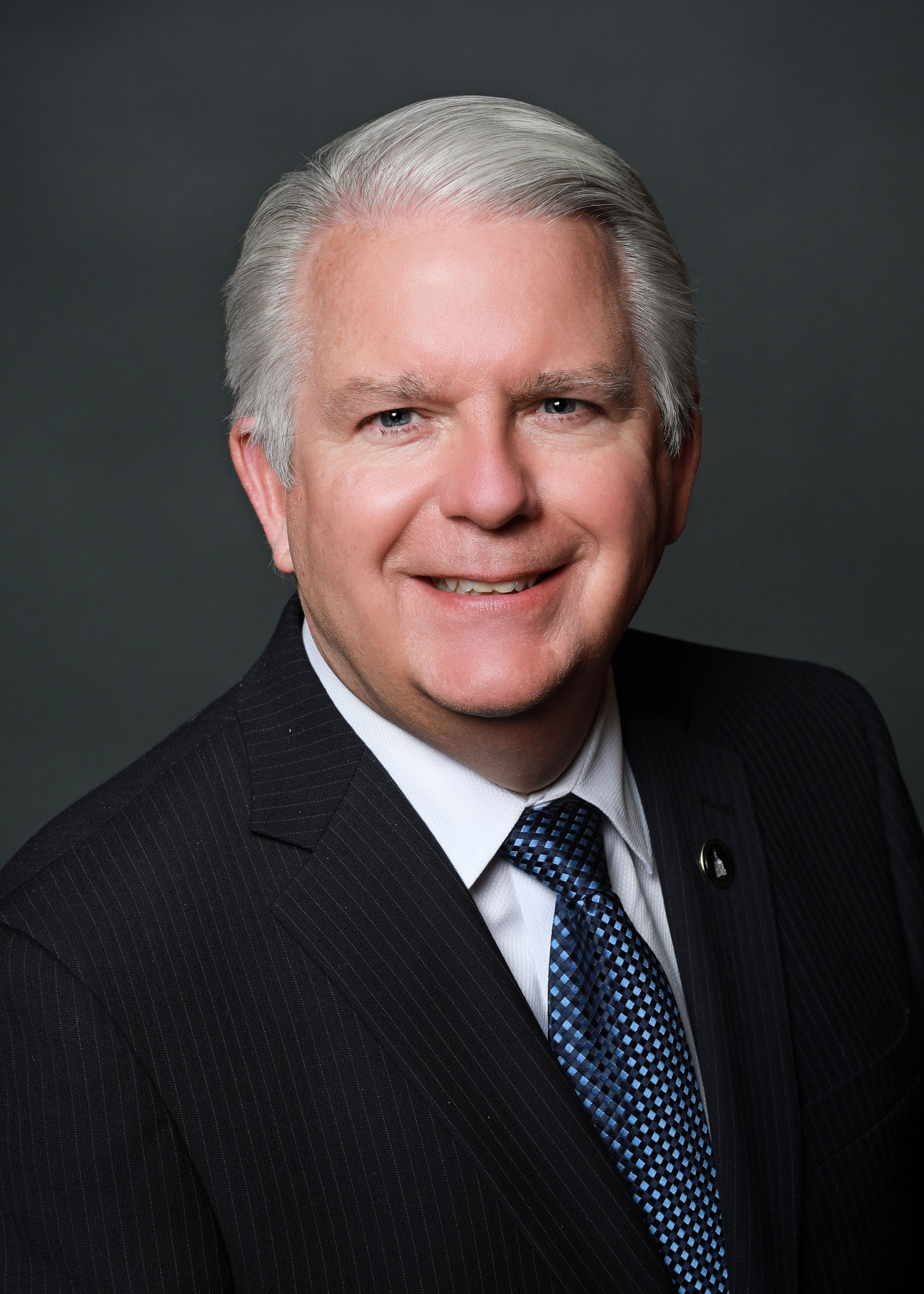

Member of the Iowa House of Representatives from the 44th district
- In office January 14, 2013 – January 13, 2025
- Preceded by: Lance Horbach
- Succeeded by: Larry McBurney

Personal details
- Born: October 21, 1956 (age 70) Clarion, Iowa, U.S.
- Party: Democratic
- Spouse: Cindy
- Relations: Dale M. Cochran (father-in-law)
- Children: 2 children
- Education: Drake University (BS)

John Forbes (born October 21, 1956) is an American politician. A Democrat, he served in the Iowa House of Representatives from 2013 to 2025.

As of May 2013, Forbes serves on several committees in the Iowa House – the Commerce, Local Government, Transportation, and Ways and Means committees. He also serves as a member of the Health and Human Services Appropriations Subcommittee.

Forbes was born in Clarion, Iowa, and raised in Eagle Grove, Iowa. He has been a small business owner for over 32 years. He is a pharmacist and owns and operates Medicap Pharmacy in Urbandale, Iowa.

Forbes retired from the Iowa House of Representatives in 2024 to run for a seat on the Polk County Board of Supervisors, losing to Jill Altringer. Forbes ran again in 2026, and was elected uncontested for board district one.

== Electoral history ==
*incumbent

Election	Political result	Candidate	Party	Votes	%
Iowa House of Representatives primary elections, 2012; District 3	Democratic	John Forbes	Democratic	unopposed	
Iowa House of Representatives general elections, 2012; District 3 Turnout: 18,032	Democratic (newly redistricted)	John Forbes	Democratic	9,113	50.54%
Iowa House of Representatives general elections, 2012; District 3 Turnout: 18,032	Democratic (newly redistricted)	Mike Brown	Republican	8,044	44.61%

== Organizations ==
Forbes is a member of the following organizations:

- Member and past president of the Urbandale Chamber of Commerce
- Board member for the Urbandale Library Foundation Board
- Des Moines Area Metropolitan Advisory Committee
- Past president of the Iowa Pharmacy Association
- Past president of the Polk County Pharmacists Association

== Honors and awards ==
Forbes received the Bowl of Hygenia Award from the Iowa Pharmacy Association in 2010 for his work in community service. In 2011, he won the Hero's of the Heartland Award from the American Red Cross.

== Family ==
Forbes and his wife Cindy reside in Urbandale, Iowa. Together they have two children, Adam and Meredith. He is the son-in-law of former Iowa Secretary of Agriculture Dale M. Cochran.
