= Andra Atteberry =

American politician in the state of Iowa

Member of the Iowa House of Representatives
- In office January 8, 2001 – January 12, 2003

Personal details
- Born: April 8, 1943 (age 83) Fort Sill, Oklahoma, United States
- Party: Democratic
- Spouse: Duane Atteberry (m. 1966; died 2012)
- Occupation: Teacher, writer

Andra Atteberry (born April 8, 1943) is an American politician in the state of Iowa. A Democrat, she served in the Iowa House of Representatives from 2001 to 2003 as the representative for the 27th district.

== Early life ==
Atteberry was born on April 8, 1943, in Fort Sill, Oklahoma. She attended Southern Illinois University where she received a bachelors of science degree in education. She served as chair of the Delaware County Democratic Central Committee. She is married to Duane and the couple have two children.

She was a member of the Delaware County YWCA Domestic Violence Program Board, the United Methodist Church, the Manchester chapter of the General Federation of Women's Clubs, the P.E.O. Sisterhood and the Farm Bureau. She works as a freelance writer.

== Political career ==
Atteberry was first elected to the Iowa House of Representatives in the 2000 general election, serving as the representative for the 27th district. She was a member of the committees for agriculture, economic growth and human resources. She served in office between January 8, 2001, and January 12, 2003.
