= 2020 Iowa House of Representatives election =

- November 3, 2020

All 100 seats in the Iowa House of Representatives 51 seats needed for a majority
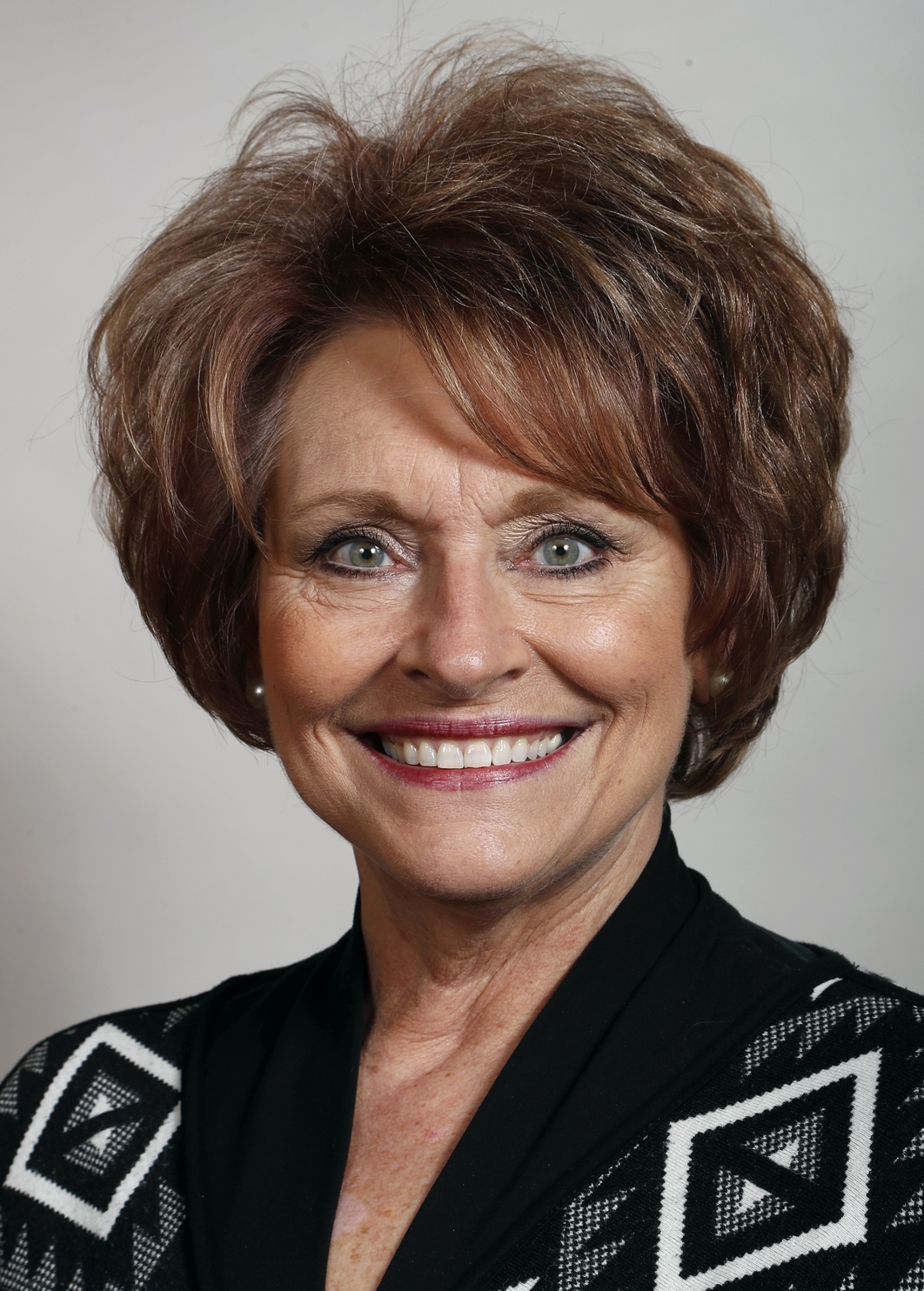

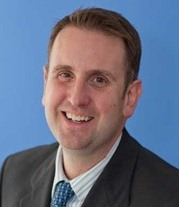
	Majority party	Minority party
Leader	Linda Upmeyer (retired)	Todd Prichard
Party	Republican	Democratic
Leader since	January 14, 2016	January 14, 2019
Leader's seat	54th district	52nd district
Last election	54	46
Seats before	53	47
Seats won	59	41
Seat change	▲6	▼6
Popular vote	786,409	726,718
Percentage	51.45%	47.45%
- Results of the elections: Republican gain Democratic gain Republican hold Democratic hold
Speaker of the House before election
Linda Upmeyer
Republican
Elected Speaker of the House
Pat Grassley
Republican

Elections to the Iowa House of Representatives were held on November 3, 2020.

In October 2020, The Washington Post identified this state election as one of eight whose outcomes could affect partisan balance during post-census redistricting.

== Predictions ==
Source	Ranking	As of
The Cook Political Report	Tossup	October 21, 2020

== Polling ==
Hypothetical polling in District 67

Generic Republican vs. Generic Democrat

Poll source	Date(s) administered	Sample size (Note: Key: A – all adults RV – registered voters LV – likely voters V – unclear)	Margin of error	Generic Republican	Generic Democrat	Undecided
Public Policy Polling/DLCC (Note: The DLCC exclusively supports Democratic candidates)	September 23–25, 2020	300 (V)	± 5.7%	41%	49%	10%

== Results summary ==
Summary of the November 3, 2020 Iowa House of Representatives election results
Party	Candidates	Votes		Seats				
Party	Candidates	No.	%	Before	Up	Won	After	+/–
Republican	80	786,409	51.35%	53	53	59	59	▲6
Democratic	91	726,718	47.45%	47	47	41	41	▼6
Libertarian	4	8,788	0.57%	0	0	0	0	Steady
Independent	3	522	0.03%	0	0	0	0	Steady
Write-in		9,104	0.59%	0	0	0	0	Steady
Total		1,531,541	100.00%	100	100	100	100	Steady

Popular vote
Republican	50.93%
Democratic	47.85%
Others	1.22%

House seats
Republican	59%
Democratic	41%

=== Closest races ===
Seats where the margin of victory was under 10%:

1. District 39, 0.7% gain
2. District 38, 0.78% gain
3. District 82, 1.08%
4. District 60, 2.56%
5. District 29, 3.14%
6. District 16, 5.56%
7. District 83, 5.84% gain
8. District 81, 6.28% gain
9. District 67, 6.4% gain
10. District 37, 6.44%
11. District 15, 6.8%
12. District 58, 7.28% gain
13. District 44, 7.33%
14. District 26, 7.42%
15. District 52, 7.44%
16. District 95, 7.76%
17. District 55, 8.7%
18. District 68, 9.18%

== Summary of results by State House District ==
State House District	Incumbent	Party	Elected	Party
1	John Wills	Rep	John Wills	Rep
2	Megan Jones	Rep	Megan Jones	Rep
3	Dan Huseman	Rep	Dennis Bush	Rep
4	Skyler Wheeler	Rep	Skyler Wheeler	Rep
5	Thomas Jeneary	Rep	Thomas Jeneary	Rep
6	Jacob Bossman	Rep	Jacob Bossman	Rep
7	Tedd Gassman	Rep	Henry Stone	Rep
8	Terry Baxter	Rep	Terry Baxter	Rep
9	Ann Meyer	Rep	Ann Meyer	Rep
10	Mike Sexton	Rep	Mike Sexton	Rep
11	Gary Worthan	Rep	Gary Worthan	Rep
12	Brian Best	Rep	Brian Best	Rep
13	Chris Hall	Dem	Chris Hall	Dem
14	Timothy Kacena	Dem	Steve Hansen	Dem
15	Charlie McConkey	Dem	Charlie McConkey	Dem
16	Mary Ann Hanusa	Rep	Brent Siegrist	Rep
17	Matt Windschitl	Rep	Matt Windschitl	Rep
18	Steven Holt	Rep	Steven Holt	Rep
19	Chris Hagenow	Rep	Carter Nordman	Rep
20	Ray Sorensen	Rep	Ray Sorensen	Rep
21	Tom Moore	Rep	Tom Moore	Rep
22	Jon Jacobsen	Rep	Jon Jacobsen	Rep
23	David Sieck	Rep	David Sieck	Rep
24	Cecil Dolecheck	Rep	Cecil Dolecheck	Rep
25	Stan Gustafson	Rep	Stan Gustafson	Rep
26	Scott Ourth	Dem	Brooke Boden	Rep
27	Joel Fry	Rep	Joel Fry	Rep
28	Jon Thorup	Rep	Jon Thorup	Rep
29	Wes Breckenridge	Dem	Wes Breckenridge	Dem
30	Brian Lohse	Rep	Brian Lohse	Rep
31	Rick Olson	Dem	Rick Olson	Dem
32	Ruth Ann Gaines	Dem	Ruth Ann Gaines	Dem
33	Brian Meyer	Dem	Brian Meyer	Dem
34	Bruce Hunter	Dem	Bruce Hunter	Dem
35	Ako Abdul-Samad	Dem	Ako Abdul-Samad	Dem
36	Marti Anderson	Dem	Marti Anderson	Dem
37	John Landon	Rep	John Landon	Rep
38	Heather Matson	Dem	Garrett Gobble	Rep
39	Karin Derry	Dem	Eddie Andrews	Rep
40	John Forbes	Dem	John Forbes	Dem
41	Jo Oldson	Dem	Jo Oldson	Dem
42	Kristin Sunde	Dem	Kristin Sunde	Dem
43	Jennifer Konfrst	Dem	Jennifer Konfrst	Dem
44	Kenan Judge	Dem	Kenan Judge	Dem
45	Beth Wessel-Kroeschell	Dem	Beth Wessel-Kroeschell	Dem
46	Ross Wilburn	Dem	Ross Wilburn	Dem
47	Phil Thompson	Rep	Phil Thompson	Rep
48	Robert Bacon	Rep	Robert Bacon	Rep
49	Dave Deyoe	Rep	Dave Deyoe	Rep
50	Pat Grassley	Rep	Pat Grassley	Rep
51	Jane Bloomingdale	Rep	Jane Bloomingdale	Rep
52	Todd Prichard	Dem	Todd Prichard	Dem
53	Sharon Steckman	Dem	Sharon Steckman	Dem
54	Linda Upmeyer	Rep	Shannon Latham	Rep
55	Michael Bergan	Rep	Michael Bergan	Rep
56	Anne Osmundson	Rep	Anne Osmundson	Rep
57	Shannon Lundgren	Rep	Shannon Lundgren	Rep
58	Andy McKean	Dem	Steven Bradley	Rep
59	Bob Kressig	Dem	Bob Kressig	Dem
60	Dave Williams	Dem	Dave Williams	Dem
61	Timi Brown-Powers	Dem	Timi Brown-Powers	Dem
62	Ras Smith	Dem	Ras Smith	Dem
63	Sandy Salmon	Rep	Sandy Salmon	Rep
64	Bruce Bearinger	Dem	Chad Ingels	Rep
65	Liz Bennett	Dem	Liz Bennett	Dem
66	Art Staed	Dem	Art Staed	Dem
67	Ashley Hinson	Rep	Eric Gjerde	Dem
68	Molly Donahue	Dem	Molly Donahue	Dem
69	Kirsten Running-Marquardt	Dem	Kirsten Running-Marquardt	Dem
70	Tracy Ehlert	Dem	Tracy Ehlert	Dem
71	Mark Smith	Dem	Sue Cahill	Dem
72	Dean Fisher	Rep	Dean Fisher	Rep
73	Bobby Kaufmann	Rep	Bobby Kaufmann	Rep
74	David Jacoby	Dem	David Jacoby	Dem
75	Thomas Gerhold	Rep	Thomas Gerhold	Rep
76	David Maxwell	Rep	David Maxwell	Rep
77	Amy Nielsen	Dem	Amy Nielsen	Dem
78	Jarad Klein	Rep	Jarad Klein	Rep
79	Dustin Hite	Rep	Dustin Hite	Rep
80	Holly Brink	Rep	Holly Brink	Rep
81	Mary Gaskill	Dem	Cherielynn Westrich	Rep
82	Jeff Shipley	Rep	Jeff Shipley	Rep
83	Jeff Kurtz	Dem	Martin Graber	Rep
84	Joe Mitchell	Rep	Joe Mitchell	Rep
85	Vicki Lensing	Dem	Christina Bohannan	Dem
86	Mary Mascher	Dem	Mary Mascher	Dem
87	Dennis Cohoon	Dem	Dennis Cohoon	Dem
88	David Kerr	Rep	David Kerr	Rep
89	Monica Kurth	Dem	Monica Kurth	Dem
90	Cindy Winckler	Dem	Cindy Winckler	Dem
91	Gary Carlson	Rep	Mark Cisneros	Rep
92	Ross Paustian	Rep	Ross Paustian	Rep
93	Phyllis Thede	Dem	Phyllis Thede	Dem
94	Gary Mohr	Rep	Gary Mohr	Rep
95	Louie Zumbach	Rep	Charlie McClintock	Rep
96	Lee Hein	Rep	Lee Hein	Rep
97	Norlin Mommsen	Rep	Norlin Mommsen	Rep
98	Mary Wolfe	Dem	Mary Wolfe	Dem
99	Lindsay James	Dem	Lindsay James	Dem
100	Charles Isenhart	Dem	Charles Isenhart	Dem

== Notes ==
Partisan clients

== See also ==
- 2020 Iowa elections
- List of members of the 89th session of the Iowa House of Representatives
