= List of members of the 89th session of the Iowa House of Representatives =

Iowa House districts, 2012-2022.

The Iowa House of Representatives is the lower house of the Iowa General Assembly, the legislature of the U.S. state of Iowa. One State Representative is elected from each of the state's 100 electoral districts, with each House district making up half of a Senate district. The 2021-23 term is part of the 89th General Assembly. As of January 11, 2021, 59 of the seats are held by Republicans and 41 by Democrats. The presiding officer is the Speaker of the House, who is chosen by the majority party and elected by the House. In addition, representatives elect a Speaker Pro Tempore, chosen in the same manner as the Speaker, and the respective party caucuses elect a majority and minority leader, a majority and minority whip, and assistant party leaders.

Representatives serve for two-year terms and are elected in the general election on election day, as part of the presidential and midterm elections. Newly elected representatives are sworn in and begin work on the second Monday of January. Should a representative resign from office before his or her term expires, the governor calls a special election to replace the representative. Representatives are not term-limited.

Representatives generally serve on several standing committees and often serve on joint appropriations subcommittees, permanent statutory committees, and various boards and commissions.

== Party composition ==
Party composition as of October 13, 2021.
| Affiliation | Members |
|---|---|
| Republican | 60 |
| Democratic | 40 |
| Total | 100 |

== Leadership ==
House leadership as of January 11, 2021.
| Position | Name | Party | District |
|---|---|---|---|
| Speaker of the House | Pat Grassley | Republican | 50 |
| Speaker pro tempore | John Wills | Republican | 1 |
| Majority Leader | Matt Windschitl | Republican | 17 |
| Minority Leader | Jennifer Konfrst | Democratic | 43 |

== State representatives ==
| District | Jurisdiction(s) represented | Image | Representative | Party | First elected | Standing Committee Leader | Appropriations Subcommittee Member |
|---|---|---|---|---|---|---|---|
| 1 | Dickinson, Lyon, and Osceola | | John Wills | Republican | 2014 | | |
| 2 | Clay, Dickinson, and Palo Alto | Official Portrait for the 85th General Assembly | Megan Jones | Republican | 2012 | | |
| 3 | Cherokee, O'Brien, Plymouth, and Sioux | | Dennis Bush | Republican | 2020 | N/A | Agriculture and Natural Resources (Vice Chair) |
| 4 | Sioux | | Skyler Wheeler | Republican | 2016 | Education (Vice Chair) | |
| 5 | Plymouth and Woodbury | | Thomas Jeneary | Republican | 2018 | Natural Resources (Vice Chair) | |
| 6 | Woodbury | | Jacob Bossman | Republican | 2018 | N/A | Transportation, Infrastructure, and Capitals (Chair) |
| 7 | Emmet, Kossuth, and Winnebago | | Henry Stone | Republican | 2020 | Economic Growth (Vice Chair) | |
| 8 | Hancock, Kossuth, and Wright | | Terry Baxter | Republican | 2014 | | |
| 9 | Webster | | Ann Meyer | Republican | 2018 | Human Resources (Chair) | |
| 10 | Calhoun, Humboldt, Pocahontas, and Webster | | Mike Sexton | Republican | 2014 | | |
| 11 | Buena Vista and Sac | Official Portrait for the 85th General Assembly | Gary Worthan | Republican | 2006 (Note: First elected in a December 13, 2006 special election.) | N/A | Justice System (Chair) |
| 12 | Audubon, Carroll, and Crawford | | Brian Best | Republican | 2014 | Transportation (Chair) | |
| 13 | Woodbury | Official Portrait for the 85th General Assembly | Chris Hall | Democratic | 2010 | Appropriations (Ranking Member) | |
| 14 | Woodbury | | Steve Hansen | Democratic | 2020 | | |
| 15 | Pottawattamie | | Charlie McConkey | Democratic | 2014 | | |
| 16 | Pottawattamie | | Brent Siegrist | Republican | 2020 | Administration and Rules (Vice Chair); Local Government (Vice Chair) | |
| 17 | Harrison, Ida, Monona, and Woodbury | Official Portrait for the 85th General Assembly | Matt Windschitl | Republican | 2006 | | |
| 18 | Crawford, Harrison, and Shelby | | Steven Holt | Republican | 2014 | Judiciary (Chair) | |
| 19 | Dallas and Polk | | Carter Nordman | Republican | 2020 | Ways and Means (Vice Chair) | |
| 20 | Adair, Cass, Dallas, and Guthrie | | Ray Sorensen | Republican | 2018 | Economic Growth (Chair) | |
| 21 | Adams, Cass, Pottawattamie, and Union | | Tom Moore | Republican | 2015 (Note: First elected in a December 8, 2015 special election.) | Environmental Protection (Vice Chair) | |
| 22 | Pottawattamie | | Jon Jacobsen | Republican | 2017 | Government Oversight (Vice Chair) | |
| 23 | Fremont, Mills, and Montgomery | | David Sieck | Republican | 2015 (Note: First elected in a February 10, 2015 special election.) | Information Technology (Vice Chair) | |
| 24 | Montgomery, Page, Ringgold, and Taylor | Official Portrait for the 85th General Assembly | Cecil Dolecheck | Republican | 1996 | Administration and Rules (Chair) | |
| 25 | Madison and Warren | | Stan Gustafson | Republican | 2014 (Note: First elected in a January 7, 2014 special election.) | Ethics (Vice Chair); Judiciary (Vice Chair) | |
| 26 | Warren | | Brooke Boden | Republican | 2020 | State Government (Vice Chair) | |
| 27 | Clarke, Decatur, Lucas, and Wayne | Official Portrait for the 85th General Assembly | Joel Fry | Republican | 2010 | N/A | Health and Human Services (Chair) |
| 28 | Jasper, Lucas, and Marion | | Jon Thorup | Republican | 2018 | | |
| 29 | Jasper | | Jon Dunwell | Republican | 2021 (Note: First elected in an October 12, 2021 special election.) | | |
| 30 | Polk | | Brian Lohse | Republican | 2018 | Information Technology (Chair) | |
| 31 | Polk | Official Portrait for the 85th General Assembly | Rick Olson | Democratic | 2004 | | |
| 32 | Polk | Official Portrait for the 85th General Assembly | Ruth Ann Gaines | Democratic | 2010 | Government Oversight (Ranking Member) | |
| 33 | Polk | | Brian Meyer | Democratic | 2013 | | |
| 34 | Polk | Official Portrait for the 85th General Assembly | Bruce Hunter | Democratic | 2003 (Note: First elected in a February 11, 2003 special election.) | Labor (Ranking Member) | |
| 35 | Polk | Official Portrait for the 85th General Assembly | Ako Abdul-Samad | Democratic | 2006 | | |
| 36 | Polk | Official Portrait for the 85th General Assembly | Marti Anderson | Democratic | 2012 | N/A | Justice System (Ranking Member) |
| 37 | Polk | | Mike Bousselot | Republican | 2021 (Note: First elected in a September 14, 2021 special election.) | N/A | |
| 38 | Polk | | Garrett Gobble | Republican | 2020 | N/A | Education (Vice Chair) |
| 39 | Polk | | Eddie Andrews | Republican | 2020 | N/A | Health and Human Services (Vice Chair) |
| 40 | Polk | Official Portrait for the 85th General Assembly | John Forbes | Democratic | 2012 | N/A | Health and Human Services (Ranking Member) |
| 41 | Polk | Official Portrait for the 85th General Assembly | Jo Oldson | Democratic | 2002 | Commerce (Ranking Member) | |
| 42 | Polk and Warren | | Kristin Sunde | Democratic | 2018 | N/A | Administration and Regulation (Ranking Member) |
| 43 | Polk | | Jennifer Konfrst | Democratic | 2018 | | |
| 44 | Dallas | | Kenan Judge | Democratic | 2018 | Agriculture (Ranking Member) | |
| 45 | Story | Official Portrait for the 85th General Assembly | Beth Wessel-Kroeschell | Democratic | 2004 | Human Resources (Ranking Member) | |
| 46 | Story | | Ross Wilburn | Democratic | 2020 | Veterans Affairs (Ranking Member) | |
| 47 | Boone and Greene | | Phil Thompson | Republican | 2018 | N/A | Economic Development (Chair) |
| 48 | Boone, Hamilton, Story, and Webster | Official Portrait for the 85th General Assembly | Robert Bacon | Republican | 2012 | Natural Resources (Chair) | |
| 49 | Hardin and Story | Official Portrait for the 85th General Assembly | Dave Deyoe | Republican | 2006 | Labor (Chair) | |
| 50 | Butler, Grundy, and Hardin | Official Portrait for the 85th General Assembly | Pat Grassley | Republican | 2006 | | |
| 51 | Howard, Mitchell, Winneshiek, and Worth | | Jane Bloomingdale | Republican | 2016 | Local Government (Chair) | |
| 52 | Cerro Gordo, Chickasaw, and Floyd | | Todd Prichard | Democratic | 2013 (Note: Brian Quirk was elected to this seat, but resigned before term start - Todd Prichard was sworn in on January 29, 2013 to succeed Quirk.) | | |
| 53 | Cerro Gordo | Official Portrait for the 85th General Assembly | Sharon Steckman | Democratic | 2008 | N/A | Agriculture and Natural Resources (Ranking Member) |
| 54 | Butler, Cerro Gordo, and Franklin | | Shannon Latham | Republican | 2020 | Appropriations (Vice Chair) | |
| 55 | Clayton, Fayette, and Winneshiek | | Michael Bergan | Republican | 2016 | N/A | Administration and Regulation (Vice Chair) |
| 56 | Allamakee and Clayton | | Anne Osmundson | Republican | 2018 | Ethics (Chair) | Transportation, Infrastructure, and Capitals (Vice Chair) |
| 57 | Dubuque | | Shannon Lundgren | Republican | 2016 | Commerce (Chair) | |
| 58 | Dubuque, Jackson, and Jones | | Steve Bradley | Republican | 2020 | Human Resources (Vice Chair) | |
| 59 | Black Hawk | Official Portrait for the 85th General Assembly | Bob Kressig | Democratic | 2004 | Transportation (Ranking Member) | |
| 60 | Black Hawk | | Dave Williams | Democratic | 2018 | Information Technology (Ranking Member) | |
| 61 | Black Hawk | | Timi Brown-Powers | Democratic | 2014 | Natural Resources (Ranking Member) | |
| 62 | Black Hawk | | Ras Smith | Democratic | 2016 | Education (Ranking Member) | |
| 63 | Black Hawk and Bremer | Official Portrait for the 85th General Assembly | Sandy Salmon | Republican | 2012 | Veterans Affairs (Chair) | |
| 64 | Buchanan and Fayette | | Chad Ingels | Republican | 2020 | Agriculture (Vice Chair) | |
| 65 | Linn | | Liz Bennett | Democratic | 2014 | Economic Growth (Ranking Member) | |
| 66 | Linn | Official Portrait for the 85th General Assembly | Art Staed | Democratic | 2006; 2012 (Note: First elected in 2006, lost re-election to the House in 2008, elected to the House in 2012.) | Environmental Protection (Ranking Member) | |
| 67 | Linn | | Eric Gjerde | Democratic | 2020 | | |
| 68 | Linn | | Molly Donahue | Democratic | 2018 | | |
| 69 | Linn | Official Portrait for the 85th General Assembly | Kirsten Running-Marquardt | Democratic | 2009 (Note: First elected in a November 24, 2009 special election.) | N/A | Economic Development (Ranking Member) |
| 70 | Linn | | Tracy Ehlert | Democratic | 2018 | | |
| 71 | Marshall | | Sue Cahill | Democratic | 2020 | | |
| 72 | Black Hawk, Marshall, and Tama | Official Portrait for the 85th General Assembly | Dean Fisher | Republican | 2012 | Environmental Protection (Chair) | |
| 73 | Cedar, Johnson, and Muscatine | Official Portrait for the 85th General Assembly | Bobby Kaufmann | Republican | 2012 | State Government (Chair) | |
| 74 | Johnson | Official Portrait for the 85th General Assembly | David Jacoby | Democratic | 2003 (Note: First elected in an August 26, 2003 special election.) | Ways and Means (Ranking Member) | |
| 75 | Benton and Iowa | | Thomas Gerhold | Republican | 2018 | N/A | Economic Development (Vice Chair) |
| 76 | Iowa, Johnson, and Poweshiek | Official Portrait for the 85th General Assembly | David Maxwell | Republican | 2012 | Transportation (Vice Chair) | |
| 77 | Johnson | | Amy Nielsen | Democratic | 2016 | Local Government (Ranking Member) | |
| 78 | Keokuk and Washington | Official Portrait for the 85th General Assembly | Jarad Klein | Republican | 2010 | Public Safety (Chair) | |
| 79 | Mahaska and Marion | | Dustin Hite | Republican | 2018 | Education (Chair) | |
| 80 | Appanoose, Mahaska, Monroe, and Wapello | | Holly Brink | Republican | 2018 | Government Oversight (Chair) | |
| 81 | Wapello | | Cherielynn Westrich | Republican | 2020 | Public Safety (Vice Chair) | |
| 82 | Davis, Jefferson, Van Buren | | Jeff Shipley | Republican | 2018 | Labor (Vice Chair) | |
| 83 | Lee | | Martin Graber | Republican | 2020 | Veterans Affairs (Vice Chair) | |
| 84 | Henry, Jefferson, Lee, and Washington | | Joe Mitchell | Republican | 2018 | | |
| 85 | Johnson | | Christina Bohannan | Democratic | 2020 | | |
| 86 | Johnson | Official Portrait for the 85th General Assembly | Mary Mascher | Democratic | 1994 | State Government (Ranking Member) | |
| 87 | Des Moines | Official Portrait for the 85th General Assembly | Dennis Cohoon | Democratic | 1986 | N/A | Transportation, Infrastructure, and Capitals (Ranking Member) |
| 88 | Des Moines, Louisa, and Muscatine | | David Kerr | Republican | 2016 | N/A | Education (Chair) |
| 89 | Scott | | Monica Kurth | Democratic | 2017 | Ethics (Ranking Member) | |
| 90 | Scott | Official Portrait for the 85th General Assembly | Cindy Winckler | Democratic | 2000 | N/A | Education (Ranking Member) |
| 91 | Muscatine | | Mark Cisneros | Republican | 2020 | Commerce (Vice Chair) | |
| 92 | Scott | | Ross Paustian | Republican | 2014 | Agriculture (Chair) | |
| 93 | Scott | Official Portrait for the 85th General Assembly | Phyllis Thede | Democratic | 2008 | Administration and Rules (Ranking Member) | |
| 94 | Scott | | Gary Mohr | Republican | 2016 | Appropriations (Chair) | |
| 95 | Buchanan and Linn | | Charlie McClintock | Republican | 2020 | N/A | Justice System (Vice Chair) |
| 96 | Delaware and Jones | Official Portrait for the 85th General Assembly | Lee Hein | Republican | 2010 | Ways and Means (Chair) | |
| 97 | Clinton and Scott | | Norlin Mommsen | Republican | 2014 | N/A | Agriculture and Natural Resources (Chair) |
| 98 | Clinton | Official Portrait for the 85th General Assembly | Mary Wolfe | Democratic | 2010 | Judiciary (Ranking Member) | |
| 99 | Dubuque | Official Portrait for the 88th General Assembly | Lindsay James | Democratic | 2018 | | |
| 100 | Dubuque | Official Portrait for the 85th General Assembly | Charles Isenhart | Democratic | 2008 | | |

== See also ==
- List of current members of the Iowa Senate
- Iowa House of Representatives
