= 2016 Iowa House of Representatives election =

- November 8, 2016

All 100 seats in the Iowa House of Representatives 51 seats needed for a majority
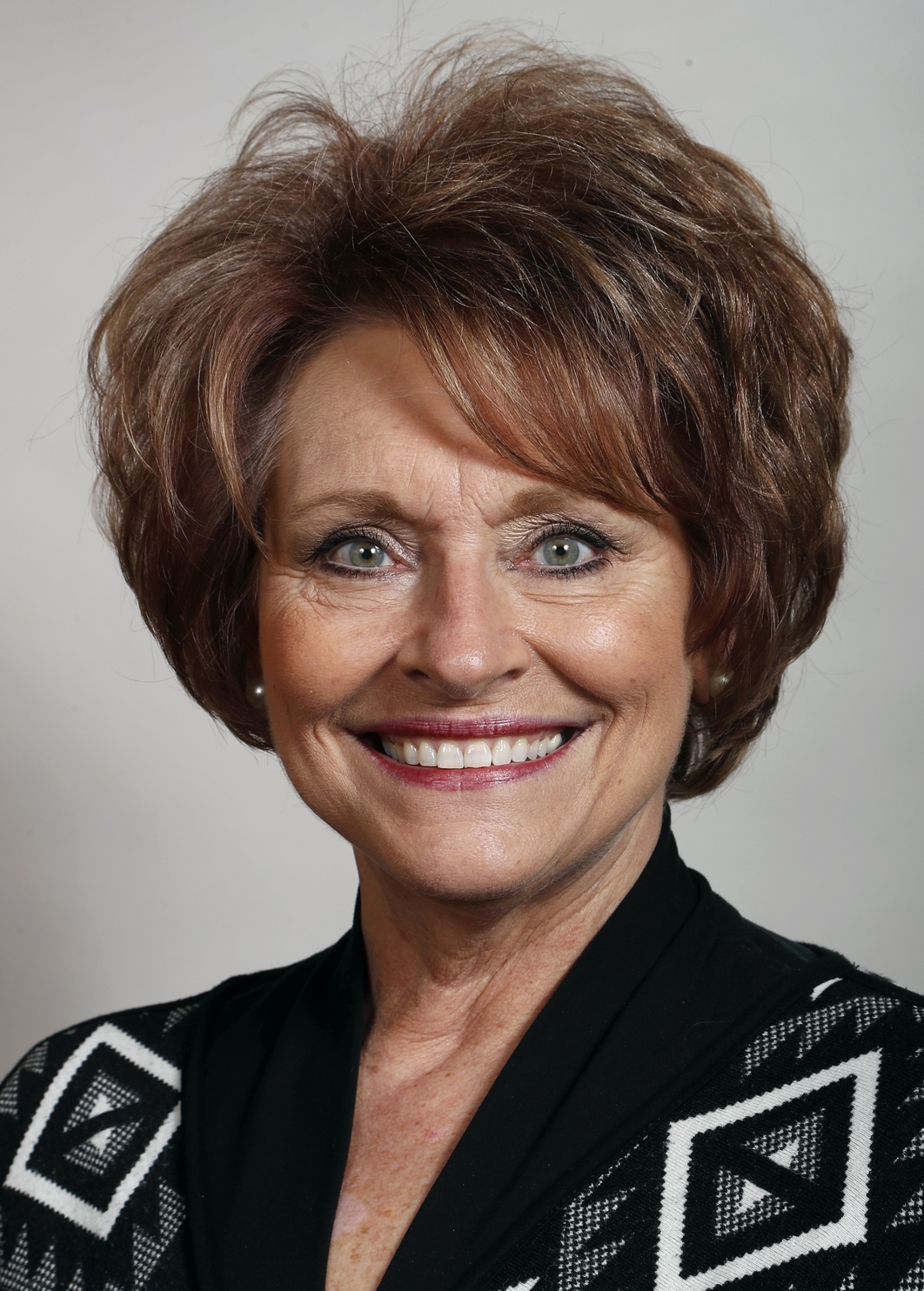

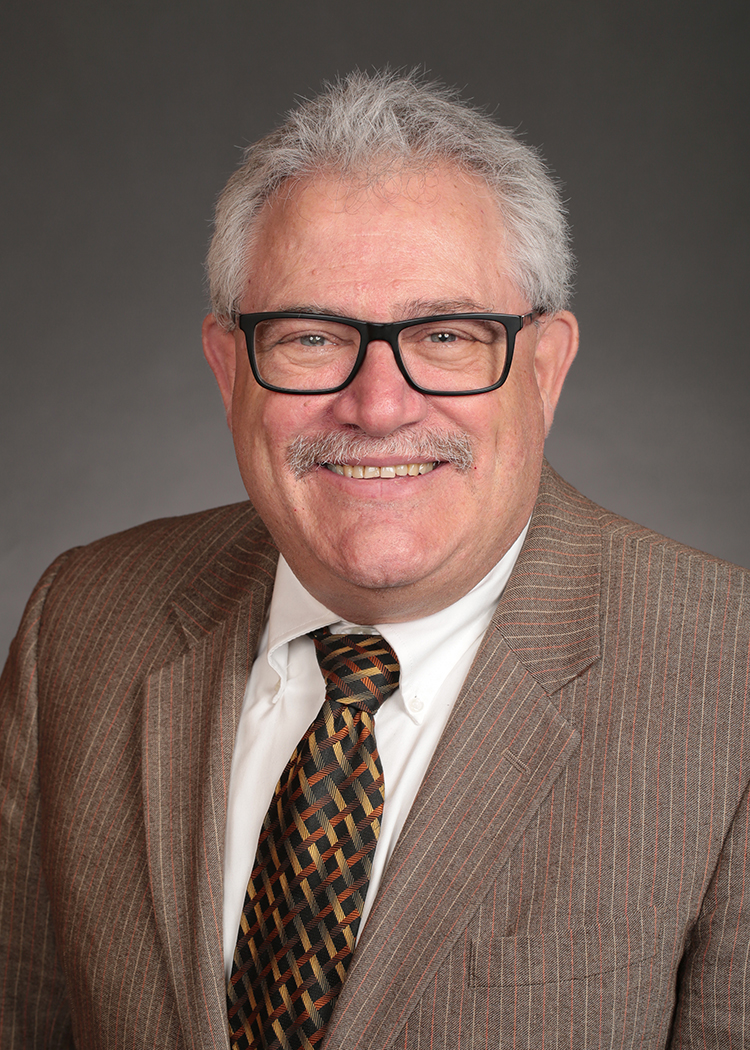
	Majority party	Minority party
Leader	Linda Upmeyer	Mark Smith
Party	Republican	Democratic
Leader since	January 14, 2016	August 10, 2013
Leader's seat	54th district	71st district
Last election	57	43
Seats won	59	41
Seat change	▲2	▼2
- Republican gain Democratic gain Republican hold Democratic hold
Speaker of the House before election
Linda Upmeyer
Republican
Elected Speaker of the House
Linda Upmeyer
Republican

The 2016 Iowa House of Representatives elections were held on November 8, 2016. All 100 seats of the Iowa House were up for election. The Republican Party retained its majority and picked up seats in the suburbs north of Dubuque and the towns east of Decorah. Members elected served in the 87th General Assembly.

== Overview ==
Party composition
Party	Seats	Change
Republican	59	▲2
Democrat	41	▼2
Total	100	

== Predictions ==
Source	Ranking	As of
Governing	Likely R	October 12, 2016

== General election ==
The election results for each of the districts were organized in the following table:

District	Party	Incumbent	Status	Party	Candidate	Votes	%
1	Republican	John Wills	Re-elected	Republican	John Wills	14,627	82.74
2	Republican	Megan Hess	Re-elected	Republican	Megan Hess	12,756	80.09
3	Republican	Dan Huseman	Re-elected	Republican	Dan Huseman	12,096	76.10
3	Republican	Dan Huseman	Re-elected	Democratic	Mason McCoy	2,848	17.92
4	Republican	Dwayne Alons	Deceased	Republican	Skyler Wheeler	9,815	58.85
4	Republican	Dwayne Alons	Deceased	Independent	Jeff VanDerWerff	5,838	35.01
5	Republican	Chuck Soderberg	Did not run	Republican	Chuck Holz	11,774	73.02
5	Republican	Chuck Soderberg	Did not run	Democratic	Patrick Ritz	3,445	21.36
6	Republican	Ron Jorgensen	Did not run	Republican	Jim Carlin	9,655	61.66
6	Republican	Ron Jorgensen	Did not run	Democratic	Perla Alarcon-Flory	5,086	32.48
7	Republican	Tedd Gassman	Re-elected	Republican	Tedd Gassman	9,665	60.96
7	Republican	Tedd Gassman	Re-elected	Democratic	Dave Grussing	5,608	35.37
8	Republican	Terry Baxter	Re-elected	Republican	Terry Baxter	10,078	64.66
8	Republican	Terry Baxter	Re-elected	Democratic	Nancy Huisinga	4,701	30.16
9	Democratic	Helen Miller	Re-elected	Democratic	Helen Miller	7,461	54.87
9	Democratic	Helen Miller	Re-elected	Republican	Gary Waechter	5,562	40.90
10	Republican	Mike Sexton	Re-elected	Republican	Mike Sexton	13,063	81.07
11	Republican	Gary Worthan	Re-elected	Republican	Gary Worthan	8,279	60.71
11	Republican	Gary Worthan	Re-elected	Democratic	Sara Huddleston	4,475	32.81
12	Republican	Brian Best	Re-elected	Republican	Brian Best	10,349	64.70
12	Republican	Brian Best	Re-elected	Democratic	Ken Myers	4,369	27.31
13	Democratic	Chris Hall	Re-elected	Democratic	Chris Hall	7,027	59.24
13	Democratic	Chris Hall	Re-elected	Republican	Shaun Broyhill	4,365	36.80
14	Democratic	David Dawson	Did not run	Democratic	Tim Kacena	5,365	48.28
14	Democratic	David Dawson	Did not run	Republican	Robert Henderson	5,126	46.13
15	Democratic	Charlie McConkey	Re-elected	Democratic	Charlie McConkey	5,424	48.43
15	Democratic	Charlie McConkey	Re-elected	Republican	Bill Riley	5,056	45.15
16	Republican	Mary Ann Hanusa	Re-elected	Republican	Mary Ann Hanusa	6,847	54.02
16	Republican	Mary Ann Hanusa	Re-elected	Democratic	Steve Gorman	5,120	40.40
17	Republican	Matt Windschitl	Re-elected	Republican	Matt Windschitl	10,712	69.20
17	Republican	Matt Windschitl	Re-elected	Democratic	Jan Creasman	3,866	24.94
18	Republican	Steven Holt	Re-elected	Republican	Steven Holt	10,603	74.53
19	Republican	Ralph Watts	Re-elected	Republican	Ralph Watts	10,393	56.72
19	Republican	Ralph Watts	Re-elected	Democratic	Bryce Smith	6,597	36.00
20	Republican	Clel Baudler	Re-elected	Republican	Clel Baudler	7,204	50.50
20	Republican	Clel Baudler	Re-elected	Democratic	Scott Heldt	4,006	28.08
20	Republican	Clel Baudler	Re-elected	Libertarian	Bob Boyle	1,498	10,50
20	Republican	Clel Baudler	Re-elected	Independent	Ryan Ketelsen	985	6.90
21	Republican	Jack Drake	Deceased	Republican	Tom Moore	11,716	76.95
22	Republican	Greg Forristall	Re-elected	Republican	Greg Forristall	14,015	18,182
23	Republican	Mark Costello	Ran for Iowa Senate	Republican	David Sieck	10,068	66.74
23	Republican	Mark Costello	Ran for Iowa Senate	Democratic	Craig Florian	4,061	26.92
24	Republican	Cecil Dolecheck	Re-elected	Republican	Cecil Dolecheck	11,702	81.49
25	Republican	Stan Gustafson	Re-elected	Republican	Stan Gustafson	11,280	61.74
25	Republican	Stan Gustafson	Re-elected	Democratic	Justin Knight	5,850	32.02
26	Democratic	Scott Ourth	Re-elected	Democratic	Scott Ourth	9,122	51.95
26	Democratic	Scott Ourth	Re-elected	Republican	Rebel Snodgrass	7,769	44.25
27	Republican	Joel Fry	Re-elected	Republican	Joel Fry	9,478	66.87
27	Republican	Joel Fry	Re-elected	Democratic	Rich Higdon	3,885	27.41
28	Republican	Greg Heartsill	Re-elected	Republican	Greg Heartsill	9,593	62.30
28	Republican	Greg Heartsill	Re-elected	Democratic	Martin Duffy	5,230	33.97
29	Democratic	Dan Kelley	Lost in primary	Democratic	Wes Breckenridge	7,903	49.51
29	Democratic	Dan Kelley	Lost in primary	Republican	Patrick Payton	5,831	36.53
29	Democratic	Dan Kelley	Lost in primary	Other	Dan Kelley	1,758	11.01
30	Republican	Zach Nunn	Re-elected	Republican	Zach Nunn	11,442	59.82
30	Republican	Zach Nunn	Re-elected	Democratic	Joe Riding	6,999	36.59
31	Democratic	Rick Olson	Re-elected	Democratic	Rick Olson	7,160	51.63
31	Democratic	Rick Olson	Re-elected	Republican	Matt Christoffersen	5,027	36.25
31	Democratic	Rick Olson	Re-elected	Libertarian	Joe Gleason	794	5.72
32	Democratic	Ruth Ann Gaines	Re-elected	Democratic	Ruth Ann Gaines	7,142	63.90
32	Democratic	Ruth Ann Gaines	Re-elected	Republican	Bill Charlier	2,920	26.13
32	Democratic	Ruth Ann Gaines	Re-elected	Libertarian	Seth Bartmess	466	4.17
33	Democratic	Brian Meyer	Re-elected	Democratic	Brian Meyer	7,785	62.13
33	Democratic	Brian Meyer	Re-elected	Libertarian	Jeremy Tomlinson	2,373	18.94
34	Democratic	Bruce Hunter	Re-elected	Democratic	Bruce Hunter	9,677	70.58
35	Democratic	Ako Abdul-Samad	Re-elected	Democratic	Ako Abdul-Samad	6,458	64.72
35	Democratic	Ako Abdul-Samad	Re-elected	Libertarian	Jocelyn Fry	2,057	20.61
36	Democratic	Marti Anderson	Re-elected	Democratic	Marti Anderson	10,348	59.66
36	Democratic	Marti Anderson	Re-elected	Republican	Scott Miller	5,853	33.74
37	Republican	John Landon	Re-elected	Republican	John Landon	12,059	53.73
37	Republican	John Landon	Re-elected	Democratic	Andrea Phillips	8,954	39.89
38	Republican	Kevin Koester	Re-elected	Republican	Kevin Koester	8,793	49.74
38	Republican	Kevin Koester	Re-elected	Democratic	Heather Matson	7,264	41.09
38	Republican	Kevin Koester	Re-elected	Libertarian	Jeffrey Meyers	610	3.45
38	Republican	Kevin Koester	Re-elected	Independent	Brett Nelson	183	1.04
39	Republican	Jake Highfill	Re-elected	Republican	Jake Highfill	11,492	53.49
39	Republican	Jake Highfill	Re-elected	Democratic	Maridith Morris	8,549	39.79
40	Democratic	John Forbes	Re-elected	Democratic	John Forbes	9,660	53.91
40	Democratic	John Forbes	Re-elected	Republican	Scott Reed	7,332	40.92
41	Democratic	Jo Oldson	Re-elected	Democratic	Jo Oldson	13,363	74.85
42	Republican	Peter Cownie	Re-elected	Republican	Peter Cownie	9,065	51.16
42	Republican	Peter Cownie	Re-elected	Democratic	Claire Celsi	7,948	44.85
43	Republican	Chris Hagenow	Re-elected	Republican	Chris Hagenow	8,809	49.41
43	Republican	Chris Hagenow	Re-elected	Democratic	Jennifer Konfrst	8,273	46.41
44	Republican	Rob Taylor	Re-elected	Republican	Rob Taylor	13,818	69.91
45	Democratic	Beth Wessel-Kroeschell	Re-elected	Democratic	Beth Wessel-Kroeschell	9,036	52.57
45	Democratic	Beth Wessel-Kroeschell	Re-elected	Republican	Sondra Childs-Smith	5,730	33.34
45	Democratic	Beth Wessel-Kroeschell	Re-elected	Libertarian	Eric Cooper	1,277	7.43
46	Democratic	Lisa Heddens	Re-elected	Democratic	Lisa Heddens	11,927	69.23
47	Republican	Ralph Watts	Re-elected	Republican	Chip Baltimore	9,165	57.15
47	Republican	Ralph Watts	Re-elected	Democratic	Deb Duncan	5,983	37.31
48	Republican	Robert Bacon	Re-elected	Republican	Robert Bacon	9,829	59.36
48	Republican	Robert Bacon	Re-elected	Democratic	Sherrie Taha	5,397	32.59
49	Republican	Dave Deyoe	Re-elected	Republican	Dave Deyoe	9,315	56.21
49	Republican	Dave Deyoe	Re-elected	Democratic	Mickie Franklin	4,382	26.44
49	Republican	Dave Deyoe	Re-elected	Libertarian	John Evans	1,126	6.79
49	Republican	Dave Deyoe	Re-elected	Independent	Mike Knox	741	4.47
50	Republican	Pat Grassley	Re-elected	Republican	Pat Grassley	11,493	72.22
50	Republican	Pat Grassley	Re-elected	Democratic	Doris Fritz	3,901	24.51
51	Republican	Josh Byrnes	Did not run	Republican	Jane Bloomingdale	9,408	59.69
51	Republican	Josh Byrnes	Did not run	Democratic	Tim Hejhal	5,647	35.83
52	Democratic	Todd Prichard	Re-elected	Democratic	Todd Prichard	8,160	51.85
52	Democratic	Todd Prichard	Re-elected	Republican	Stacie Stokes	6,847	43.50
53	Democratic	Sharon Steckman	Re-elected	Democratic	Sharon Steckman	8,977	58.94
53	Democratic	Sharon Steckman	Re-elected	Republican	Barbara Hovland	5,869	38.53
54	Republican	Linda Upmeyer	Re-elected	Republican	Linda Upmeyer	12,675	80.93
55	Republican	Darrel Branhagen	Did not run	Republican	Michael Bergan	8,943	54.78
55	Republican	Darrel Branhagen	Did not run	Democratic	Patt Ritter	6,697	41.03
56	Democratic	Patti Ruff	Lost re-election	Republican	Kristi Hager	7,910	53.04
56	Democratic	Patti Ruff	Lost re-election	Democratic	Patti Ruff	6,605	44.29
57	Democratic	Nancy Dunkel	Did not run	Republican	Shannon Lundgren	9,023	49.67
57	Democratic	Nancy Dunkel	Did not run	Democratic	Tom Stecher	8,249	45.41
58	Republican	Brian Moore	Did not run	Republican	Andy McKean	9,048	55.70
58	Republican	Brian Moore	Did not run	Democratic	Jessica Kean	6,296	38.76
59	Democratic	Bob Kressig	Re-elected	Democratic	Bob Kressig	8,567	51.64
59	Democratic	Bob Kressig	Re-elected	Republican	Drew Speer	4,891	29.48
59	Democratic	Bob Kressig	Re-elected	Independent	Nick Taiber	2,319	13.98
60	Republican	Walt Rogers	Re-elected	Republican	Walt Rogers	10,115	56.24
60	Republican	Walt Rogers	Re-elected	Democratic	Gary Kroeger	7,267	40.40
61	Democratic	Timi Brown-Powers	Re-elected	Democratic	Timi Brown-Powers	9,206	69.94
62	Democratic	Deborah Berry	Did not run	Democratic	Ras Smith	7,113	59.02
62	Democratic	Deborah Berry	Did not run	Republican	Todd Obadal	3,354	27.83
62	Democratic	Deborah Berry	Did not run	Independent	John Patterson	797	6.61
63	Republican	Sandy Salmon	Re-elected	Republican	Sandy Salmon	9,927	57.13
63	Republican	Sandy Salmon	Re-elected	Democratic	Teresa Meyer	6,644	38.45
64	Democratic	Bruce Bearinger	Re-elected	Democratic	Bruce Bearinger	8,288	56.10
64	Democratic	Bruce Bearinger	Re-elected	Republican	Zach Schulz	5,912	40.02
65	Democratic	Liz Bennett	Re-elected	Democratic	Liz Bennett	9,724	62.19
65	Democratic	Liz Bennett	Re-elected	Republican	Harry Foster	4,881	31.21
66	Democratic	Art Staed	Re-elected	Democratic	Art Staed	11,669	69.09
67	Republican	Kraig Paulsen	Did not run	Republican	Ashley Hinson	11,248	60.63
67	Republican	Kraig Paulsen	Did not run	Democratic	Mark Seidl	6,749	36.38
68	Republican	Ken Rizer	Re-elected	Republican	Ken Rizer	9,317	51.65
68	Republican	Ken Rizer	Re-elected	Democratic	Molly Donahue	7,921	43.91
69	Democratic	Kirsten Running-Marquardt	Re-elected	Democratic	Kirsten Running-Marquardt	10,730	69.45
70	Democratic	Todd Taylor	Re-elected	Democratic	Todd Taylor	8,877	52.82
70	Democratic	Todd Taylor	Re-elected	Republican	Steven Van Fleet	5,698	33.90
70	Democratic	Todd Taylor	Re-elected	Libertarian	Dave Cork	1,050	6.25
71	Democratic	Mark Smith	Re-elected	Democratic	Mark Smith	8,668	67.73
72	Republican	Dean Fisher	Re-elected	Republican	Dean Fisher	9,397	59.20
72	Republican	Dean Fisher	Re-elected	Democratic	Nathan Wrage	5,841	36.80
73	Republican	Bobby Kaufmann	Re-elected	Republican	Bobby Kaufmann	10,498	73.35
74	Democratic	David Jacoby	Re-elected	Democratic	David Jacoby	12,839	76.51
75	Republican	Dawn Pettengill	Re-elected	Republican	Dawn Pettengill	10,448	64.11
75	Republican	Dawn Pettengill	Re-elected	Democratic	Paula Denison	4,924	30.21
76	Republican	David Maxwell	Re-elected	Republican	David Maxwell	9,754	58.79
76	Republican	David Maxwell	Re-elected	Democratic	Jacob Turnholm	5,907	35.60
77	Democratic	Sally Stutsman	Did not run	Democratic	Amy Nielsen	10,217	54.04
77	Democratic	Sally Stutsman	Did not run	Republican	Royce Phillips	7,461	39.47
78	Republican	Jarad Klein	Re-elected	Republican	Jarad Klein	10,138	67.17
78	Republican	Jarad Klein	Re-elected	Democratic	Joshua Miller	2,790	18.49
79	Republican	Guy Vander Linden	Re-elected	Republican	Guy Vander Linden	12,615	79.73
80	Republican	Larry Sheets	Re-elected	Republican	Larry Sheets	8,557	57.20
80	Republican	Larry Sheets	Re-elected	Democratic	Levi Grenko	5,009	33.48
80	Republican	Larry Sheets	Re-elected	Libertarian	Garrett Byrd	497	3.32
81	Democratic	Mary Gaskill	Re-elected	Democratic	Mary Gaskill	8,356	65.93
82	Democratic	Curt Hanson	Re-elected	Democratic	Curt Hanson	10,488	70.45
83	Democratic	Jerry Kearns	Re-elected	Democratic	Jerry Kearns	9,617	71.55
84	Republican	Dave Heaton	Re-elected	Republican	Dave Heaton	9,636	67.03
84	Republican	Dave Heaton	Re-elected	Democratic	Carrie Duncan	4,225	29.39
85	Democratic	Vicki Lensing	Re-elected	Democratic	Vicki Lensing	15,213	77.86
86	Democratic	Mary Mascher	Re-elected	Democratic	Mary Mascher	12,689	77.18
87	Democratic	Dennis Cohoon	Re-elected	Democratic	Dennis Cohoon	9,333	67.84
88	Republican	David Kerr	Re-elected	Republican	David Kerr	8,619	58.55
88	Republican	David Kerr	Re-elected	Democratic	Ryan Drew	5,469	37.15
89	Democratic	Jim Lykam	Re-elected	Democratic	Jim Lykam	10,549	70.46
90	Democratic	Cindy Winckler	Re-elected	Democratic	Cindy Winckler	8,442	73.42
91	Republican	Gary Carlson	Re-elected	Republican	Gary Carlson	7,293	51.93
91	Republican	Gary Carlson	Re-elected	Democratic	Phil Wiese	6,229	44.35
92	Republican	Ross Paustian	Re-elected	Republican	Ross Paustian	8,676	53.77
92	Republican	Ross Paustian	Re-elected	Democratic	Ken Krumwiede	6,782	42.03
93	Democratic	Phyllis Thede	Re-elected	Democratic	Phyllis Thede	8,470	49.81
93	Democratic	Phyllis Thede	Re-elected	Republican	Kurt Whalen	7,865	46.26
94	Republican	Linda Miller	Did not run	Republican	Gary Mohr	14,696	72.74
95	Republican	Quentin Stanerson	Did not run	Republican	Louie Zumbach	9,868	55.83
95	Republican	Quentin Stanerson	Did not run	Democratic	Richard Whitehead	7,085	40.08
96	Republican	Lee Hein	Re-elected	Republican	Lee Hein	9,276	60.98
96	Republican	Lee Hein	Re-elected	Democratic	Matt Hanlon	4,950	32.54
97	Republican	Norlin Mommsen	Re-elected	Republican	Norlin Mommsen	9,345	53.31
97	Republican	Norlin Mommsen	Re-elected	Democratic	Jeff Wolf	6,202	35.38
97	Republican	Norlin Mommsen	Re-elected	Libertarian	David Melchert Jr.	1,247	7.11
98	Democratic	Mary Wolfe	Re-elected	Democratic	Mary Wolfe	8,547	64.32
98	Democratic	Mary Wolfe	Re-elected	Republican	Jeannine Eldrenkamp	4,306	32.40
99	Democratic	Abby Finkenauer	Re-elected	Democratic	Abby Finkenauer	10,780	63.74
100	Democratic	Charles Isenhart	Re-elected	Democratic	Charles Isenhart	9,213	66.93
