= Jeff Kaufmann =

American politician (born 1963)

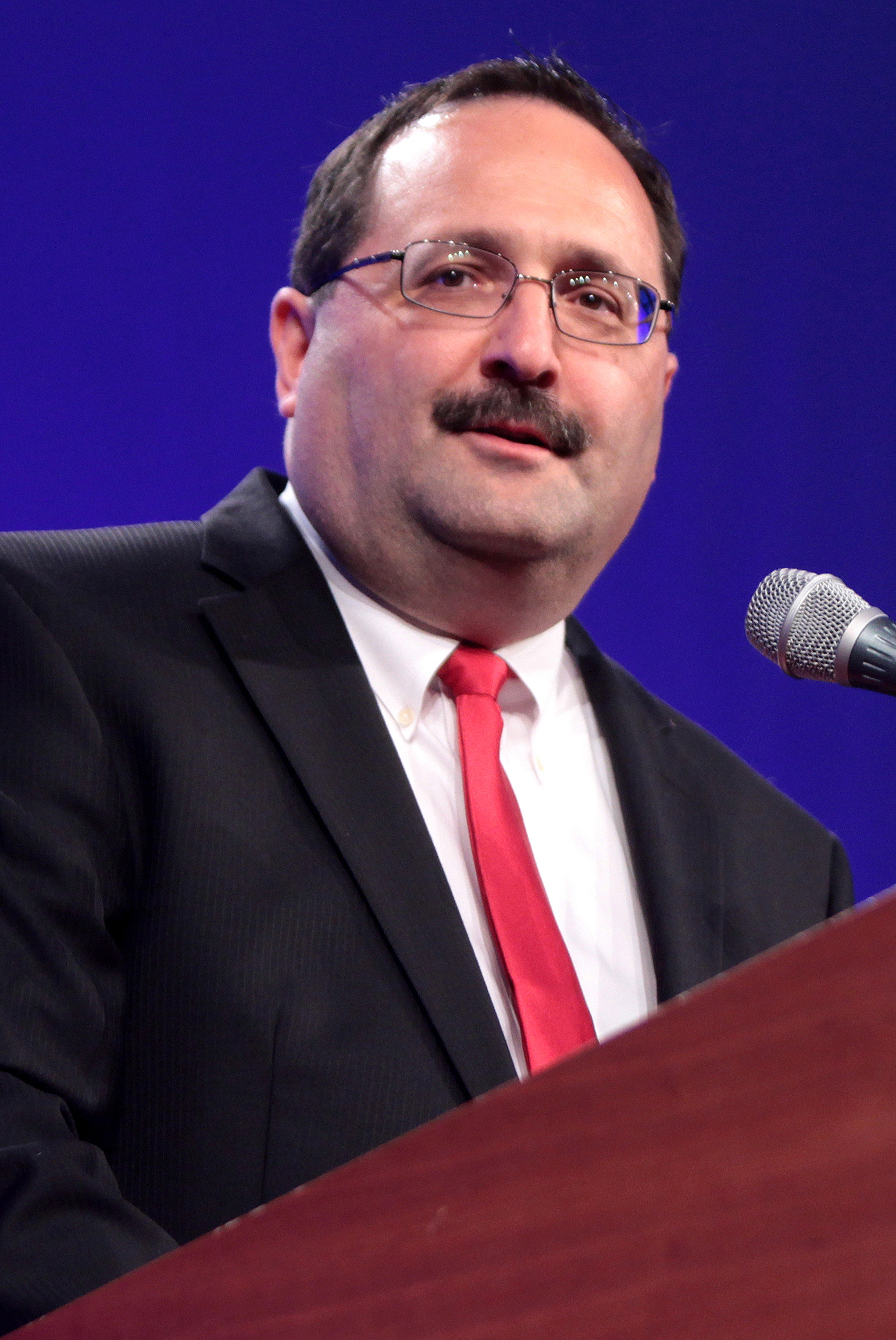
- Kaufmann in 2015

Chair of the Iowa Republican Party
- Incumbent
- Assumed office June 28, 2014
- Preceded by: Danny Carroll

Member of the Iowa House of Representatives from the 79th district
- In office January 10, 2005 – January 13, 2013
- Preceded by: Dan Boddicker
- Succeeded by: Bobby Kaufmann

Personal details
- Born: January 9, 1963 (age 63)
- Party: Republican
- Spouse: Vicki
- Children: 3, including Bobby
- Education: University of Iowa (BA, MA, PhD)

Jeff A. Kaufmann (born 9 January 1963) is a former Iowa state representative from the 79th district. He served in the Iowa House of Representatives from 2004 until his retirement in 2013. He served in House leadership for six years, serving as the assistant minority leader and speaker pro tem. He is a Republican.

== Education ==
Kauffman obtained his BA, MA, and Ph.D from the University of Iowa.

== Career ==
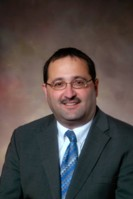
Kaufmann during his time in the Iowa House of Representatives

Outside politics, Kaufmann is a seventh generation livestock farmer, as well as a professor of history and government at Muscatine Community College, where he has taught courses since 1990.

Kaufmann won his first election to the Iowa House of Representatives by just over 1,000 votes, and was re-elected three times. In 2006, he was reelected with 6,311 votes (62%), defeating Democratic opponent Clara Oleson. In 2008, Kaufmann collected 9,456 votes, easily maintaining his seat. Democrat Rebecca Spears dropped out of the race before election day.

In the Iowa House, Kaufmann was a member of the Administration and Rules committee; the Education committee; the State Government committee; the Ways and Means committee; and the Local Government committee, where he was the ranking member. Kaufmann authored a key anti-eminent domain bill; the Legislature overrode a veto by Democratic Governor Tom Vilsack which was the only override of a Governor's veto in half a century. As a member of the House leadership team, Kaufmann played a key role in recruiting, fundraising, and campaigning for Republican candidate.

In 2014, Kaufmann became chairman of the Republican Party of Iowa. During his tenure, the party enjoyed major successes on the local, state, and federal levels. In his time as chair, the winning control of both chambers of the legislature and the governorship for the first time in almost twenty years. On the federal level, Republicans captured five of six federal offices, while delivering Iowa to the Republican presidential nominee for the first time since 2004.

His previous political experience includes serving as a trustee for Sugar Creek Township, as president of the Wilton School Board, and he currently serves as a Cedar County supervisor.

== Personal life ==
Kaufmann is married to his wife, Vicki. Together, they have three sons, including Iowa state representative Bobby Kaufmann.

Iowa House of Representatives
Preceded by Dan Boddicker	Member of the Iowa House of Representatives from the 79th district 2005–2013	Succeeded by Bobby Kaufmann
Party political offices
Preceded by Danny Carroll	Chair of the Iowa Republican Party; 2014–present	Incumbent
