= Iowa's 79th House of Representatives district =

American legislative district

House District 79
- Type: District of the Lower house
- Location: Iowa
- Representative: Tracy Ehlert
- Parent organization: Iowa General Assembly

The 79th District of the Iowa House of Representatives in the state of Iowa. It is currently composed of part of Linn County.

== Current elected officials ==
Tracy Ehlert is the representative currently representing the district.

== Past representatives ==
The district has previously been represented by:

- George J. Knoke, 1971–1973
- LaVern R. Harvey, 1973–1979
- James A. Lorenzen, 1979–1981
- Joan Smith, 1981–1983
- John Connors, 1983–1993
- Michael J. O'Brien, 1993–2003
- Dan Boddicker, 2003–2005
- Jeff Kaufmann, 2005–2013
- Guy Vander Linden, 2013–2019
- Dustin Hite, 2019–2023
- Tracy Ehlert, 2023–present
