= Dan Boddicker =

American politician (born 1962)

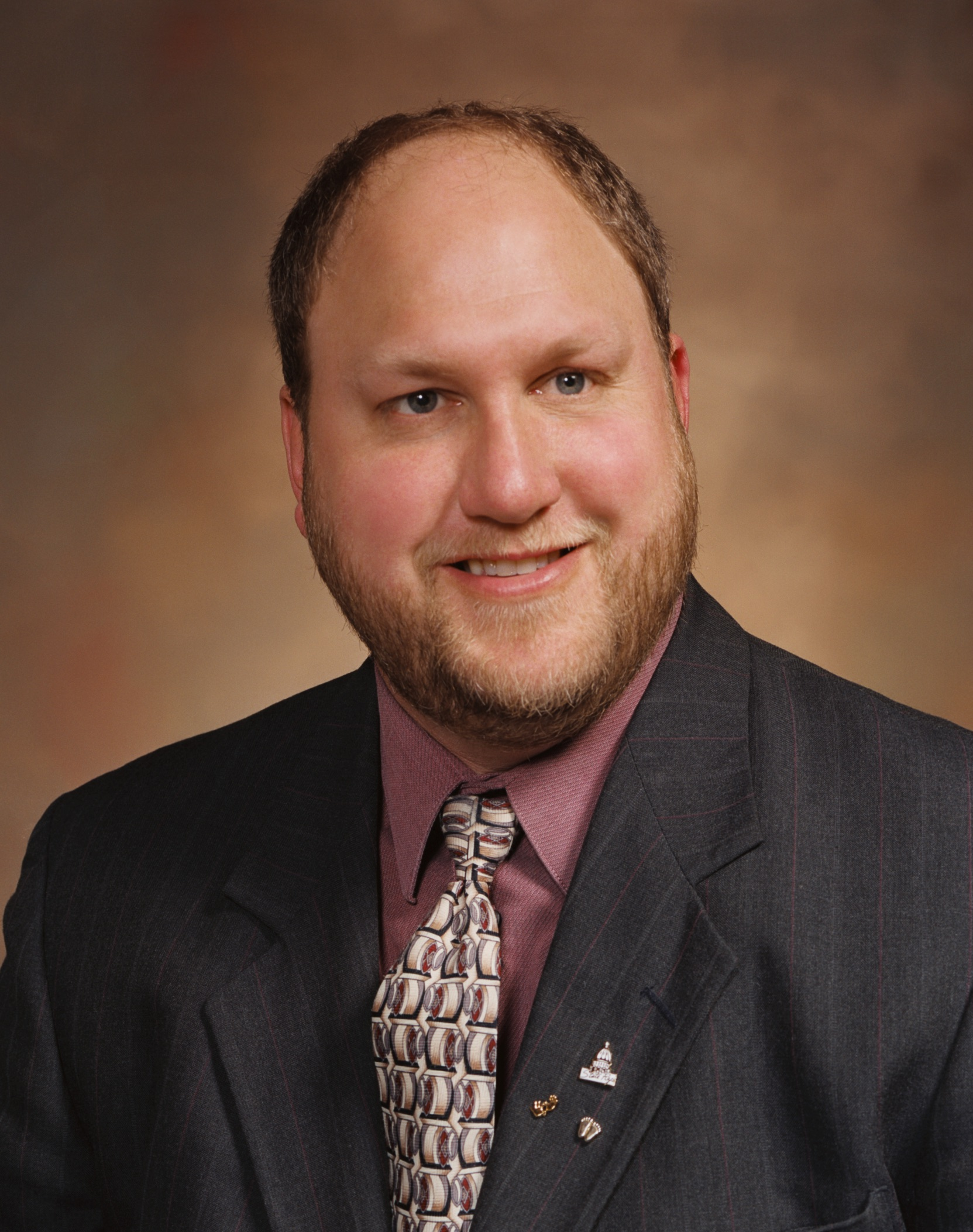

Member of the Iowa House of Representatives
- In office January 11, 1993 – January 9, 2005

Personal details
- Born: November 18, 1962 (age 63) Vinton, Iowa, United States
- Party: Republican
- Spouse: Maureen
- Children: five
- Education: Kirkwood Community College, Cedar Rapids, IA
- Occupation: Electrical Engineer, Owner Laramie Fire Extinguisher Services, LLC

Daniel J. Boddicker (born November 18, 1962) is a retired American politician in the state of Iowa.

Boddicker was born in Vinton, Iowa. He grew up on the family farm near Vinton, and following graduation from high school, performed music throughout the mid west in the rock band RATLER. He married Carla Noller in 1983 (divorced in 2009). Boddicker attended Kirkwood Community College and worked as an electrical engineer at HWH Corp. for 26 years. During that time, he also served in the Iowa House of Representatives from 1993 to 2005 (39th district from 1993 to 2003 and 79th district succeeding Michael J. O'Brien from 2003 to 2005). During his legislative career, Boddicker served as chairman of the House Human Resources Committee for eight years, and also served on the Judiciary and Law Enforcement, Labor and Industrial Relations, Education, Natural Resources, Human Services Budget Sub Committee, and Administration and Regulation Budget Sub Committee. He retired from the Iowa General Assembly in 2005. In 2011, he married Maureen Sorensson of Laramie, Wyoming, and now owns and operates Laramie Fire Extinguisher Services, LLC. in Laramie.
