= Helen Miller (politician) =

American politician (born 1945)

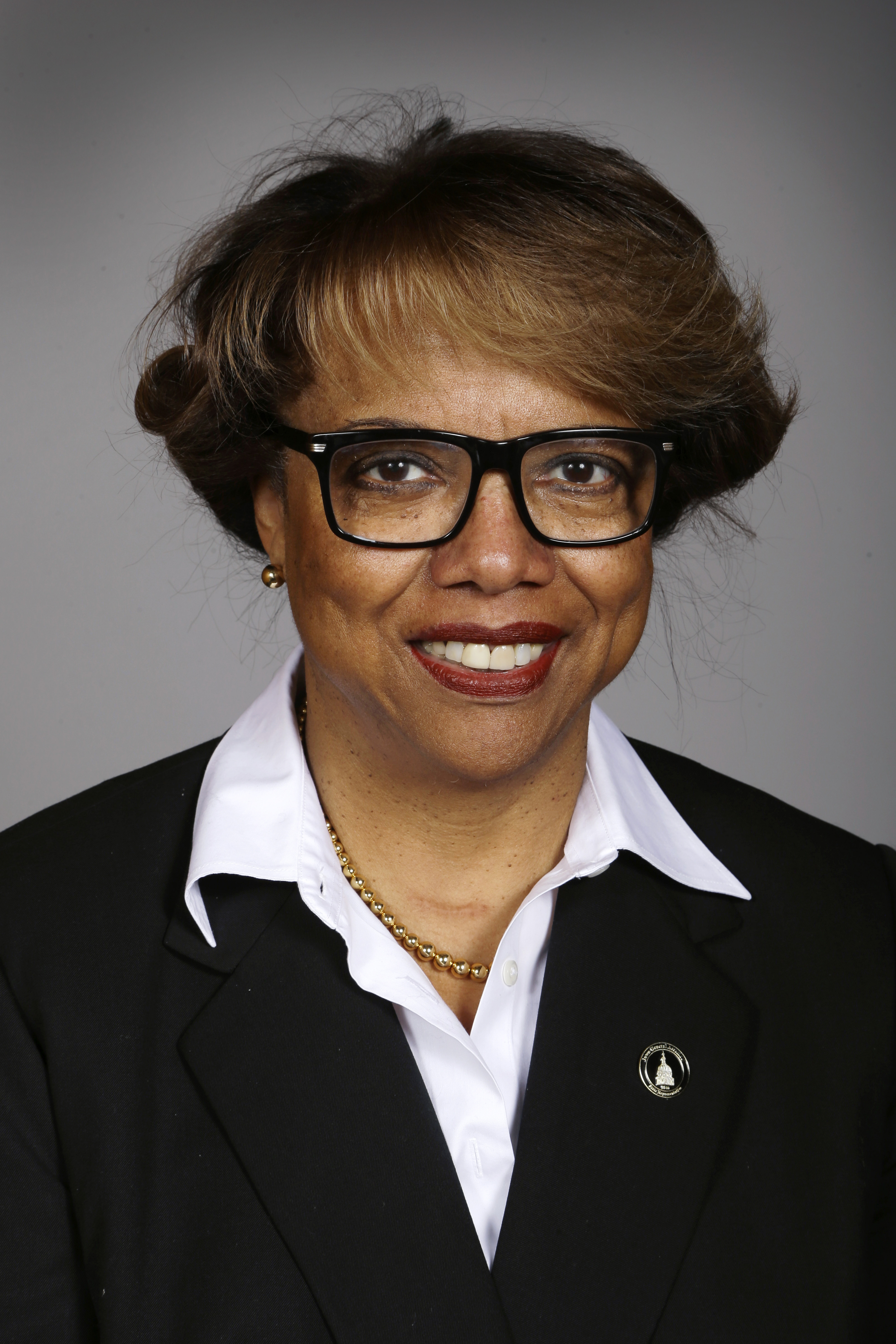

Member of the Iowa House of Representatives from the 9th district 49th (2003–2013)
- In office January 13, 2003 – January 14, 2019
- Preceded by: Mike Cormack
- Succeeded by: Ann Meyer

Personal details
- Born: 1945 (age 80–81) Newark, New Jersey, U.S.
- Party: Democratic
- Spouse: Edward
- Children: 3
- Education: Howard University (BA); Our Lady of the Lake University (MA); Georgetown University (JD)

Helen Naomi Miller (born 1945) is an American politician who served as a member of the Iowa House of Representatives from 2003 to 2019.

== Education ==
Miller was born in Newark, New Jersey, and attended South Side High School (now Malcolm X Shabazz High School). She graduated from Howard University in Washington, D.C., with a Bachelor of Arts in business administration and was initiated as a member of Delta Sigma Theta sorority. She later earned a Master of Science in library sciences from Our Lady of the Lake University in San Antonio, Texas. She earned her Juris Doctor from the Georgetown University Law Center.

== Career ==
In the Iowa House of Representatives, Miller served on several committees, including the Economic Growth, Natural Resources, and Transportation committees. She also serves as the ranking member of the Agriculture Committee. Her political experience includes serving as an assistant minority leader in the Iowa House (2005–2006) and an assistant majority leader.

Iowa House of Representatives
Preceded by Dick Myers	49th District; 2003–2013	Succeeded by Dave Deyoe
Preceded by Stewart Iverson	9th District; 2013–present	Succeeded by Incumbent
