= Dustin Hite =

American politician (born 1983)

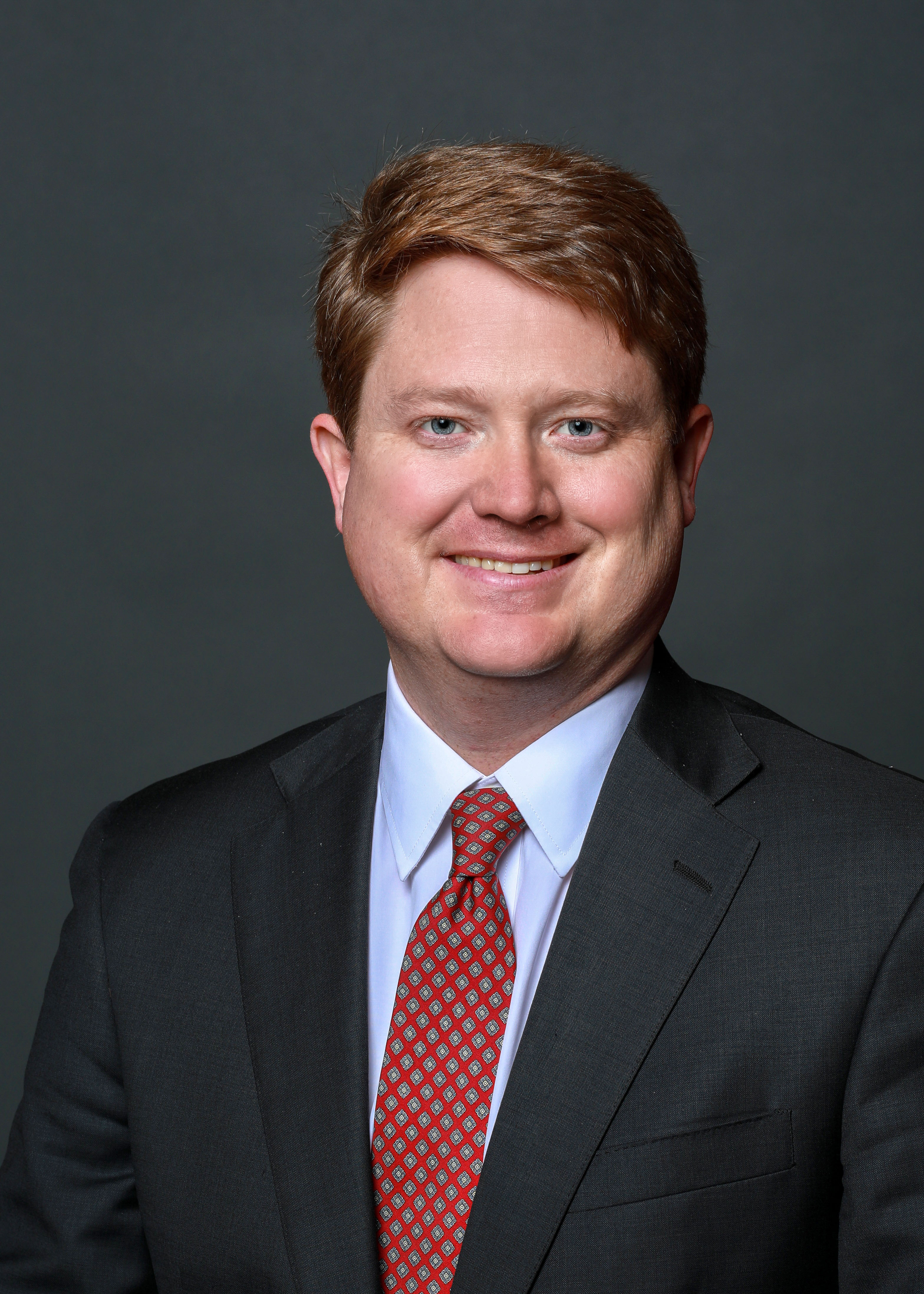

Member of the Iowa House of Representatives from the 79th district
- In office January 14, 2019 – January 9, 2023
- Preceded by: Guy Vander Linden
- Succeeded by: Tracy Ehlert (redistricting)

Personal details
- Born: Dustin Dean Hite; November 14, 1983 (age 42) Mahaska County, Iowa, U.S.
- Party: Republican
- Spouse: Kate
- Children: 2
- Education: University of Iowa (J.D.)
- Occupation: Heslinga, Dixon & Hite (Attorney)

Dustin Dean Hite (born November 14, 1983), is an American politician from the state of Iowa.

Hite was born in Mahaska County, Iowa in 1983. He resides with his family in New Sharon, Iowa.

In late 2021, Hite announced his re-election bid for the newly re-drawn Iowa House Seat 88 (changed from the previous Iowa House Seat 79). He lost that primary election to Helena Hayes.

== Electoral history ==
*incumbent

=== 2018 ===
Election	Political result	Candidate	Party	Votes	%
Iowa House general election, 2018; District 79	Republican	Dustin Hite	Republican	9,186	
Iowa House general election, 2018; District 79	Republican	Samantha Keith	Democratic	2,978	
Iowa House general election, 2018; District 79	Republican	Nicholas Ryan	Libertarian	427	

=== 2020 ===
Election	Political result	Candidate	Party	Votes	%
Iowa House primary elections, 2020; District 79	Republican	Dustin Hite	Republican	3,105	98.8
Iowa House primary elections, 2020; District 79	Republican	Write-ins	Republican	7	0.2
Iowa House general election, 2020; District 79	Republican	Dustin Hite	Republican	13,434	98.64
Iowa House general election, 2020; District 79	Republican	Write-ins	Democratic	187	1.36

=== 2022 ===
Election	Political result	Candidate	Party	Votes	%
Iowa House primary elections, 2022; District 88	Republican	Helena Hayes	Republican	1,961	57.37
Iowa House primary elections, 2022; District 88	Republican	Dustin Hite*	Republican	1,453	42.51
Iowa House primary elections, 2022; District 88	Republican	Write-ins	Republican	4	0.12

Iowa House of Representatives
Preceded by Guy Vander Linden	79th district 2019–2023	Succeeded by Tracy Ehlert
