= Iowa's 70th House of Representatives district =

American legislative district

House District 70
- Type: District of the Lower house
- Location: Iowa
- Representative: Norlin Mommsen
- Parent organization: Iowa General Assembly

The 70th District of the Iowa House of Representatives in the state of Iowa is composed of parts of Jackson, Clinton, and Scott counties.

== Representatives ==
The district has been represented by:

- Leighton Abel, 1951–1955
- Joseph C. Johnston, 1971–1973
- Russell De Jong, 1973–1975
- William W. Dieleman, 1975–1983
- Edward G. Parker, 1983–1989
- Glen Jesse, 1989–1993
- Ed Fallon, 1993–2003
- Carmine Boal, 2003–2009
- Kevin Koester, 2009–2013
- Todd Taylor, 2013–2019
- Tracy Ehlert, 2019–2023
- Norlin Mommsen, 2023–Present
