= Iowa's 8th House of Representatives district =

American legislative district

House District 8
- Type: District of the Lower house
- Location: Iowa
- Representative: Ann Meyer
- Parent organization: Iowa General Assembly

The 8th District of the Iowa House of Representatives in the state of Iowa. It is currently composed of part of Webster County.

== Current elected officials ==
Ann Meyer is the representative currently representing the district.

== Past representatives ==
The district has previously been represented by:

- Del Stromer, 1971–1973
- Terry Branstad, 1973–1979
- Clifford Branstad, 1979–1983
- Kenneth De Groot, 1983–1993
- Daniel P. Fogarty, 1993–1995
- William R. Salton, 1995–1997
- Marcella Frevert, 1997–2003
- Dolores Mertz, 2003–2011
- Tom W. Shaw, 2011–2013
- Henry Rayhons, 2013–2015
- Terry Baxter, 2015–2019
