= Todd Taylor =

American politician

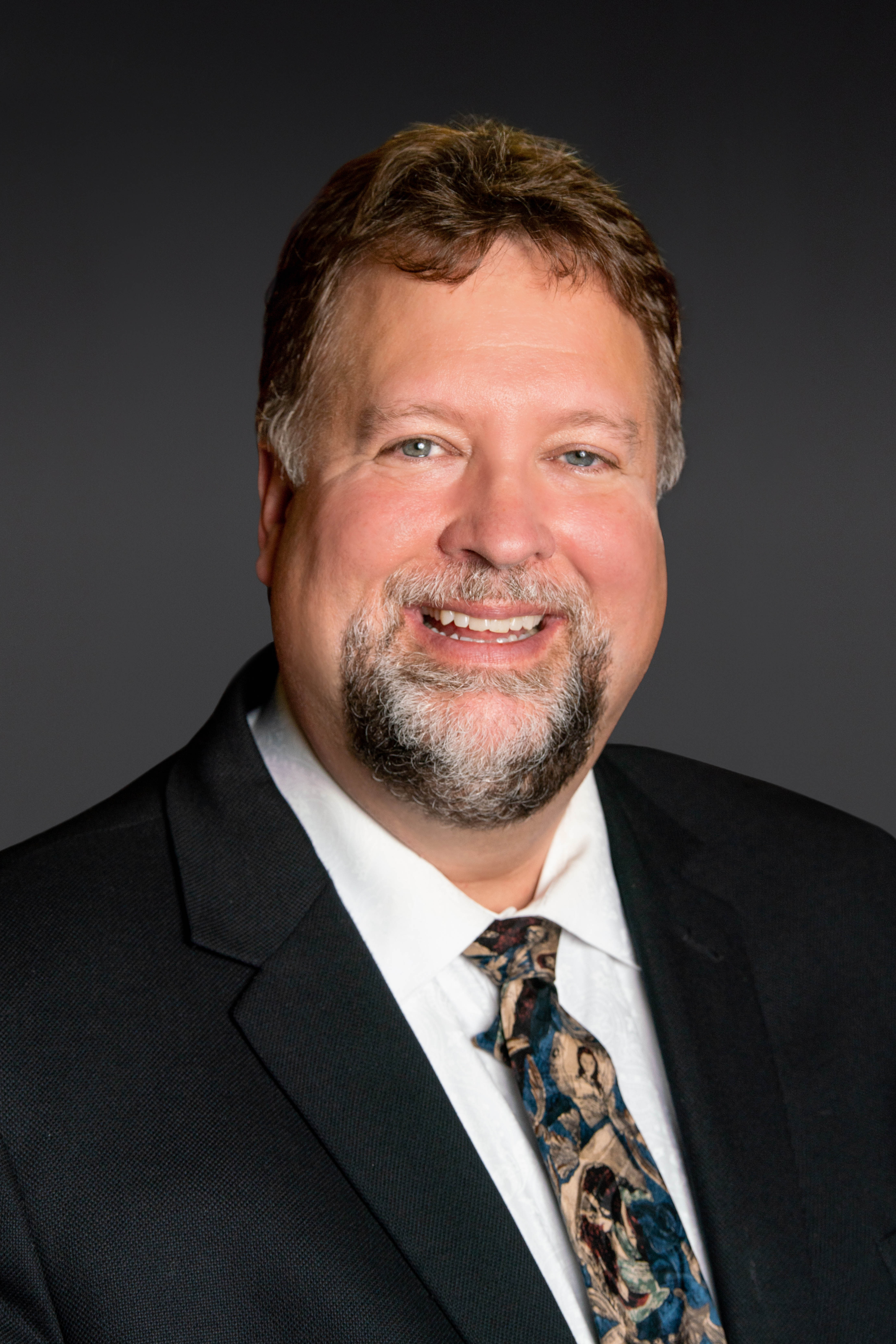

Member of the Iowa Senate from the 40th district
- In office January 14, 2019 – January 13, 2025
- Preceded by: Wally Horn
- Succeeded by: Art Staed
- Constituency: District 40 - (2023-Present); District 35 - (2019-2023)

Member of the Iowa House of Representatives from the 70th district
- In office 1995–2019
- Preceded by: Richard Running
- Succeeded by: Tracy Ehlert

Personal details
- Born: May 21, 1966 (age 60) Ames, Iowa, U.S.
- Party: Democratic
- Spouse: Kim
- Education: Graceland College (BA); University of Northern Iowa (BS)
- Website: Taylor's website

Todd Taylor (born May 21, 1966) is the Iowa State Senator from the 40th District. A Democrat, he has served in the Iowa Senate since 2019. Previously between 1995 and 2019 he had served in the Iowa House of Representatives from the 70th District. He received his BA from Graceland College and his BS from the University of Northern Iowa.

As of September 2011, Taylor serves on several committees in the Iowa House - the Appropriations, Labor, and State Government committees. He also serves as ranking member of the Justice System Appropriations Subcommittee and as a member of the Iowa Law Enforcement Academy Council and of the Statewide Fire and Police Retirement Board of Trustees.

Taylor was first elected in a June 27, 1995 special election, succeeding fellow Democrat Richard Running in the 54th District.

== Electoral history ==
*incumbent

House District 54 elections (2000 – 2018)

| Election | Political result | Candidate | Party | Votes | % |
|---|---|---|---|---|---|
| Iowa House of Representatives special elections, 1995; District 54; Turnout: 4,924 | Democratic hold | Todd Taylor | Democratic | 2,756 | 56.0 |
| Iowa House of Representatives special elections, 1995; District 54; Turnout: 4,924 | Democratic hold | Steve Buhr | Republican | 2,068 | 42.0 |
| Iowa House of Representatives special elections, 1995; District 54; Turnout: 4,924 | Democratic hold | Rosanne Freeburg | Independent | 94 | 1.9 |
| Iowa House of Representatives elections, 1996; District 54; Turnout: 13,007 | Democratic hold | Todd Taylor* | Democratic | 7,236 | 55.6 |
| Iowa House of Representatives elections, 1996; District 54; Turnout: 13,007 | Democratic hold | Steve Buhr | Republican | 5,759 | 44.3 |
| Iowa House of Representatives elections, 1998; District 54; Turnout: 10,422 | Democratic hold | Todd Taylor* | Democratic | 6,120 | 58.7 |
| Iowa House of Representatives elections, 1998; District 54; Turnout: 10,422 | Democratic hold | Rick Kullander | Republican | 4,292 | 41.2 |
| Iowa House of Representatives elections, 2000; District 54 | Democratic hold | Todd Taylor* | Democratic | unopposed | |

| Election | Political result | Candidate | Party | Votes | % |
|---|---|---|---|---|---|
| Iowa House of Representatives elections, 2002; District 70; Turnout: 10,766 | Democratic (newly redistricted) | Todd Taylor* | Democratic | 6,164 | 57.3 |
| Iowa House of Representatives elections, 2002; District 70; Turnout: 10,766 | Democratic (newly redistricted) | Charles H. Wieneke | Republican | 4,590 | 42.6 |
| Iowa House of Representatives elections, 2004; District 70 | Democratic hold | Todd Taylor* | Democratic | unopposed | |
| Iowa House of Representatives elections, 2006; District 70; Turnout: 10,929 | Democratic hold | Todd Taylor* | Democratic | 7,312 | 66.9 |
| Iowa House of Representatives elections, 2006; District 70; Turnout: 10,929 | Democratic hold | David Gochenouer | Republican | 3,608 | 33.0 |
| Iowa House of Representatives elections, 2008; District 70 | Democratic hold | Todd Taylor* | Democratic | unopposed | |
| Iowa House of Representatives elections, 2010; District 70; Turnout: 10,771 | Democratic hold | Todd Taylor* | Democratic | 5,959 | 55.3 |
| Iowa House of Representatives elections, 2010; District 70; Turnout: 10,771 | Democratic hold | Jim Burke | Republican | 4,246 | 39.4 |

| Election | Political result | Candidate | Party | Votes | % |
|---|---|---|---|---|---|
| Iowa State Senate elections, 2018; District 35 | Democratic hold | Todd Taylor | Democratic | unopposed | |

== Voting record ==
In the 2017 legislative session, Taylor voted against a $638,000 cut to the Department of Veterans Affairs and Iowa Veterans Home.

Iowa Senate
| Preceded by Ken Rozenboom | 40th District; 2023 – Present | Succeeded by Incumbent |
| Preceded by Wally Horn | 35th District; 2013 – 2019 | Succeeded by Chris Cournoyer |
Iowa House of Representatives
| Preceded by | 70th District; 2013 – 2019 | Succeeded by Tracy Ehlert |
| Preceded by Robert Osterhaus | 34th District; 2003 – 2013 | Succeeded by |
| Preceded by Richard Running | 54th District; 1995 – 2003 | Succeeded by Christopher Rants |
