= Michael J. O'Brien =

American politician (born 1939)

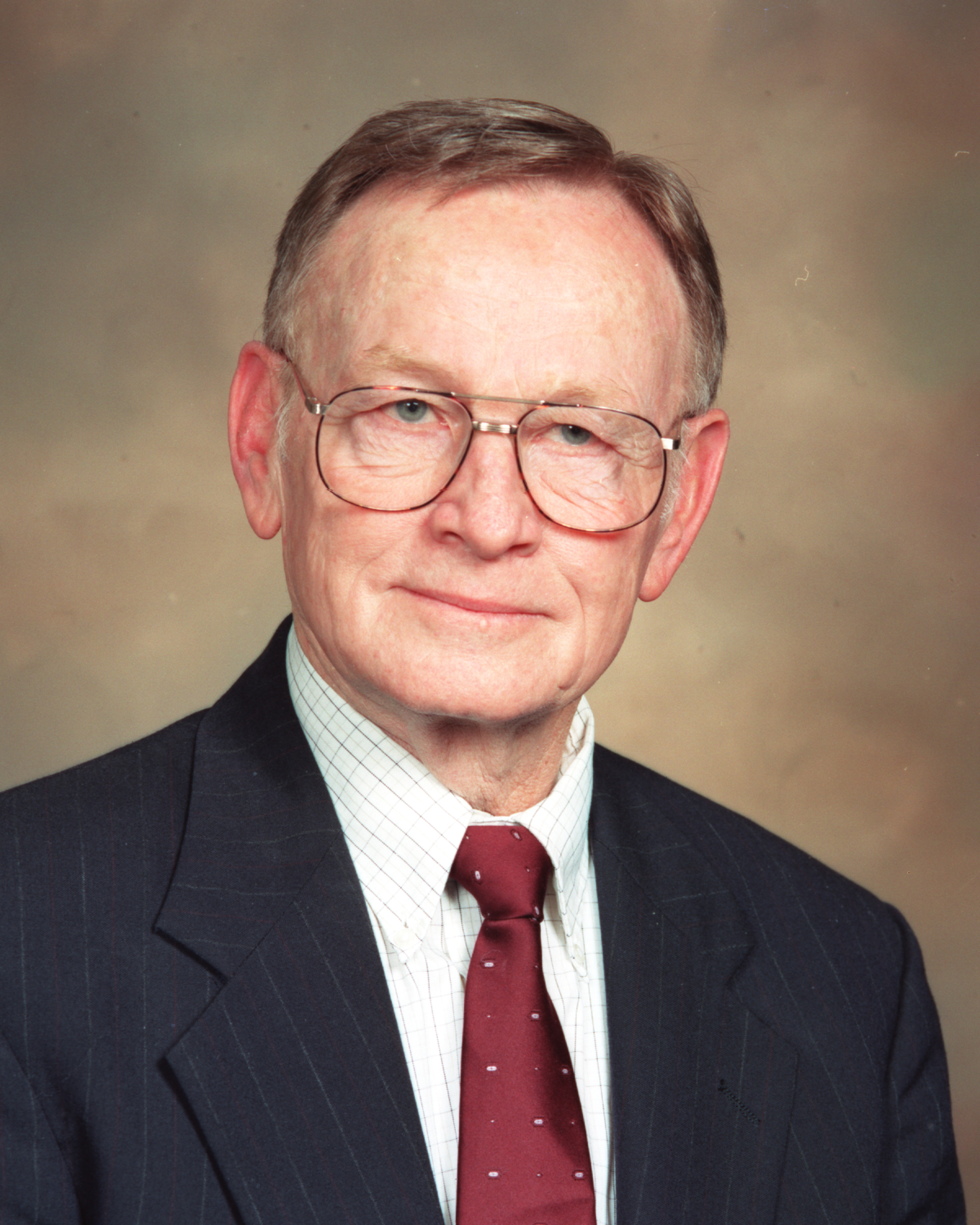

Member of the Iowa House of Representatives
- In office January 11, 1993 – January 12, 2003

Personal details
- Born: May 4, 1939 (age 87) Shenandoah, Iowa, U.S.
- Party: Democratic
- Spouse: Ronna
- Children: 8
- Occupation: teacher

Michael J. O'Brien (born May 4, 1939) is an American politician in the state of Iowa.

O'Brien was born in Shenandoah, Iowa. He attended Iowa State University and the University of Northern Iowa and was a teacher. A Democrat, he served in the Iowa House of Representatives from 1993 to 2003 (79th district).
