= Ann Meyer =

American politician (born 1965)

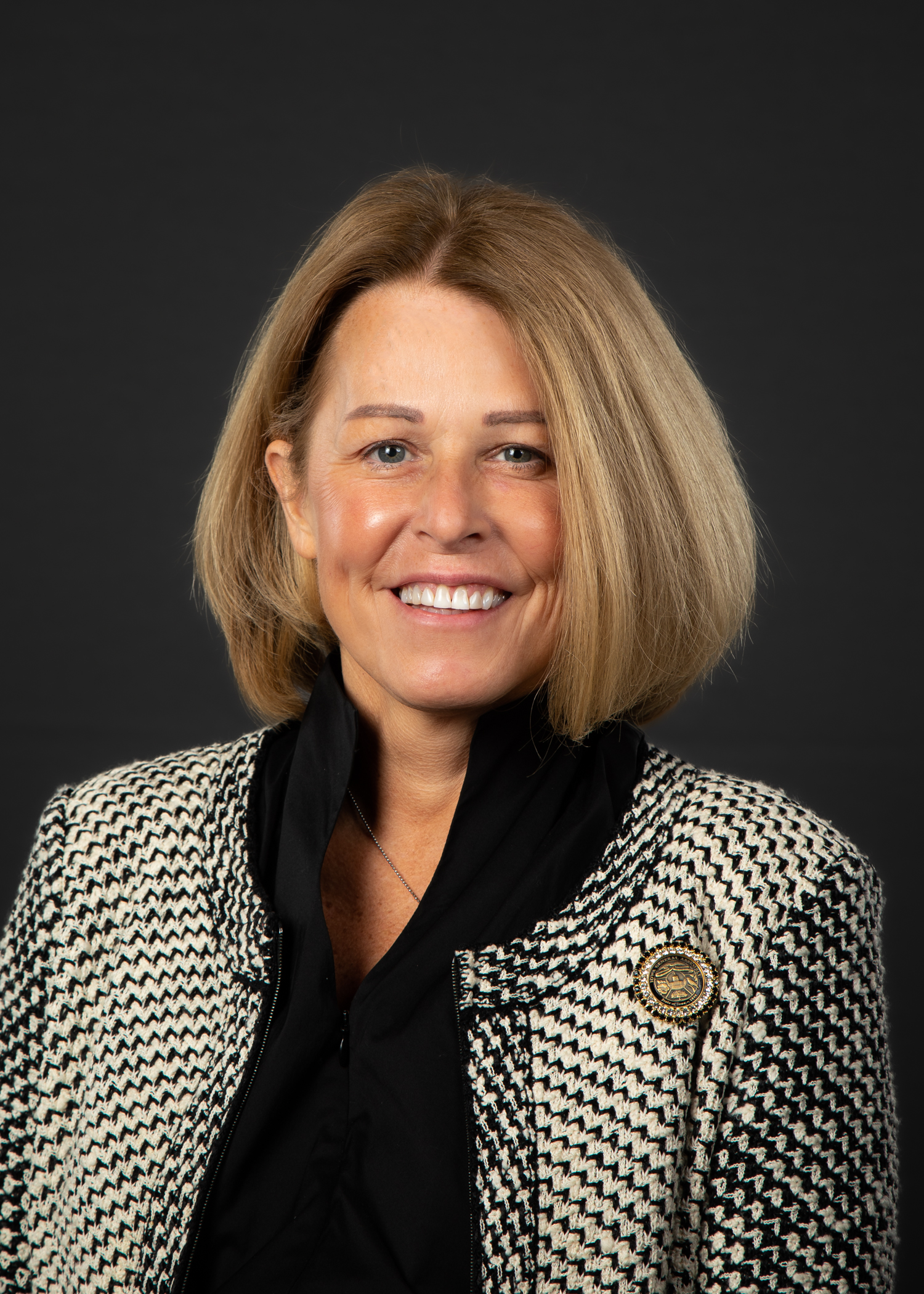

Member of the Iowa House of Representatives from the 8th district
- Incumbent
- Assumed office January 14, 2019
- Preceded by: Helen Miller

Personal details
- Born: 1965 (age 60–61) Redford, Michigan, U.S.
- Party: Republican
- Education: University of Detroit Mercy (BS)

Ann Meyer (born 1965) is an American politician and nurse serving as a member of the Iowa House of Representatives from the 8th district. Elected in November 2018, she assumed office on January 14, 2019.

== Early life and education ==
Meyer was born in Redford, Michigan in 1965. She earned a Bachelor of Science degree in nursing from the University of Detroit Mercy.

== Career ==
Outside of politics, Meyer works as a nurse. She has also been a nursing instructor at Iowa Central Community College. Meyer was elected to the Iowa House of Representatives in November 2018 and assumed office on January 14, 2019. Meyer also serves as chair of the House Human Resources Committee.

Iowa House of Representatives
Preceded by Terry Baxter	8th District; 2023 – present	Succeeded by Incumbent
Preceded by Helen Miller	9th District; 2019 – 2023	Succeeded by Henry Stone
