= Gary Carlson (politician) =

American politician (born 1950)

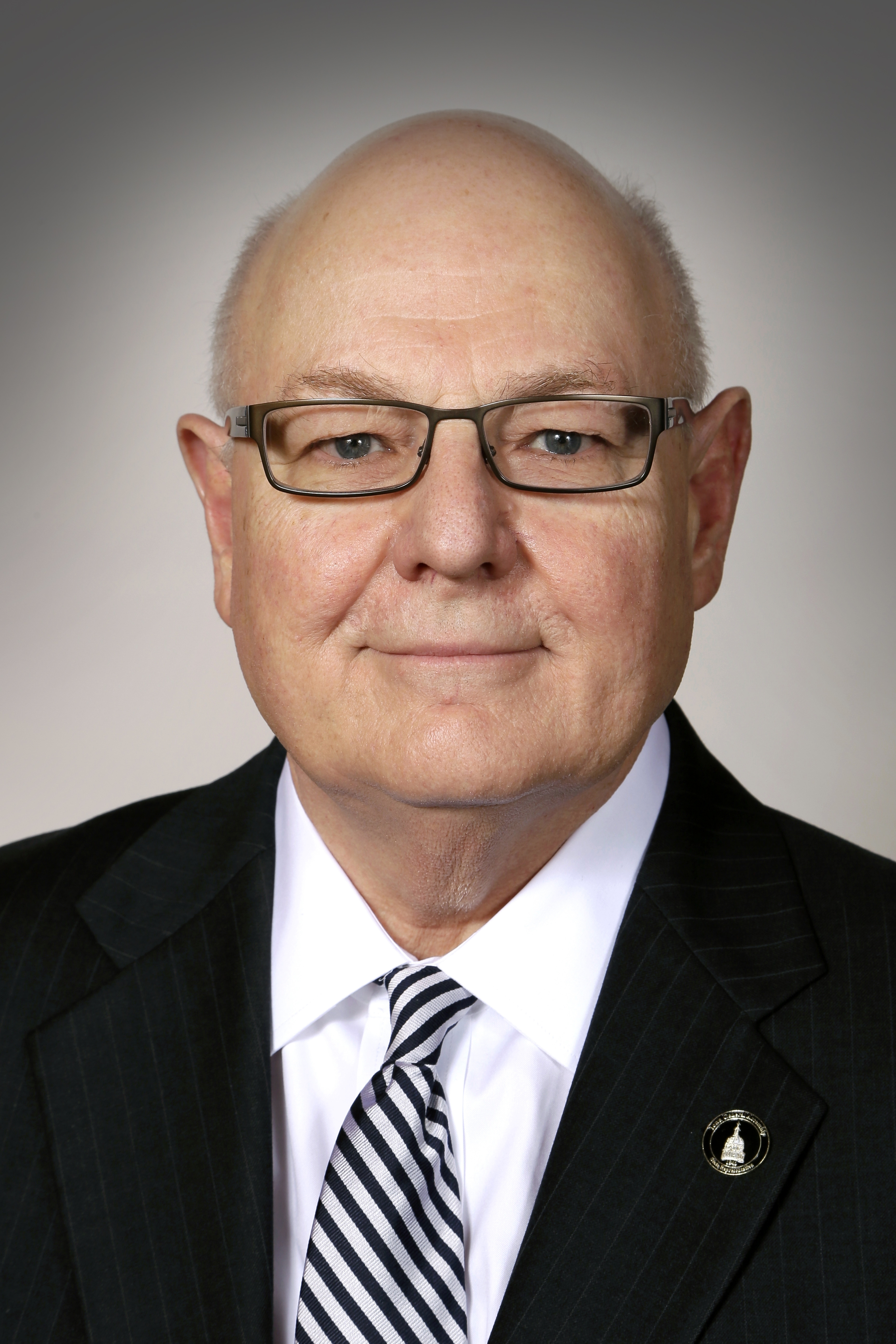

Member of the Iowa House of Representatives from the 91st district
- Incumbent
- Assumed office January 12, 2015
- Preceded by: Mark Lofgren
- Succeeded by: Mark Cisneros

Personal details
- Born: December 27, 1950 (age 75) Cedar Falls, Iowa, U.S.
- Party: Republican
- Spouse: Sheryl
- Children: 5
- Education: University of Iowa

Gary L. Carlson (born December 27, 1950) is the Iowa State Representative from the 91st District. A Republican, he has served in the Iowa House of Representatives since 2015.
