= Jarad Klein =

American politician

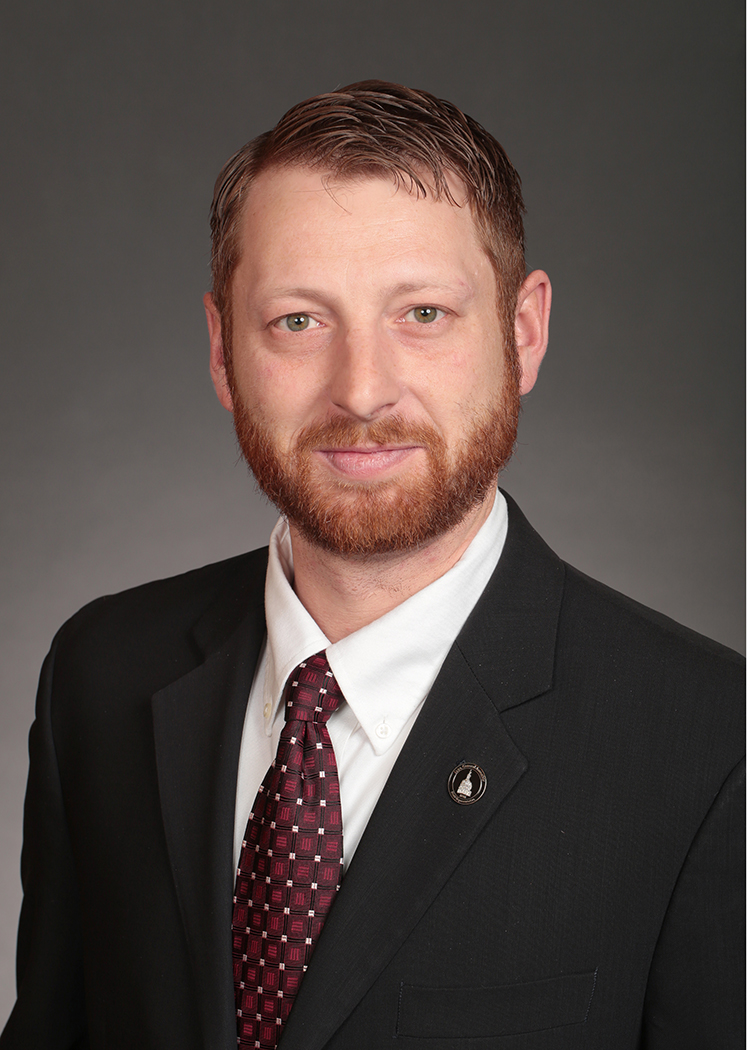

Member of the Iowa House of Representatives from the 78th district 89th (2011–2013)
- In office January 10, 2011 – January 9, 2023
- Preceded by: Larry Marek
- Succeeded by: Sami Scheetz

Personal details
- Born: March 3, 1981 (age 45) Keota, Iowa
- Party: Republican
- Profession: Farmer
- Website: Klein's website

Jarad Klein (born 1981) is a former Iowa State Representative from the 78th District. A Republican, he served in the Iowa House of Representatives from 2011 to 2023. Klein was born in Keota, Iowa.

As of January 2013, Klein serves on several committees in the Iowa House – the Environmental Protection, Labor, and Public Safety committees. He also serves as the Vice Chair of the Agriculture committee and as the Vice Chair of the Agriculture and Natural Resources Appropriations Subcommittee.

== Electoral history ==
Klein won 68.86% of votes (2,085) over Chris Canny during the District 89 Iowa House of Representatives primary elections in 2010. During the general elections, he defeated incumbent Democrat Larry Marek with 52.28% of the vote (6,339). During the 2012 Iowa House of Representatives primary elections, he won the Republican nomination as the incumbent over Priscilla Marlar with 75.51% of the vote (2,310). District 87 was redistricted ahead of Iowa's 2012 House of Representatives elections and Klein held onto his seat unopposed.

Iowa House of Representatives
Preceded by Larry Marek	89th District; 2011–2013	Succeeded by Jim Lykam
Preceded by Vicki Lensing	78th District; 2013 – 2023	Succeeded by Sami Scheetz
