= Tracy Ehlert =

American politician (born 1978)

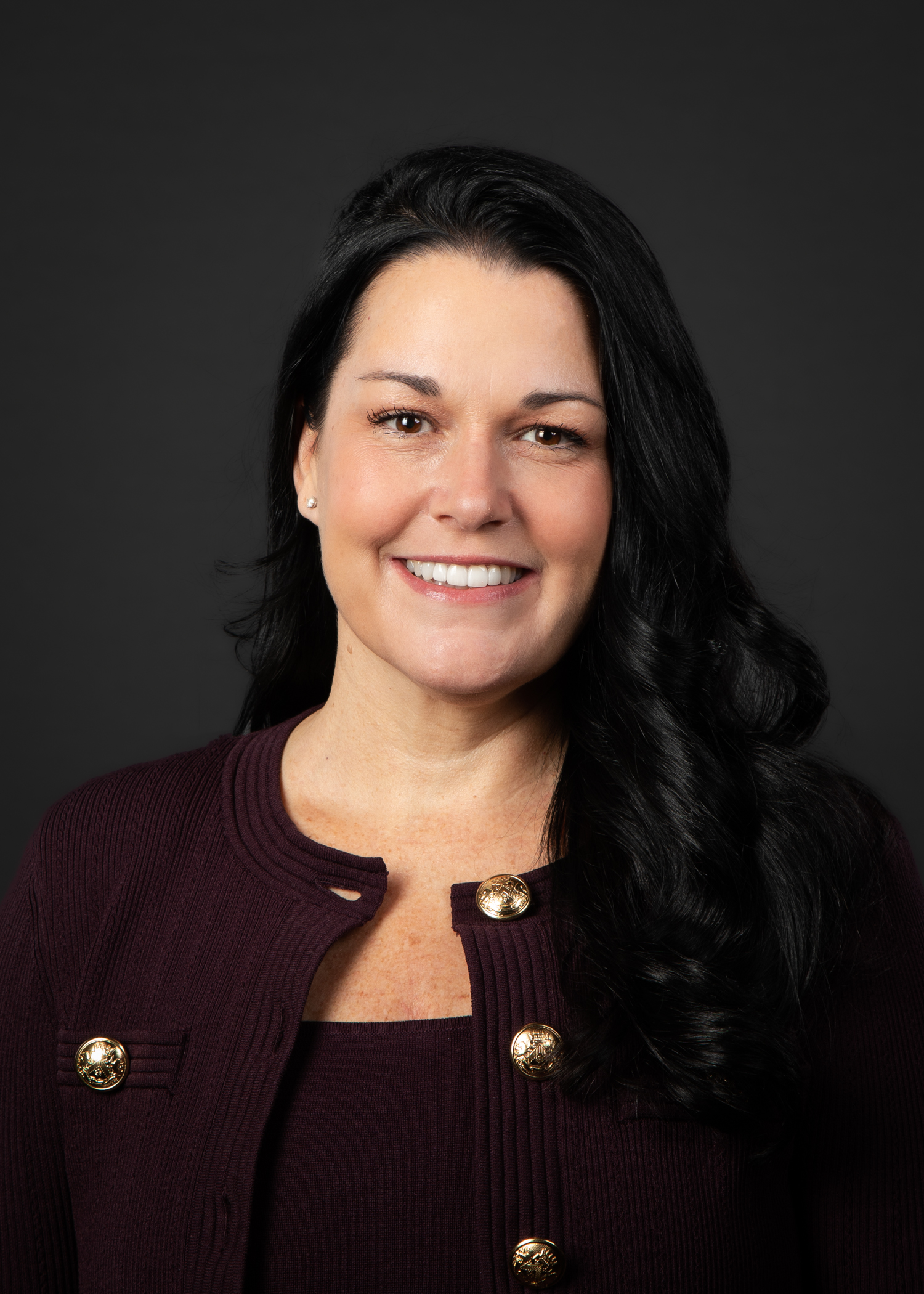
- Ehlert in 2023

Member of the Iowa House of Representatives from the 79th district
- Incumbent
- Assumed office January 14, 2019
- Preceded by: Todd Taylor

Personal details
- Born: 1978 (age 47–48) San Bernardino, California, U.S.
- Party: Democratic
- Occupation: Early childhood educator Small business owner

Tracy Ehlert (born 1978) is an American politician. She is a Democrat representing the 79th district in the Iowa House of Representatives.

== Early life ==
Tracy Ehlert was born in 1978 in San Bernardino, California. She received an associate's degree in information systems management from Kirkwood Community College in Cedar Rapids, followed by another associate's in early childhood education from Marshalltown Community College. She later received a bachelor's degree in early childhood education from Ashford University, followed by a master's degree from Walden University focused on teaching and diversity in early childhood education.

== Political career ==
In 2017, Ehlert announced she was running to represent District 70 in the Iowa House of Representatives, after former representative Todd Taylor decided to run for a seat in the State Senate. She was unopposed in the Democratic primary and went on to win the general election. She ran for re-elections in 2020, 2022, and 2024, and won all three general elections.

Ehlert currently sits on the following committees:

- Education (ranking member)
- Economic Growth and Technology
- Health & Human Services
- Labor & Workforce
- Education Appropriations Subcommittee

=== Electoral record ===
2018 general election: Iowa House of Representatives, District 70
Party	Candidate	Votes	%
Democratic	Tracy Ehlert	9,364	76.5%
Libertarian	Myra Matejka	2,764	22.6%
	Other/Write-in	113	0.9%

2020 general election: Iowa House of Representatives, District 70
Party	Candidate	Votes	%
Democratic	Tracy Ehlert	10,916	74.1%
Libertarian	Myra Matejka	2,764	25.1%
	Other/Write-in	127	0.9%

2022 general election: Iowa House of Representatives, District 79
Party	Candidate	Votes	%
Democratic	Tracy Ehlert	8,622	95.9%
	Other/Write-in	370	4.1%

2024 general election: Iowa House of Representatives, District 79
Party	Candidate	Votes	%
Democratic	Tracy Ehlert	9,222	60.7%
Republican	Barclay Woerner	5,947	39.2%
	Other/Write-in	19	0.1%

== Personal life ==
Ehlert lives in Cedar Rapids with her husband, Justin, and two sons. Before running for office, she worked in early childhood education and owned a related small business, Babies 2 Kids Learning Center, in Cedar Rapids for over ten years.

Iowa House of Representatives
Preceded by Dustin Hite	79th District; 2023 – present	Succeeded by Incumbent
Preceded by Todd Taylor	70th District; 2019 – 2023	Succeeded by Norlin Mommsen
