= Lee Hein =

American politician

Lee Hein (born March 13, 1960) is an American politician from Iowa. Hein is a former Republican member of the Iowa House of Representatives from District 96.

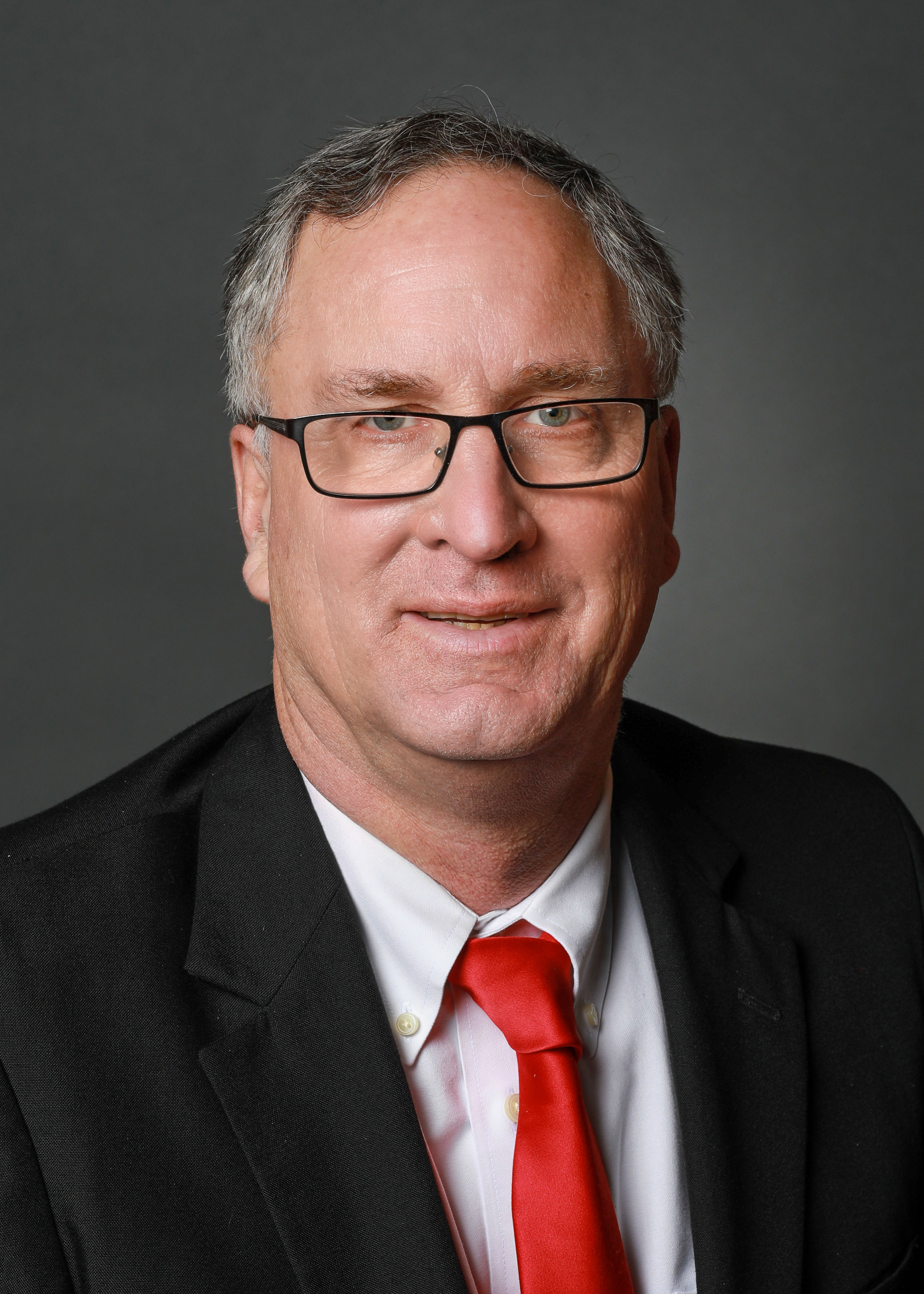

== Early life ==
On March 13, 1960, Hein was born in Monticello, Iowa.

== Education ==
Hein attended Iowa State University.

== Career ==
On November 2, 2010 Hein won the election and became a member of the Iowa House of Representatives for District 31.

== Personal life ==
Hein's wife is Jacky. They have two children.
