= Guy Vander Linden =

American politician

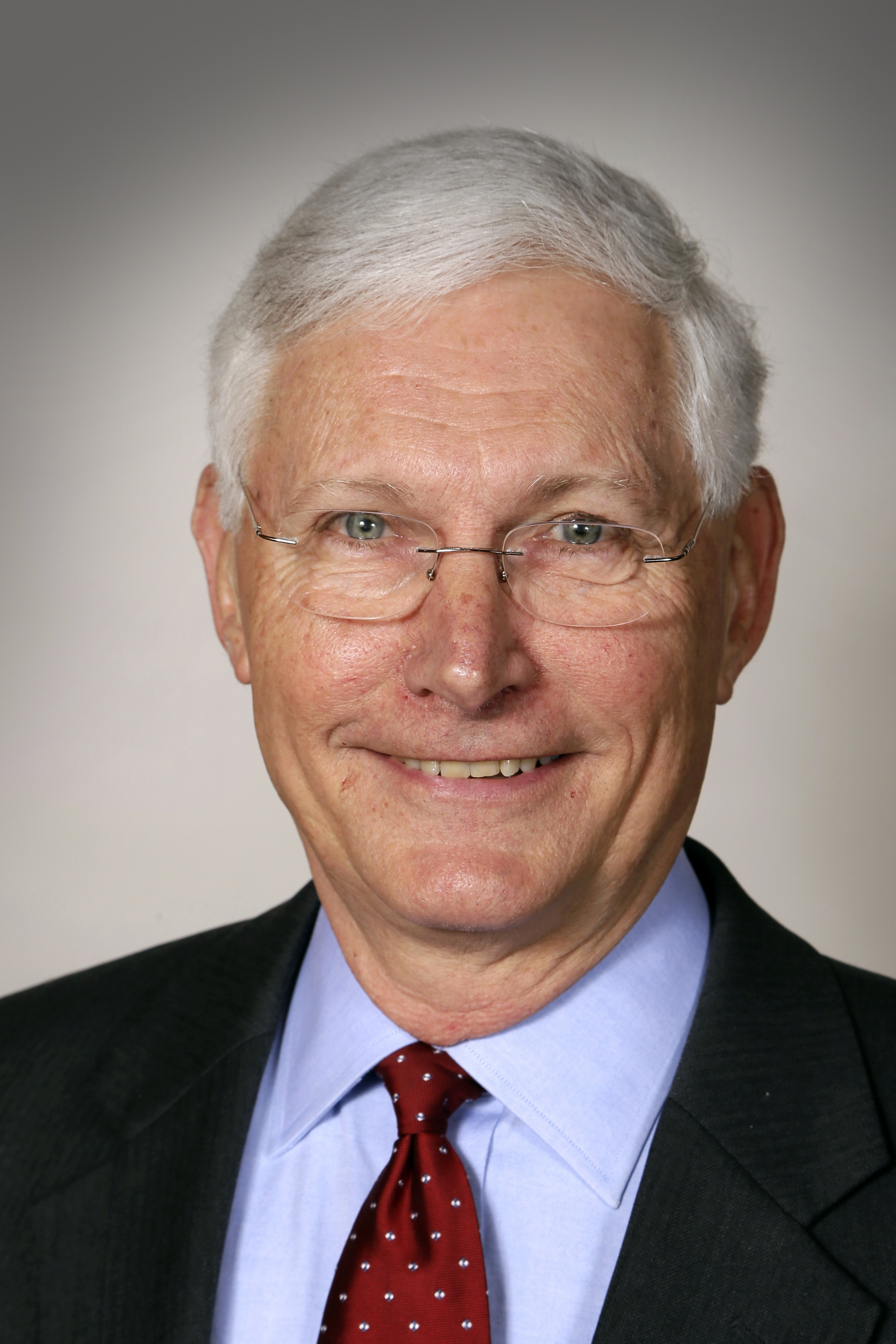

Member of the Iowa House of Representatives from the 84th district
- Incumbent
- Assumed office January 10, 2011

Personal details
- Born: April 6, 1948 (age 78) Oskaloosa, Iowa, U.S.
- Party: Republican
- Spouse: Carrie Vander Linden
- Children: Four
- Education: University of Iowa; University of Southern California
- Profession: Marine, politician

Guy Vander Linden (born April 6, 1948) is an American politician of the Republican Party serving as a member of the Iowa House of Representatives for the state's 84th district. He was elected to his first term in office in 2010.

Vander Linden is a native of Oskaloosa, Iowa and grew up in a family of Dutch origin. He attended the University of Iowa and became a member of the Iowa Beta chapter of Sigma Alpha Epsilon fraternity, graduating with a bachelor's degree in 1970. He received a master's degree from the University of Southern California. He served a United States Marine, eventually reaching the rank of Brigadier General.

== Sources ==
- Iowa State Legislature website listing
- Linden campaign website
- Iowa House Republicans website
