= Mary Mascher =

American politician (born 1952)

Mary J. Mascher
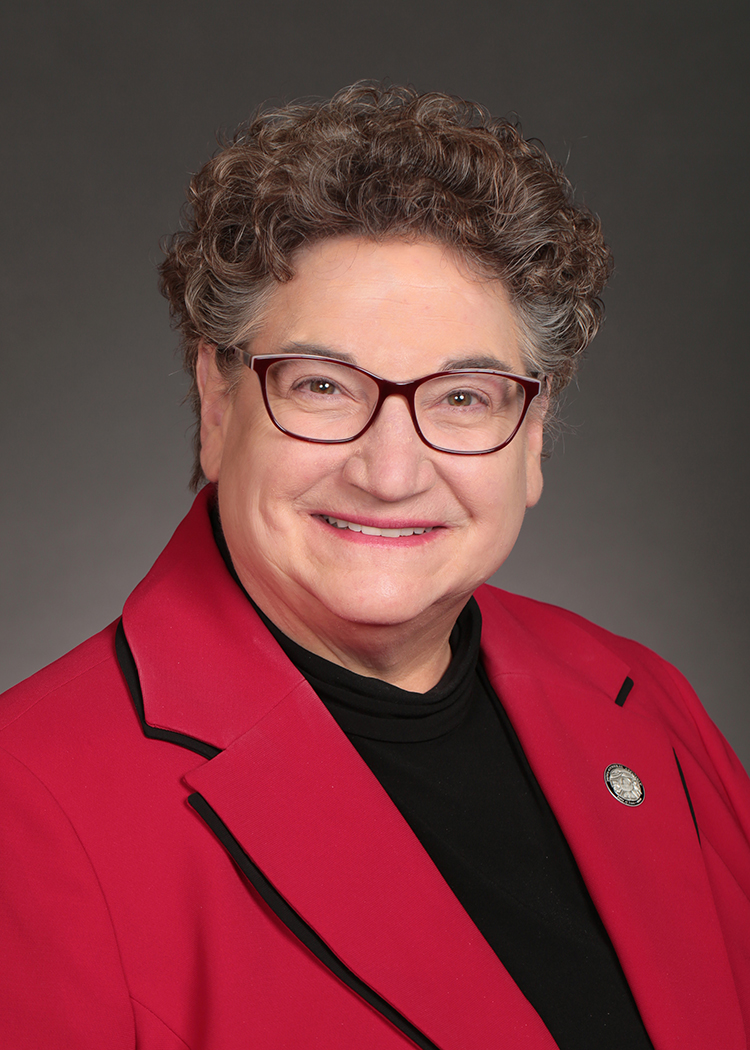

Member of the Iowa House of Representatives from the 86th district
- In office 1995–2023
- Preceded by: Mary Neuhauser
- Succeeded by: David Jacoby (redistricting)

Personal details
- Born: September 22, 1952 (age 74) Iowa City, Iowa, U.S.
- Party: Democratic
- Children: 1
- Education: University of Iowa
- Profession: Educator
- Website: Mascher's website

Mary J. Mascher (born September 22, 1952) is an American politician who served in the Iowa House of Representatives from 1995 to 2023. She received her BA and MA from the University of Iowa.

Mascher currently serves on several committees in the Iowa House: the State Government committee; the Labor committee; and the Education committee. She is also an assistant minority leader. Her prior political experience includes serving as the chair of the Johnson County Democratic Party from 1986 to 1988, serving as a member of the Parks and Recreation Commission from 1974 to 1977, and serving as a member of the Iowa City River Front commission from 1974 to 1977.

Mascher was re-elected in 1996, 1998, 2000, 2002, 2004, 2006, 2008, 2010, and in 2012. In 2006 she won with 6,236 votes, running unopposed.

Iowa House of Representatives
Preceded by ??	46th District; 1995 – 2003	Succeeded by Lisa Heddens
Preceded by Jodi Tymeson	77th District; 2003 – 2013	Succeeded by
Preceded by	86th District; 2013 – 2023	Succeeded by David Jacoby
