= Norlin Mommsen =

American politician

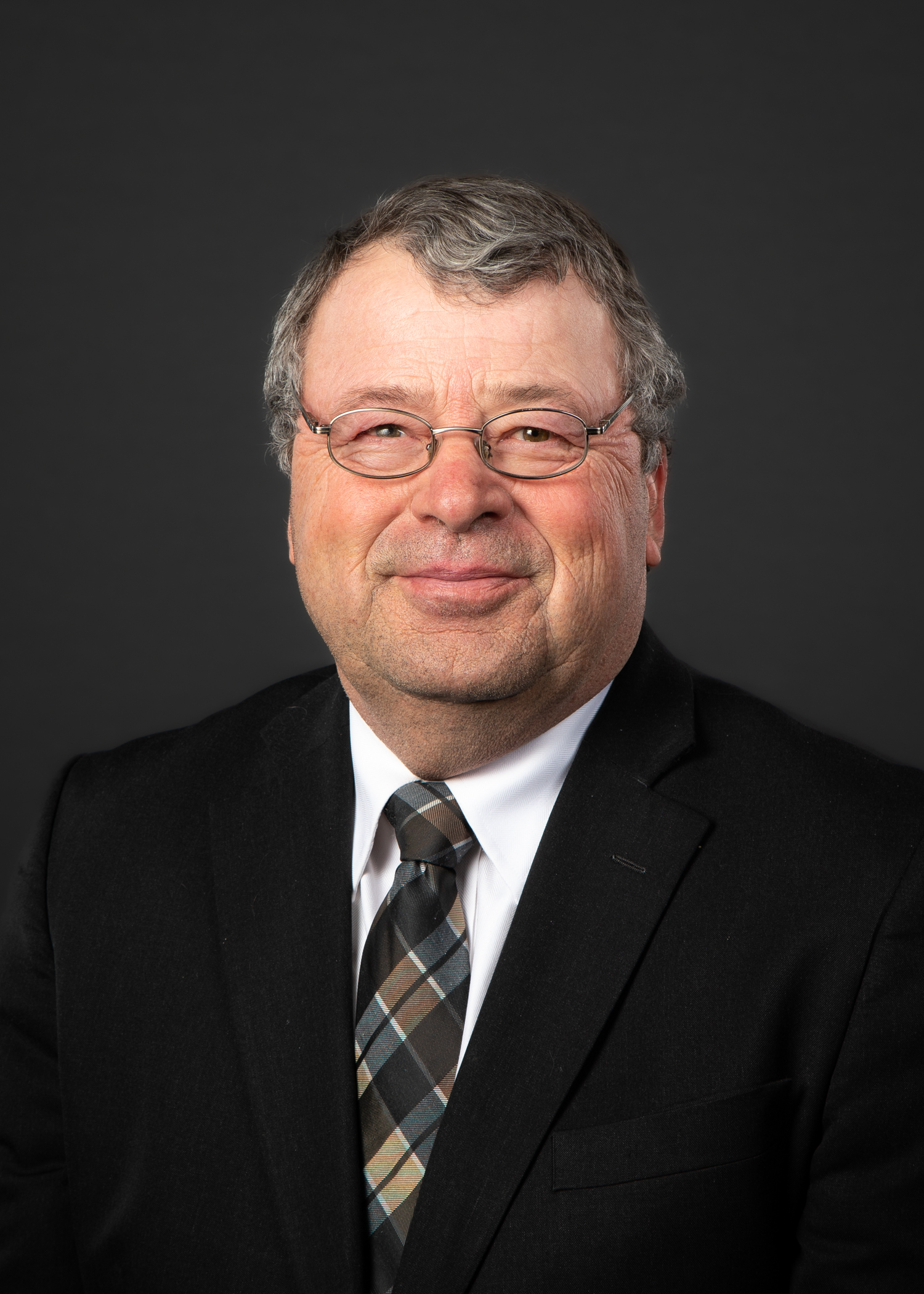

Member of the Iowa House of Representatives from the 70th district
- Incumbent
- Assumed office January 9, 2023

Member of the Iowa House of Representatives from the 97th district
- In office January 12, 2015 – January 8, 2023

Personal details
- Born: November 2, 1957 (age 68) Clinton, Iowa, U.S.
- Party: Republican
- Spouse: Denise
- Children: five
- Profession: farmer

Norlin Mommsen (born November 2, 1957) is the Iowa State Representative from the 70th District. He has served as a Republican in the Iowa House of Representatives since 2015.

In February 2017, Rep. Mommsen threatened a teacher & constituent who spoke out against his stance on Chapter 20.

In February 2022, Rep. Mommsen sponsored a bill which would have required Iowa public schools to install cameras in every classroom so parents could watch the livestreams. The bill was tabled because it lacked the votes to clear a House subcommittee. While explaining his disappointment that the bill had stalled, Rep. Mommsen said, “I think what is important is the conversation takes place and that's what I was trying to provoke here was a conversation ... It's a big meat grinder and who knows what comes out the other end.”

Iowa House of Representatives
Preceded by Tracy Ehlert	70th District; 2023 – present	Succeeded by Incumbent
Preceded by	97th District; 2015 – 2023	Succeeded by Ken Croken
