= David Maxwell (American politician) =

American politician (1943–2024)

Dave Maxwell
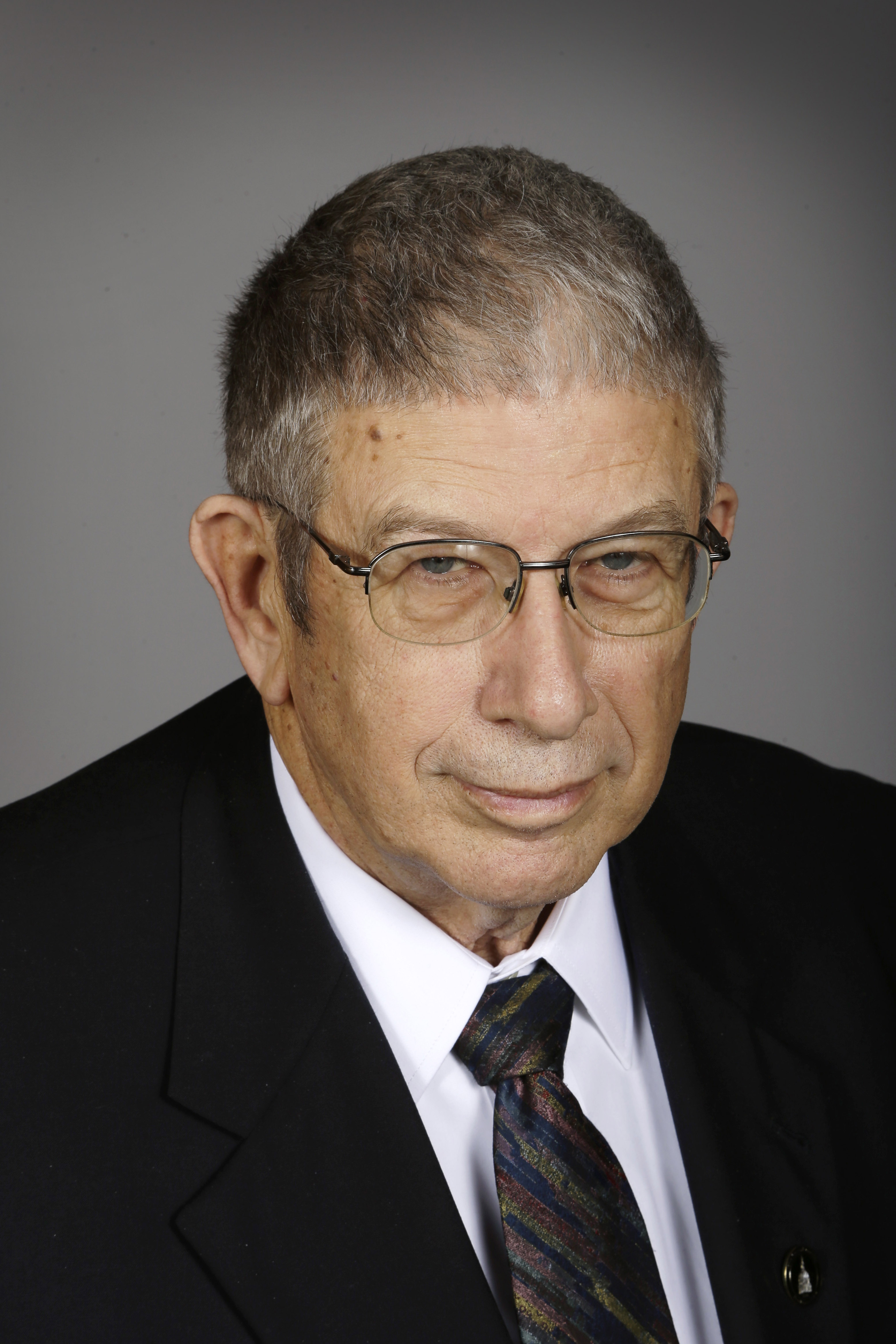
- Official portrait, 2013

Member of the Iowa House of Representatives from the 76th district
- In office January 14, 2013 – January 9, 2023
- Preceded by: Betty De Boef
- Succeeded by: Derek Wulf

Personal details
- Born: October 3, 1943 Deep River, Iowa, U.S.
- Died: November 4, 2024 (aged 81) Iowa City, Iowa, U.S.
- Party: Republican
- Spouse: Kristin
- Children: 4
- Occupation: Contractor, farmer, politician

David Elver Maxwell (October 3, 1943 – November 4, 2024) was an American politician in the state of Iowa who served as the State Representative from the 76th District. A Republican, he served in the Iowa House of Representatives from 2013 to 2023, when he was defeated in the Republican Primary.

== Biography ==
Maxwell grew up in the Deep River area, graduated from Montezuma High School in 1961, worked for three years to earn money for college, and then attended the University of Northern Iowa and Iowa State University. Before graduating, he spent three years in the U.S. Army, including one in Pleiku, Republic of Vietnam. Upon returning to civilian life, he went into the agricultural tile business with his cousin. In 1974, he decided to go out on his own. He died in Iowa City, Iowa, on November 4, 2024, at the age of 81.
