= Bobby Kaufmann =

American politician (born 1985)

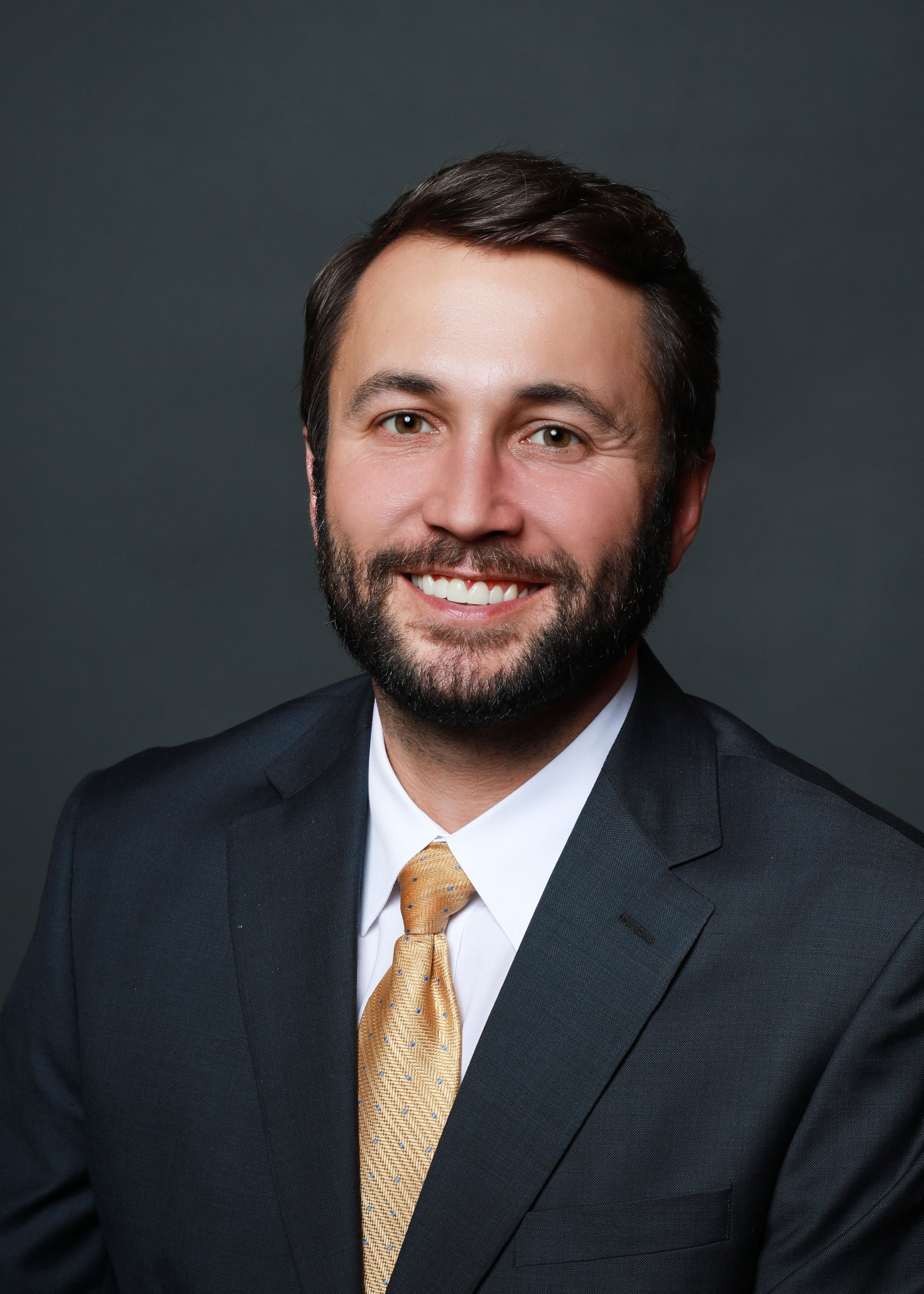
- Official portrait, 2021

Majority Leader of the Iowa House of Representatives
- Incumbent
- Assumed office August 4, 2025
- Preceded by: Matt Windschitl

Member of the Iowa House of Representatives
- Incumbent
- Assumed office January 14, 2013
- Preceded by: Julian Garrett
- Constituency: 73rd district (2013–2023); 82nd district (2023–present)

Personal details
- Born: June 1, 1985 (age 41) Wilton, Iowa, U.S.
- Party: Republican
- Spouse: Maria Vazquez
- Relatives: Jeff Kaufmann (father)
- Education: Muscatine Community College (attended); University of Iowa (attended)
- Website: State House website

Bobby Kaufmann (born 1985) is an American politician serving as a member of the Iowa House of Representatives since 2013 as a member of the Republican Party. In 2023, Kaufmann was appointed as a senior advisor on Donald Trump's 2024 presidential campaign in the Iowa caucuses. In August 2025, he was elected to be the House Majority Leader.

== Political career ==
Kaufmann first ran for office in 2012, winning election to the 73rd district seat previously held by his father Jeff Kaufmann. On August 4, 2025, he was elected to be the House Majority Leader, due to Matt Windschitl running for election to the US House.

=== Arrests ===
His February 2012 arrest and guilty plea for public intoxication became a campaign issue. He received a deferred judgment, and the charge was removed from his record after completing probation. Kaufmann's arrest led to the revelation that Kaufmann had at least 17 citations and arrests, mostly for traffic-related issues.

=== LGBT controversy ===
Kaufmann ignited controversy by using his position as Chair of the Iowa House Government Oversight Committee to launch an investigation into an LGBT youth conference in Iowa. After controversy arose over his investigation, Kaufmann claims he read blogs and received an email alleging that Kaufmann was a homosexual himself. In reaction, Kaufmann testified before the Iowa House Government Oversight Committee that he was not in a homosexual relationship with colleague Greg Heartsill, stating "I am here to announce that Rep. Heartsill and I are not in a homosexual relationship."

=== "Suck it Up Buttercup" bill ===
Following the 2016 presidential election, Kaufmann announced that he planned to introduce a bill in the January legislative session that would penalize state universities that used public funding to offer election-related counseling and other support services to students that are beyond the scope of existing mental health resources.

The bill, which Kaufmann nicknamed the "Suck it up, Buttercup" bill, would cut the budget of state universities by double the amount they spend on such activities and introduce criminal penalties for protesters that block highways.

In an interview with Fox & Friends on November 16, Kaufmann claimed that there were post-election "cry rooms" and that he "was hearing reports of some schools that were bringing in ponies to be able get students through the election." These claims were untrue. When pressed for more details on these reports of coddling students during a live interview later that day with the Canadian radio show As It Happens, Kaufmann hung up and accused the program of having an agenda.

=== Voting legislation ===
In 2021, Kaufmann proposed legislation in the Iowa House of Representatives to restrict voting rights in Iowa. Kaufmann has promoted false claims of voter fraud.

=== Electoral history ===
Kaufmann ran in the 2012, 2014, 2016, 2018, 2020, 2022, and 2024 Republican primaries unopposed.

He was elected in November 2012, defeating Democrat Dick Schwab. He was reelected in November 2014, defeating Democrat David Johnson. He ran unopposed in 2016. He was reelected in November 2018, defeating Democrat Jodi Clemons. He was reelected in November 2020, defeating Democrat Lonny L. Pulkrabek. He was reelected in November 2022, defeating Libertarian Clyde Gibson. He was reelected in November 2024, defeating Democrat Phil Wiese.

Election	Political result	Candidate	Party	Votes	%
2012 Iowa House of Representatives General Election; District 73; Turnout: 16,084	Republican	Bobby Kaufmann	Republican	9,068	56.4
2012 Iowa House of Representatives General Election; District 73; Turnout: 16,084	Republican	Dick Schwab	Democratic	7,016	43.6

Election	Political result	Candidate	Party	Votes	%
2014 Iowa House of Representatives General Election; District 73; Turnout: 12,825	Republican win	Bobby Kaufmann	Republican	8,448	
2014 Iowa House of Representatives General Election; District 73; Turnout: 12,825	Republican win	David Johnson	Democratic	4,035	

Election	Political result	Candidate	Party	Votes	%
2018 Iowa House of Representatives General Election; District 73; Turnout: 14,601	Republican win	Bobby Kaufmann	Republican	8,004	
2018 Iowa House of Representatives General Election; District 73; Turnout: 14,601	Republican win	Jodi Clemens	Democratic	6,349	

Election	Political result	Candidate	Party	Votes	%
2020 Iowa House of Representatives General Election; District 73; Turnout: 18,958	Republican win	Bobby Kaufmann	Republican	11,067	
2020 Iowa House of Representatives General Election; District 73; Turnout: 18,958	Republican win	Lonny L. Pulkrabek	Democratic	7,307	

Election	Political result	Candidate	Party	Votes	%
2022 Iowa House of Representatives General Election; District 82; Turnout: 12,792	Republican win	Bobby Kaufmann	Republican	8,847	
2022 Iowa House of Representatives General Election; District 82; Turnout: 12,792	Republican win	Clyde Gibson	Iowa Libertarian Party	2,983	

Election	Political result	Candidate	Party	Votes	%
2024 Iowa House of Representatives General Election; District 82; Turnout: 17,550	Republican win	Bobby Kaufmann	Republican	10,312	
2024 Iowa House of Representatives General Election; District 82; Turnout: 17,550	Republican win	Phil Wiese	Democratic	6,716	

== Presidential politics ==
Kaufmann supported Marco Rubio's presidential candidacy in the 2016 Republican primary. In 2023, Kaufmann was hired by Donald Trump's 2024 presidential campaign to serve as a senior advisor for the Iowa caucuses.

== Family ==
Kaufmann is the son of former Iowa State Representative and current Republican Party of Iowa chairman Jeff Kaufmann and Vicki Wing Kaufmann. He has two brothers: Jacob and John. He also had a brother that was stillborn. He is a self-employed entrepreneur in demolition and hauling. He married his wife Maria in 2023 and they share two children.

Iowa House of Representatives
Preceded by Matt Windschitl	Majority Leader of the Iowa House of Representatives; 2025–present	Incumbent
