= David Kerr (Iowa politician) =

American politician

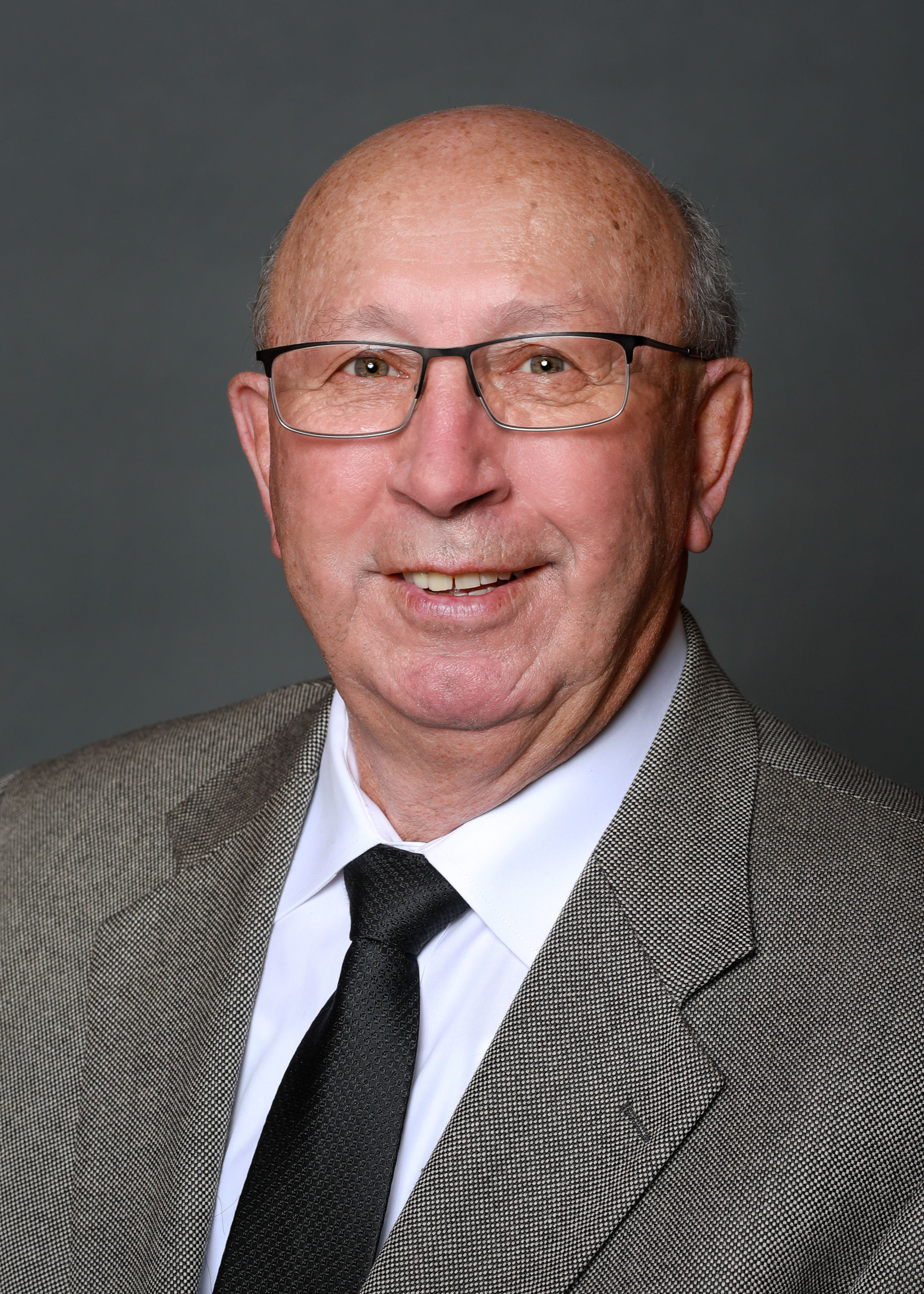

Member of the Iowa House of Representatives from the 88th district
- In office 2017–2023
- Preceded by: Tom Sands
- Succeeded by: Helena Hayes

Personal details
- Born: July 16, 1948 (age 78) Burlington, Iowa, U.S.
- Party: Republican
- Spouse: Joyce
- Children: two
- Education: Muscatine Community College
- Profession: farmer

David Kerr (born July 16, 1948) is an American former politician in the state of Iowa. He was elected to the Iowa House of Representatives in 2016.

Kerr was elected from Iowa House District 88, which includes all of Louisa County, most of Des Moines County, and northern and western Muscatine County.

While in the Iowa legislature, Kerr has been behind budgets that do not increase funding for Iowa public universities. Kerr's 2022 budget proposal allocated nearly $20 million less than the state gave to public universities in 1999 (not adjusted for inflation). Kerr defended the budget as "very adequate" in 2021.

Kerr decided not to seek reelection in 2022 to a fourth term.
