= Terry Baxter =

American politician in the state of Iowa

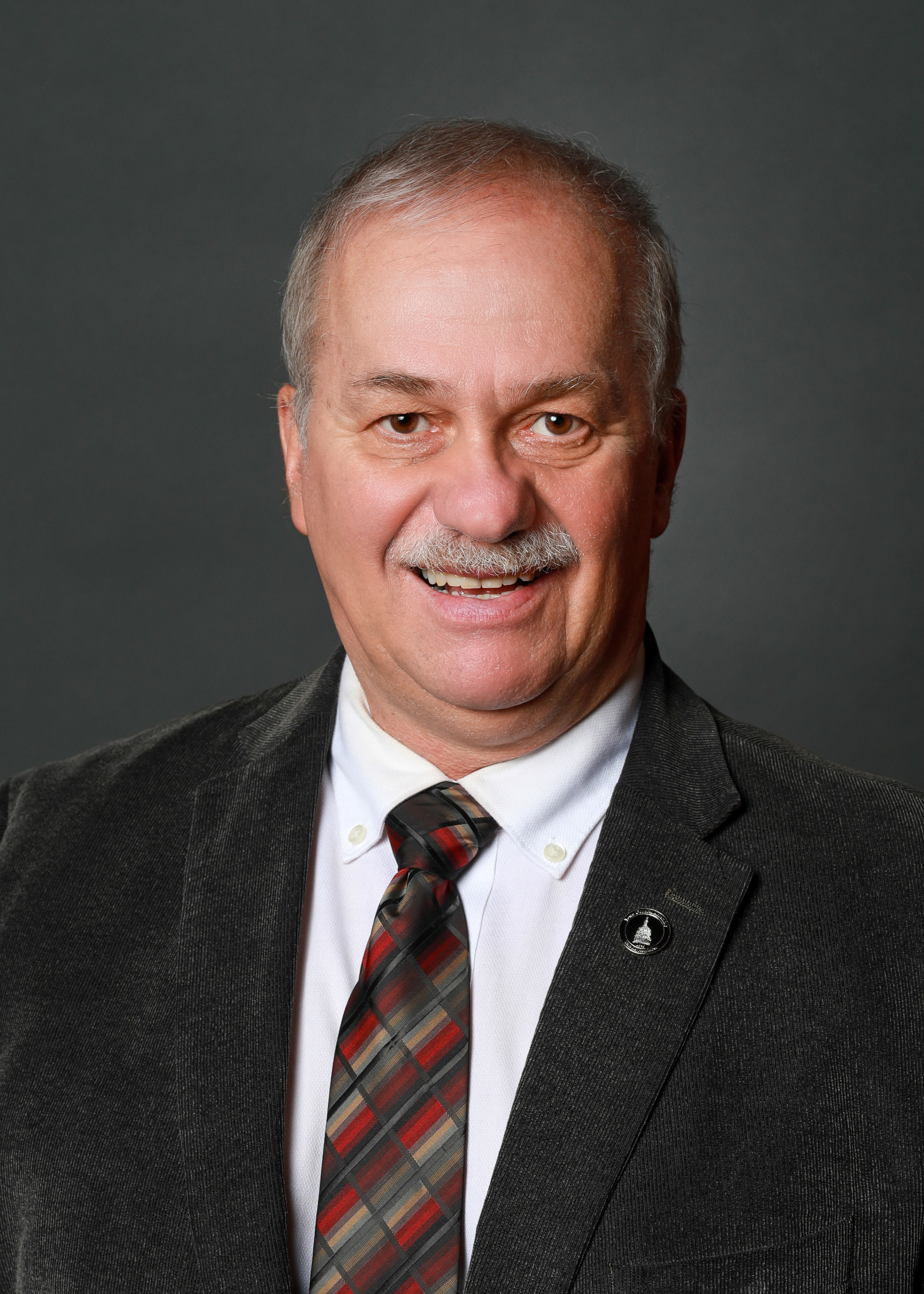
- Baxter in 2021

Member of the Iowa House of Representatives from the 8th district
- In office 2015–2023
- Preceded by: Henry Rayhons
- Succeeded by: Ann Meyer (redistricting)

Personal details
- Born: September 26, 1957 (age 68) Cambridge, Minnesota, U.S.
- Party: Republican
- Spouse: Debby
- Children: 9
- Education: St. Cloud State University, Moody Bible Institute
- Profession: Minister

Terry Clinton Baxter (born September 26, 1957) is an American politician in the state of Iowa. He was elected to the Iowa House of Representatives in 2014. He is also the Cofounder of GoServGlobal.
