= 2018 United States House of Representatives elections in Iowa =

- November 6, 2018

All 4 Iowa seats to the United States House of Representatives
	Majority party	Minority party
Party	Democratic	Republican
Last election	1	3
Seats won	3	1
Seat change	▲2	▼2
Popular vote	664,676	612,338
Percentage	50.5%	46.5%
Swing	▲6.05%	▼7.11%

Democratic hold Democratic gain
Republican hold
Democratic
40–50%
50–60%
60–70%
70–80%
Republican
40–50%
50–60%
60–70%
70–80%

The 2018 United States House of Representatives elections in Iowa were held on Tuesday, November 6, to elect the four U.S. representatives from the State of Iowa, one from each of the state's four congressional districts. The elections coincided with the gubernatorial election, as well as other elections to the House of Representatives, elections to the United States Senate, and various state and local elections. The state congressional delegation flipped from a 3–1 Republican majority to a 3–1 Democratic majority.

This was the first time the Democrats won the majority of Iowa's seats since 2010, and the first time they won the popular vote in the state since 2012. It was the last time Democrats would achieve either until the 2026 Democratic landslide.

== Overview ==
=== Statewide ===
Party	Candidates	Votes		Seats		
Party	Candidates	No.	%	No.	+/–	%
Democratic	4	664,676	50.48%	3	▲2	75.00%
Republican	4	612,338	46.51%	1	▼2	25.00%
Libertarian	4	29,894	2.27%	0	Steady	0.00%
Independent	3	5,100	0.39%	0	Steady	0.00%
Legal Marijuana Now	1	2,015	0.15%	0	Steady	0.00%
Green	1	1,888	0.14%	0	Steady	0.00%
Write-in		732	0.06%	0	Steady	0.00%
Total	17	1,316,643	100.00%	4	Steady	100.00%

Popular vote
Democratic	50.48%
Republican	46.51%
Libertarian	2.27%
Other	0.74%

House seats
Democratic	75.00%
Republican	25.00%

=== By district ===
Results of the 2018 United States House of Representatives elections in Iowa by district:

District	Democratic		Republican		Others		Total		Result
District	Votes	%	Votes	%	Votes	%	Votes	%	Result
District 1	170,342	50.96%	153,442	45.91%	10,459	3.13%	334,243	100.0%	Democratic gain
District 2	171,446	54.79%	133,287	42.60%	8,180	2.61%	312,913	100%	Democratic hold
District 3	175,642	49.30%	167,933	47.14%	12,666	3.56%	356,241	100.0%	Democratic gain
District 4	147,246	47.04%	157,676	50.37%	8,123	2.59%	313,045	100.0%	Republican hold
Total	664,676	50.49%	612,338	46.51%	39,428	3.00%	1,316,442	100.0%	

== District 1 ==
2018 Iowa's 1st congressional district election
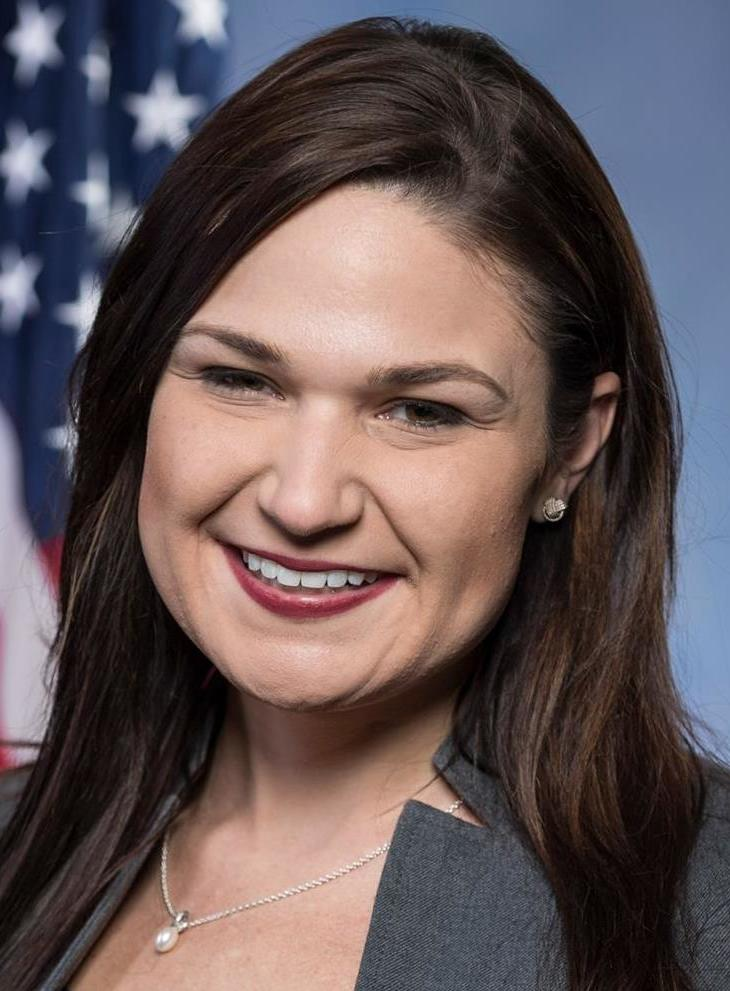

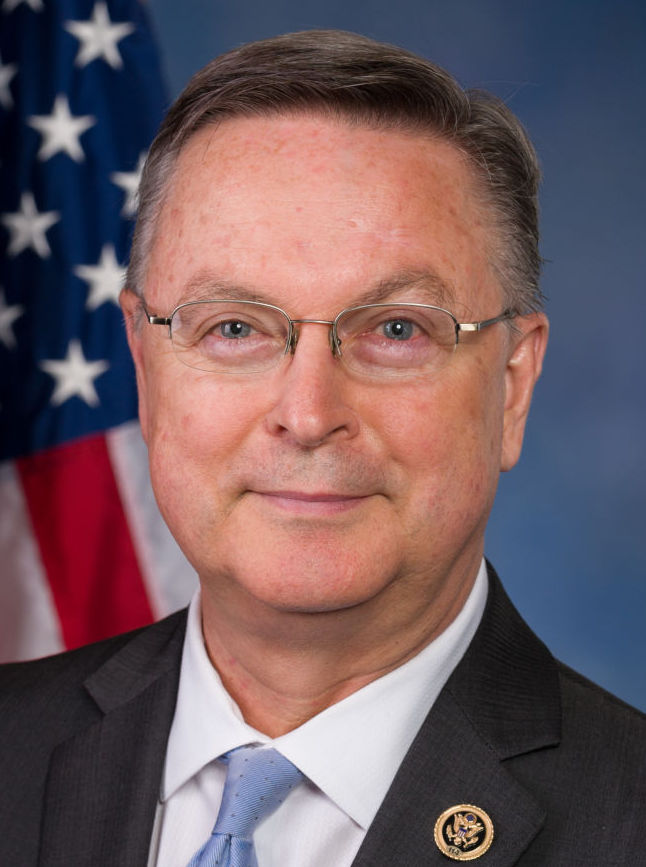
Nominee	Abby Finkenauer	Rod Blum
Party	Democratic	Republican
Popular vote	170,342	153,442
Percentage	51.0%	45.9%
- County results Finkenauer: 50–60% Blum: 40–50% 50–60%
U.S. Representative before election
Rod Blum
Republican
Elected U.S. Representative
Abby Finkenauer
Democratic

Incumbent Republican Rod Blum, who had represented the district since 2015, ran for re-election. He was re-elected with 54% of the vote in 2016. The district had a PVI of D+1.

The 1st district went for Donald Trump in the 2016 presidential election with a 49% to 45% margin, after voting for Barack Obama with a 56% to 43% margin in 2012.

=== Republican primary ===
==== Candidates ====
===== Nominee =====
- Rod Blum, incumbent U.S. Representative

==== Results ====
2018 Iowa's 1st congressional district Republican primary results by county: Map legend: Blum—100%; Blum—≥90%

Republican primary results
Party	Candidate	Votes	%
Republican	Rod Blum (incumbent)	14,737	98.9
Republican	Write-ins	167	1.1
Total votes		14,904	100.0

=== Democratic primary ===
==== Candidates ====
===== Nominee =====
- Abby Finkenauer, state representative

===== Eliminated in primary =====
- Thomas Heckroth, former staffer for United States Senator Tom Harkin
- George Ramsey III, former military recruiter
- Courtney Rowe, engineer and Bernie Sanders delegate at the 2016 state convention

===== Declined =====
- Jeff Danielson, state senator
- Liz Mathis, state senator
- Brent Oleson, Linn County Supervisor
- Steve Sodders, former state senator
- Stacey Walker, Linn County Supervisor

==== Endorsements ====
Abby Finkenauer

State legislators

- Ako Abdul-Samad, state representative
- Liz Bennett, state representative
- Timi Brown-Powers, state representative
- Pam Jochum, State Senator and former President of the Iowa Senate
- Tyler Olson, former state representative
- Janet Petersen, state senator
- Kirsten Running-Marquardt, state representative
- Ras Smith, state representative
- Todd Taylor, state representative

Individuals

- Sue Dvorsky, former Iowa Democratic Party chair
Thomas Heckroth

State legislators

- Ro Foege, former state representative
- Brian Schoenjahn, former state senator
- Steve Sodders, former state senator

Individuals

- Brent Oleson, Linn County Supervisor
- Peggy Sherets, Oelwein mayor
Courtney Rowe

Organizations

- Justice Democrats

==== Results ====
2018 Iowa's 1st congressional district Democratic primary results by county: Map legend: Finkenauer—80–90%; Finkenauer—70–80%; Finkenauer—60–70%; Finkenauer—50–60%; Heckroth—50–60%

Democratic primary results
Party	Candidate	Votes	%
Democratic	Abby Finkenauer	29,745	66.8
Democratic	Thomas Heckroth	8,516	19.1
Democratic	Courtney Rowe	3,381	7.6
Democratic	George Ramsey	2,837	6.4
Democratic	Write-ins	50	0.1
Total votes		44,529	100

=== Libertarian primary ===
==== Candidates ====
===== Nominee =====
- Troy Hageman, activist

=== Green primary ===
==== Candidates ====
===== Nominee =====
- Henry Gaff, co-chair of the Iowa Green Party

Gaff was only 18, meaning he would not have met the U.S. Constitution's required minimum age of 25 to be elected to the House of Representatives.

=== General election ===
==== Debates ====
2018 Iowa's 1st congressional district debates
No.	Date	Host	Moderator	Link	Republican	Democratic
Key: P Participant A Absent N Not invited I Invited W Withdrawn						
Key: P Participant A Absent N Not invited I Invited W Withdrawn					Rod Blum	Abby Finkenauer
1	October 5, 2018	KWWL-TV	Ron Steele; Abby Turpin		P	P
2	October 16, 2018	KGAN; KXEL	Jeff Stein; Nick Weig		P	P

==== Polling ====
Poll source	Date(s) administered	Sample size	Margin of error	Rod Blum (R)	Abby Finkenauer (D)	Troy Hageman (L)	Undecided
Emerson College	October 29 – November 1, 2018	353	± 5.5%	41%	53%	4%	2%
NYT Upshot/Siena College	October 28–31, 2018	452	± 4.9%	39%	46%	4%	11%
The Polling Company (R-Blum)	October 12–13, 2018	400	± 4.9%	43%	45%	4%	6%
The Polling Company (R-Blum)	October 3–4, 2018	400	± 4.9%	43%	44%	3%	8%
NYT Upshot/Siena College	September 18–20, 2018	502	± 4.6%	37%	52%	–	11%
Emerson College	September 6–8, 2018	250	± 6.4%	38%	43%	–	12%
DCCC (D)	February 13–14, 2018	—	—	41%	47%	–	—
Public Policy Polling (D)	February 12–13, 2018	742	± 3.6%	42%	43%	–	15%
Public Policy Polling (D-Heckroth)	November 2–3, 2017	737	–	42%	43%	–	16%
Public Policy Polling (D)	October 6–8, 2017	1,093	± 3.0%	40%	42%	–	18%

==== Predictions ====
Source	Ranking	As of
The Cook Political Report	Lean D (flip)	November 5, 2018
Inside Elections	Lean D (flip)	November 5, 2018
Sabato's Crystal Ball	Lean D (flip)	November 5, 2018
RCP	Lean D (flip)	November 5, 2018
Daily Kos	Lean D (flip)	November 5, 2018
538	Safe D (flip)	November 7, 2018
CNN	Lean D (flip)	October 31, 2018
Fox News	Lean D (flip)	September 21, 2018
Politico	Lean D (flip)	November 2, 2018

==== Results ====
Finkenauer went on to flip the district; this was one of many victories in swing districts for Democrats in a blue wave election.

Iowa's 1st congressional district, 2018
Party	Candidate	Votes	%
Democratic	Abby Finkenauer	170,342	51.0
Republican	Rod Blum (incumbent)	153,442	45.9
Libertarian	Troy Hageman	10,285	3.1
Write-in		174	0.0
Total votes		334,243	100.0
Democratic gain from Republican			

== District 2 ==
2018 Iowa's 2nd congressional district election
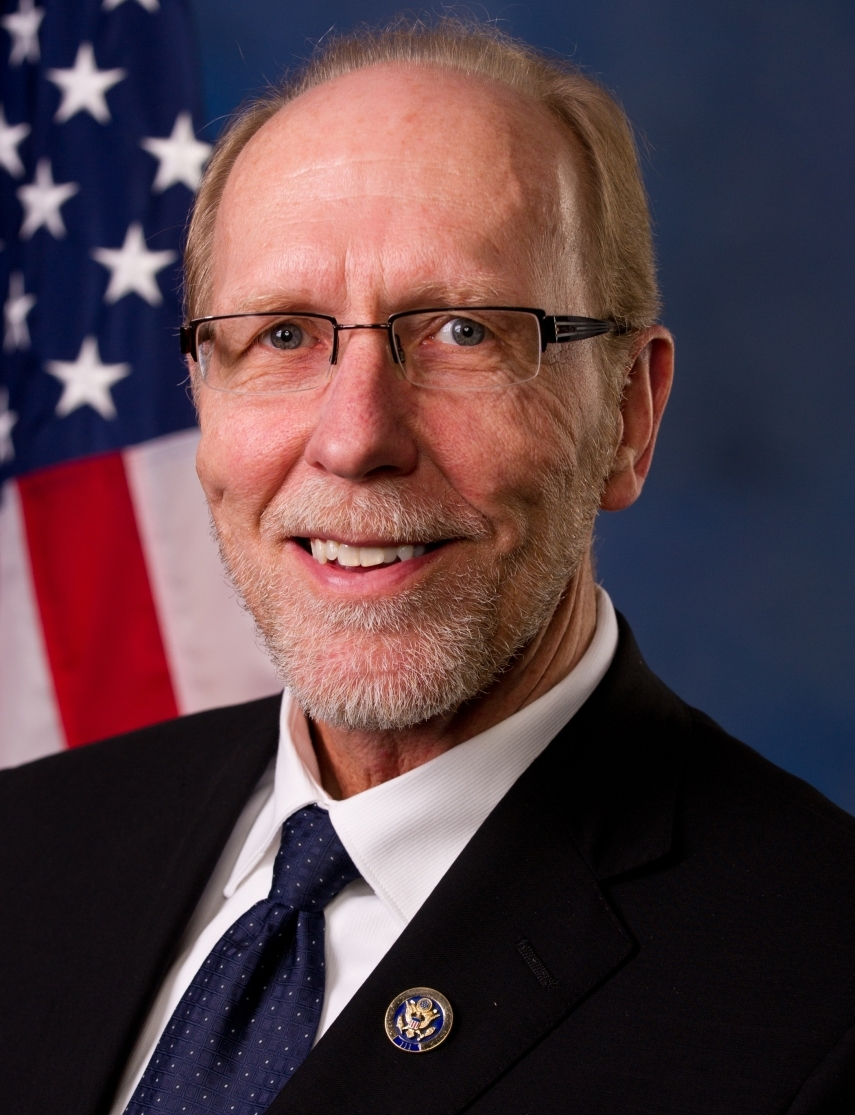

Nominee	Dave Loebsack	Christopher Peters
Party	Democratic	Republican
Popular vote	171,446	133,287
Percentage	54.8%	42.6%
- County results Loebsack: 50–60% 70–80% Peters: 40–50% 50–60% 60–70%
U.S. Representative before election
Dave Loebsack
Democratic
Elected U.S. Representative
Dave Loebsack
Democratic

Democratic representative Dave Loebsack, who had represented the district since 2007, was reelected to a sixth term with 54% of the vote in 2016. Loebsack ran for reelection.

The 2nd district went for Donald Trump in the 2016 presidential election with a 49% to 45% margin, after voting for Barack Obama with a 56% to 43% margin in 2012.

=== Democratic primary ===
==== Candidates ====
===== Nominee =====
- Dave Loebsack, incumbent U.S. Representative

==== Results ====
2018 Iowa's 2nd congressional district Democratic primary results by county: Map legend: Loebsack—100%; Loebsack—≥90%

Democratic primary results
Party	Candidate	Votes	%
Democratic	Dave Loebsack (incumbent)	42,378	99.3
Democratic	Write-ins	314	0.7
Total votes		42,692	100.0

=== Republican primary ===
==== Candidates ====
===== Nominee =====
- Christopher Peters, thoracic surgeon and nominee for this seat in 2016

===== Eliminated in primary =====
- Ginny Caligiuri, businesswoman (write-in)

===== Declined =====
- Bobby Kaufmann, state representative

==== Results ====
2018 Iowa's 2nd congressional district Republican primary results by county: Map legend: Peters—≥90%; Peters—80–90%; Peters—70–80%; Peters—50–60%

Republican primary results
Party	Candidate	Votes	%
Republican	Christopher Peters	18,056	85.7
Republican	Ginny Caligiuri (write-in)	2,839	13.5
Republican	Other write-ins	181	0.9
Total votes		21,076	100.0

=== Independents ===
- Daniel Clark

=== General election ===
==== Polling ====
Poll source	Dates administered	Sample size	Margin of error	Dave Loebsack (D)	Christopher Peters (R)	Other	Undecided
Emerson College	October 29 – November 1, 2018	373	± 5.3%	53%	40%	2%	5%
Gravis Marketing (R-Peters)	September 8–11, 2018	425	± 4.8%	46%	38%	–	16%
Gravis Marketing (R-Peters)	September 8–11, 2018	425	± 4.8%	43%	37%	3%	17%
Emerson College	September 6–8, 2018	250	± 6.4%	45%	21%	–	28%

==== Predictions ====
Source	Ranking	As of
The Cook Political Report	Safe D	November 5, 2018
Inside Elections	Safe D	November 5, 2018
Sabato's Crystal Ball	Safe D	November 5, 2018
RCP	Likely D	November 5, 2018
Daily Kos	Safe D	November 5, 2018
538	Safe D	November 7, 2018
Fox News	Likely D	September 28, 2018
CNN	Safe D	October 31, 2018
Politico	Likely D	November 2, 2018

==== Results ====
Iowa's 2nd congressional district, 2018
Party	Candidate	Votes	%
Democratic	Dave Loebsack (incumbent)	171,446	54.8
Republican	Christopher Peters	133,287	42.6
Libertarian	Mark Strauss	6,181	2.0
Independent	Daniel Clark	1,837	0.6
Write-in		162	0.0
Total votes		312,913	100.0
Democratic hold			

== District 3 ==
2018 Iowa's 3rd congressional district election
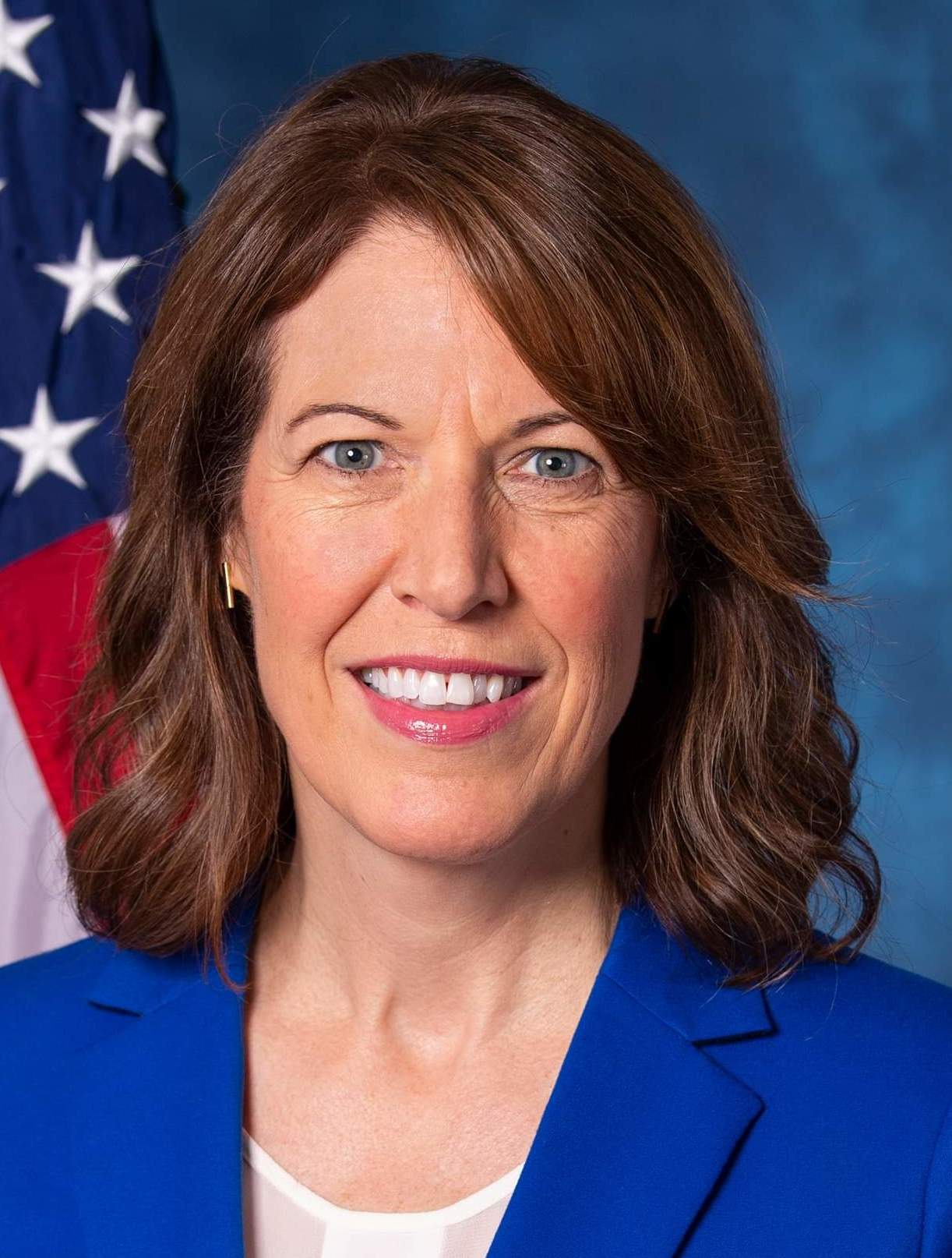

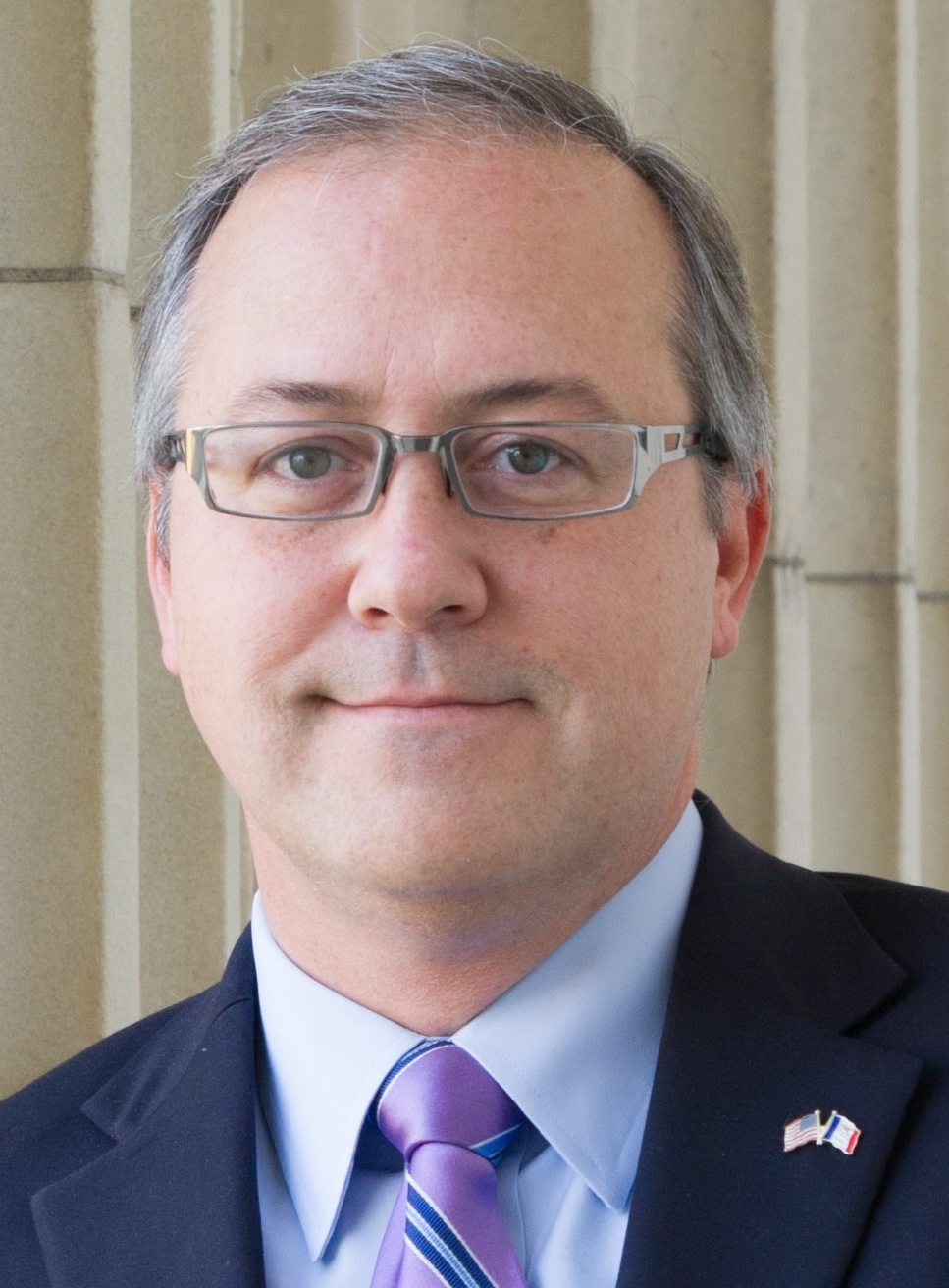
Nominee	Cindy Axne	David Young
Party	Democratic	Republican
Popular vote	175,642	167,933
Percentage	49.3%	47.1%
- County results Axne: 50–60% Young: 50–60% 60–70%
U.S. Representative before election
David Young
Republican
Elected U.S. Representative
Cindy Axne
Democratic

Incumbent Republican David Young, who had represented the district since 2015, ran for re-election. He was re-elected with 53% of the vote in 2016. The district had a PVI of D+1.

The 3rd district went for Donald Trump in the 2016 presidential election with a 49% to 45% margin, after voting for Barack Obama with a 51% to 47% margin in 2012.

=== Republican primary ===
==== Candidates ====
===== Nominee =====
- David Young, incumbent U.S. Representative

==== Results ====
2018 Iowa's 3rd congressional district Republican primary results by county: Map legend: Young—100%; Young—≥90%

Republican primary results
Party	Candidate	Votes	%
Republican	David Young (incumbent)	21,712	98.9
Republican	Write-ins	234	1.1
Total votes		21,946	100

=== Democratic primary ===
After Greenfield's campaign manager was fired for forging signatures on nominating papers, she attempted to re-collect the 1,790 signatures necessary to make the ballot, but did not get enough signatures.

==== Candidates ====
===== Nominee =====
- Cindy Axne, businesswoman

===== Eliminated in primary =====
- Pete D'Alessandro, political consultant
- Eddie Mauro, activist

===== Did not make ballot =====
- Theresa Greenfield, real estate executive

===== Withdrew =====
- Austin Frerick, former Treasury Department economist
- Paul Knupp, psychiatric rehabilitation practitioner and minister, withdrew from the Democratic primary to join the Green party
- Heather Ryan, nominee for KY-01 in 2008
- Anna Ryon, attorney with the Office of Consumer Advocate
- Mike Sherzan, businessman and candidate in 2016

Declined

- John Norris, former chief of staff to Governor Tom Vilsack, former Federal Energy Regulatory Commission member and nominee for IA-04 in 2002 (running for governor)

==== Endorsements ====
Austin Frerick (withdrawn)

U.S. Representatives

- Ro Khanna, U.S. Representative (CA-17)
Pete D'Alessandro

U.S. Senators

- Bernie Sanders, U.S. Senator from Vermont

State legislators

- Marti Anderson, state representative
- Brian Meyer, state representative

Labor unions

- National Nurses United

Organizations

- Justice Democrats
- Our Revolution
- The People for Bernie Sanders

Individuals

- Sue Dvorsky, former Iowa Democratic Committee Chair
- Derek Eadon, former Iowa Democratic Committee Chair
- Ben Jacobs, Bernie Sanders’s 2016 campaign manager

==== Polling ====
Poll source	Dates administered	Sample size	Margin of error	Cindy Axne	Pete D'Alessandro	Eddie Mauro	Undecided
Selzer & Co.	May 13–16, 2018	400	± 4.9%	26%	11%	27%	36%

==== Results ====
2018 Iowa's 3rd congressional district Democratic primary results by county: Map legend: Axne—70–80%; Axne—60–70%; Axne—50–60%; Mauro—40–50%

Democratic primary results
Party	Candidate	Votes	%
Democratic	Cindy Axne	32,910	57.8
Democratic	Eddie J. Mauro	15,006	26.4
Democratic	Pete D'Alessandro	8,874	15.6
Democratic	Write-ins	150	0.3
Total votes		56,940	100

=== General election ===
==== Debate ====
2018 Iowa's 3rd congressional district debates
No.	Date	Host	Moderator	Link	Republican	Democratic
Key: P Participant A Absent N Not invited I Invited W Withdrawn						
Key: P Participant A Absent N Not invited I Invited W Withdrawn					David Young	Cindy Axne
1	October 11, 2018	Iowa Public Television	David Yepsen		P	P

==== Polling ====
Poll source	Dates administered	Sample size	Margin of error	David Young (R)	Cindy Axne (D)	Undecided
Emerson College	October 29 – November 1, 2018	380	± 5.3%	45%	46%	3%
NYT Upshot/Siena College	October 25–27, 2018	504	± 4.6%	41%	43%	11%
NYT Upshot/Siena College	September 27–30, 2018	502	± 4.6%	43%	44%	13%
Emerson College	September 6–8, 2018	260	± 6.4%	47%	31%	15%
DCCC (D)	September 4–5, 2018	575	± 4.1%	43%	46%	11%
ALG Research (D-Axne)	July 8–12, 2018	500	± 4.4%	41%	45%	14%

Hypothetical polling

Poll source	Dates administered	Sample size	Margin of error	David Young (R)	Democratic candidate	Other	Undecided
PPP/Patriot Majority USA	October 6–8, 2017	693	± 3.7%	44%	43%	—	—

==== Predictions ====
Source	Ranking	As of
The Cook Political Report	Tossup	November 5, 2018
Inside Elections	Tossup	November 5, 2018
Sabato's Crystal Ball	Lean D (flip)	November 5, 2018
RCP	Tossup	November 5, 2018
Daily Kos	Tossup	November 5, 2018
538	Lean D (flip)	November 7, 2018
CNN	Tossup	October 31, 2018
Fox News	Tossup	September 21, 2018
Politico	Tossup	November 2, 2018

==== Results ====
Iowa's 3rd congressional district, 2018
Party	Candidate	Votes	%
Democratic	Cindy Axne	175,642	49.3
Republican	David Young (incumbent)	167,933	47.1
Libertarian	Bryan Holder	7,267	2.0
Legal Marijuana Now	Mark Elworth Jr.	2,015	0.6
Green	Paul Knupp	1,888	0.5
Independent	Joe Grandanette	1,301	0.4
Write-in		195	0.1
Total votes		356,241	100.0
Democratic gain from Republican			

== District 4 ==
2018 Iowa's 4th congressional district election
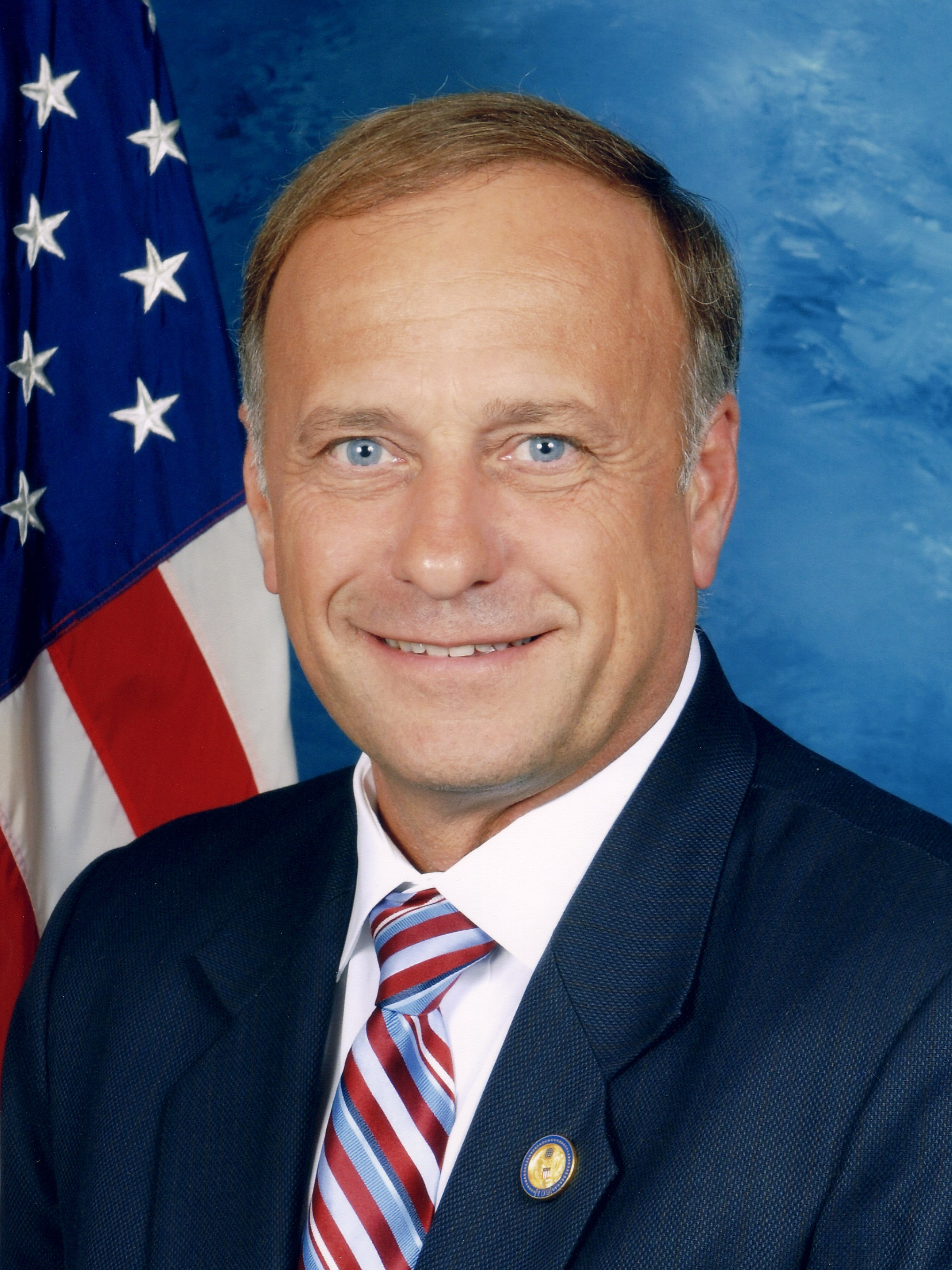

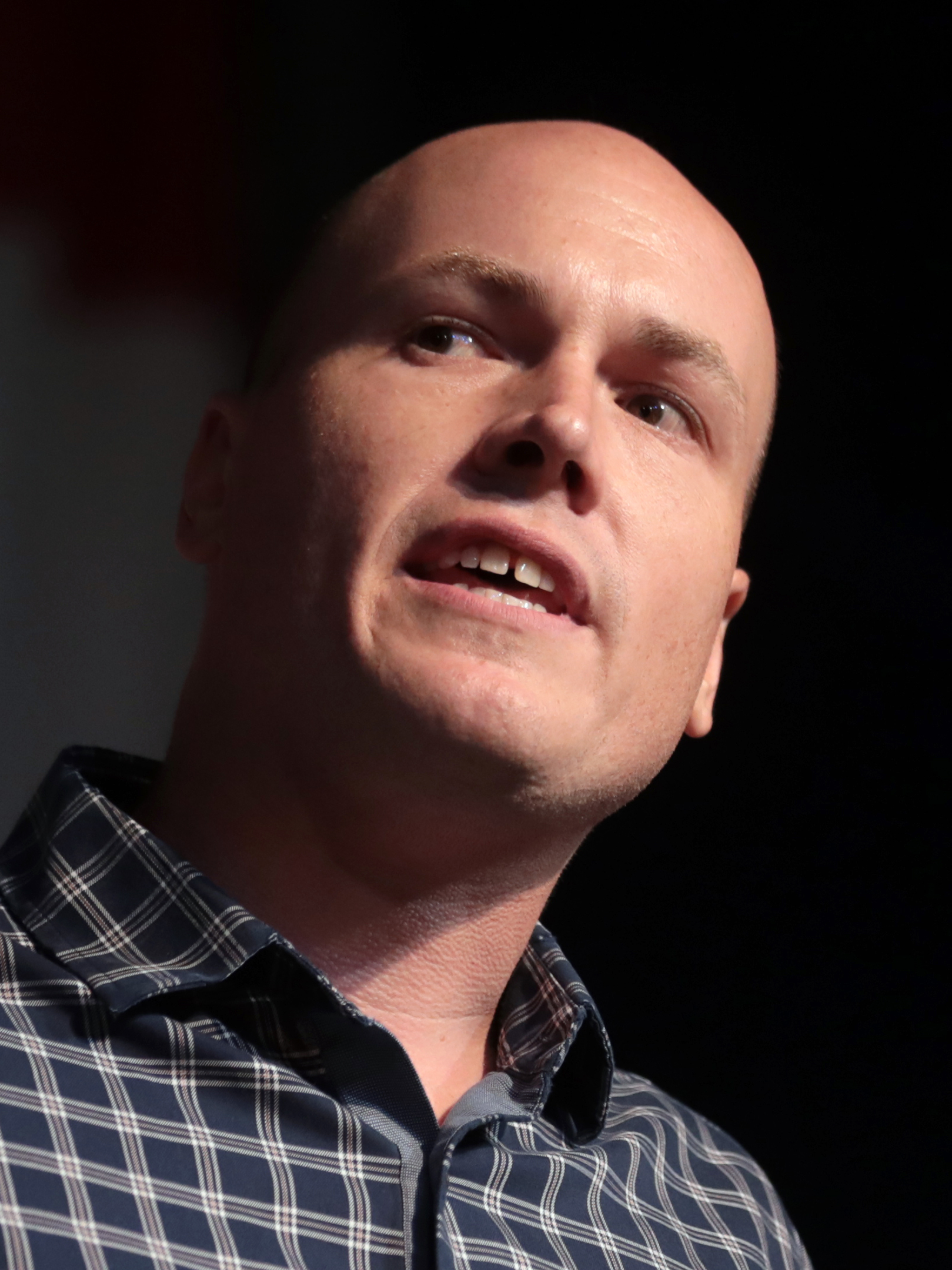
Nominee	Steve King	J. D. Scholten
Party	Republican	Democratic
Popular vote	157,676	147,246
Percentage	50.3%	47.0%
- County results King: 40–50% 50–60% 60–70% 70–80% Scholten: 40–50% 50–60% 60–70%
U.S. Representative before election
Steve King
Republican
Elected U.S. Representative
Steve King
Republican

Incumbent Republican Steve King, who had represented the district since 2013, and previously represented the 5th district from 2003 to 2013, ran for re-election. He was re-elected with 61% of the vote in 2016. The district had a PVI of R+11.

The 4th district went for Donald Trump in the 2016 presidential election with a 61% to 34% margin, after voting for Mitt Romney with a 53% to 45% margin in 2012.

=== Republican primary ===
==== Candidates ====
===== Nominee =====
- Steve King, incumbent U.S. Representative

===== Eliminated in primary =====
- Cyndi Hanson, educational administrator

===== Declined =====
- Rick Bertrand, state senator and candidate for this seat in 2016

==== Results ====
2018 Iowa's 4th congressional district Republican primary results by county: Map legend: King—80–90%; King—70–80%; King—60–70%

Republican primary results
Party	Candidate	Votes	%
Republican	Steve King (incumbent)	28,053	74.7
Republican	Cyndi Hanson	9,437	25.1
Republican	Write-ins	44	0.1
Total votes		37,534	100

=== Democratic primary ===
==== Candidates ====
===== Nominee =====
- J. D. Scholten, paralegal and former professional baseball player

===== Eliminated in primary =====
- Leann Jacobsen, Spencer City Councilwoman
- John Paschen, physician

===== Withdrawn =====
- Paul Dahl, candidate for Governor in 2014
- Kim Weaver, nominee in 2016

===== Declined =====
- Dirk Deam, Iowa State University political science professor
- Chris Hall, state representative

==== Results ====
2018 Iowa's 4th congressional district Democratic primary results by county: Map legend: Scholten—70–80%; Scholten—60–70%; Scholten—50–60%; Scholten—40–50%; Scholten—30–40%; Jacobsen—40–50%; Jacobsen—50–60%; Jacobsen—60–70%

Democratic primary results
Party	Candidate	Votes	%
Democratic	J. D. Scholten	14,733	51.3
Democratic	Leann Jacobsen	9,176	31.9
Democratic	John Paschen	4,806	16.7
Democratic	Write-ins	29	0.1
Total votes		28,744	100.0

=== General election ===
King declined to debate Scholten during the general election campaign.

==== Endorsements ====
J. D. Scholten (D)

U.S. senators

- Jeff Flake, Arizona (2013–2019) (Republican)

==== Polling ====
Poll source	Dates administered	Sample size	Margin of error	Steve King (R)	J.D. Scholten (D)	Other	Undecided
NYT Upshot/Siena College	October 31 – November 4, 2018	423	± 5.0%	47%	42%	1%	9%
Emerson College	October 29 – November 1, 2018	356	± 5.5%	51%	42%	–	4%
Change Research (D)	October 27–29, 2018	631	–	45%	44%	–	–
WPA Intelligence (R-King)	October 22–24, 2018	401	± 4.9%	52%	34%	3%	11%
Expedition Strategies (D-Scholten)	September 5–9, 2018	380	± 5.0%	43%	37%	–	–
Emerson College	September 6–8, 2018	240	± 6.5%	41%	31%	–	16%

==== Predictions ====
Source	Ranking	As of
The Cook Political Report	Lean R	November 5, 2018
Inside Elections	Likely R	November 5, 2018
Sabato's Crystal Ball	Lean R	November 5, 2018
RCP	Lean R	November 5, 2018
Daily Kos	Likely R	November 5, 2018
538	Likely R	November 7, 2018
Fox News	Lean R	September 21, 2018
CNN	Likely R	October 31, 2018
Politico	Likely R	November 2, 2018

==== Results ====
King won by the slimmest margin of victory in his congressional electoral career.

Iowa's 4th congressional district, 2018
Party	Candidate	Votes	%
Republican	Steve King (incumbent)	157,676	50.3
Democratic	J. D. Scholten	147,246	47.0
Libertarian	Charles Aldrich	6,161	2.0
Independent	Edward Peterson	1,962	0.6
Write-in		206	0.0
Total votes		313,256	100.0
Republican hold			
