= Iowa's 28th House of Representatives district =

American legislative district

House District 28
- Type: District of the Lower house
- Location: Iowa
- Representative: David Young
- Parent organization: Iowa General Assembly

The 28th District of the Iowa House of Representatives in the state of Iowa. It is currently composed of part of Dallas County.

== Current elected officials ==
David Young is the representative currently representing the district.

== Past representatives ==
The district has previously been represented by:

- Charles E. Knoblauch, 1971–1973
- Wally Horn, 1973–1983
- Donald Avenson, 1983–1991
- Charles D. Hurley, 1991–1997
- Steven L. Falck, 1997–2002
- Jackie Reeder, 2002–2003
- Pat Murphy, 2003–2013
- Greg Heartsill, 2013–2019
- Jon Thorup, 2019–2023
- David Young 2023–2027
- Tom Walton 2027–Present
