= David Young (Iowa politician) =

American politician (born 1968)

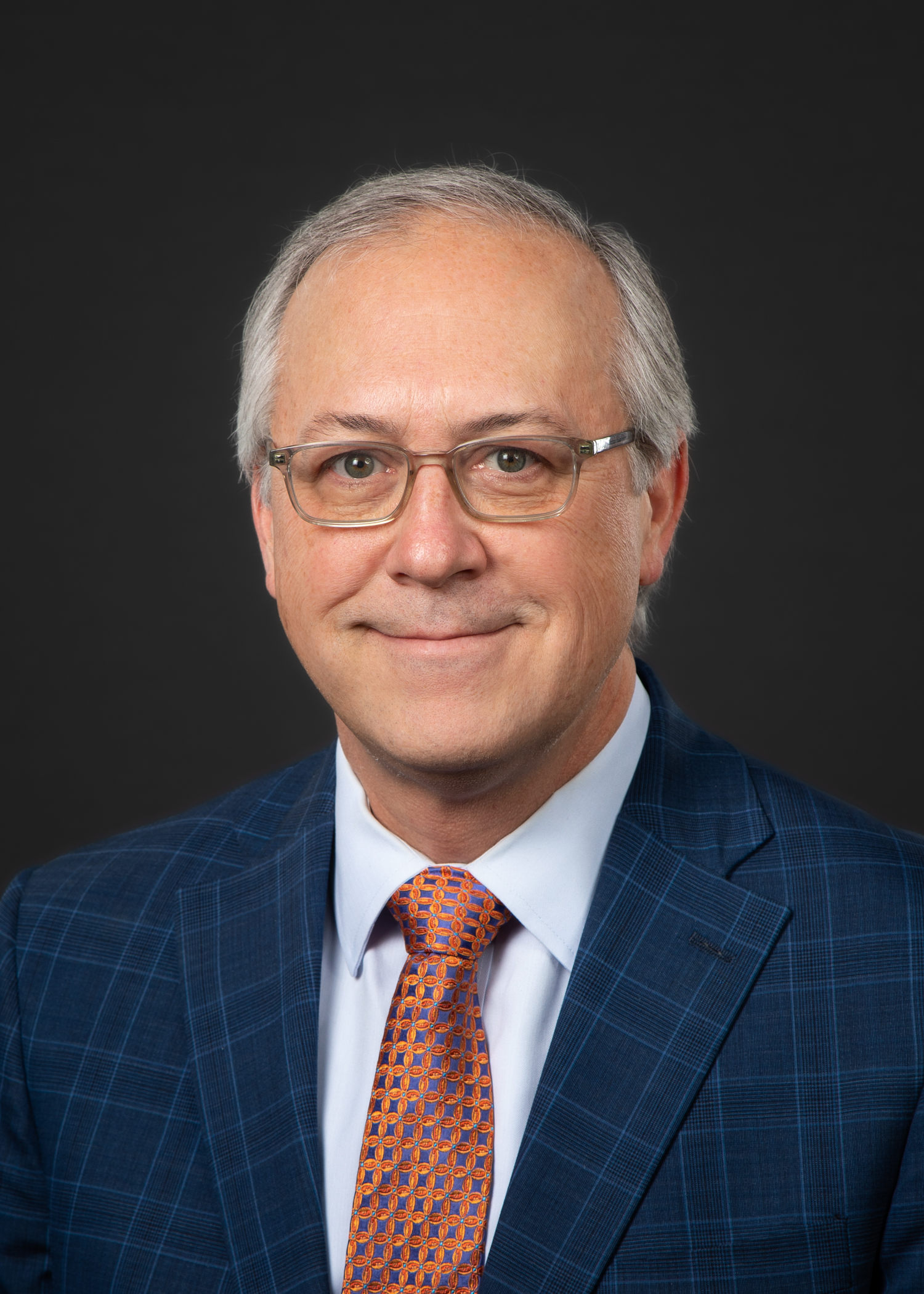
- Official portrait, 2023

Member of the Iowa House of Representatives from the 28th district
- Incumbent
- Assumed office January 9, 2023
- Preceded by: Redistricted
- Succeeded by: Tom Walton (elect)

Member of the U.S. House of Representatives from Iowa's 3rd district
- In office January 3, 2015 – January 3, 2019
- Preceded by: Tom Latham
- Succeeded by: Cindy Axne

Personal details
- Born: David Edmund Young; May 11, 1968 (age 58) Van Meter, Iowa, U.S.
- Party: Republican
- Education: Drake University (BA)

David Edmund Young (born May 11, 1968) is an American politician who currently serves as a member of the Iowa House of Representatives from the 28th district, and previously served as the U.S. representative for Iowa's 3rd congressional district from 2015 to 2019. A member of the Republican Party, he is a native and resident of Van Meter, a western suburb of Des Moines. He was first elected in 2014 and reelected in 2016; he lost reelection in 2018 to Democrat Cindy Axne. Young unsuccessfully challenged Axne in 2020 in a rematch, losing by 1.3%.

Young was elected to the Iowa House of Representatives in 2022. He represents parts of Dallas County, including western suburbs of Des Moines.

== Early life and education ==
Young was born in Des Moines, Iowa and raised in Van Meter. He earned a Bachelor of Arts degree in English from Drake University.

== Early career ==
Young first worked as a legislative assistant to Colorado senator Hank Brown from 1993 to 1996. He was then chief of staff to Kentucky senator Jim Bunning from 1998 to 2006, and later served from 2006 to 2013 as the chief of staff to Iowa senator Chuck Grassley.

== U.S. House of Representatives ==
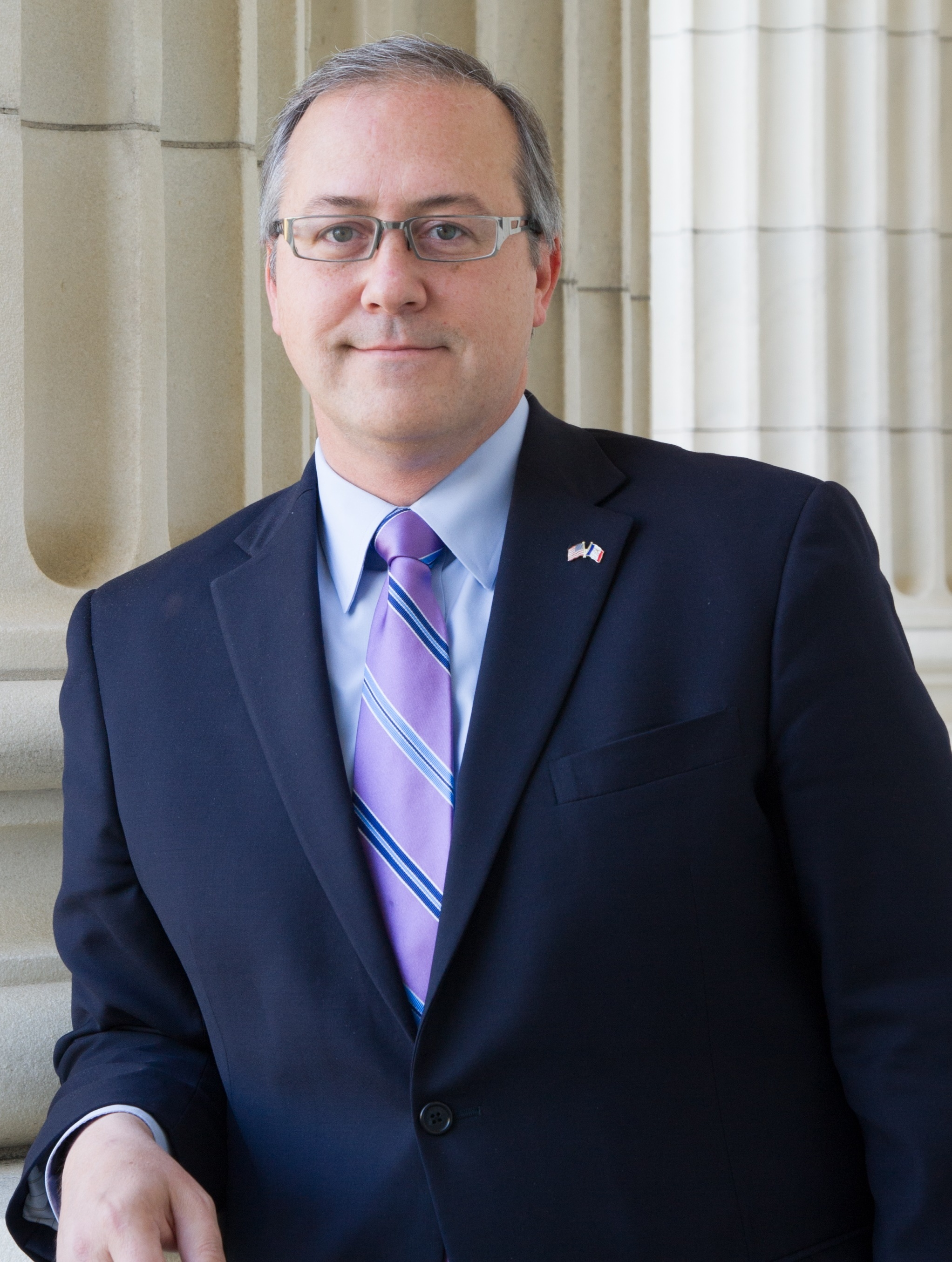
Young's official congressional portrait

=== Elections ===
==== 2014 ====
The Republican nomination was decided by a convention after none of the six candidates reached the 35 percent threshold required to make the general election ballot. This was the second time in 50 years that a convention picked a nominee and the first time since 2002. A poll conducted by the conservative website Caffeinated Thoughts of 118 of the 513 delegates was conducted on June 9–10, 2014. Young and Brad Zaun took 27% each.

On June 21, 2014, in what was described by the Des Moines Register as a "stunning upset", Young won the nomination on the fifth ballot of the convention. Young went on to defeat Democrat Staci Appel 53% to 42% in the 2014 general election.

==== 2016 ====
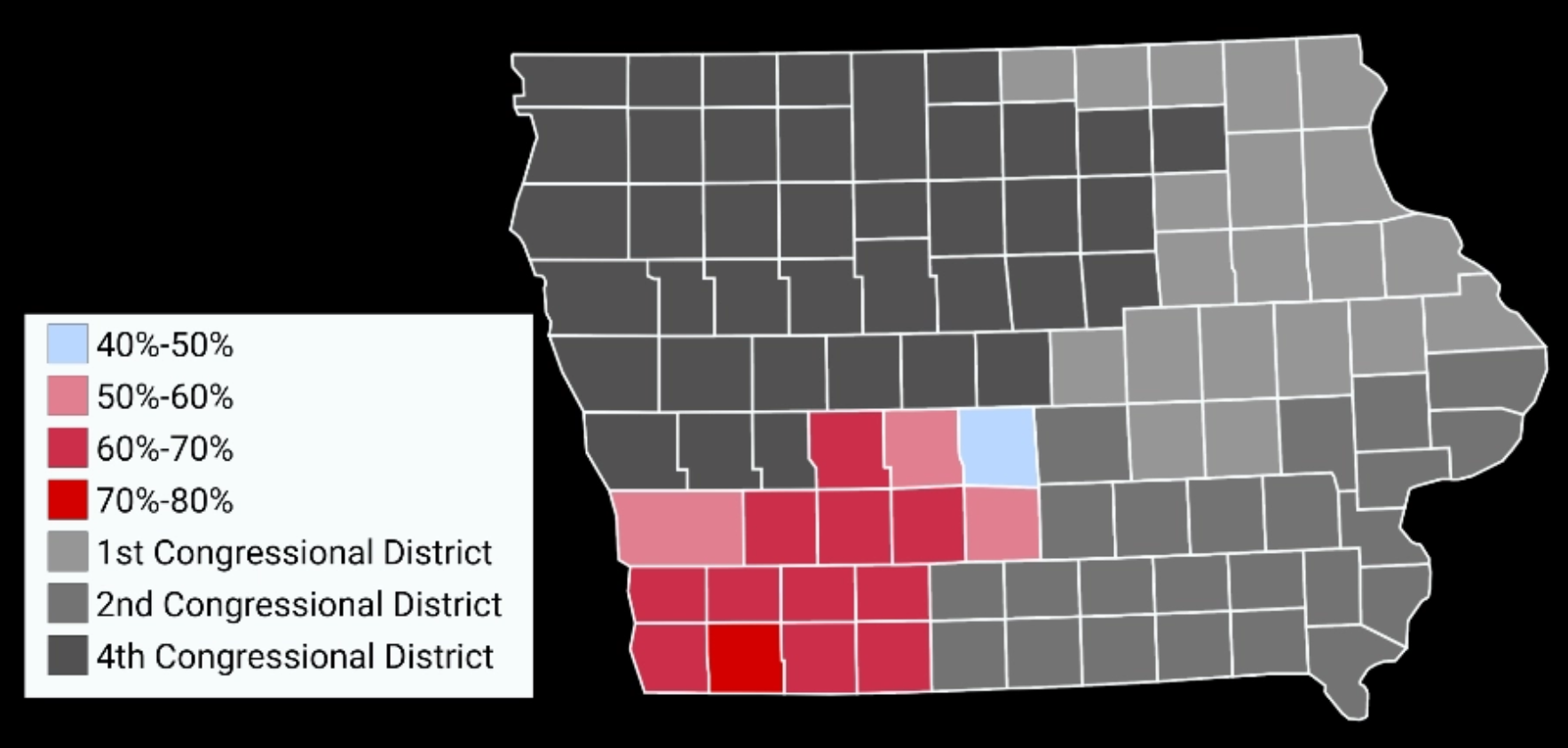
Map showing the results of the 2016 election in Iowa's Third congressional district by County

Young ran for re-election in 2016. He defeated Joe Grandanette in the Republican primary, which took place on June 7, 2016. He then defeated Democrat Jim Mowrer in the general election, winning 54% of the vote.

==== 2018 ====
Young ran for reelection in 2018. He was unopposed in the Republican Party primary. In the November 2018 general election, he was defeated by Democrat Cindy Axne of nearby West Des Moines. Axne won 49% of the vote to Young's 47.5%, with four different third-party candidates winning the remaining 3.5% of the vote. He won 15 of the district's 16 counties, but could not overcome a deficit of over 30,000 votes in the district's most populous county of Polk.

==== 2020 ====
Young attempted to Reclaim his seat two years later. He easily defeated Bill Schafer For the Republican nomination, but in the general election he was again defeated by Axne, receiving 48% of the vote to Axne’s 49%.

=== Tenure ===
Young was sworn into office on January 3, 2015.

He was a member of the Republican Main Street Partnership and the Veterinary Medicine Caucus.

In April 2015, Young joined the Southwest Iowa Housing Trust Fund to announce over $530,000 in affordable housing grants from the Federal Home Loan Bank of Des Moines (FHLB Des Moines) Strong Communities Fund. The grants would assist nearly 100 residents with key home repairs.

During the January 2018 government shutdown, Young remained in Washington, canceled town hall meetings, and, in solidarity with government employees who were going unpaid during the shutdown, refused to accept his own salary. “I'm disappointed and I can't believe that Congress is getting paid during this time right now,” he said. “The people working hard every day in the military, for our federal government, should not be blamed for this.”

=== Committee assignments ===
- Committee on Appropriations
  - Subcommittee on Agriculture, Rural Development, Food and Drug Administration, and Related Agencies
  - Subcommittee on Homeland Security
  - Subcommittee on Transportation, Housing and Urban Development, and Related Agencies

== Iowa State Representative ==
In February 2022, Young said that he was contesting the 28th district seat in the Iowa House of Representatives. He won the election and took his seat on January 9, 2023. Young was reelected in 2024 and served through the end of the 2026 legislative session. Young lost his seat to Democrat Tom Walton, in the 2026 election.

== Political positions ==
=== LGBT issues ===
In May 2016, he voted to approve a measure aimed at upholding an executive order that bars discrimination against LGBT employees by federal contractors.

=== Veterans ===
In 2016, Young sponsored the "No Veterans Crisis Line Call Should Go Unanswered Act" aimed at reducing suicides of veterans. The bill passed the U.S. House unanimously.

=== Health care ===
Young voted to repeal the Affordable Care Act (Obamacare) in 2015.

Young opposed the original March 2017 Republican effort to repeal Obamacare. When the effort ended in March 2017 with the withdrawal of the GOP health-care legislation from further consideration, Young praised Trump and the party leaders for this action and called for everyone to join anew in “a thoughtful and deliberate process that takes the time and input to get this right to achieve accessible, affordable quality healthcare for every American.”

Young supported the second 2017 Republican effort to repeal Obamacare. On May 4, 2017, Young voted to repeal the Affordable Care Act. This second repeal effort narrowly passed the House 217-213, but failed in the Senate. The repeal bill that Young voted for would have made it possible for states to allow insurers to raise health care premiums for individuals with preexisting conditions who did not have continuous coverage. At the same time as he sought to repeal the Affordable Care Act, Young pushed for an amendment intended to assist those with preexisting conditions who saw their premiums rise; many health policy analysts have questioned whether it would have succeeded in doing so.

In September 2017, Young supported the refunding of the Children's Health Insurance Program.

=== Tax reform ===
Young supports tax reform and voted in favor of the Tax Cuts and Jobs Act of 2017. He said he believed the bill would provide tax relief to Iowans.

In April 2018, he voted for a Balanced Budget Amendment. In June 2018, Young voted for H.R. 3, the Spending Cuts to Expired and Unnecessary Programs Act, also known as the rescission package.

=== Tariffs ===
In September 2017, Young was part of a six-member bipartisan delegation that traveled to China to discuss agriculture, North Korea, the South China Sea, energy, and cybersecurity with Chinese officials. “The continued potential for growth in exports to China for Iowa’s products is of great importance to job and economic growth for the state,” said Young. In April 2018, Young told an interviewer that while he agreed with President Trump's belief in the need for “regulatory relief and common-sense regulatory reform and tax relief,” he and many of his constituents believe that “tariffs are taxes,” and are therefore “going to hurt consumers, going to hurt employers.”

=== Immigration ===
In January 2018, Young reiterated support for permanent legal status for so-called DREAMers, saying that he would vote for a measure giving them residency while also improving border security. “I want to find a way for those people to be here legally and stay here without fear of deportation,” Young said, but added that he was “not quite there on citizenship” for immigrants covered by DACA. He acknowledged that might support a citizenship guarantee if it was tied to enhanced border security or immigration controls.

=== Foreign policy ===
Young supported the 2017 Shayrat missile strike.

=== Israel ===
Young, a strong supporter of Israel, visited that country in August 2017 to meet with Israeli and Palestinian leaders and to tour the nation. Young stated: “I look forward to further understanding the unique challenges the people of Israel, and the entire region, face as we work to pursue and achieve policies which will provide security and stability in a region where we have long prayed for peace.”

=== Abortion ===
Young opposes using federal funds to pay for abortions. He does not believe Planned Parenthood should receive federal funding. He does "believes in women’s access to healthcare and contraceptives" with the organization relying on outside funding to achieve these ends.

=== Drug policy ===
In 2016, Young co-sponsored the Compassionate Access, Research Expansion, and Respect States Act (CARERS Act). The CARERS Act is a marijuana policy reform which would reschedule cannabis to allow it to be researched and would permit states with medical marijuana programs to operate without federal interference.

== Electoral history ==
=== 2014 ===
2014 Republican primary results
Party	Candidate	Votes	%
Republican	Brad Zaun	10,522	24.7
Republican	Robert Cramer	9,032	21.2
Republican	Matt Schultz	8,464	19.9
Republican	Monte Shaw	7,220	17.0
Republican	David Young	6,604	15.5
Republican	Joe Grandanette	661	1.6
Republican	Write-ins	42	0.1
Total votes		42,545	100

Iowa Republican Convention, 2014
Candidate	Round 1		Round 2		Round 3		Round 4		Round 5	
David Young	86	(16.8%)	81	(15.8%)	102	(19.9%)	171	(33.3%)	276	(53.8%)
Brad Zaun	130	(25.3%)	157	(30.6%)	188	(36.6%)	206	(40.2%)	221	(43.1%)
Monte Shaw	118	(23%)	122	(23.8%)	126	(24.6%)	120	(23.4%)	—	
Matt Schultz	95	(18.5%)	88	(17.2%)	85	(16.6%)	—			
Robert Cramer	75	(14.6%)	60	(11.7%)	—					
Joe Grandanette	7	(1.4%)	2	(0.4%)	—					
Exhausted ballots	2	(0.4%)	3	(0.6%)	12	(2.3%)	16	(3.1%)	16	(3.1%)
Total	513	(100%)	513	(100%)	513	(100%)	513	(100%)	513	(100%)

Iowa's 3rd congressional district general election, 2014
Party	Candidate	Votes	%
Republican	David Young	148,814	52.8
Democratic	Staci Appel	119,109	42.2
Libertarian	Edward Wright	9,054	3.2
No party preference	Bryan Jack Holder	4,360	1.5
Write-ins		729	0.3
Total votes		282,066	100
Republican hold			

=== 2016 ===
2016 Republican primary results
Party	Candidate	Votes	%
Republican	David Young	17,977	85.2
Republican	Joe Grandanette	3,143	14.8
Republican	Write-ins	85	0.1
Total votes		21,143	100

Iowa's 3rd congressional district general election, 2016
Party	Candidate	Votes	%
Republican	David Young (incumbent)	208,240	53.5
Democratic	Jim Mowrer	154,754	39.8
Libertarian	Bryan Jack Holder	15,327	3.9
No party preference	Claudia Addy	6,335	1.6
No party preference	Joe Grandanette	4,511	1.2
Total votes		389,167	100
Republican hold			

=== 2018 ===
2018 Republican primary results
Party	Candidate	Votes	%
Republican	David Young (incumbent)	21,471	98.95
Republican	Write-ins	228	1.05
Total votes		21,699	100

Iowa's 3rd congressional district general election, 2018
Party	Candidate	Votes	%
Democratic	Cindy Axne	175,642	49.3
Republican	David Young (incumbent)	167,933	47.1
Libertarian	Bryan Holder	7,267	2.0
Legal Marijuana Now	Mark Elworth Jr.	2,015	0.6
Green	Paul Knupp	1,888	0.5
Independent	Joe Grandanette	1,301	0.4
n/a	Write-ins	195	0.1
Total votes		356,241	100.0
Democratic gain from Republican			

=== 2020 ===
2020 Republican primary results
Party	Candidate	Votes	%
Republican	David Young	39,103	69.5
Republican	Bill Schafer	16,904	30.1
Republican	Write-ins	227	0.4
Total votes		56,234	100.0

Iowa 3rd congressional district general election, 2020
Party	Candidate	Votes	%
Democratic	Cindy Axne (incumbent)	219,205	48.9
Republican	David Young	212,997	47.6
Libertarian	Brian Jack Holder	15,361	3.4
n/a	Write-ins	384	0.1
Total votes		447,947	100.0
Democratic hold			

== Personal life ==
Young is a non-denominational Christian and lives in Van Meter.

Since 2023, Young has worked as the Practitioner in Residence for the Olson Institute for Public Democracy at Drake University, his alma mater.

U.S. House of Representatives
Preceded by Tom Latham	Member of the U.S. House of Representatives from Iowa's 3rd congressional district 2015–2019	Succeeded by Cindy Axne
U.S. order of precedence (ceremonial)
Preceded by Rod Blum as Former U.S. Representative	Order of precedence of the United States as Former U.S. Representative	Succeeded by Cindy Axne as Former U.S. Representative
