= Heartsill =

Heartsill is both a masculine given name and a surname. Notable people with the name include:

- Heartsill Ragon (1885–1940), American politician and judge
- Greg Heartsill (born 1971), American politician
