= Thomas Walton (disambiguation) =

Thomas Walton was a medieval English politician.

Thomas Walton may also refer to:

- Thomas Walton (pirate), 16th-century British pirate
- Tom Walton (golfer) (1891–1941), English golfer
- Tom Walton (hurler) (1921–1998), Irish hurler
- Tom Walton (Iowa politician)
