= Jackie Reeder =

American politician

Member of the Iowa House of Representatives from the 28th district
- In office January 22, 2002 – January 12, 2003

Personal details
- Born: June 29, 1958 (age 68) Iowa, United States
- Party: Democratic

Jackie J. Reeder (born June 29, 1958) is a politician from the U.S. state of Iowa. A Democrat, she represented the 28th district in the Iowa House of Representatives from 2002 to 2003.

Reeder was born in 1958 in northeastern Iowa, one of ten children. She was a real estate agent; she served as a county supervisor and on the school board. She was elected in a special election on January 22, 2002, to serve the remainder of Steve Falck's term in the 28th district. She served on the appropriations, local government and state government standing committees.
