= 2022 Iowa House of Representatives election =

American state political election

- November 8, 2022

All 100 seats in the Iowa House of Representatives 51 seats needed for a majority
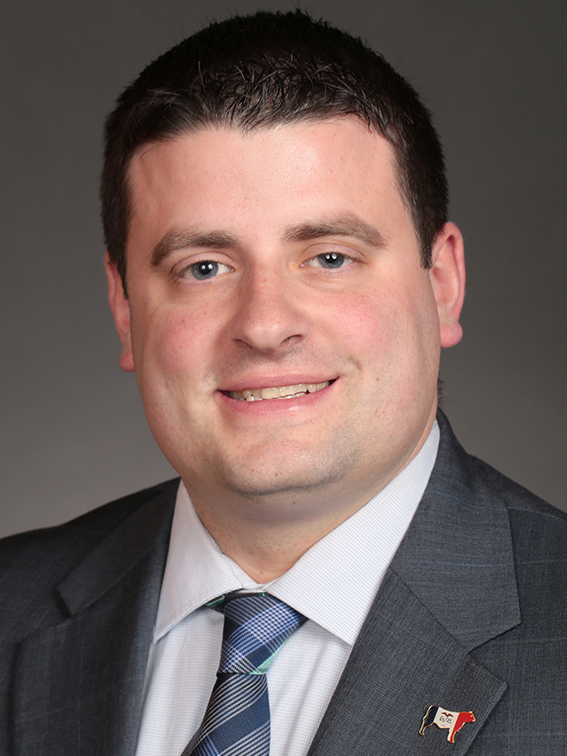

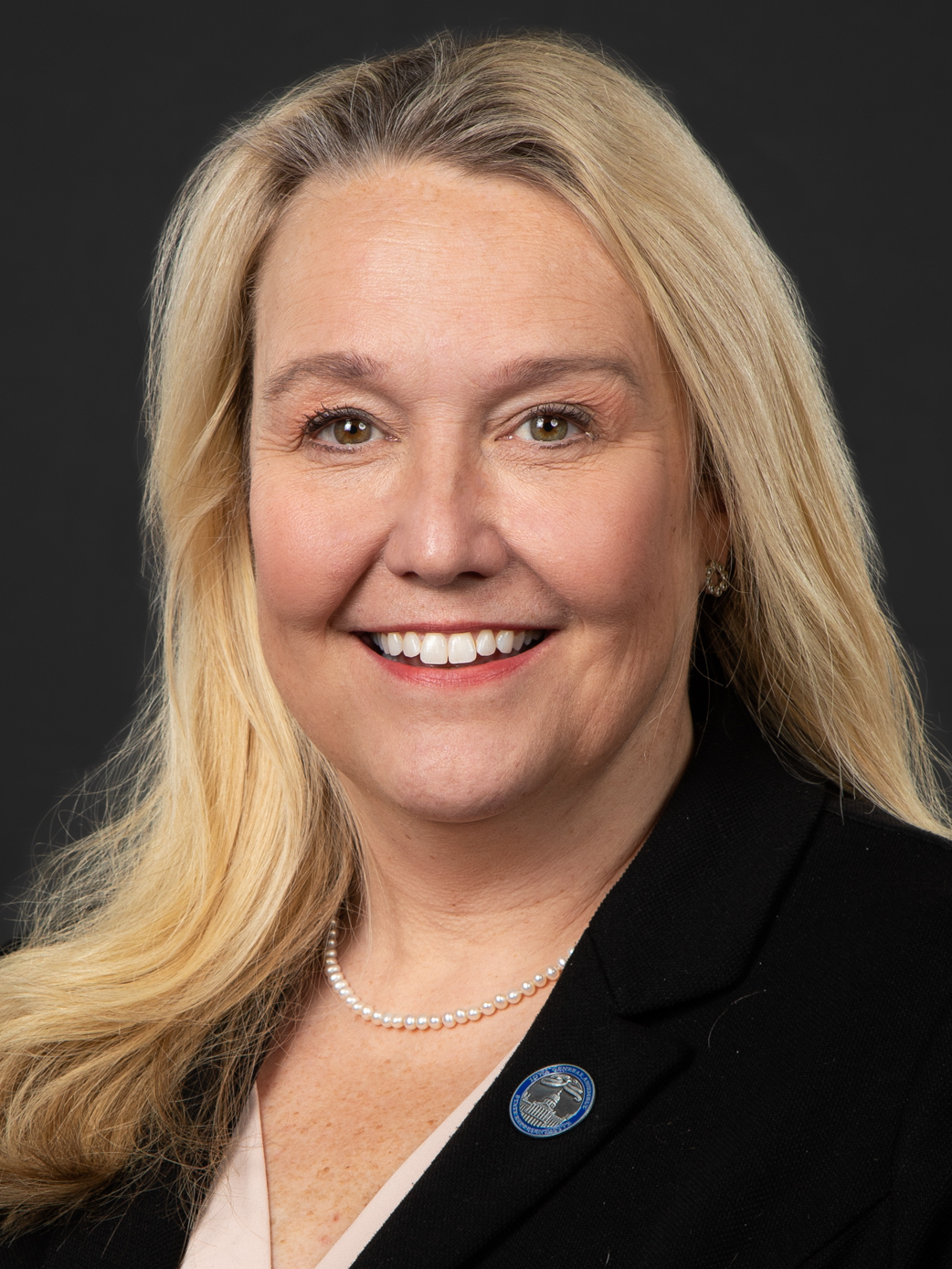
	Majority party	Minority party
Leader	Pat Grassley	Jennifer Konfrst
Party	Republican	Democratic
Leader since	January 13, 2020	June 14, 2019
Leader's seat	50th district	43rd district
Last election	59	41
Seats before	60	40
Seats won	64	36
Seat change	▲4	▼4
Popular vote	629,413	443,603
Percentage	56.59%	39.88%
Swing	▲5.14%	▼7.57%
- Democratic gain Republican gain Democratic hold Republican hold 40–50% 50–60% 60–70% 70–80% 80–90% >90% 40–50% 50–60% 60–70% 70–80% 80–90% >90%
Speaker of the House before election
Pat Grassley
Republican
Elected Speaker of the House
Pat Grassley
Republican

Elections for the Iowa House of Representatives were held on November 8, 2022. This was the first election for the Iowa House using the new legislative maps that were enacted following the 2020 census. Republicans expanded their majority in the chamber after a number of their members were defeated in primaries.

== Background ==
Jon Dunwell picked up the 29th district for the Republicans in a special election.

== Retirements ==
=== Democrats ===
- District 13: Chris Hall retired.
- District 15: Charlie McConkey retired.
- District 34: Bruce Hunter retired.
- District 36: Marti Anderson retired.
- District 41: Jo Oldson retired.
- District 42: Kristin Sunde retired.
- District 52: Todd Prichard retired.
- District 60: Dave Williams retired.
- District 62: Ras Smith retired.
- District 65: Liz Bennett retired to run for state senator from District 39.
- District 68: Molly Donahue retired to run for state senator from District 37.
- District 69: Kirsten Running-Marquardt retired.
- District 85: Christina Bohannan retired to run for U. S. representative from Iowa's 1st congressional district.
- District 86: Mary Mascher retired.
- District 90: Cindy Winckler retired to run for state senator from District 49.
- District 98: Mary Wolfe retired.

=== Republicans ===
- District 8: Terry Baxter retired.
- District 11: Gary Worthan retired.
- District 16: Brent Siegrist was disqualified from renomination.
- District 22: Jon Jacobsen retired.
- District 24: Cecil Dolecheck retired.
- District 37: Mike Bousselot retired to run for state senator from District 21.
- District 48: Robert Bacon retired.
- District 63: Sandy Salmon retired to run for state senator from District 29.
- District 78: Jarad Klein retired.
- District 80: Holly Brink retired.
- District 81: Cherielynn Westrich retired to run for state senator from District 13.
- District 88: David Kerr retired.
- District 92: Ross Paustian retired.
- District 95: Charlie McClintock retired to run for state senator from District 42.

== Incumbents defeated ==
=== In primaries ===
==== Republicans ====
- District 5: Dennis Bush lost renomination to Zach Dieken.
- District 37: Jon Thorup lost renomination to Barb Kniff McCulla.
- District 53: David Maxwell lost renomination to fellow incumbent Dean Fisher in a redistricting race.
- District 66: Lee Hein lost renomination to fellow incumbent Steve Bradley in a redistricting race.
- District 87: Joe Mitchell lost renomination to fellow incumbent Jeff Shipley in a redistricting race.
- District 88: Dustin Hite lost renomination to Helena Hayes.

=== In the general election ===
- District 2: Democrat Steve Hansen lost to Republican Challenger Robert Henderson.
- District 42: Republican Garrett Gobble lost in a rematch against Democratic Challenger Heather Matson, who he had unseated in the previous election.
- District 94: Democrat Phyllis Thede lost to Republican challenger Mike Vondran.
- District 99: Democrat Dennis Cohoon lost to Republican challenger Matthew Rinker.

== Predictions ==
Source	Ranking	As of
Sabato's Crystal Ball	Likely R	May 19, 2022

== Results summary ==
Summary of the November 9, 2022 Iowa House of Representatives election results
Party	Candidates	Votes		Seats				
Party	Candidates	No.	%	Before	Up	Won	After	+/–
Republican	79	629,413	56.59%	59	60	64	64	▲4
Democratic	73	443,603	39.88%	41	40	36	36	▼4
Libertarian	11	21,574	1.94%	0	0	0	0	Steady
Independent	4	7,258	0.65%	0	0	0	0	Steady
Write-in		10,419	0.94%	0	0	0	0	Steady
Total		1,112,267	100.00%	100	100	100	100	Steady
Source: Iowa Elections Results
