= Monica Vernon =

American politician

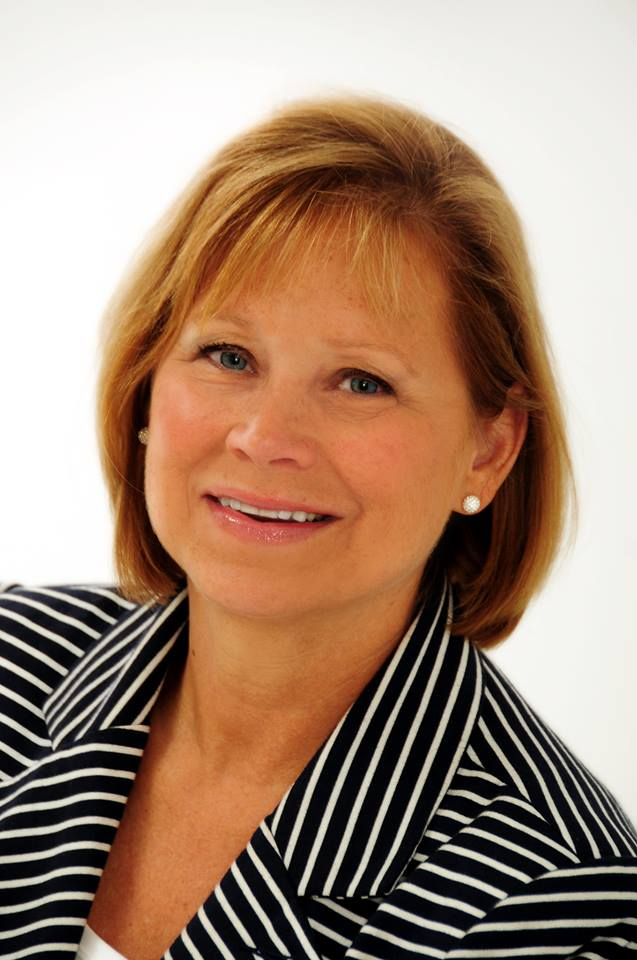

Cedar Rapids City Council, Mayor Pro Tempore
- In office January 3, 2008 – December 2015

Personal details
- Born: Monica Wolf; October 19, 1957 (age 68) Cheyenne, Wyoming, U.S.
- Party: Republican (until 2009); Democratic (2009–present)
- Spouse: Bill Vernon (m. 1984)
- Children: 3
- Education: University of Iowa

Monica Vernon (born October 19, 1957) is an American politician. She is a former two-term member of the Cedar Rapids City Council and the former Mayor Pro Tempore of Cedar Rapids, Iowa.

Vernon was elected to the Cedar Rapids City Council in 2007 as a Republican to represent District 2. In 2009, she switched her party affiliation to the Democratic Party.

In 2014, Vernon was defeated in the Democratic primary election for Iowa's 1st congressional district. That same year, she was an unsuccessful nominee for Lieutenant Governor of Iowa, running alongside Jack Hatch. In 2016, she won the Democratic nomination in Iowa's 1st congressional district. She was defeated by incumbent Republican Rod Blum in the general election.

In 2017, she unsuccessfully ran for mayor of Cedar Rapids.

== Early life and education ==
Vernon was born on the Francis E. Warren Air Force Base in Cheyenne, Wyoming. She graduated from Regis Catholic High School in Cedar Rapids, Iowa.

Vernon attended the University of Iowa and received her B.A. in journalism in 1980. Vernon received her M.B.A. from the Tippie College of Business at the University of Iowa in 1999. She later worked as an adjunct professor at the University of Iowa.

== Private sector career ==
Vernon worked as associate director of college relations at Dickinson State University from 1980 to 1981. She was a reporter for The Gazette from 1981 through 1983. From 1983 through 1985, she was the director of public information for Mount Mercy University. From 1985 through 1987, she was a market research consultant for Frank N. Magid Associates.

In 1987, Vernon founded the Vernon Research Group, a privately owned market research firm. Vernon was the company's president and CEO until it was purchased in 2013 by The Gazette Company.

== Political career ==
=== Cedar Rapids City Council ===
In 2007, Vernon was elected to represent Cedar Rapids' 2nd district on the City Council. In 2009, Vernon switched her party registration to the Democratic Party and supported a one cent local option sales and services tax to help with flood recovery.

After the Iowa flood of 2008, Vernon, as a member of the city council, helped create a post-flood redevelopment map.

=== 2014 elections ===
In the fall of 2013, Vernon announced she was running for Congress in Iowa's 1st congressional district. She came in second behind former Iowa House Speaker Pat Murphy in the five-way primary for the seat vacated by Bruce Braley. That seat was eventually won by Republican Rod Blum.

After that loss, in June 2014, Jack Hatch asked Vernon to join him on the Democratic ticket as his lieutenant governor running mate in the Iowa gubernatorial election, 2014. Hatch and Vernon ran against Republican incumbent Terry Branstad and lost 59% to 37%.

=== 2016 election ===
On January 15, 2015, Vernon announced her bid for Iowa's 1st congressional district in the 2016 election. Vernon won the Democratic primary against Pat Murphy on June 7, 2016. She faced incumbent Republican Rod Blum in the general election. Blum defeated Vernon with 54% of the vote.

=== 2017 election ===
Vernon ran for Cedar Rapids Mayor in 2017 but lost, marking her fourth electoral defeat in four years.

== Personal life ==
Vernon married her husband, Bill Vernon, in 1984. The couple has three adult daughters.

== Electoral history ==
Cedar Rapids City Council District 2 election, 2007
Candidate	Votes	%
Monica Vernon	1,495	56.69
Sarah Hendrson	1,282	37.37
Robin B. Tucker	199	5.80
Write-ins	5	0.15
Total votes	3,431	100.0

Cedar Rapids City Council District 2 election, 2011
Candidate	Votes	%
Monica W. Vernon (incumbent)	2,966	64.10
Taylor G. Nelson	1,281	27.69
Paul T. Larson	342	7.39
Write-ins	38	0.82
Total votes	4,627	100.0

Iowa's 1st congressional district election, 2014 Democratic primary
Party	Candidate	Votes	%
Democratic	Pat Murphy	10,189	36.7
Democratic	Monica Vernon	6,559	23.6
Democratic	Swati Dandekar	5,076	18.3
Democratic	Anesa Kajtazović	4,067	14.7
Democratic	Dave O'Brien	1,846	6.7
Democratic	Write-ins	18	0.0
Total votes		27,755	100.0

Iowa gubernatorial election, 2014
Party	Candidate	Votes	%
Republican	Terry Branstad (incumbent) / Kim Reynolds (incumbent)	666,032	58.99%
Democratic	Jack Hatch / Monica Vernon	420,787	37.27%
Libertarian	Lee Deakins Hieb / Tim Watson	20,321	1.80%
Independent	Jim Hennager / Mary Margaret Krieg	10,582	0.94%
Iowa	Jonathan R. Narcisse / Michael L. Richards	10,240	0.91%
Write-in	Write-ins	1,095	0.09%
Total votes		1,129,057	100.0%
Republican hold			

Iowa's 1st congressional district election, 2016 Democratic primary
Party	Candidate	Votes	%
Democratic	Monica Vernon	21,032	67.5
Democratic	Pat Murphy	10,090	32.4
Democratic	Write-ins	38	0.1
Total votes		31,160	100.0

Iowa's 1st congressional district election, 2016
Party	Candidate	Votes	%
Republican	Rod Blum (incumbent)	206,903	53.7
Democratic	Monica Vernon	177,403	46.1
Write-in	Write-ins	671	0.2
Total votes		384,977	100.0
Republican hold			

Cedar Rapids mayoral election, 2017
Candidates	General Election		Run-off Election	
	Votes	%	Votes	%
Brad Hart	3,599	20.38	9,528	54.15
Monica Vernon	5,361	30.36	8,010	45.53
Scott E. Olson	3,531	19.19		
Gary Hinzman	1,941	10.99		
Kris G. Gulick	1,503	8.51		
Jorel Robinson	688	3.90		
Timothy Pridegon	575	3.26		
Lemi T. Tilahun	424	2.40		
Write-ins	39	0.22	35	0.20
Turnout	17,661	20.32	17,573	20.19

Party political offices
Preceded by Patty Judge	Democratic nominee for Lieutenant Governor of Iowa; 2014	Succeeded by Rita Hart
