= 2016 United States House of Representatives elections in Iowa =

- November 8, 2016

All 4 Iowa seats to the United States House of Representatives
	Majority party	Minority party
Party	Republican	Democratic
Last election	3	1
Seats won	3	1
Seat change	Steady	Steady
Popular vote	813,153	673,969
Percentage	53.65%	44.47%
Swing	▲0.46%	▼0.98%

Republican
50–60%
60–70%
70–80%
80–90%
Democratic
40–50%
50–60%
60–70%

The 2016 United States House of Representatives elections in Iowa were held on November 8, 2016, to elect the four U.S. representatives from the state of Iowa, one from each of the state's four congressional districts. The elections coincided with the 2016 U.S. presidential election, as well as other elections to the House of Representatives, elections to the United States Senate and various state and local elections. The primaries were held on June 7.

== District 1 ==
2016 Iowa's 1st congressional district election
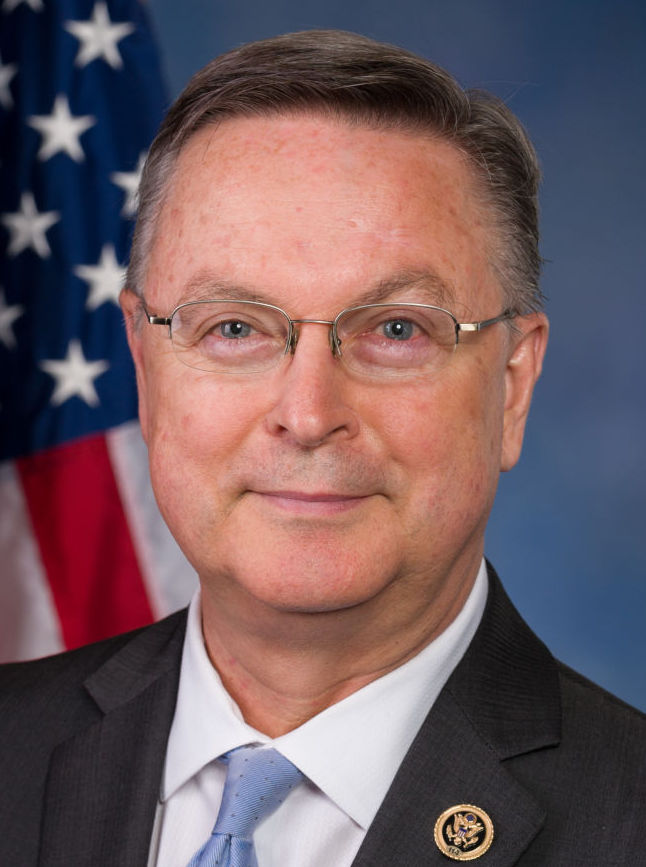

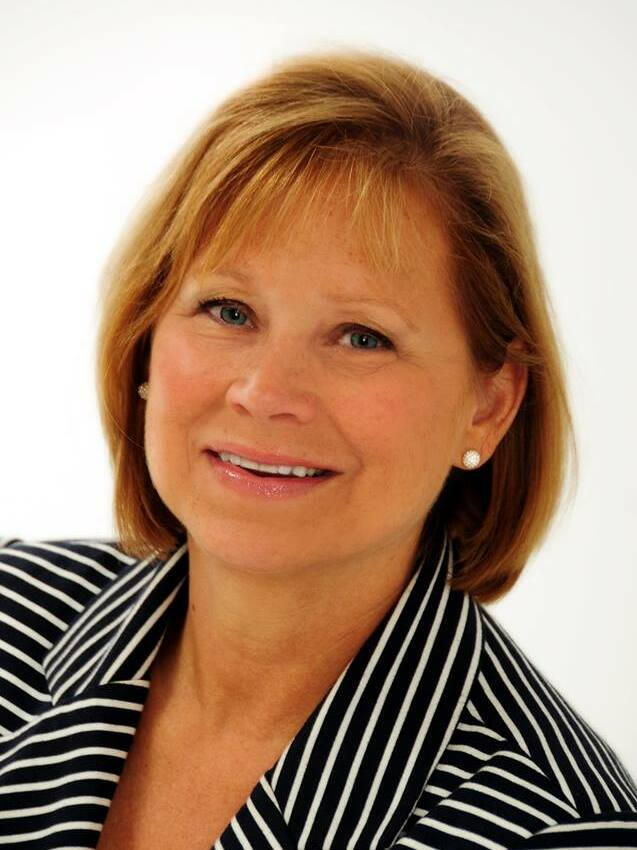
Nominee	Rod Blum	Monica Vernon
Party	Republican	Democratic
Popular vote	206,903	177,403
Percentage	53.8%	46.2%
- County results Blum: 50–60% 60–70% Vernon: 50–60%
U.S. Representatives before election
Rod Blum
Republican
Elected U.S. Representatives
Rod Blum
Republican

Incumbent Republican Rod Blum, who had represented the district since 2015, ran for re-election. He was elected with 51% of the vote in 2014. The district had a PVI of D+5.

=== Republican primary ===
==== Candidates ====
===== Nominee =====
- Rod Blum, incumbent U.S. Representative

==== Results ====
Republican primary results
Party	Candidate	Votes	%
Republican	Rod Blum (incumbent)	13,411	99.4
Write-in		88	0.6
Total votes		13,499	100.0

=== Democratic primary ===
==== Candidates ====
===== Nominee =====
- Monica Vernon, Cedar Rapids City Council member, candidate for this seat in 2014 and nominee for Lieutenant Governor of Iowa in 2014

===== Eliminated in primary =====
- Pat Murphy, former Speaker of the Iowa House of Representatives and nominee for this seat in 2014

===== Withdrawn =====
- Gary Kroeger, advertising executive and former actor
- Ravi Patel, president of Hawkeye Hotels

===== Declined =====
- Chet Culver, former Governor of Iowa
- Swati Dandekar, former member of the Iowa Utilities Board, former state senator and candidate for the seat in 2014
- Anesa Kajtazovic, former state representative and candidate for this seat in 2014
- Dave O'Brien, attorney, nominee for 6th district in 1988 and candidate for this seat in 2014

===== Endorsements =====
Gary Kroeger

State legislators

- Timi Brown-Powers, state representative
Monica Vernon

U.S. Representatives

- Cheri Bustos, U.S. Representative
- Dave Loebsack, U.S. Representative

State legislators

- Liz Bennett, state representative
- Joe Bolkcom, state senator
- Bill Dotzler, state senator
- Bob Dvorsky, state senator
- Jack Hatch, former state senator and nominee for governor in 2014
- Rob Hogg, state senator
- Pam Jochum, President of the Iowa Senate
- Vicki Lensing, state representative
- Mary Mascher, state representative
- Liz Mathis, state senator
- Kirsten Running-Marquardt, state representative
- Art Staed, state representative
- Sally Stutsman, state representative
- Rich Taylor, state senator

Organizations

- EMILY's List

==== Results ====
Democratic primary results
Party	Candidate	Votes	%
Democratic	Monica Vernon	21,032	67.5
Democratic	Pat Murphy	10,090	32.4
Write-in		38	0.1
Total votes		31,160	100.0

=== General election ===
==== Polling ====
Poll source	Date(s) administered	Sample size	Margin of error	Rod Blum (R)	Monica Vernon (D)	Other	Undecided
The Polling Company Inc./WomanTrend (R-Blum)	October 29–31, 2016	400	± 4.9%	52%	41%	—	6%
Normington, Petts and Associates (D-HMP)	October 10–11, 2016	400	± 4.9%	45%	44%	—	11%
Lake Research Partners (D)	September 30 – October 3, 2016	439	± 4.7%	48%	46%	—	—
The Polling Company Inc./WomanTrend (R-Blum)	September 29 – October 1, 2016	400	± 4.9%	52%	36%	—	—
Loras College	September 20–22, 2016	368	± 5.1%	45%	38%	1%	16%
The Polling Company Inc./WomanTrend (R-Blum)	August 14–16, 2016	400	± 4.9%	50%	43%	—	8%
DFM Research	November 4–11, 2015	328	± 5.4%	46%	38%	2%	13%

Hypothetical polling

Poll source	Date(s) administered	Sample size	Margin of error	Rod Blum (R)	Pat Murphy (D)	Other	Undecided
DFM Research	November 4–11, 2015	328	± 5.4%	45%	42%	2%	10%

==== Predictions ====
Source	Ranking	As of
The Cook Political Report	Tossup	November 7, 2016
Daily Kos Elections	Tossup	November 7, 2016
Rothenberg	Tossup	November 3, 2016
Sabato's Crystal Ball	Lean R	November 7, 2016
RCP	Tossup	October 31, 2016

==== Results ====
Iowa's 1st congressional district, 2016
Party	Candidate	Votes	%
Republican	Rod Blum (incumbent)	206,903	53.7
Democratic	Monica Vernon	177,403	46.1
Write-in		671	0.2
Total votes		384,977	100.0
Republican hold			

== District 2 ==
2016 Iowa's 2nd congressional district election
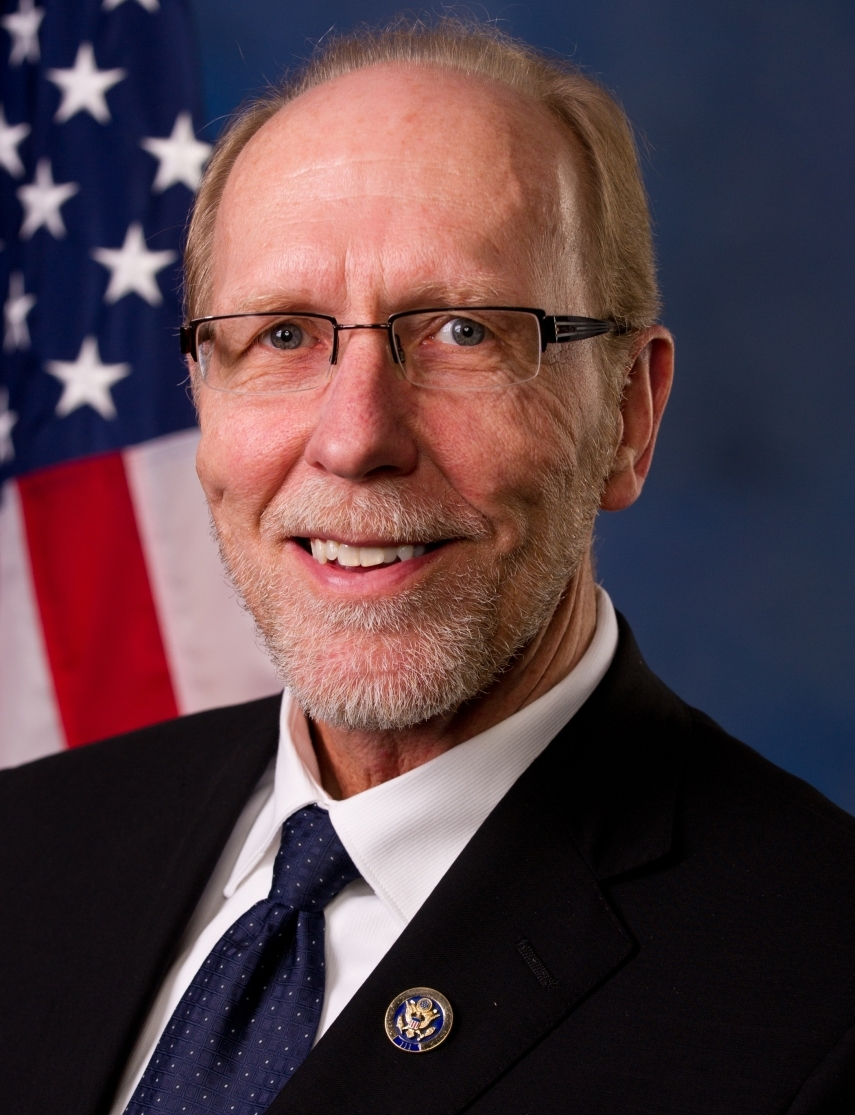

Nominee	Dave Loebsack	Christopher Peters
Party	Democratic	Republican
Popular vote	198,571	170,933
Percentage	53.7%	46.3%
- County results Loebsack: 50–60% 60–70% Peters: 50–60% 60–70%
U.S. Representative before election
Dave Loebsack
Democratic
Elected U.S. Representative
Dave Loebsack
Democratic

Incumbent Democrat Dave Loebsack, who had represented the district since 2007, ran for re-election. He was re-elected with 52% of the vote in 2014. The district had a PVI of D+4.

=== Democratic primary ===
==== Candidates ====
===== Nominee =====
- Dave Loebsack, incumbent U.S. Representative

==== Results ====
Democratic primary results
Party	Candidate	Votes	%
Democratic	Dave Loebsack (incumbent)	23,738	99.0
Democratic	Write-ins	238	1.0
Total votes		23,976	100.0

=== Republican primary ===
==== Candidates ====
===== Nominee =====
- Christopher Peters, thoracic surgeon

===== Declined =====
- Mark Chelgren, state senator

==== Results ====
Republican primary results
Party	Candidate	Votes	%
Republican	Christopher Peters	14,987	99.3
Write-in		107	0.7
Total votes		15,094	100.0

=== General election ===
==== Predictions ====
Source	Ranking	As of
The Cook Political Report	Safe D	November 7, 2016
Daily Kos Elections	Safe D	November 7, 2016
Rothenberg	Safe D	November 3, 2016
Sabato's Crystal Ball	Safe D	November 7, 2016
RCP	Likely D	October 31, 2016

==== Results ====
Iowa's 2nd congressional district, 2016
Party	Candidate	Votes	%
Democratic	Dave Loebsack (incumbent)	198,571	53.7
Republican	Christopher Peters	170,933	46.2
Write-in		528	0.1
Total votes		370,032	100.0
Democratic hold			

== District 3 ==
2016 Iowa's 3rd congressional district election
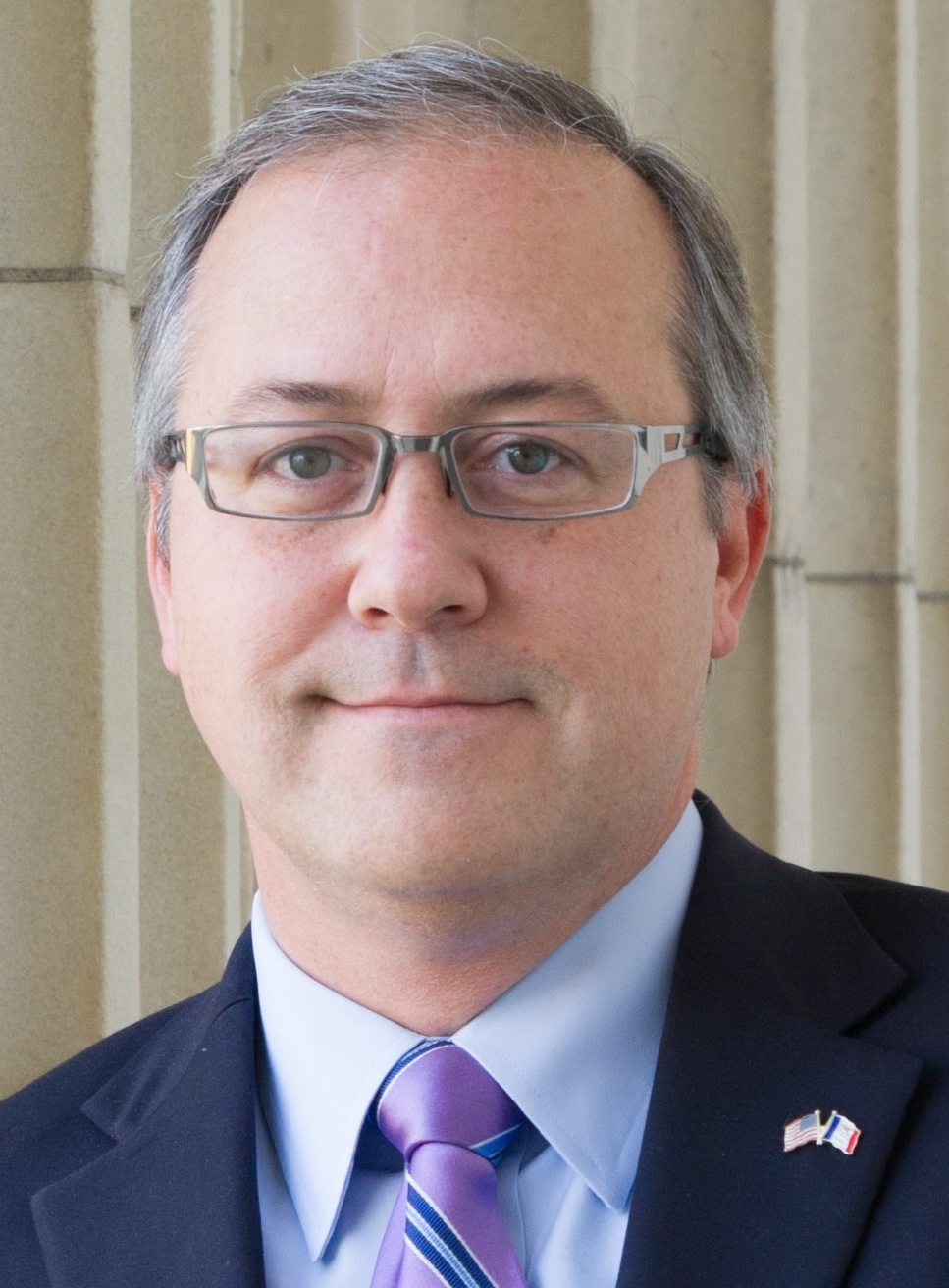

Nominee	David Young	Jim Mowrer
Party	Republican	Democratic
Popular vote	208,598	155,002
Percentage	53.5%	39.8%
- County results Young: 50–60% 60–70% 70–80% Mowrer: 40–50%
U.S. Representative before election
David Young
Republican
Elected U.S. Representative
David Young
Republican

Incumbent David Young, who had represented the district since 2015, ran for re-election. He was re-elected with 53% of the vote in 2014. The district had a PVI of EVEN.

=== Republican primary ===
==== Candidates ====
===== Nominee =====
- David Young, incumbent U.S. Representative

===== Eliminated in primary =====
- Joe Grandanette, retired teacher and candidate for this seat in 2014

===== Declined =====
- Brad Zaun, state senator and candidate for the seat in 2010 and 2014

==== Results ====
Republican primary results
Party	Candidate	Votes	%
Republican	David Young (incumbent)	17,977	84.8
Republican	Joe Grandanette	3,143	14.8
Write-in		85	0.4
Total votes		21,205	100.0

=== Democratic primary ===
==== Candidates ====
===== Nominee =====
- Jim Mowrer, vice chair of the Iowa Democratic Party, former special assistant to the United States Under Secretary of the Army, and nominee for 4th district in 2014

===== Eliminated in primary =====
- Desmund Adams, executive recruiting firm owner and 2012 State Senate candidate
- Mike Sherzan, businessman from West Des Moines

===== Declined =====
- Staci Appel, former state senator and nominee for this seat in 2014
- Nathan Blake, Des Moines School Board member, Assistant Iowa Attorney General and 2014 State Senate candidate
- Chet Culver, former Governor of Iowa
- Nick Klinefeldt, United States Attorney for the Southern District of Iowa
- Matt McCoy, state senator
- Mike Sherzan, businessman and candidate for this seat in 2014

==== Results ====
Democratic primary results
Party	Candidate	Votes	%
Democratic	Jim Mowrer	13,024	49.6
Democratic	Mike Sherzan	9,573	36.4
Democratic	Desmund Adams	3,650	13.9
Write-in		38	0.1
Total votes		26,285	100.0

=== General election ===
==== Polling ====
Poll source	Date(s) administered	Sample size	Margin of error	David Young (R)	Jim Mowrer (D)	Undecided
GQR Research (D-DCCC)	October 2016	400	± 4.9%	49%	46%	3%
Loras College	September 20–22, 2016	327	± 5.4%	46%	36%	15%
The Tarrance Group (R-Young)	September 20–22, 2016	400	± 4.9%	52%	37%	11%
RABA Research	September 6–8, 2016	303	± 5.6%	50%	35%	16%

==== Predictions ====
Source	Ranking	As of
The Cook Political Report	Lean R	November 7, 2016
Daily Kos Elections	Lean R	November 7, 2016
Rothenberg	Tilt R	November 3, 2016
Sabato's Crystal Ball	Lean R	November 7, 2016
RCP	Lean R	October 31, 2016

==== Results ====
Iowa's 3rd congressional district, 2016
Party	Candidate	Votes	%
Republican	David Young (incumbent)	208,598	53.4
Democratic	Jim Mowrer	155,002	39.7
Libertarian	Bryan Jack Holder	15,372	3.9
Independent	Claudia Addy	6,348	1.6
Independent	Joe Grandanette	4,518	1.2
Write-in		449	0.1
Total votes		390,287	100.0
Republican hold			

== District 4 ==
2016 Iowa's 4th congressional district election
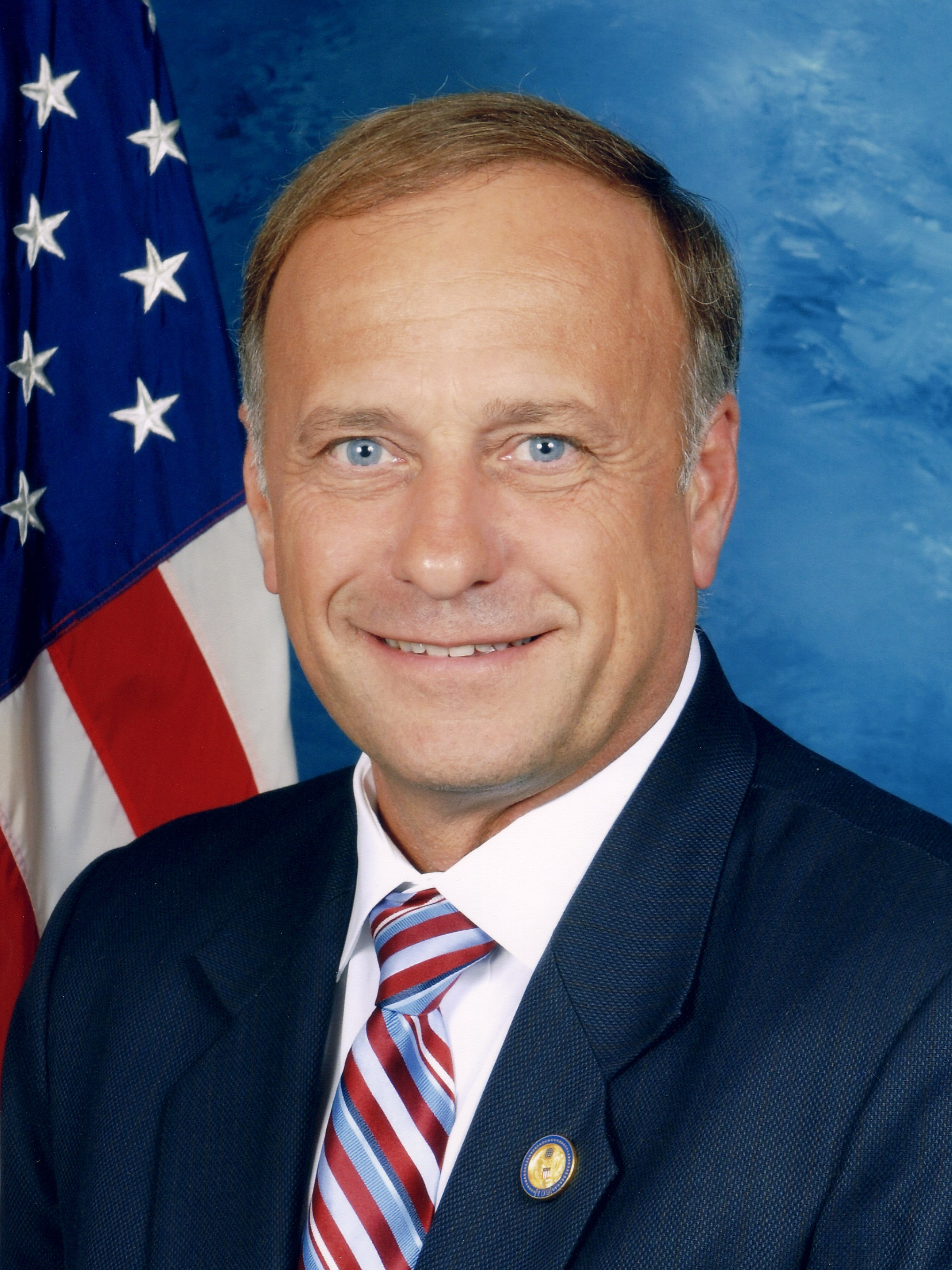

Nominee	Steve King	Kim Weaver
Party	Republican	Democratic
Popular vote	226,719	142,993
Percentage	61.3%	38.7%
- County results King: 50–60% 60–70% 70–80% 80–90% Weaver: 50–60%
U.S. Representative before election
Steve King
Republican
Elected U.S. Representative
Steve King
Republican

Incumbent Republican Steve King, who had represented the district since 2003, ran for re-election. He was re-elected with 62% of the vote in 2014. The district had a PVI of R+5.

=== Republican primary ===
==== Candidates ====
===== Nominee =====
- Steve King, incumbent U.S. Representative

===== Eliminated in primary =====
- Rick Bertrand, state senator

==== Results ====
Republican primary results
Party	Candidate	Votes	%
Republican	Steve King (incumbent)	29,098	64.6
Republican	Rick Bertrand	15,872	35.3
Write-in		49	0.1
Total votes		45,019	100.0

=== Democratic primary ===
==== Candidates ====
===== Nominee =====
- Kim Weaver, chair of the O'Brien County Democrats and local AFSCME official

==== Results ====
Democratic primary results
Party	Candidate	Votes	%
Democratic	Kim Weaver	12,738	99.5
Write-in		62	0.5
Total votes		12,800	100.0

=== General election ===
==== Predictions ====
Source	Ranking	As of
The Cook Political Report	Safe R	November 7, 2016
Daily Kos Elections	Safe R	November 7, 2016
Rothenberg	Safe R	November 3, 2016
Sabato's Crystal Ball	Safe R	November 7, 2016
RCP	Safe R	October 31, 2016

==== Results ====
Iowa's 4th congressional district, 2016
Party	Candidate	Votes	%
Republican	Steve King (incumbent)	226,719	61.2
Democratic	Kim Weaver	142,993	38.6
Write-in		547	0.2
Total votes		370,259	100.0
Republican hold			
