= Barb Kniff McCulla =

American politician (born 1956)

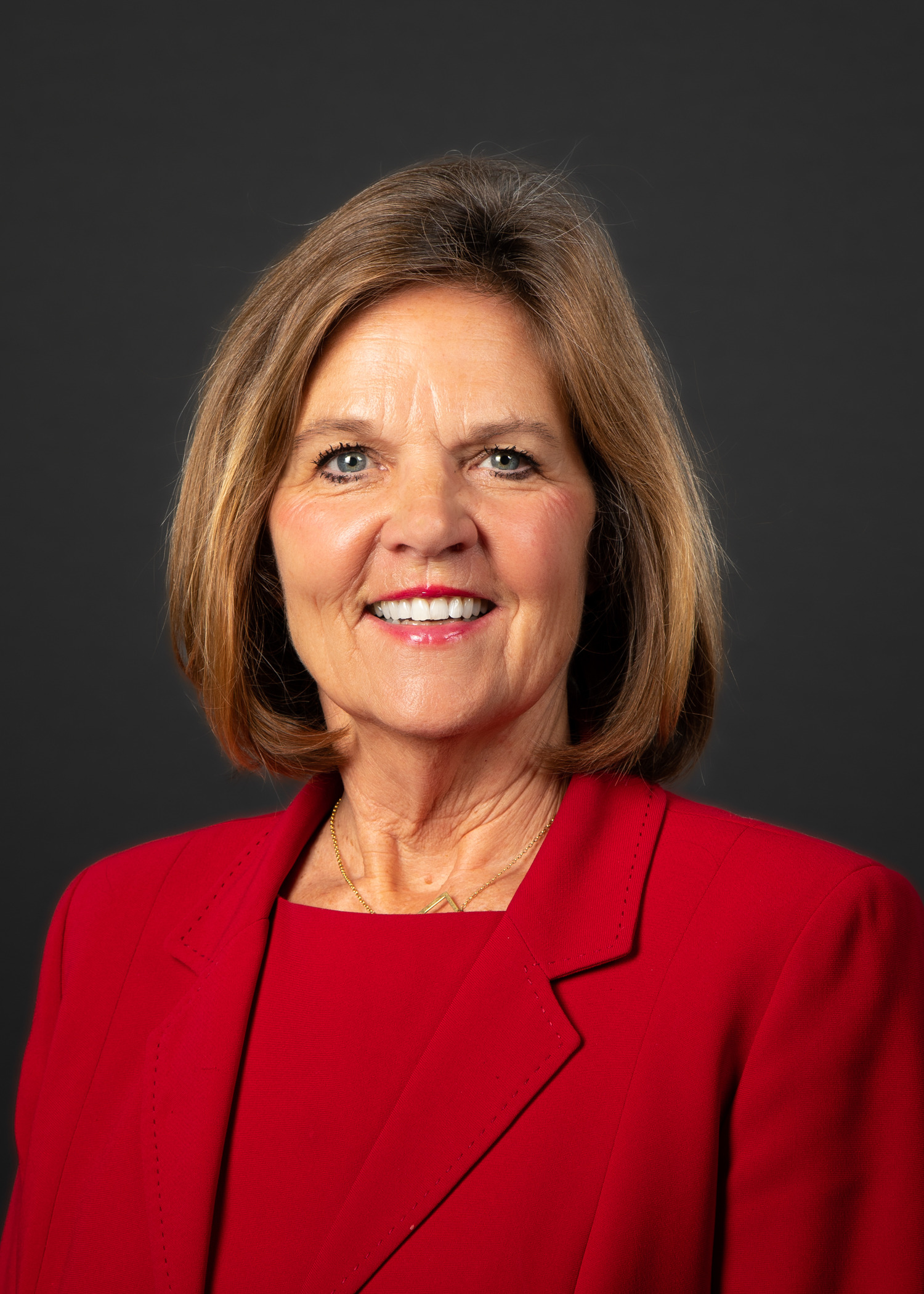

Member of the Iowa House of Representatives from the 37th district
- Incumbent
- Assumed office January 9, 2023
- Preceded by: Jon Thorup

Personal details
- Born: 1956 (age 69–70) Michigan, U.S.
- Party: Republican
- Spouse: Greg
- Children: 4
- Education: William Penn University (BA)
- Occupation: Small business owner

Barbara Kniff McCulla (Note: The surname is Kniff McCulla) (born 1956) is an American politician and entrepreneur who has represented the 37th district in the Iowa House of Representatives since January 2023, which consists of most of Marion County, parts of southern Jasper County and parts of western Mahaska County. She is a member of the Republican Party.

== Early life ==
Kniff McCulla was born in 1956 in Michigan, where she was raised. She received a bachelor's degree from William Penn University.

== Political career ==
Kniff McCulla announced her candidacy for the 37th district of the Iowa House of Representatives following decennial redistricting in 2021. Endorsed by Governor Kim Reynolds, she defeated incumbent Jon Thorup (Note: Thorup was redistricted into the 37th district during his term in 2021; he had previously been representing district 28) in the Republican primaries on June 7, 2022, with over 70 percent of the vote. She defeated Democrat Mike Overman in the general election on November 8 with over 74 percent of the vote. She assumed office on January 9, 2023.

Kniff McCulla serves on the Commerce, Economic Growth and Technology, Health and Human Services, Labor and Workforce, and Ways and Means committees, the lattermost of which she is the vice chair. She is the chair of the Labor and Workforce committee.

In March 2024, Kniff McCulla announced that she is running for reelection. She won the Republican primaries unopposed on June 4, 2024, and will run in the general election unopposed on November 5, 2024.

Kniff McCulla has said that her priorities include economic growth and small business. She supports school choice and opposes abortion.

=== Committee assignments ===
- Labor and Workforce (chair)
- Economic Growth and Technology
- Education
- Local Government

== Personal life ==
Kniff McCulla has a husband, Greg, four children, and 12 grandchildren. She resides in Pella, Iowa. She is a former Sunday school teacher and owns a construction company.

== Electoral history ==
* = incumbent

Election	Political result	Candidate	Party	Votes	%
Iowa House of Representatives Republican primary elections, 2022; District 37; Turnout: 3,868	Republican (newly redistricted)	Barb Kniff McCulla	Republican	2,715	70.2
Iowa House of Representatives Republican primary elections, 2022; District 37; Turnout: 3,868	Republican (newly redistricted)	Jon Thorup*	Republican	1,150	29.7
Iowa House of Representatives Republican primary elections, 2022; District 37; Turnout: 3,868	Republican (newly redistricted)	Other/Write-in votes		3	0.1
Iowa House of Representatives general elections, 2022; District 37; Turnout: 14,196	Republican (newly redistricted)	Barb Kniff McCulla	Republican	10,593	74.6
Iowa House of Representatives general elections, 2022; District 37; Turnout: 14,196	Republican (newly redistricted)	Mike Overman	Democratic	3,591	25.3
Iowa House of Representatives general elections, 2022; District 37; Turnout: 14,196	Republican (newly redistricted)	Other/Write-in votes		12	0.1
