= Tom Walton (Iowa politician) =

American politician

Member of the Iowa House of Representatives from the 28th district
- Member-elect
- Assumed office January 1, 2027
- Preceded by: David Young

Personal details
- Party: Democratic
- Website: Campaign website

Tom Walton is an American politician. A member of the Democratic Party, he was elected to the Iowa House of Representatives in 2026, representing the 28th district. He unseated Republican David Young in the 2026 election. Walton is an attorney and nonprofit leader.
