= Greg Heartsill =

American politician (born 1971)

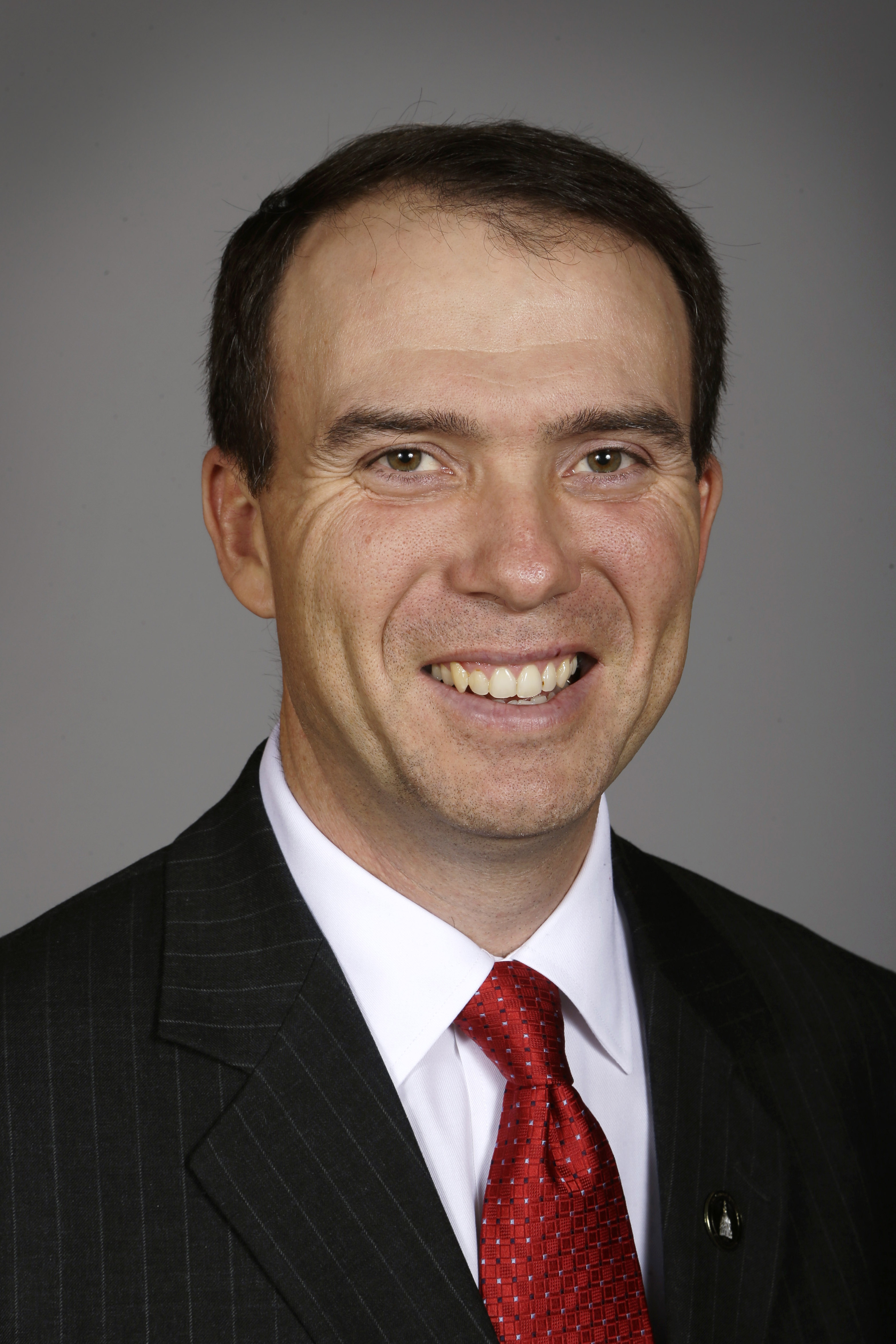

Member of the Iowa House of Representatives from the 28th district
- In office January 14, 2013 – January 14, 2019
- Preceded by: Pat Murphy
- Succeeded by: Jon Thorup

Personal details
- Born: March 14, 1971 (age 55) Mount Pleasant, Iowa, U.S.
- Party: Republican
- Spouse: Angie
- Children: 9
- Education: Indian Hills Community College (AS); Buena Vista College (BA)

Greg T. Heartsill (born March 14, 1971) is an American politician who served as a member of the Iowa House of Representatives for the 28th district from 2013 to 2019.

== Early life and education ==
Heartsill was born in Mount Pleasant, Iowa, and raised in Salem. He earned an associate degree in computer science from Indian Hills Community College and Bachelor of Arts in business from Buena Vista University.

== Career ==
As of January 2013, Heartsill serves on several committees in the Iowa House, including the Judiciary, Public Safety, and Transportation committees. He also served as the vice chair of the HouseGovernment Oversight and Local Government committees. Heartsill did not seek re-election in 2018.

Iowa House of Representatives
| Preceded by Pat Murphy | 28th District; 2013–present | Succeeded by Incumbent |
