= Jon Thorup =

American politician

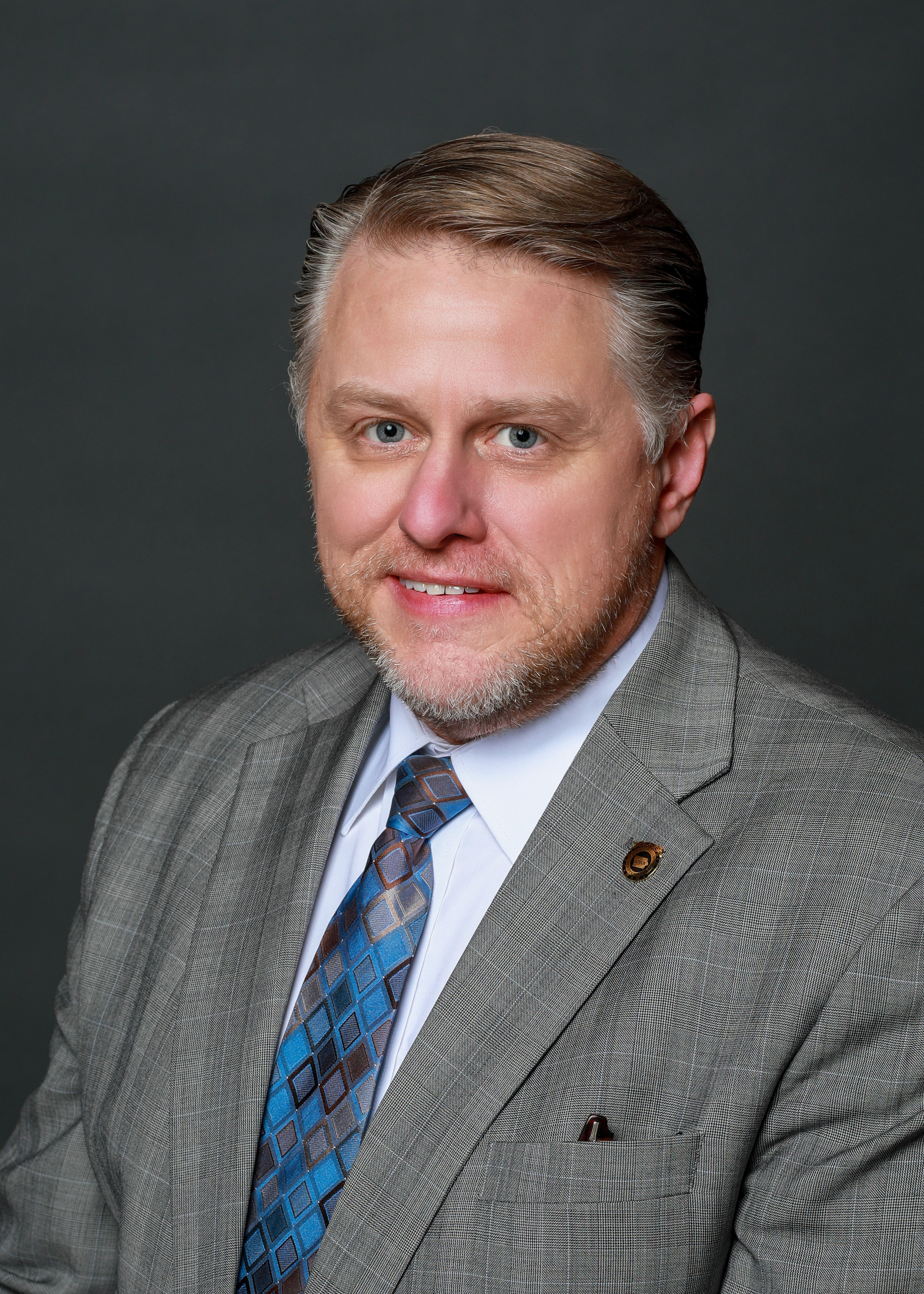
- Thorup in 2021

Member of the Iowa House of Representatives from the 28th district
- In office January 14, 2019 – January 9, 2023
- Preceded by: Greg Heartsill
- Succeeded by: Barb McCulla (redistricting)

Personal details
- Born: Knoxville, Iowa, U.S.
- Party: Republican
- Police career
- Branch: Iowa State Patrol

Jon Thorup is an American politician and law enforcement officer who served as a member of the Iowa House of Representatives from the 28th district. Elected in November 2018, he assumed office on January 14, 2019.

== Early life and education ==
Thorup was born and raised in Knoxville, Iowa. He graduated from Knoxville High School. He graduated from the Iowa Law Enforcement Academy.

== Career ==
After graduating from high school, Thorup worked for the Marion County Sheriff's Department as a part-time employee. He later joined the Iowa State Patrol as a state trooper. He later joined the Iowa Fire Marshal Division before returning to the Iowa State Patrol. As a state trooper, he has been assigned to Osceola, Iowa and Poweshiek County, Iowa. Thorup defeated Jon Van Wyk in the 2018 Republican Party primary and won the November 2018 general election to the Iowa House of Representatives against Democratic candidate Ann Fields. He assumed office on January 14, 2019. During the 2019–2020 legislative session, Thorup served as vice chair of the House Public Safety Committee. Thorup lost to Barb Kniff McCulla, who was endorsed by governor Kim Reynolds, in a Republican Party primary during the 2022 election cycle.
