= Cindy Axne =

American politician (born 1965)

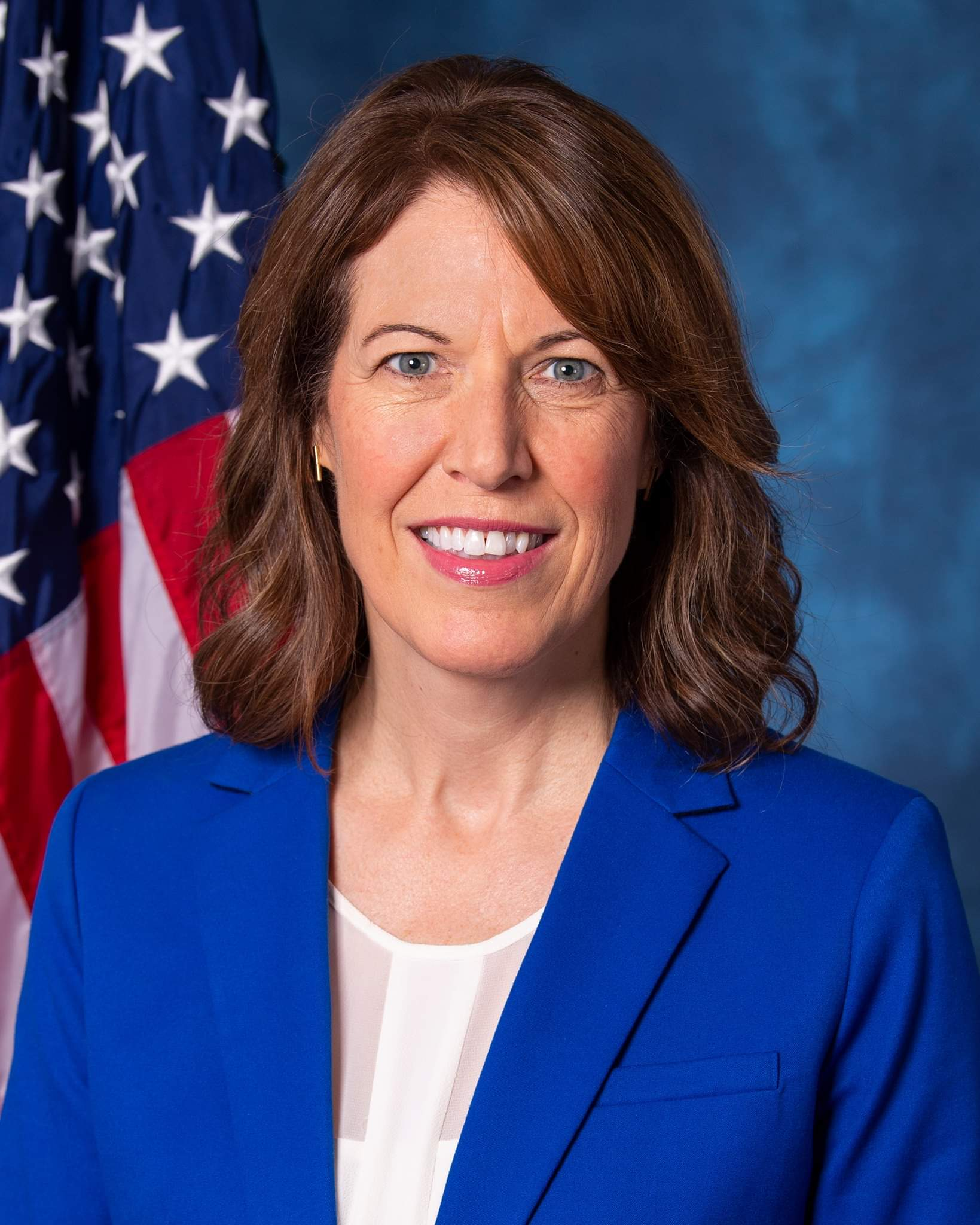

Member of the U.S. House of Representatives from Iowa's 3rd district
- In office January 3, 2019 – January 3, 2023
- Preceded by: David Young
- Succeeded by: Zach Nunn

Personal details
- Born: Cynthia Lynne Wadle; April 20, 1965 (age 61) Grand Rapids, Michigan, U.S.
- Party: Democratic
- Spouse: John Axne
- Children: 2
- Education: University of Iowa (BA); Northwestern University (MBA)

Cynthia Lynne Axne (née Wadle; born April 20, 1965) is an American politician who served as the U.S. representative from Iowa's 3rd congressional district from 2019 until 2023.

A member of the Democratic Party, Axne narrowly defeated incumbent Republican David Young in the 2018 elections. The district was anchored in the state capital Des Moines; it included much of the state's southwest quadrant, including Council Bluffs. Axne ran for reelection to a third term in 2022, but lost to Republican challenger Zach Nunn, a U.S. Air Force officer.

== Early life and career ==
Axne was born in Grand Rapids, Michigan, in 1965, the daughter of Terry and Joanne Wadle. She graduated from Valley High School in West Des Moines, Iowa. She earned a bachelor's degree in journalism from the University of Iowa and a Master of Business Administration from Northwestern University.

After graduating from college, Axne worked in leadership development and strategic planning for the Tribune Company in Chicago. From 2005 to 2014, she worked in the Iowa state government on service delivery in over 20 state agencies in the executive branch.

== U.S. House of Representatives ==
=== Elections ===
==== 2018 ====
In 2018, Axne ran for the United States House of Representatives in Iowa's 3rd congressional district. She won the Democratic primary election with 57.91% of the vote and narrowly defeated incumbent Representative David Young in the general election, becoming, with Abby Finkenauer, one of the first two women from Iowa elected to the House. Young carried 15 of the district's 16 counties, but Axne won Polk County, the district's most populous county and home to Des Moines, by over 30,000 votes, far exceeding the overall margin of 8,000.

==== 2020 ====
In 2020, Axne won the Democratic primary virtually unopposed, facing only write-in candidates. She then defeated David Young in a rematch in the general election, with 48.9% of the vote to Young's 47.6%.

==== 2022 ====
Axne ran for reelection in 2022, but lost to Republican state Senator Zach Nunn by a margin of 0.7%.

=== Tenure ===
Axne took office during the 2018–2019 United States federal government shutdown and requested that her pay be withheld until the shutdown ended. On January 30, 2019, she co-sponsored a bill, the Shutdown to End All Shutdowns (SEAS) Act, to prevent future federal government shutdowns from happening.

In September 2021, Axne was accused of failing to disclose up to $645,000 in stock trades. Reports also found that she had bought and sold stocks in companies she was tasked to oversee as a member of the House Financial Services Committee.

In July 2022, the Committee on Ethics voted to clear Axne of any wrongdoing and dismissed previously filed complaints on stock trading.

In September 2022, Axne voted for the Inflation Reduction Act by proxy while on vacation in France.

As of October 2022, Axne has voted in line with Joe Biden's stated position 100% of the time. In an October 2022 interview, she called Biden "the most impactful president we've seen in this country's history".

In 2022, Axne voted for H.R. 1808: Assault Weapons Ban of 2022.

=== Committee assignments ===
- United States House Committee on Agriculture
  - Subcommittee on Commodity Exchanges, Energy, and Credit
  - Subcommittee on Conservation and Forestry
- United States House Committee on Financial Services
  - Subcommittee on Housing, Community Development and Insurance
  - Subcommittee on Investor Protection, Entrepreneurship and Capital Markets

=== Caucus memberships ===
- New Democrat Coalition

== Electoral history ==
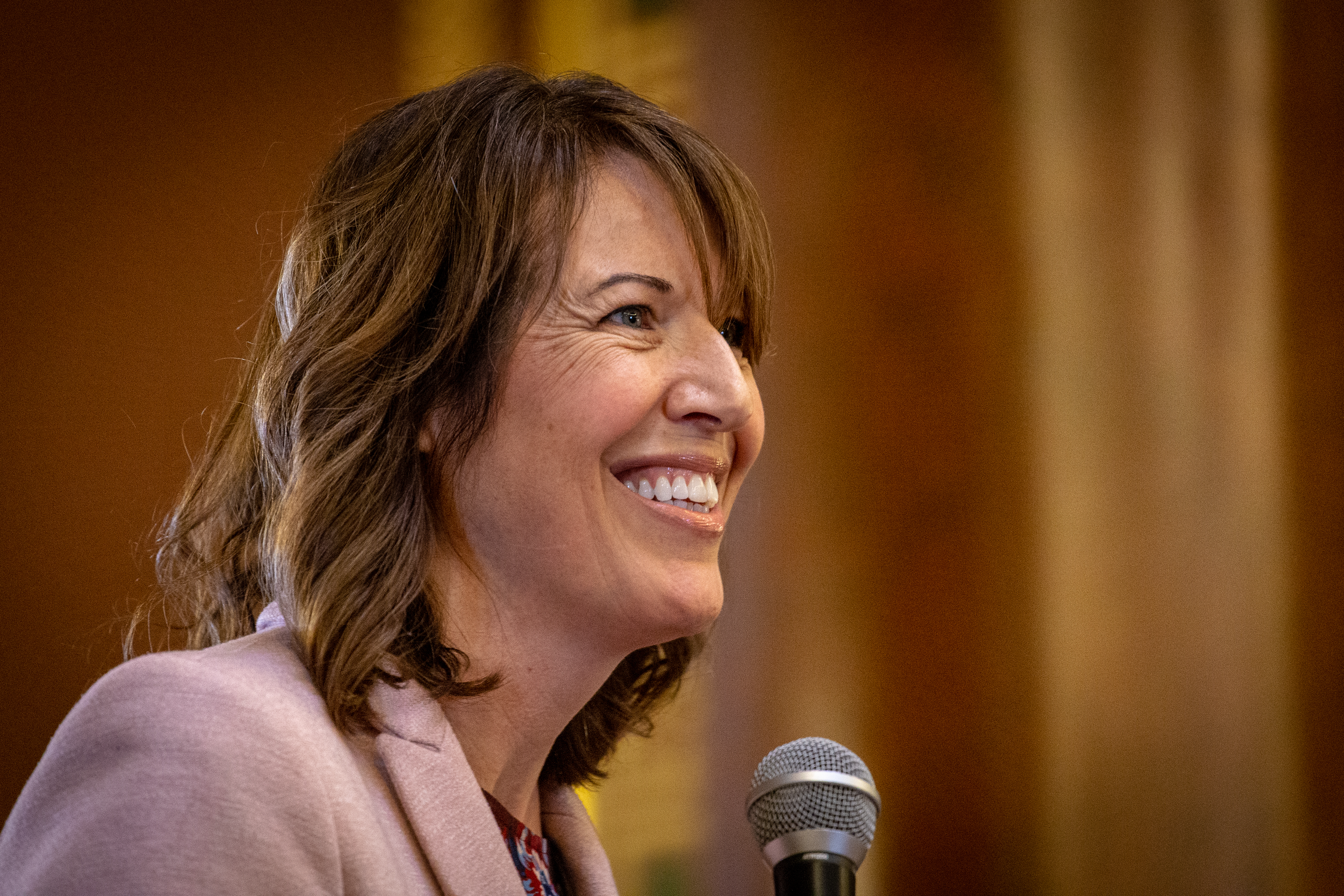
Cindy Axne speaking to 2019 Women's March attendees in the rotunda of the Iowa State Capitol in Des Moines

2018 Iowa 3rd Congressional District Democratic Primary
Party	Candidate	Votes	%
Democratic	Cindy Axne	32,070	57.91
Democratic	Eddie J. Mauro	14,582	26.33
Democratic	Pete D'Alessandro	8,595	15.52
Democratic	Write-ins	136	0.25
Total votes		55,383	100

2018 Iowa 3rd Congressional District General Election
Party	Candidate	Votes	%
Democratic	Cindy Axne	175,642	49.3
Republican	David Young (incumbent)	167,933	47.1
Libertarian	Bryan Holder	7,267	2.0
Legal Marijuana Now	Mark Elworth Jr.	2,015	0.6
Green	Paul Knupp	1,888	0.5
Independent	Joe Grandanette	1,301	0.4
n/a	Write-ins	195	0.1
Total votes		356,241	100.0

2020 Iowa 3rd Congressional District Democratic Primary
Party	Candidate	Votes	%
Democratic	Cindy Axne (incumbent)	76,681	99.2
n/a	Write-ins	623	0.8
Total votes		77,304	100.0

2020 Iowa 3rd Congressional District General Election
Party	Candidate	Votes	%
Democratic	Cindy Axne (incumbent)	219,205	48.9
Republican	David Young	212,997	47.6
Libertarian	Bryan Jack Holder	15,361	3.4
n/a	Write-ins	384	0.1
Total votes		447,947	100.0

2022 Iowa 3rd Congressional District General Election
Party	Candidate	Votes	%
Republican	Zach Nunn	156,262	50.2
Democratic	Cindy Axne (incumbent)	154,117	49.6
n/a	Write-ins	534	0.2
Total votes		310,913	100.0

== Post-congressional career ==
On June 7, 2023, Axne was appointed as Senior Advisor for Rural Engagement, Delivery and Prosperity to the U.S. Department of Agriculture under the Biden Administration.

== Personal life ==
Axne and her husband, John, operate a digital design firm. They live in west Des Moines and are members of Sacred Heart Catholic Church in West Des Moines.

Axne is 6 feet (1.83 m) tall.

== See also ==
- Women in the United States House of Representatives

U.S. House of Representatives
Preceded by David Young	Member of the U.S. House of Representatives from Iowa's 3rd congressional district 2019–2023	Succeeded by Zach Nunn
U.S. order of precedence (ceremonial)
Preceded by David Young as Former U.S. Representative	Order of precedence of the United States as Former U.S. Representative	Succeeded by Mark Neumann as Former U.S. Representative
