= Steve Falck =

American politician (born 1958)

Member of the Iowa House of Representatives from the 28th district
- In office January 13, 1997 – January 21, 2002

Personal details
- Born: April 26, 1958 (age 68) Manchester, Iowa, U.S.
- Party: Democratic
- Children: 4
- Education: Upper Iowa University
- Occupation: Real estate appraiser

Steven L. Falck (born April 26, 1958) is an American politician in the state of Iowa.

Falck was born in Manchester, Iowa, and attended Upper Iowa University. A Democrat, he served in the Iowa House of Representatives from 1997 to 2002 (28th district).
