= Pat Murphy (Iowa politician) =

American politician (born 1959)

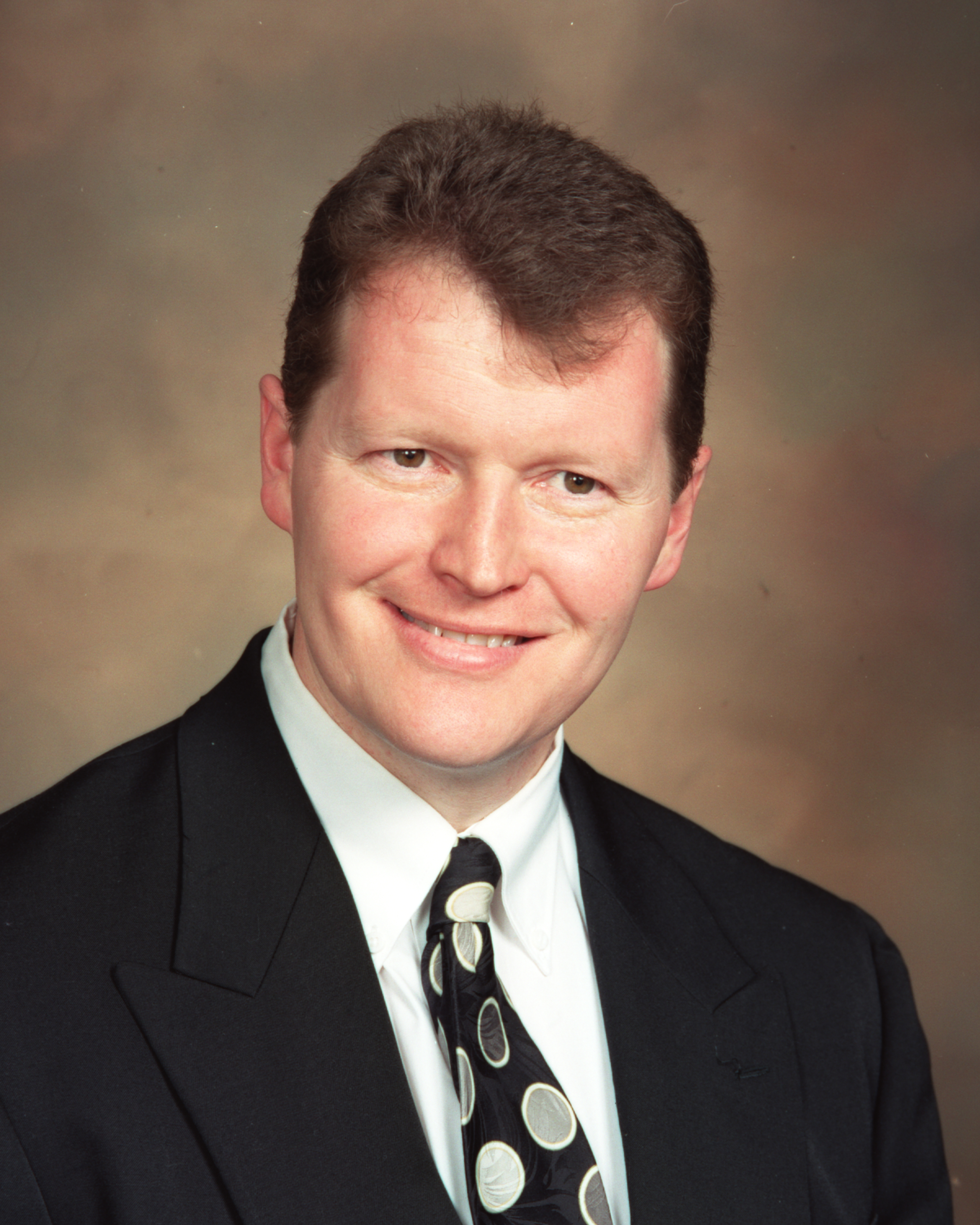
- Official portrait, 2001

Member of the Iowa House of Representatives from the 99th district
- In office 1989–2015
- Preceded by: Jackie Reeder
- Succeeded by: Abby Finkenauer

Personal details
- Born: August 24, 1959 (age 67) Dubuque, Iowa, U.S.
- Party: Democratic
- Spouse: Teri Murphy
- Education: Loras College

Patrick Joseph Murphy (born August 24, 1959) is an American politician who served as Iowa State Representative from the 99th District and Speaker of the Iowa House of Representatives; Murphy was also the Democratic nominee for Iowa's 1st congressional district in 2014. He also previously served as Minority Leader from 2003 to 2007. Murphy is a Democrat and served in the Iowa House after winning a special election in 1989. He received his BA from Loras College.

== U.S. congressional campaigns ==
On June 3, 2014, Murphy won the Democratic nomination in a five-way primary to replace four-term Democrat Bruce Braley in the 1st district, who was giving up the seat to run for United States Senate. Murphy lost to Republican nominee and fellow Dubuque resident Rod Blum in the general election on November 4. Murphy was succeeded in the state house by one of his former pages, Abby Finkenauer, who would go on to unseat Blum in 2018.

Murphy ran again for the same seat in 2016, but lost the Democratic nomination to Cedar Rapids city councilmember Monica Vernon, who had also run for the Democratic nomination in 2014 and lost to Murphy.

Iowa House of Representatives
Preceded by Bill Dieleman	35th District; 1989 – 1992	Succeeded by Pam Jochum
Preceded by Thomas J. Jochum	36th District; 1992 – 2002	Succeeded by Swati Dandekar
Preceded by Jackie Reeder	28th District; 2002 – 2015	Succeeded by Abby Finkenauer
