= Iowa's 2nd House of Representatives district =

American legislative district

House District 2
- Type: District of the Lower house
- Location: Iowa
- Representative: Robert Henderson
- Parent organization: Iowa General Assembly

The Iowa's 2nd District House of Representatives in the state of Iowa. It is currently composed of part of Woodbury County.

== Current elected officials ==
Robert Henderson is the representative currently representing the district.

== Past representatives ==
The district has previously been represented by:

- William S. Allen, 1894–1898
- A. Gordon Stokes, 1971–1973
- Lyle R. Stephens, 1973–1975
- James W. Spradling, 1975–1977
- Lyle R. Stephens, 1977–1979
- Douglas J. Ritsema, 1979–1983
- Al Sturgeon, 1983–1987
- Michael R. Peters, 1987–1991
- Patrick Gill, 1991–1995
- Steve Warnstadt, 1995–2003
- Roger Wendt, 2003–2011
- Chris Hall, 2011–2013
- Megan Jones, 2013–2023
- Robert Henderson, 2023–present
