= List of Amy Klobuchar 2020 presidential campaign endorsements =

- Campaign: 2020 United States presidential election (Democratic Party primaries)
- Candidate: Amy Klobuchar; U.S. Senator from Minnesota (2007–present)
- Affiliation: Democratic Party
- Status: Announced: February 10, 2019; Suspended: March 2, 2020
- Headquarters: Minneapolis, Minnesota
- Slogan: Let's get to work (unofficial)

Website
- amyklobuchar.com

This is a list of notable individuals and organizations who have voiced their endorsement of Amy Klobuchar's campaign for the Democratic Party's nomination for the 2020 U.S. presidential election.

== Federal officials ==
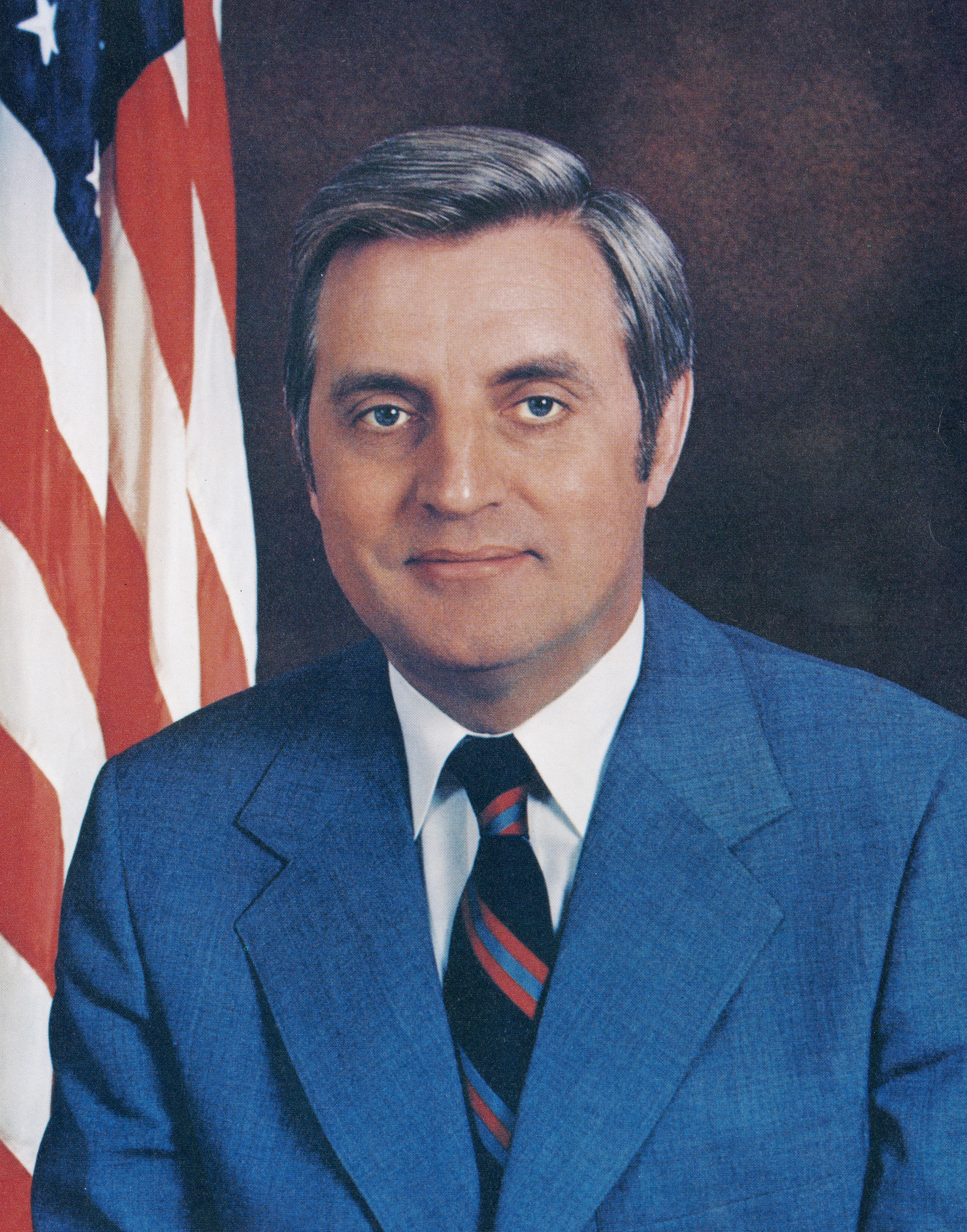
Walter Mondale

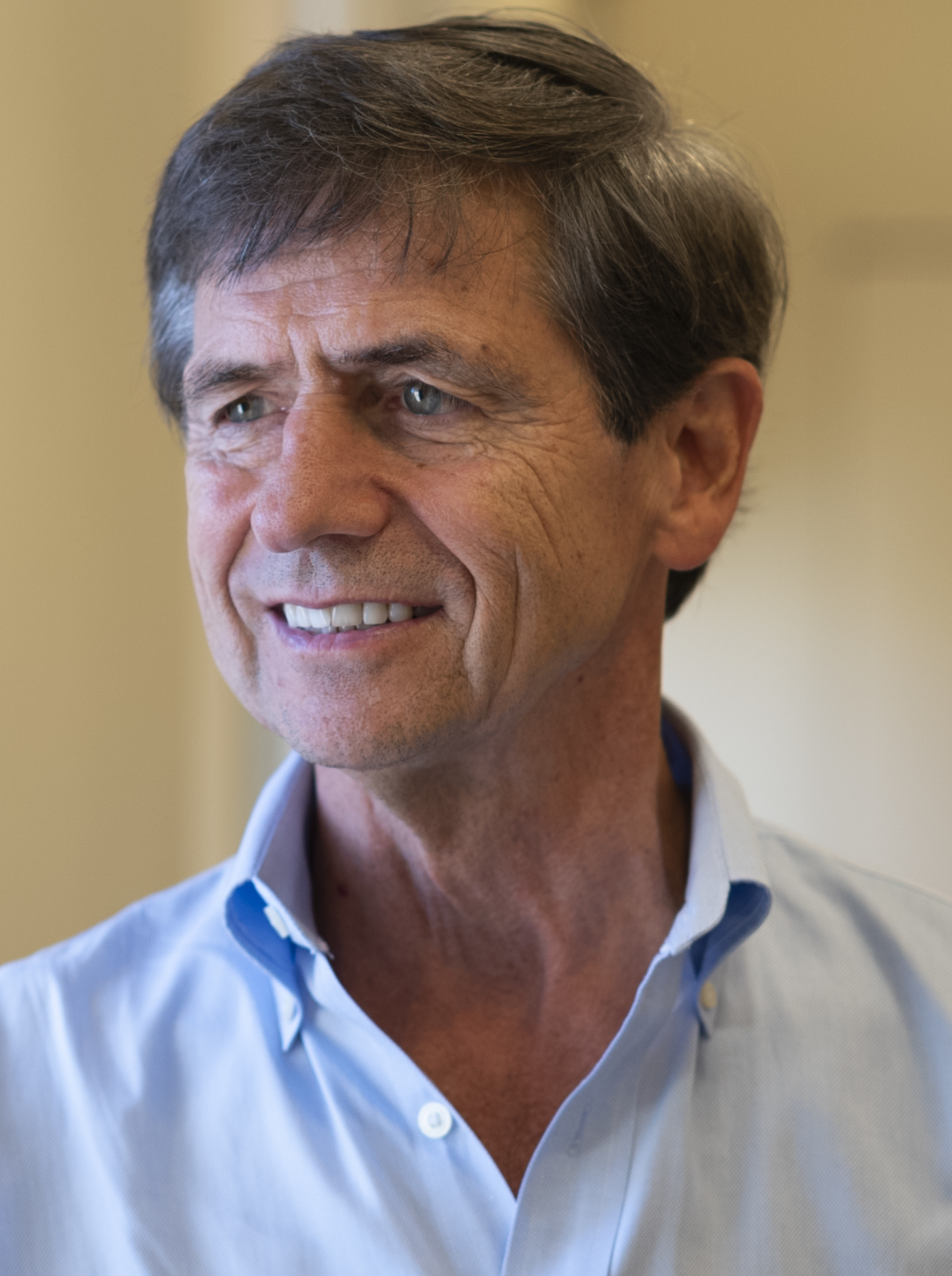
Joe Sestak

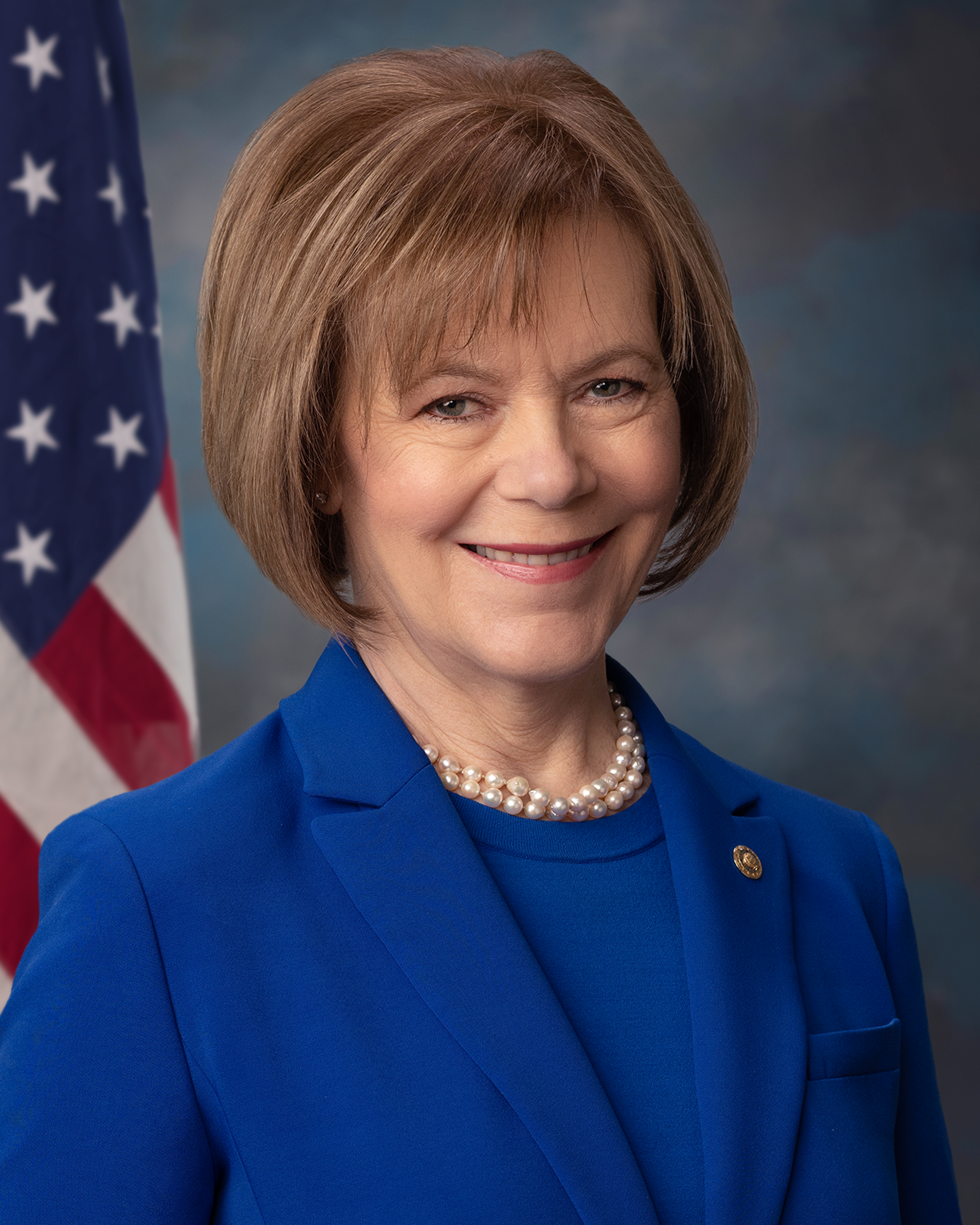
Tina Smith

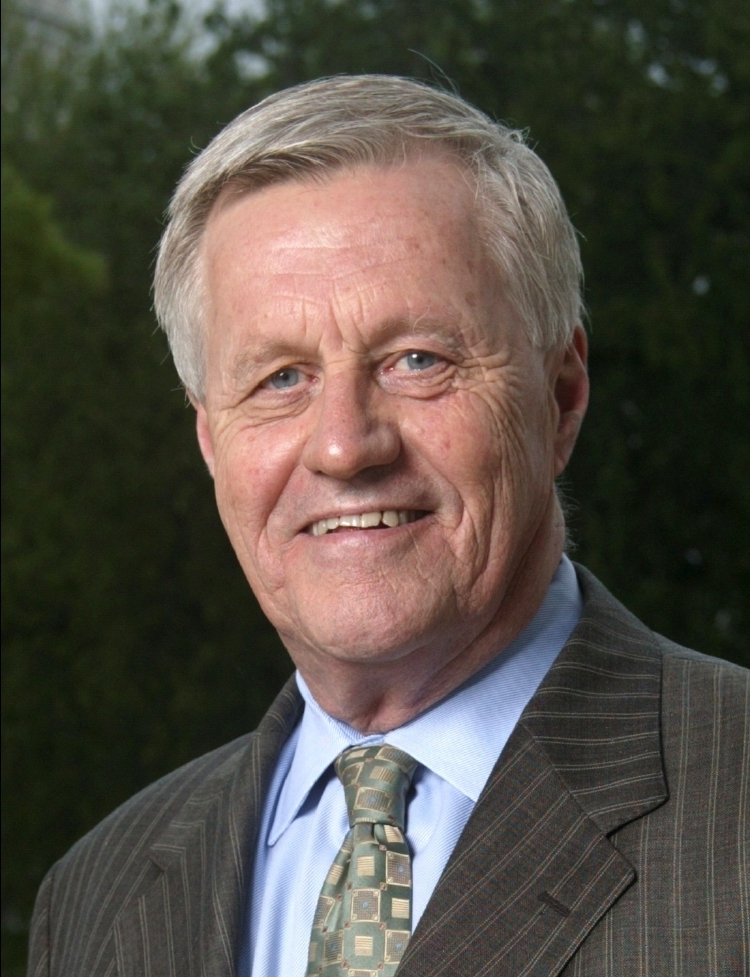
Collin Peterson

=== Vice presidents ===
==== Former ====
- Walter Mondale, former vice president (1977–1981); former U.S. senator from Minnesota (1964–1976); former attorney general of Minnesota (1960–1964); Democratic Party nominee for President in 1984 (later endorsed Joe Biden)

=== U.S. senators ===
==== Current ====
- Tina Smith, U.S. Senator from Minnesota since 2018; former Lieutenant Governor of Minnesota (2015–2018) (later endorsed Joe Biden)

==== Former ====
- Mark Pryor, U.S Senator from Arkansas (2003–2015); Attorney General of Arkansas (1999–2003) (later endorsed Joe Biden)

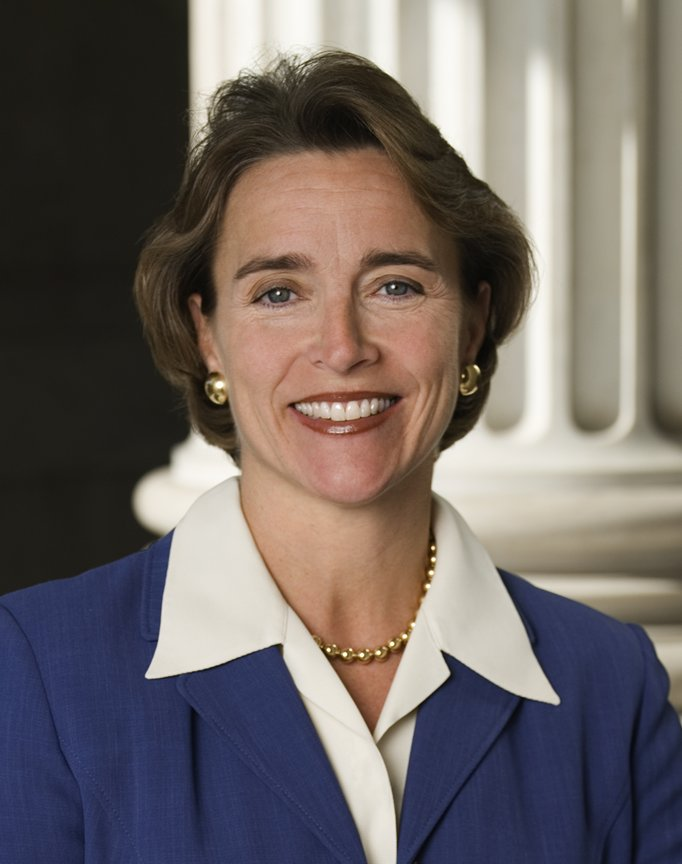
Blanche Lincoln

- Blanche Lincoln, U.S Senator from Arkansas (1999–2011); U.S. Representative from AR-1 (1993–1999) (later endorsed Joe Biden)

=== U.S. representatives ===
==== Current ====
- Linda Sánchez, U.S. Representative from CA-38 since 2003 (later endorsed Joe Biden)
- Angie Craig, U.S. Representative from MN-02 since 2019 (later endorsed Joe Biden)
- Dean Phillips, U.S. Representative from MN-03 since 2019 (later endorsed Joe Biden)
- Collin Peterson, U.S. Representative from MN-07 since 1991 (later endorsed Joe Biden)
- Betty McCollum, U.S. Representative from MN-04 since 2001 (later endorsed Joe Biden)

==== Former ====
- Bill Luther, U.S. Representative from MN-06 (1995–2003) (later endorsed Joe Biden)
- Lynn Schenk, U.S. Representative from CA-49 (1993–1995) (later endorsed Joe Biden)
- Joe Sestak, U.S. Representative from PA-07 (2007–2011) and former 2020 presidential candidate (later endorsed Joe Biden)
- Vic Snyder, U.S. Representative from AR-02 (1997 to 2011)

=== Sub-Cabinet-level officials ===
==== Former ====
- Roxanne Conlin, former U.S. Attorney for the Southern District of Iowa (1977–1981)

=== U.S. ambassadors ===
==== Former ====
- Gordon Giffin, former U.S. ambassador to Canada (1997–2001)
- Samuel D. Heins, former U.S. ambassador to Norway (2016–2017)
- Samuel L. Kaplan, former U.S. ambassador to Morocco (2009–2013)
- James B. Smith, former U.S. ambassador to Saudi Arabia (2009–2013)

== State officials ==
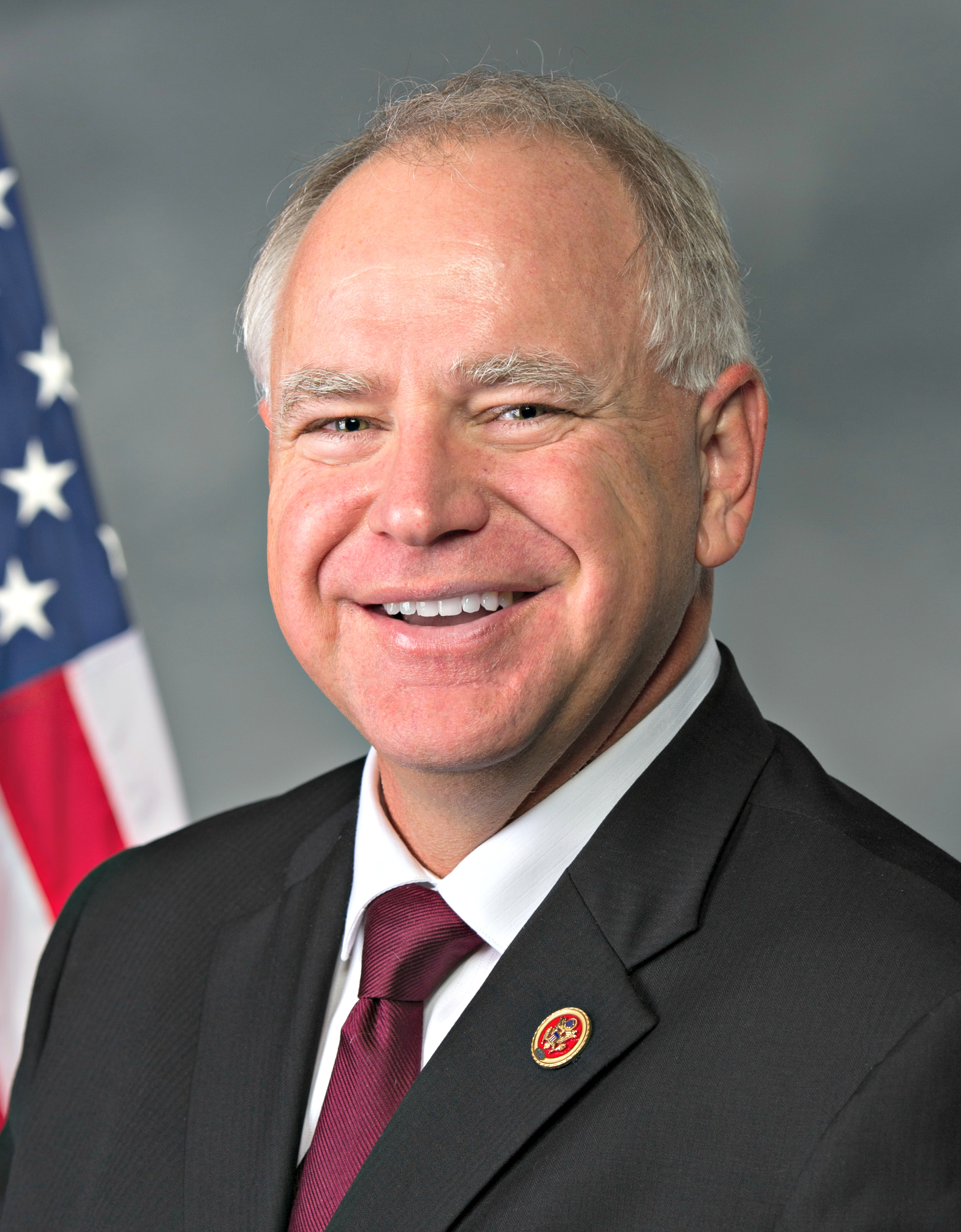
Tim Walz

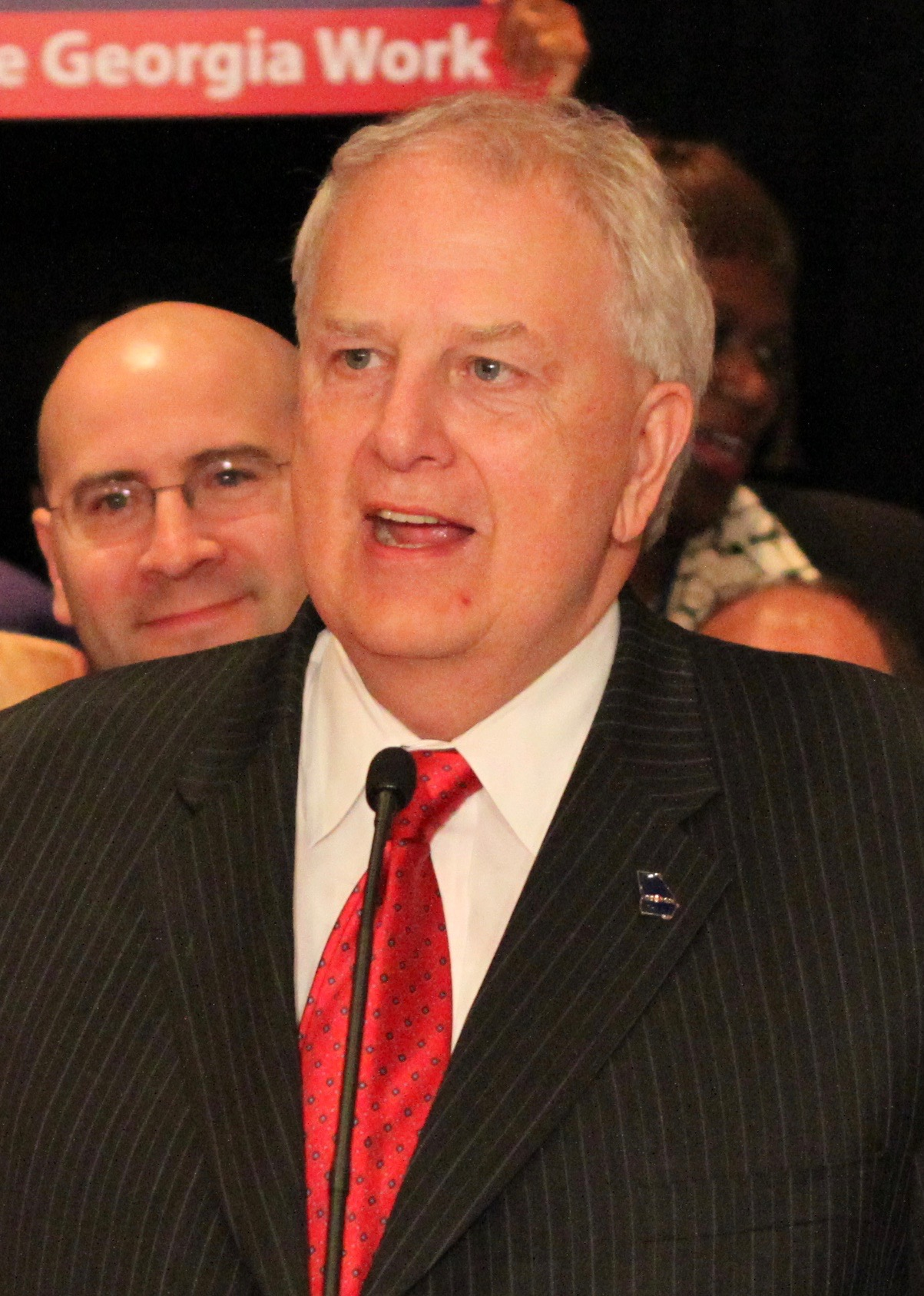
Roy Barnes

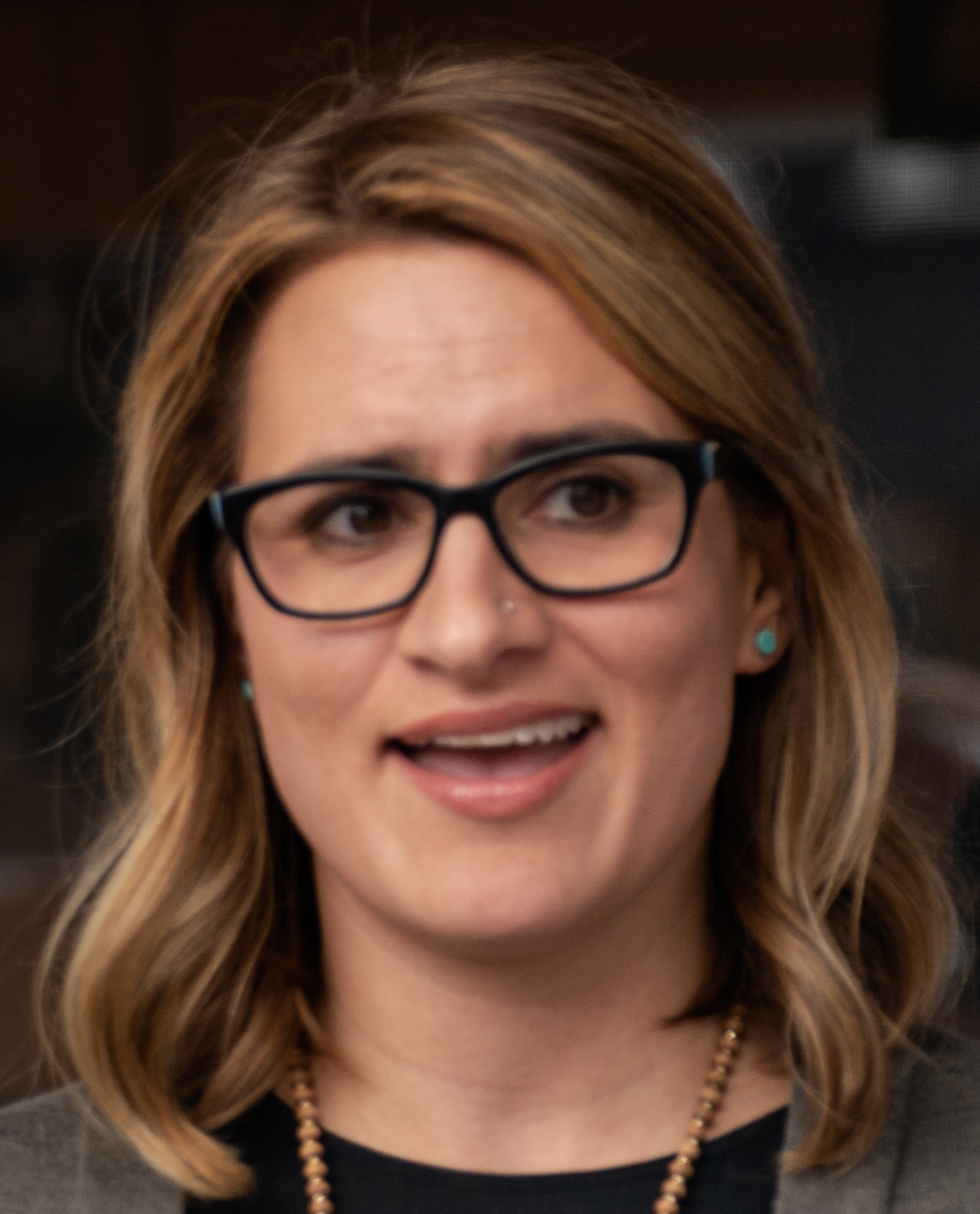
Peggy Flanagan

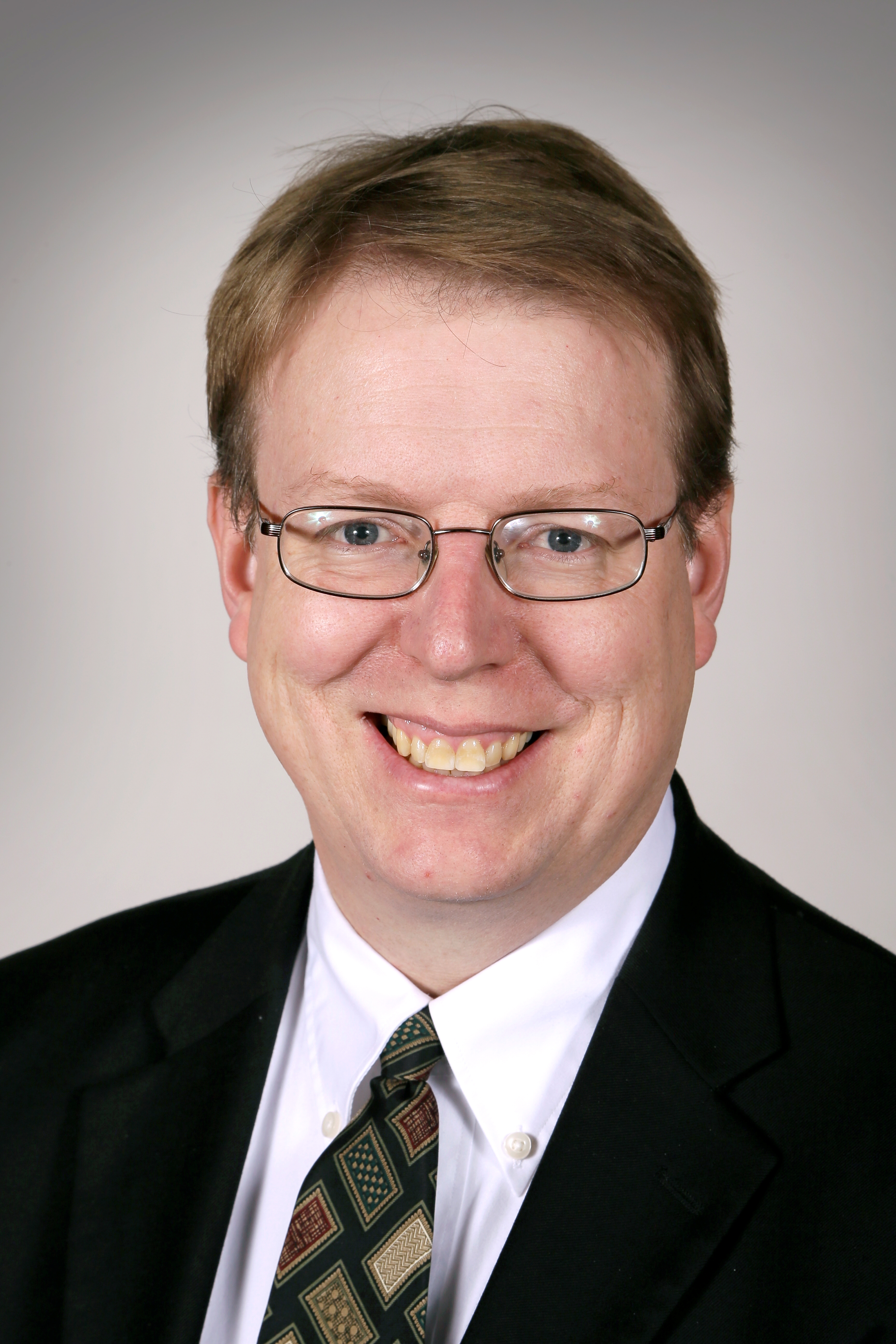
Rob Hogg

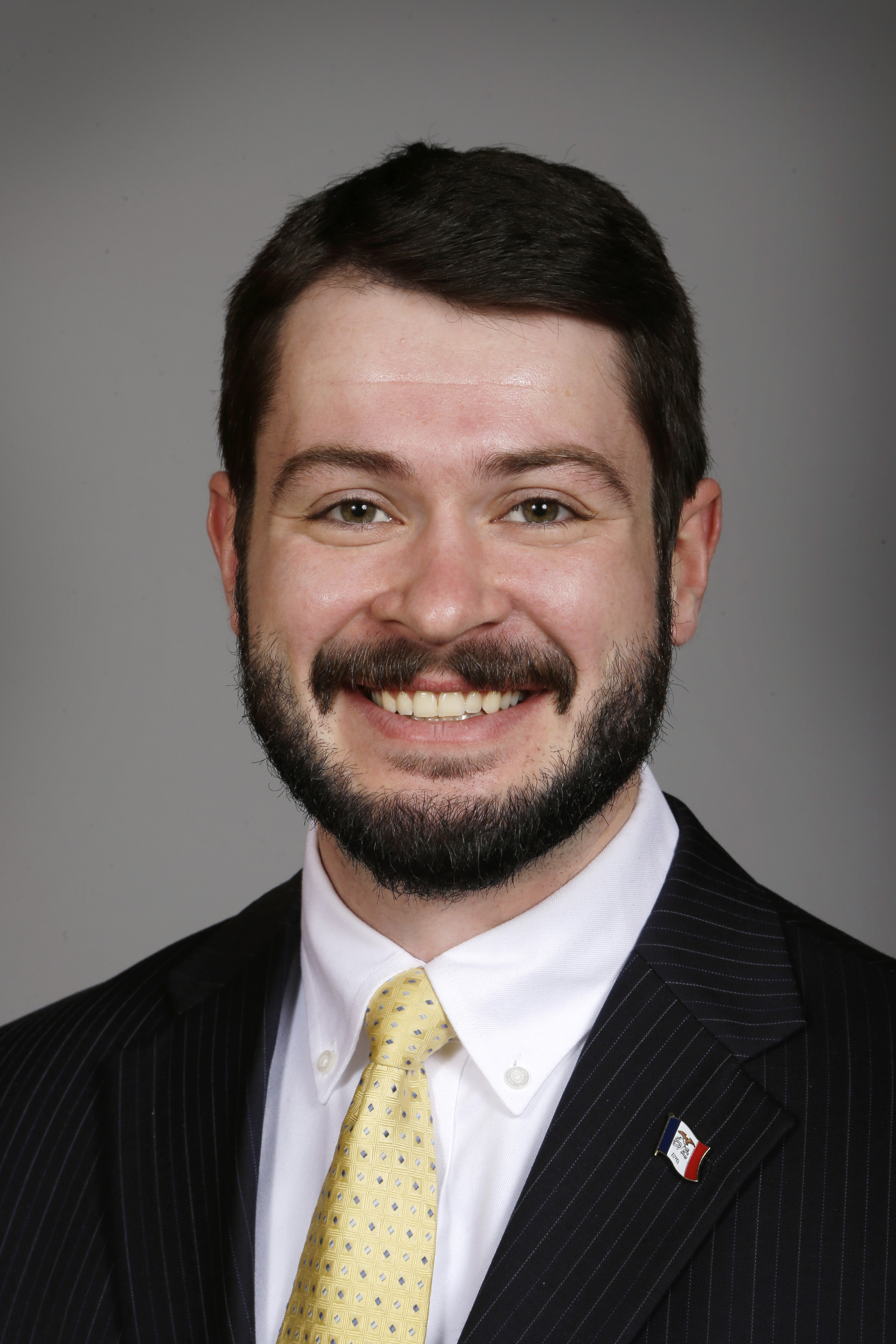
Chris Hall

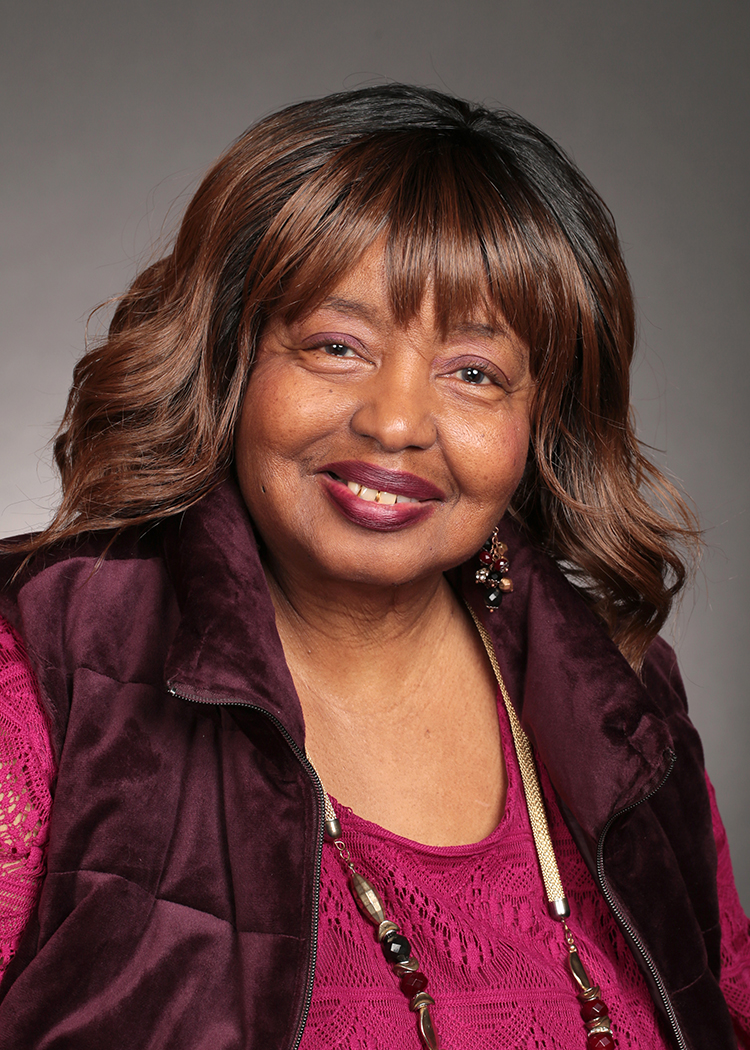
Ruth Ann Gaines

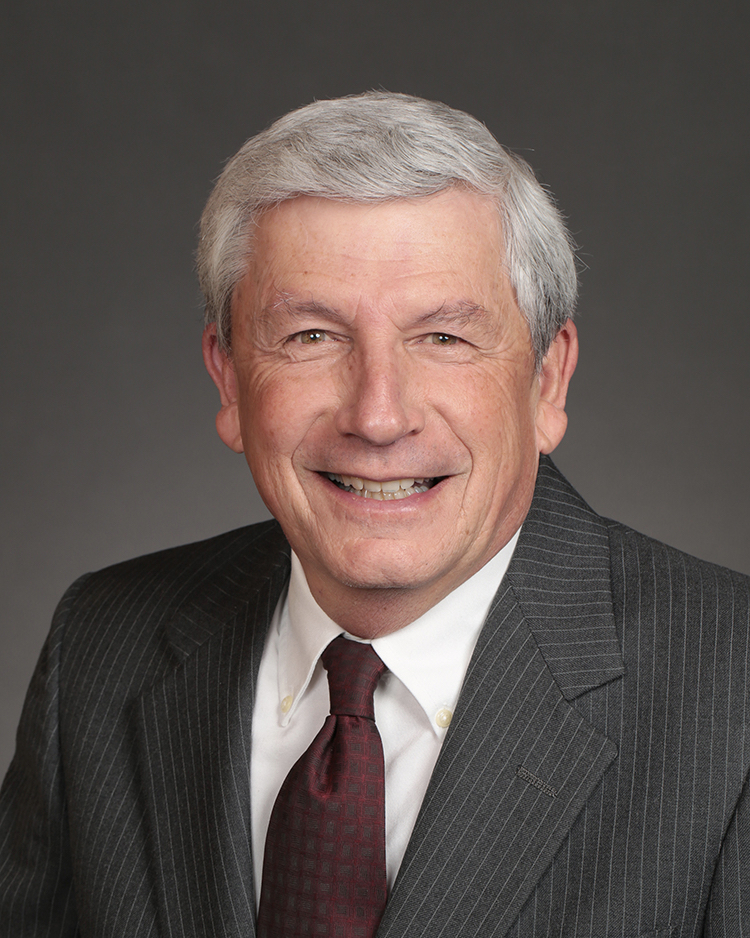
Andy McKean

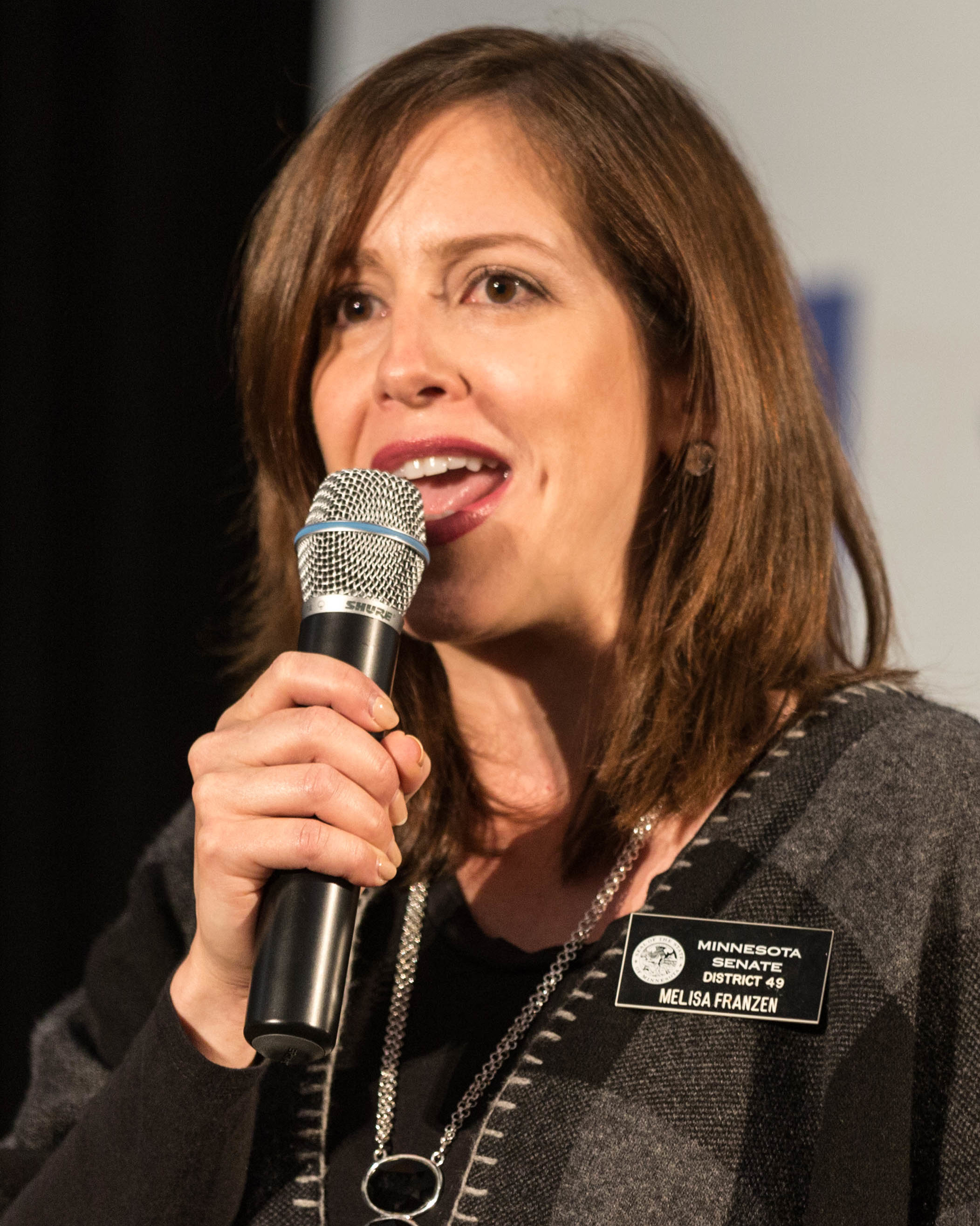
Melisa Franzen

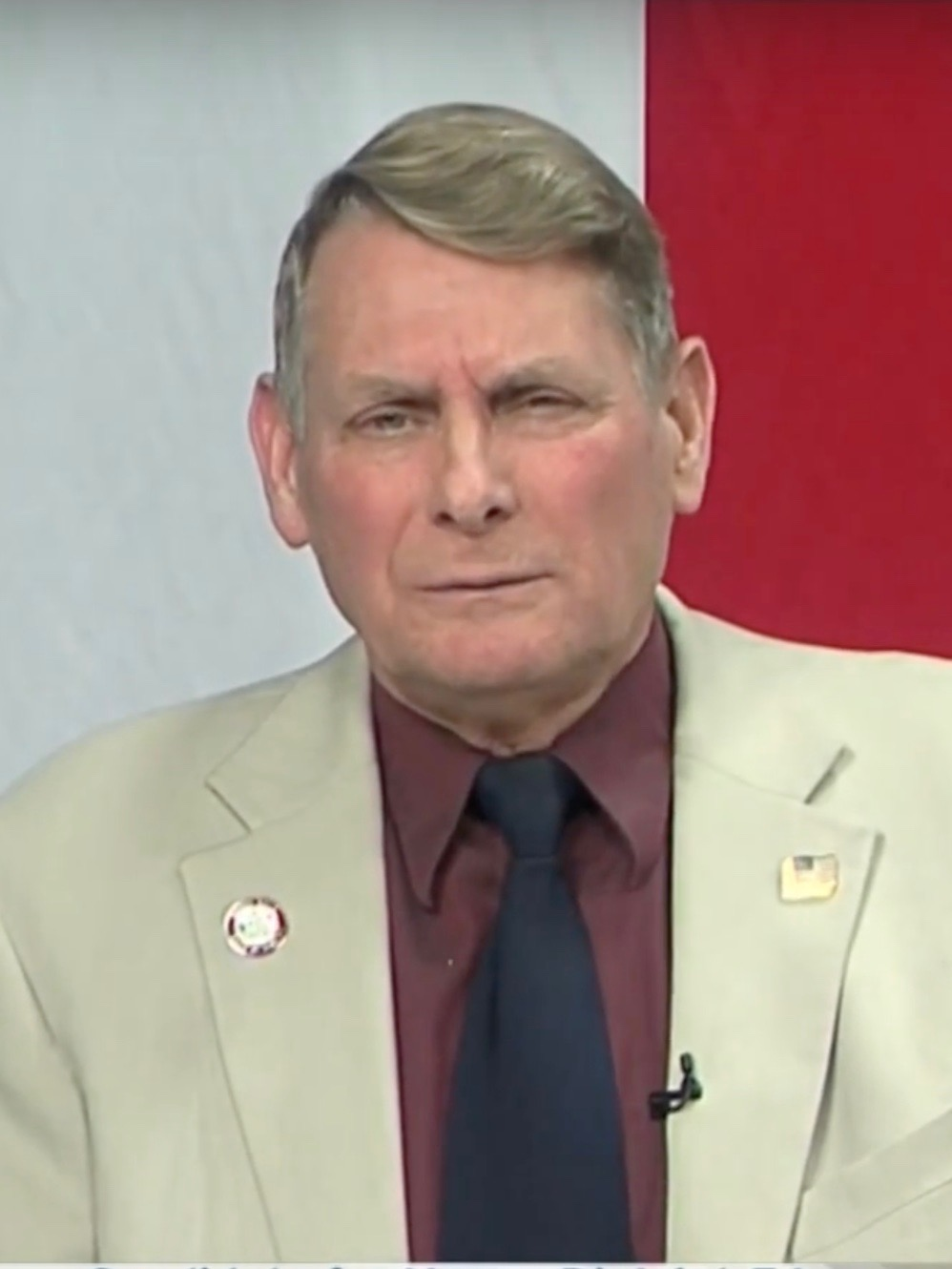
John Persell

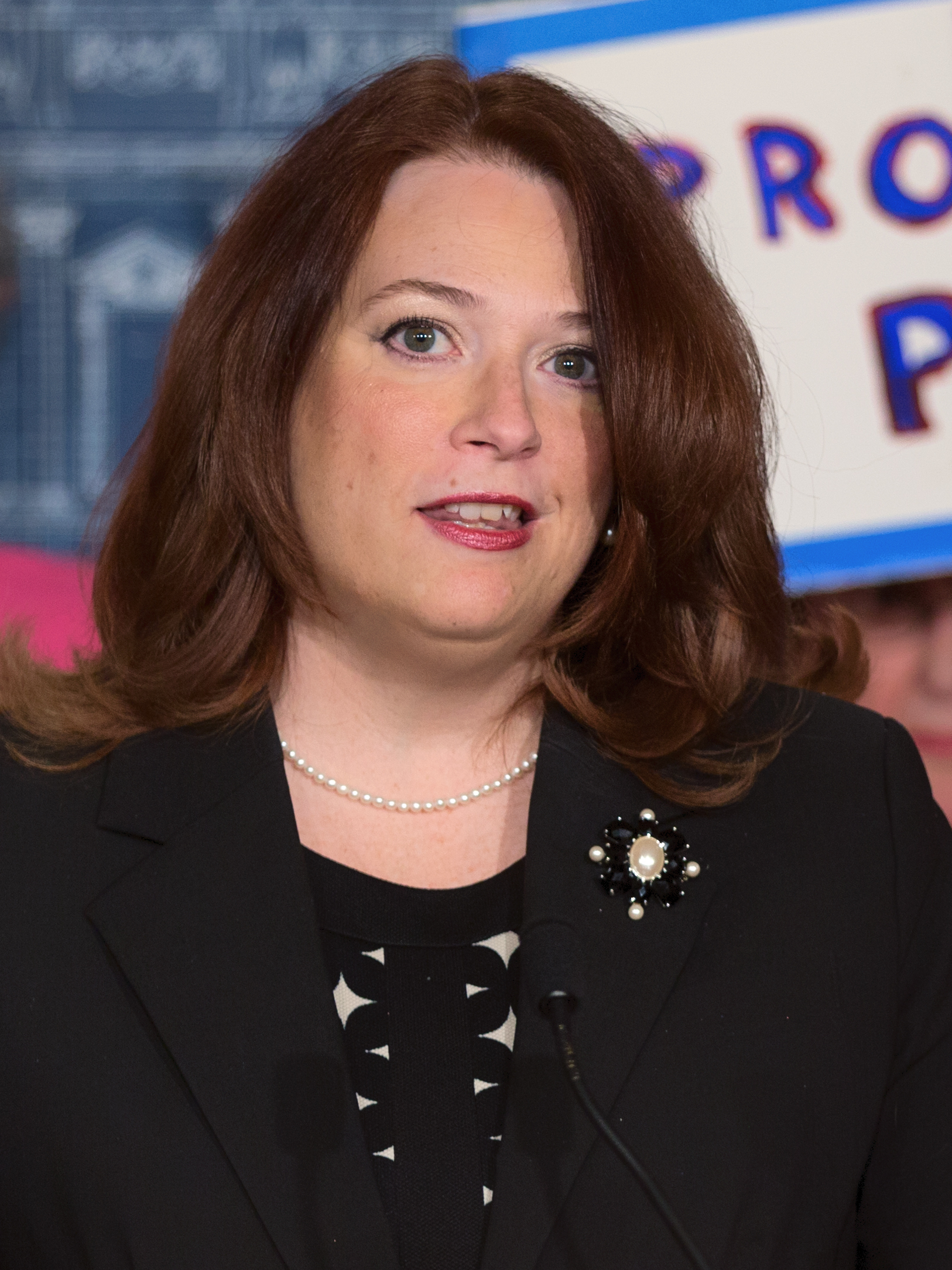
Laurie Halverson

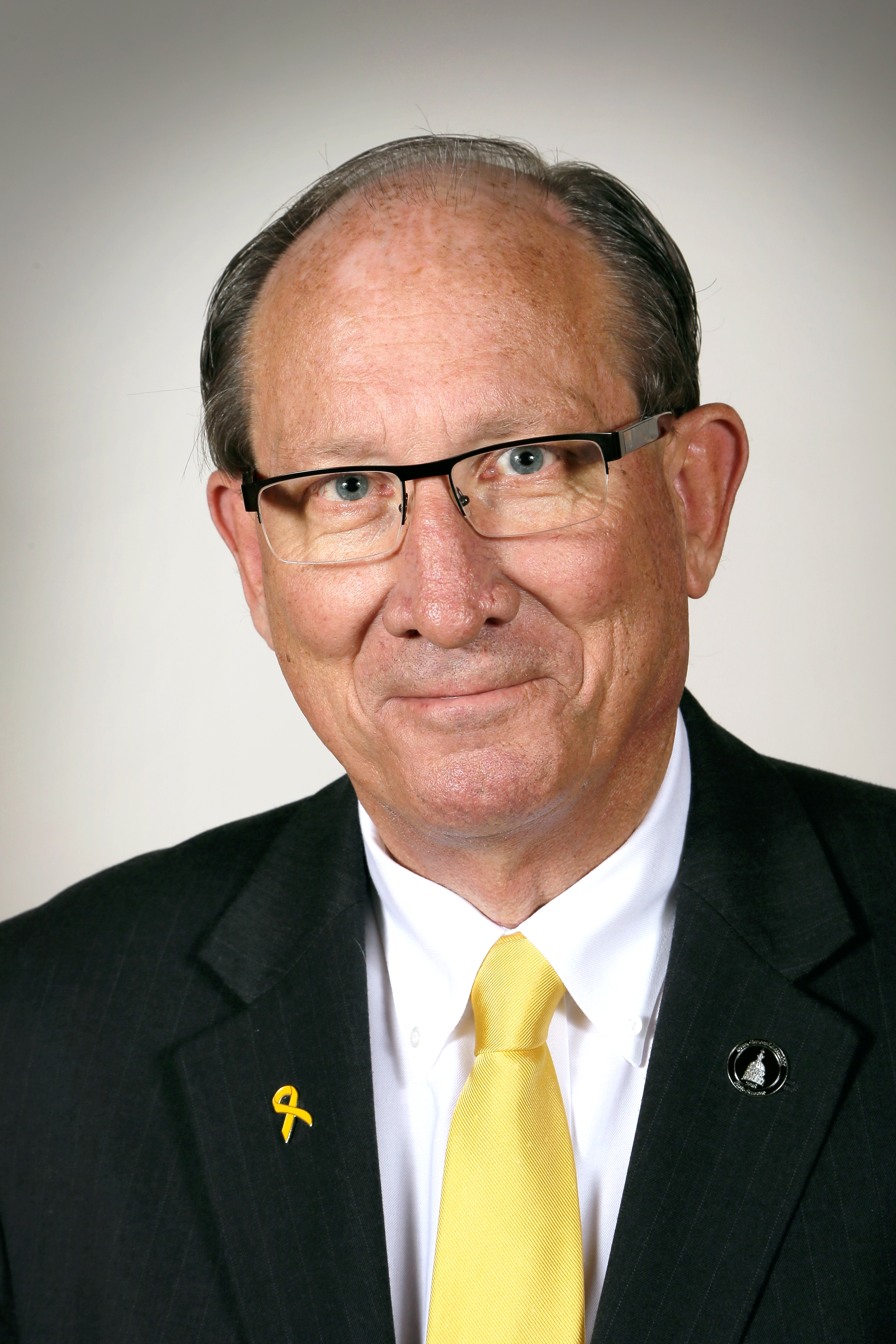
David Johnson

=== Governors ===
==== Current ====
- Tim Walz, Governor of Minnesota since 2019; former U.S. Representative from MN-01 (2007–2019) (later endorsed Joe Biden)

==== Former ====
- Roy Barnes, former governor of Georgia (1999–2003) (later endorsed Joe Biden)

=== Statewide executive officials ===
==== Current ====
- Julie Blaha, Minnesota State Auditor since 2019
- Peggy Flanagan, Lieutenant Governor of Minnesota since 2019 (later endorsed Joe Biden)
- Debora Pignatelli, New Hampshire Executive Councilwoman from District 5 from 2004 to 2010, from 2012 to 2014 and since 2019; former New Hampshire State Senator from District 13 (1992–2002); former New Hampshire State Representative (1986–1992) and former Assistant Minority Leader in the New Hampshire House of Representatives
- Peter Franchot, Comptroller of Maryland since 2007

==== Former ====
- Joe Foster, former Attorney General of New Hampshire (2013–2017); former New Hampshire State Senator from District 13 (2002–2008) and New Hampshire State Senate majority leader (2006–2008); former New Hampshire State Representative (1995–1998)
- David Frederickson, former Agriculture Commissioner of Minnesota (2011–2019); former Minnesota State Senator from District 20 (1987–1993)
- Skip Humphrey, former Attorney General of Minnesota (1983–1999)

=== State legislators ===
==== Current ====
- Tippi McCullough, Arkansas State Representative for District 33 since 2019
- Alex Bergstein, Connecticut State Senator from District 36 since 2019
- Liz Mathis, Iowa State Senator from District 34 since 2011
- Todd Taylor, Iowa State Senator for District 35 since 2019; Iowa State Representative for District 50 (1995–2013) and for District 70 (2013–2019)
- Kevin Kinney, Iowa State Senator for District 39 since 2015
- Rich Taylor, Iowa State Senator for District 42 since 2013
- Rob Hogg, Iowa State Senator for District 33 since 2007; former Iowa State Representative from District 38 (2003–2007)
- Chris Hall, Iowa State Representative from District 13 since 2013 and for District 2 (2011–2013) (previously endorsed Beto O'Rourke)
- Charlie McConkey, Iowa State Representative for District 15 since 2015(previously endorsed Cory Booker)
- Ruth Ann Gaines, Iowa State Representative from District 32 since 2011
- Marti Anderson, Iowa State Representative from District 36 since 2013
- Karin Derry, Iowa State Representative from District 38 since 2019
- Ross Wilburn, Iowa State Representative from District 46 since 2019 (previously endorsed Kamala Harris)
- Sharon Steckman, Iowa State Representative for District 53 since 2009
- Andy McKean, Iowa State Representative from District 58 since 2017
- Dave Williams, Iowa State Representative for District 60 since 2019
- Bruce Bearinger, Iowa State Representative for District 63 since 2013 (previously endorsed Steve Bullock)
- Molly Donahue, Iowa State Representative for District 68 since 2019
- Cindy Winckler, Iowa State Representative for District 44 (2001–2003) and for District 86 since 2003
- Monica Kurth, Iowa State Representative from District 89 since 2017 (previously endorsed Cory Booker)
- Michele Meyer, Maine State Representative from District 2
- Tom Bakk, Minnesota State Senator from District 6 (2003–2013) and from District 3 since 2013; Minnesota Senate Minority Leader (2011–2013) and since 2017; former Minnesota Senate Majority Leader (2013–2017); former Minnesota State Representative from District 6A (1995–2003)
- Kent Eken, Minnesota State Senator from District 4 since 2013; former Minnesota State Representative from District 2A (2003–2013)
- Nick Frentz, Minnesota State Senator from District 19 since 2017
- Dan Sparks, Minnesota State Senator from District 27 since 2019
- John Hoffman, Minnesota State Senator from District 36 since 2013
- Jerry Newton, Minnesota State Senator from District 37 since 2017; former Minnesota State Representative from District 49B (2009–2011) and District 37A (2013–2017)
- Jason Isaacson, Minnesota State Senator from District 42 since 2017; former Minnesota State Representative from District 42B (2013–2017)
- Chuck Wiger, Minnesota State Senator from District 55 (1997–2013) and from District 43 since 2013
- Ann Rest, Minnesota State Senator from District 46 (2001–2013) and from District 45 since 2013; former Minnesota State Representative from District 46A (1985–2001)
- Chris Eaton, Minnesota State Senator from District 46 (2011–2013) and from District 40 since 2013
- Ron Latz, Minnesota State Senator from District 44 (2007–2013) and from District 46 since 2013; former Minnesota State Representative from District 44B (2003–2007)
- Steve Cwodzinski, Minnesota State Senator from District 48 since 2017
- Melisa Franzen, Minnesota State Senator from District 49 since 2013
- Melissa Halvorson Wiklund, Minnesota State Senator from District 50 since 2013
- Matt Klein, Minnesota State Senator from District 52 since 2017
- Greg Clausen, Minnesota State Senator from District 53 since 2013
- Susan Kent, Minnesota State Senator from District 53 since 2013
- Karla Bigham, Minnesota State Senator from District 54 since 2018; former Minnesota State Representative from District 57A (2007–2011)
- Matt Little, Minnesota State Senator from District 58 since 2017
- Kari Dziedzic, Minnesota State Senator from District 59 (2012–2013) and from District 60 since 2013
- Patricia Torres Ray, Minnesota State Senator from District 62 (2007–2013) and from District 63 since 2013
- Dick Cohen, Minnesota State Senator from District 64 since 1987; former Minnesota State Representative from District 63B (1977–1979) and from District 64B (1983–1987)
- Sandy Pappas, Minnesota State Senator from District 65 since 1991 and former President of the Minnesota Senate (2013–2017); former Minnesota State Representative from District 65B (1985–1991)
- Foung Hawj, Minnesota State Senator from District 67 since 2013
- Melissa Hortman, Minnesota State Representative for District 47B (2005–2013) and District 36B since 2013 and Speaker of the Minnesota House of Representatives since 2019; former Minority Leader of the Minnesota House of Representatives (2017–2019)
- Ryan Winkler, Minnesota State Representative for District 44B (2007–2013) and for District 46A from 2013 to 2015 and since 2019; Majority Leader of the Minnesota House of Representatives since 2019
- Ben Lien, Minnesota State Representative for District 4A since 2013
- John Persell, Minnesota State Representative for District 4A (2009–2013) and District 5A from 2013 to 2017 and since 2019
- Jennifer Schultz, Minnesota State Representative for District 7A since 2017
- Dan Wolgamott, Minnesota State Representative for District 14B since 2019
- Jeff Brand, Minnesota State Representative for District 19A since 2019
- Jack Considine, Minnesota State Representative for District 19B since 2015
- Duane Sauke, Minnesota State Representative for District 25B since 2017
- Kelly Morrison, Minnesota State Representative for District 33B since 2019
- Zack Stephenson, Minnesota State Representative for District 36A since 2019
- Kristin Bahner, Minnesota State Representative for District 39B since 2019
- Mike Nelson, Minnesota State Representative for District 46A (2003–2013) and District 40A since 2013
- Peter Fischer, Minnesota State Representative for District 43A since 2013
- Connie Bernardy, Minnesota State Representative for District 48B (2001–2003), District 51B (2003–2006), District 41A since 2013
- Kelly Moller, Minnesota State Representative for District 42A since 2019
- Ginny Klevorn, Minnesota State Representative for District 44A since 2019
- Patty Acomb, Minnesota State Representative for District 44B since 2019
- Mike Freiberg, Minnesota State Representative for District 45B since 2013
- Cheryl Youakim, Minnesota State Representative for District 46B since 2015
- Laurie Pryor, Minnesota State Representative for District 48A since 2017
- Heather Edelson, Minnesota State Representative for District 49A since 2019
- Steve Elkins, Minnesota State Representative for District 49B since 2019
- Sandra Masin, Minnesota State Representative for District 38A (2007–2011) and District 51A since 2013
- Laurie Halverson, Minnesota State Representative for District 51B since 2013
- Brad Tabke, Minnesota State Representative for District 55A since 2019
- Alice Mann, Minnesota State Representative for District 56B since 2019
- Robert Bierman, Minnesota State Representative for District 57A since 2019
- John Huot, Minnesota State Representative for District 57B since 2019
- Mohamud Noor, Minnesota State Representative for District 60B since 2019
- Frank Hornstein, Minnesota State Representative for District 60B (2003–2013) and District 61A since 2013
- Michael Pedersen, New Hampshire State Representative from the Hillsborough District 32 (2018–present) (previously endorsed Elizabeth Warren)
- Latha Mangipudi, New Hampshire State Representative from Hillsborough District 35 since 2013 (previously endorsed Cory Booker)
- Linn Opderbecke, New Hampshire State Representative from the Strafford District 15 since 2016 (previously endorsed Cory Booker)
- Dominick J. Ruggerio, President of the Rhode Island Senate since 2017 and Rhode Island State Senator from District 4 since 1984
- Nicholas Mattiello, Speaker of the Rhode Island House of Representatives since 2014; Rhode Island State Representative from District 15 since 2007 (previously endorsed Joe Biden)
- Creigh Deeds, Virginia State Senator since 2001
- Janet Howell, Virginia State Senator since 1992

==== Former ====
- David Johnson, former Iowa State Senator from District 1 (2003–2019; Iowa State Representative from District 6 (1997–2003) (independent)
- Roger Stewart, former Iowa State Senator for District 13 (2003–2010)
- Swati Dandekar, former U.S. Executive Director of the Asian Development Bank (2016–2017); former member of the Iowa Utilities Board (2011–2013); former Iowa State Senator from District 18 (2009–2011); former Iowa State Representative from District 36 (2003–2009)
- Patrick J. Deluhery, former Iowa State Senator for District 41 (1979–1983) and Districts 22 and 21 (1983–1993)
- Bill Gannon, former Iowa State Representative for District 66 (1965–1971) and former Iowa House of Representatives Minority Floor Leader (previously endorsed Steve Bullock)
- Linda Nelson, former Iowa State Representative and former Chair of the Pottawattamie County Democrats
- Patrick Gill, former Iowa State Representative for District 2 (1991–1994)
- ~~John Wittneben, former Iowa State Representative for District 7 (2011–2013)~~ (switched endorsement to Pete Buttigieg)
- Marcella Frevert, former Iowa State Representative for District 8 (1997–2003)
- William Witt, former Iowa State Representative for District 23 (1993–2003)
- Darrell Hanson, former Iowa State Representative for District 18 (1973–1983), District 48 (1983–1993) and District 27 (1993–1995) (Republican)
- Steve Falck, former Iowa State Representative for District 28 (1997–2002)
- Kay Halloran, former Iowa State Representative for District 49 (1983–1992) and from District 56 (1997–2001); former Mayor of Cedar Rapids (2006–2009)
- Nancy Dunkel, former Iowa State Representative for District 57 (2013–2017)
- Edgar Bittle, former Iowa State Representative for District 66 (1973–1977) (Republican)
- Sally Stutsman, former Iowa State Representative for District 77 (2013–2017)
- Elaine Lauterborn, former New Hampshire State Representative (2008–2010); Deputy Mayor of Rochester, New Hampshire
- Patricia "Ricia" McMahon, former New Hampshire State Representative from Merrimack District 3 (2004–2010)

== Local and municipal officials ==
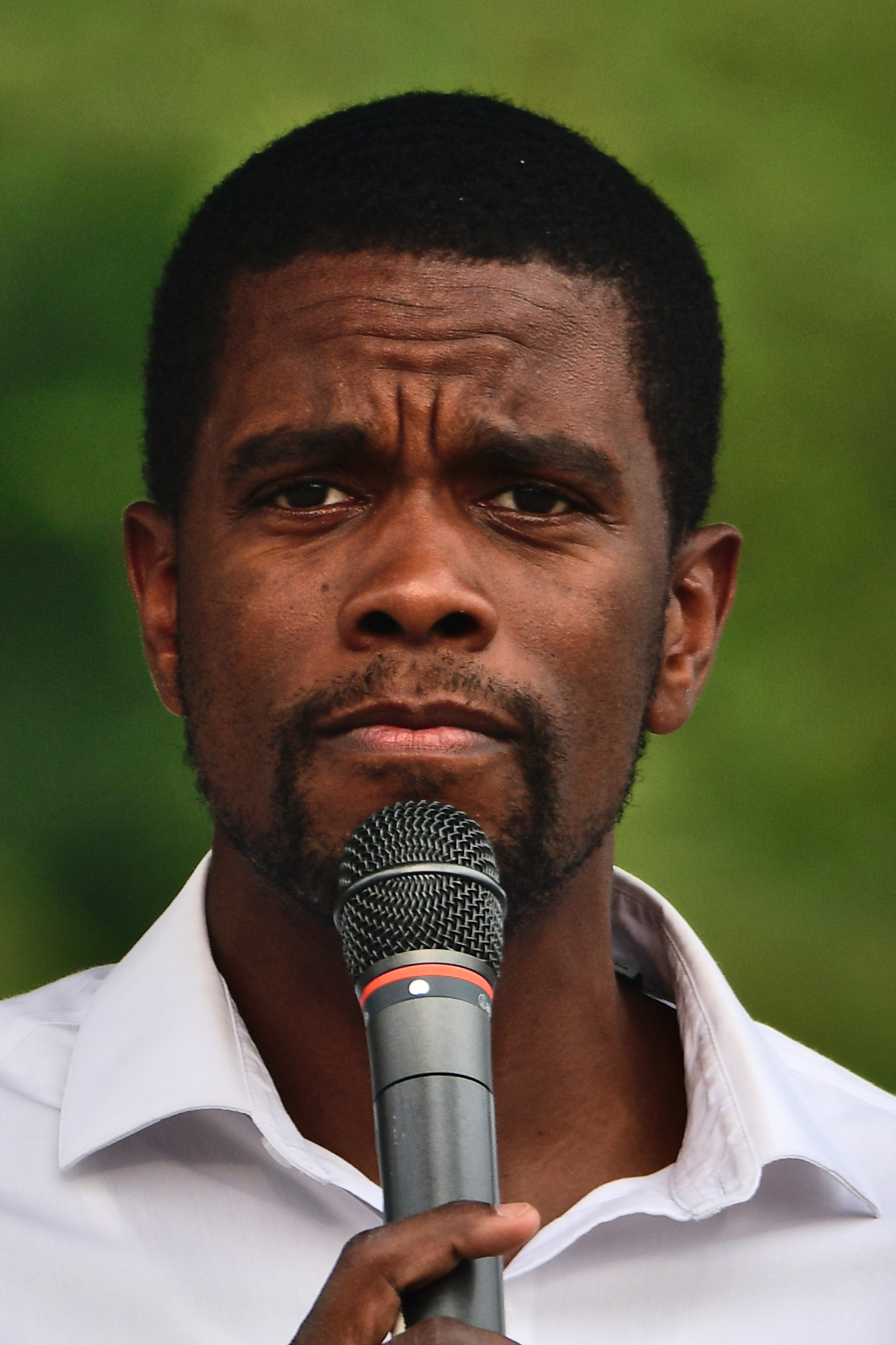
Melvin Carter

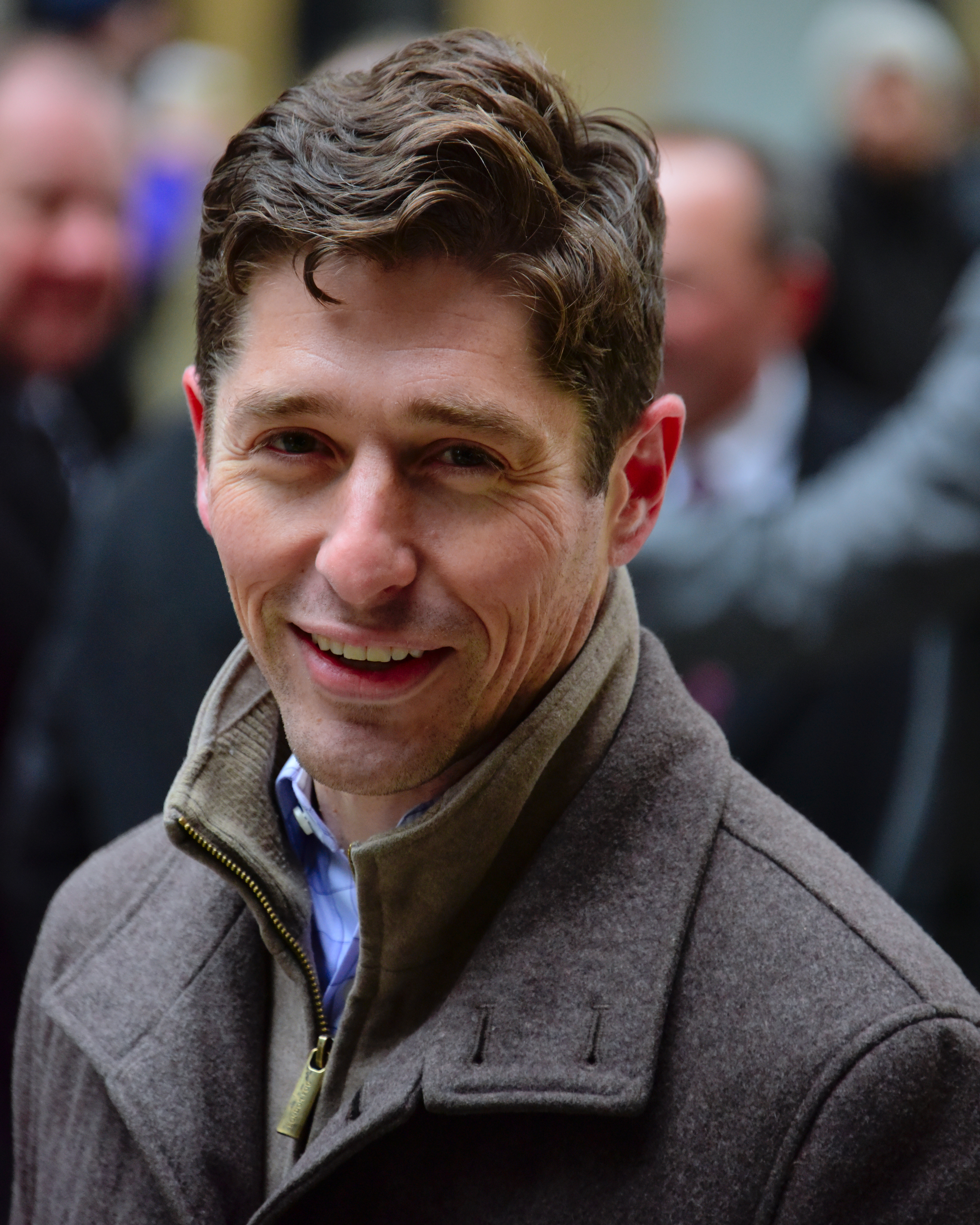
Jacob Frey

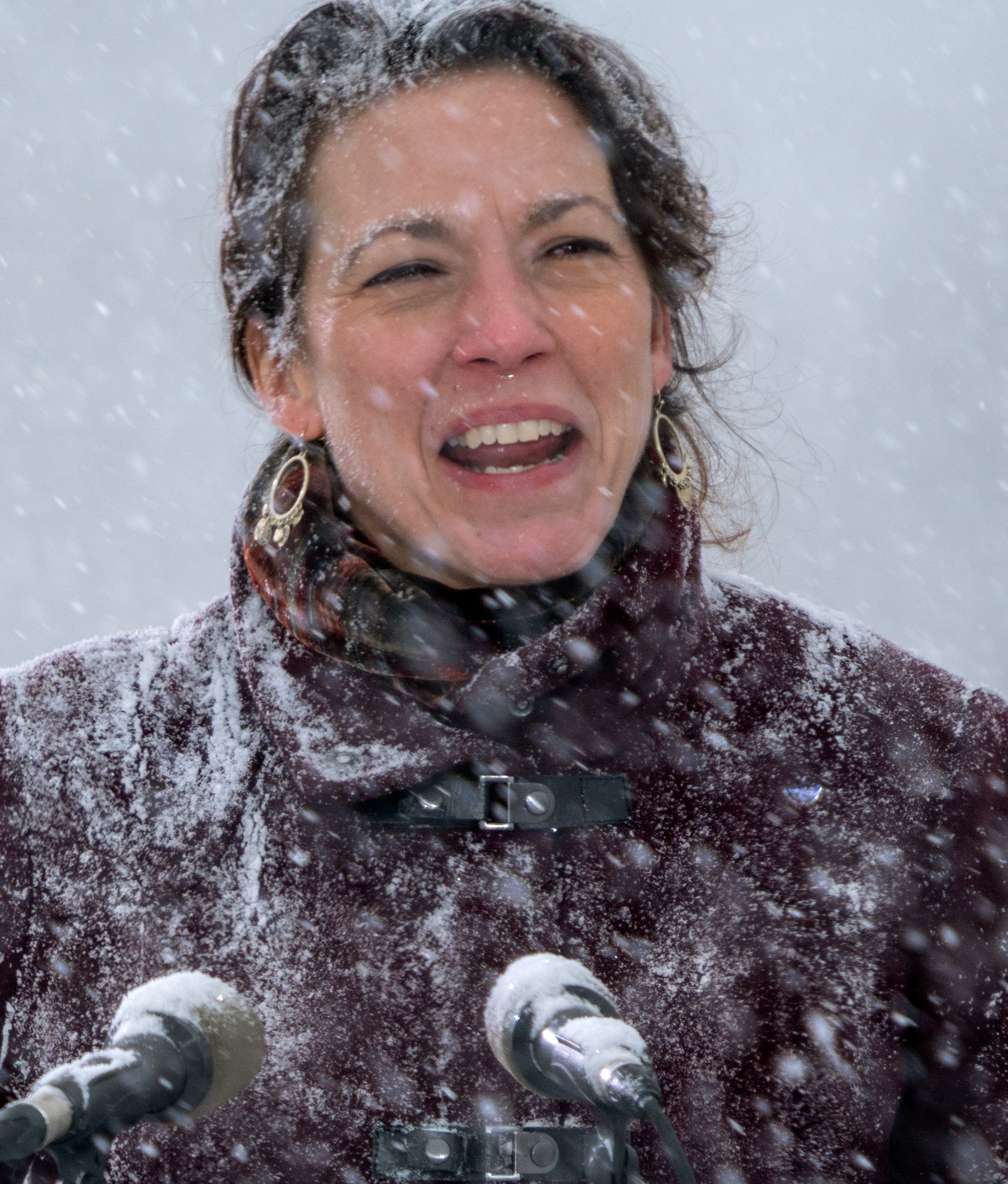
Emily Larson

=== Current ===
- Melvin Carter, Mayor of Saint Paul, Minnesota since 2018
- Jacob Frey, Mayor of Minneapolis, Minnesota since 2018
- Emily Larson, Mayor of Duluth, Minnesota since 2016

== Party officials ==
=== Current ===
- Norm Sterzenbach, Iowa Caucus Advisor for Klobuchar's campaign since 2019; former Executive Director of the Iowa Democratic Party (2006–2013); former director of Beto O'Rourke's 2020 campaign (2019) (previously endorsed Beto O'Rourke)

=== Former ===
- Andy McGuire, former Chair of the Iowa Democratic Party (2015–2017)

== Notable individuals ==
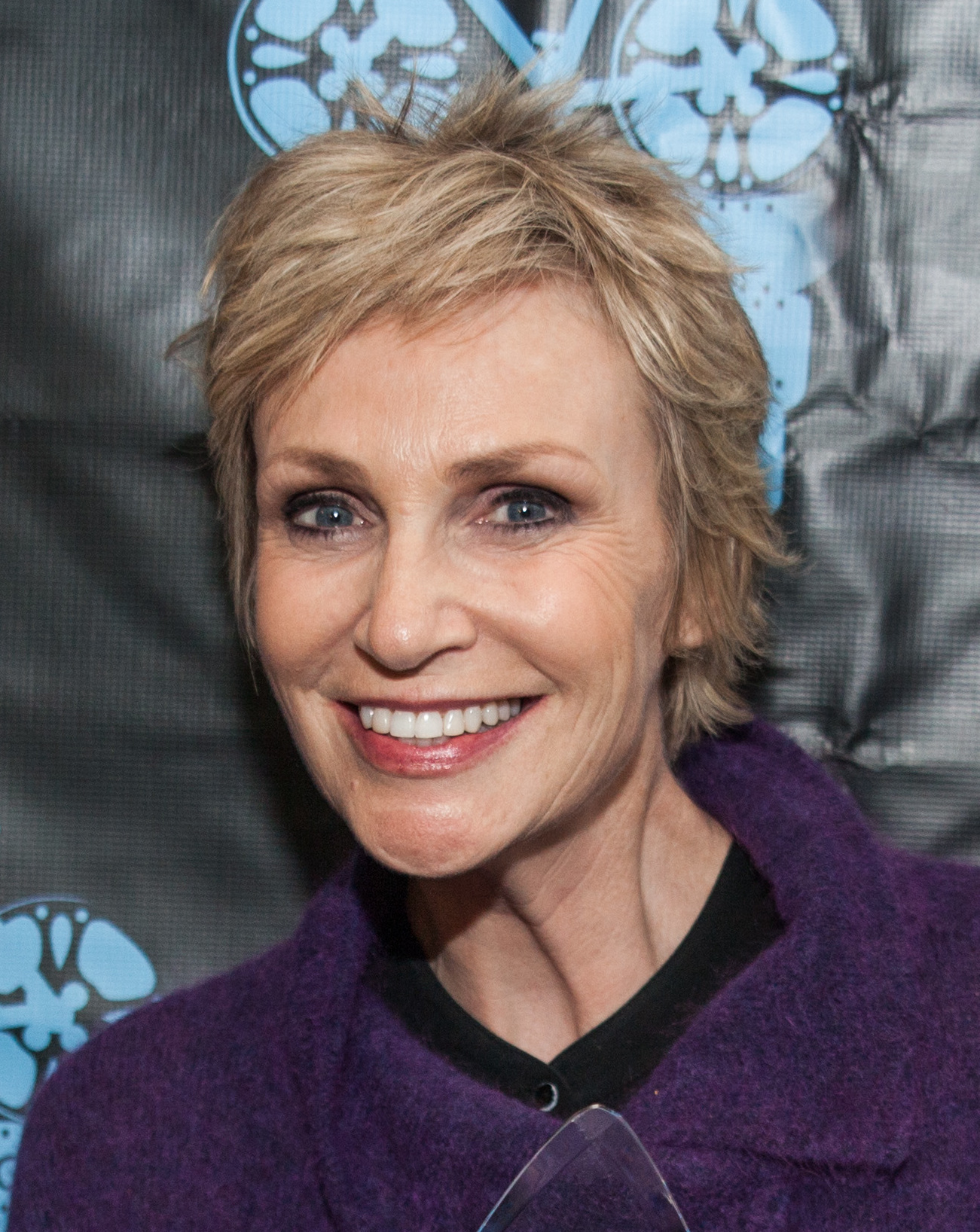
Jane Lynch

=== Academics, experts, and writers ===
- John Bessler, attorney and academic; Klobuchar's husband
- Jim Klobuchar, journalist, author, columnist, and travel guide; Klobuchar's father

=== Athletes and sports figures ===
- Phill Drobnick, curler

=== Entertainers ===
- Clay Aiken, singer, former nominee for the North Carolina's 2nd congressional district, and LGBT activist (switched from earlier endorsement of Joe Biden)
- Greg Berlanti, writer, producer and director (also endorsed Pete Buttigieg)
- Lorraine Gary, actress
- Teri Hatcher, actress
- Bill Maher, comedian and political commentator
- Jay Leno, comedian and talk show host
- Jane Lynch, actress

=== Political activists ===
- Melanie Benjamin, Chief Executive of the Mille Lacs Band of Ojibwe, 2000–2008 and since 2012
- Amy Siskind, author and activist
- Charlie Vig, Chairman of the Shakopee Mdewakanton Sioux Community since 2012, former Vice Chairman of the Shakopee Mdewakanton Sioux Community (2012)

== Organizations ==
=== Newspapers ===
- Iowa City Press-Citizen
- New Hampshire Union Leader
- Quad-City Times
- Seacoast Media Group
- The New York Times (co-endorsement with Elizabeth Warren)
- The Keene Sentinel
- Las Vegas Sun and Las Vegas Weekly (co-endorsement with Joe Biden)
- The Mercury News and East Bay Times
- Houston Chronicle
- San Francisco Chronicle
- The Seattle Times
- Bangor Daily News
