= Steve Hansen (politician) =

American politician (born 1955)

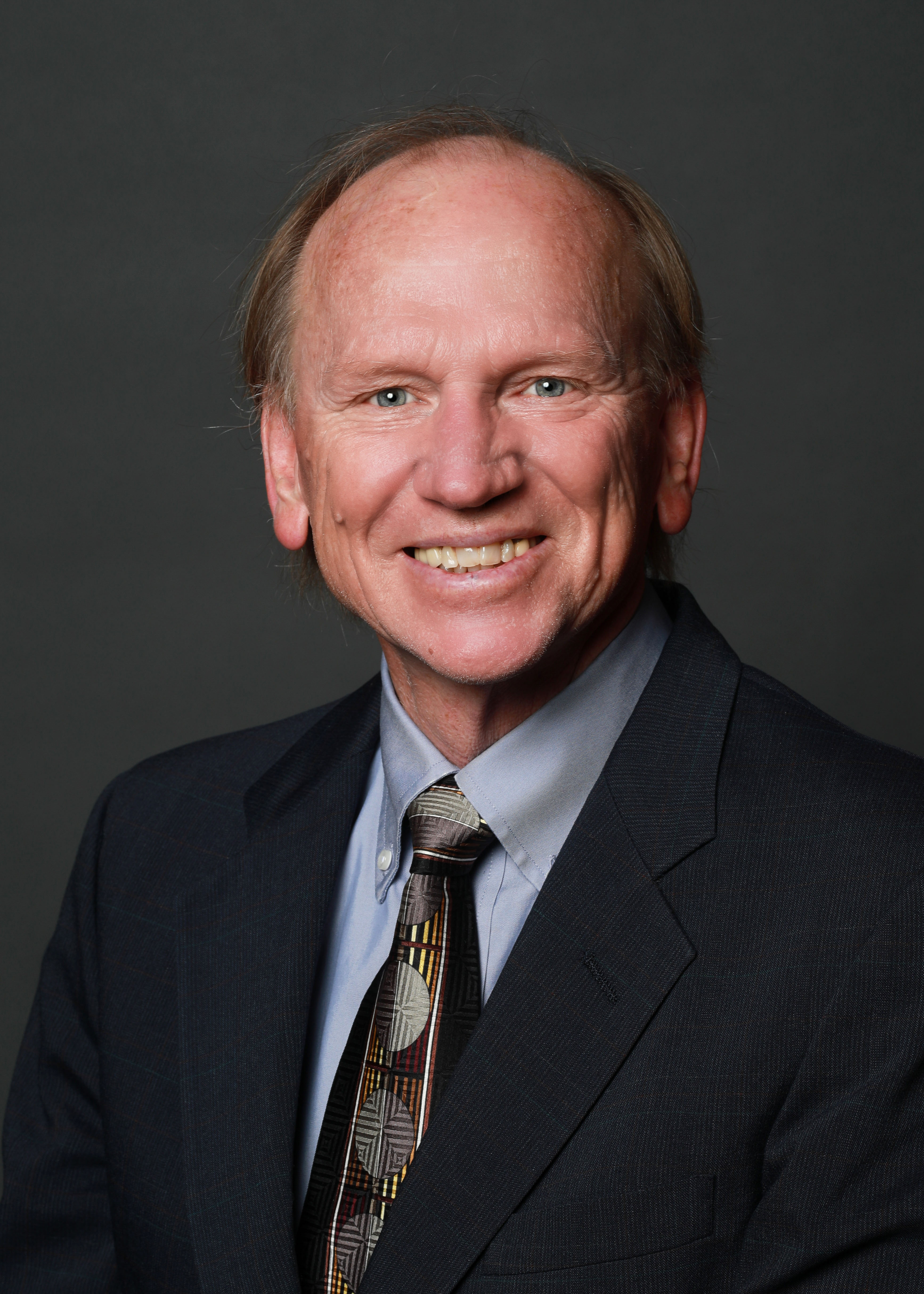

Member of the Iowa House of Representatives from the 14th district
- In office January 11, 2021 – January 8, 2023
- Preceded by: Timothy Kacena
- Succeeded by: Jacob Bossman

Member of the Iowa Senate from the 1st district
- In office January 9, 1995 – January 12, 2003
- Preceded by: Al Sturgeon
- Succeeded by: Steve Warnstadt

Member of the Iowa House of Representatives from the 1st district
- In office January 12, 1987 – January 8, 1995
- Preceded by: James D. O'Kane
- Succeeded by: Ronald Nutt

Personal details
- Born: February 5, 1955 (age 71) Sioux City, Iowa, U.S.
- Party: Democratic
- Education: Morningside College (BA); University of South Dakota (MA)

Steven D. Hansen (born February 5, 1955) is an American politician. He was a member of the Iowa House of Representatives for District 1 from 1987 to 1995. He was then elected to the Iowa Senate from District 1 between 1995 and 2003. Hansen returned to the state house in 2021, representing District 14.

== Early life and education ==
Hansen was born in Sioux City, Iowa on February 5, 1955. He earned a Bachelor of Arts degree in history, political science, and criminal justice from Morningside College and a Master of Arts political science from the University of South Dakota.

== Career ==
Hansen served as a member of the Iowa House of Representatives from 1987 to 1995 and in the Iowa Senate from 1995 to 2003. After leaving the legislature, he worked as director of the Sioux City Public Museum. He was re-elected to the Iowa House in November 2020 and assumed office on January 11, 2021. In the 2022 election cycle, Hansen was redistricted to House District 2, and lost to Robert Henderson.
