= Robert Henderson (American politician) =

American politician

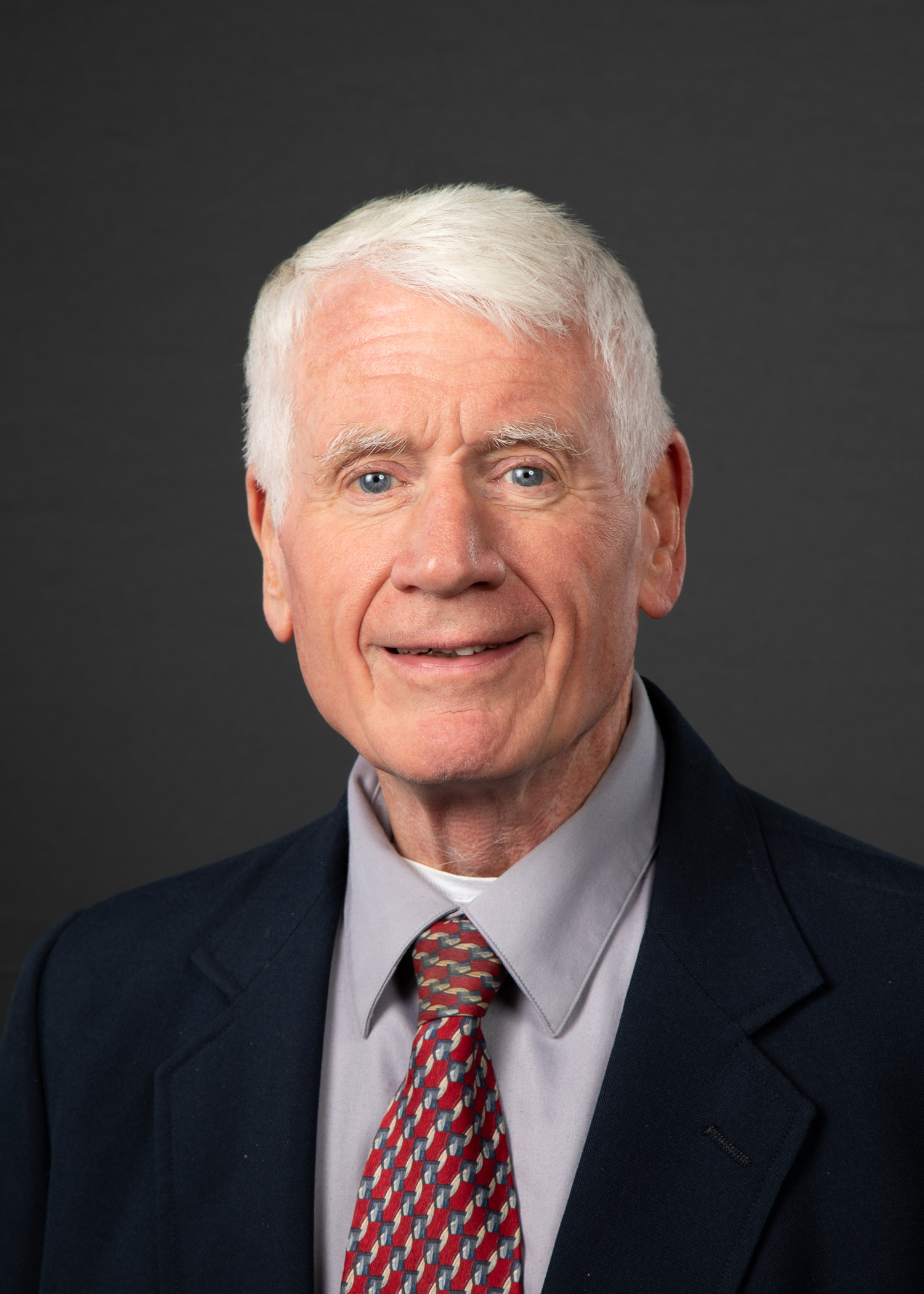

Member of the Iowa House of Representatives from the 2nd district
- Incumbent
- Assumed office 9 January 2023
- Preceded by: Megan Jones

Personal details
- Party: Republican

Robert Henderson is a retired educator and coach, serving in the Iowa House of Representatives.

== Early career ==
Henderson moved to Sioux City, Iowa, in 1989, to accept an assistant coaching position for the Morningside Mustangs football team. He subsequently worked for Penn Corp Financial, before teaching within the Sioux City Community School District.

== Political career ==
Henderson worked for Chuck Grassley as a regional director. He contested a Sioux City School Board election in 2015. This was Henderson's first candidacy for public office. He finished seventh of seven candidates. Shortly after the election, board member Paul Speidel resigned his seat, and Henderson was one of five candidates considered for appointment to the board. Former board member John Meyers was eventually selected.

Henderson campaigned for the District 14 seat in the Iowa House of Representatives in 2016 and 2018, losing both times to Tim Kacena. In 2020, he mounted a third campaign for the district, this time losing to Steve Hansen. In January 2021, Henderson succeeded Suzan Stewart as chair of the Woodbury County branch of the Republican Party. He faced Hansen, who had been redistricted to District 2, for a second time in the 2022 general election, and won the seat.

Iowa House of Representatives
Preceded by Megan Jones	2nd District; 2023 – present	Succeeded by Incumbent
