= Mundie =

Mundie is a surname. Notable people with the surname include:

- Craig Mundie (born 1949), American technology businessman
- J. Norman Mundie (1929–2013), American politician from Iowa

== See also ==
- Mundie & Jensen, defunct architecture firm in Chicago
