= Patrick Gill =

Patrick Gill may refer to:

- Patrick F. Gill (1868–1923), US representative from Missouri
- Patrick Gill (scientist), British physicist
- Patrick Gill (Iowa politician)

== See also ==
- John Creasey (pen name Patrick Gill)
