= Janet Adams =

American politician (born 1937)

Member of the Iowa House of Representatives from the 14th district
- In office January 12, 1987 – January 10, 1993
- Preceded by: Dale M. Cochran
- Succeeded by: J. Norman Mundie

Personal details
- Born: August 30, 1937 (age 88) Webster County, Iowa, U.S.
- Party: Democratic
- Spouse: Ron Adams (m. 1957)
- Children: 7
- Education: Eagle Grove High School; Buena Vista College
- Occupation: Politician

Janet Louise Jeanblanc Adams (born August 30, 1937) is an American politician who served in the Iowa House of Representatives from 1987 to 1993, representing Iowa's 14th House of Representatives district as a member of the Democratic Party.

== Early life ==
Adams was born on August 30, 1937, in Webster County, Iowa. She is the eldest child of Wilbur and Verda Jeanblanc and has a younger brother and sister, Donald and Joyce. She attended Eagle Grove High School, Eagle Grove Community College and Buena Vista College. After completing her studies in 1957, Jeanblanc married Ron Adams. They raised seven children. Janet Adams became a teacher.

== Political career ==
Politically, she was active as board member and president of the Iowa League of Women Voters, served on the school board of the Archdiocese of Dubuque, and sat on the Hamilton County Democratic Central Committee. She represented the Democratic Party and District 14 of the Iowa House of Representatives from 1987 to 1993.
