= James Johnson (Iowa politician) =

American politician

James Johnson (born January 21, 1939) is an American politician from Iowa.

Johnson was born in Jerico, Iowa, on January 21, 1939 to parents Alvie and Gertrude. After graduating from Elma High School in 1958, he enrolled at North Iowa Area Community College. From 1961 to 1965, Johnson served in the United States Air Force. He completed his degree at the University of Northern Iowa in 1972. Starting in 1973, Johnson ran a grocery store. He won election to the Iowa House of Representatives for the first time in 1978, and was reelected in 1980. Johnson was a Republican and represented District 14.
