= Roger Wendt =

American politician (1933–2011)

Roger F. Wendt
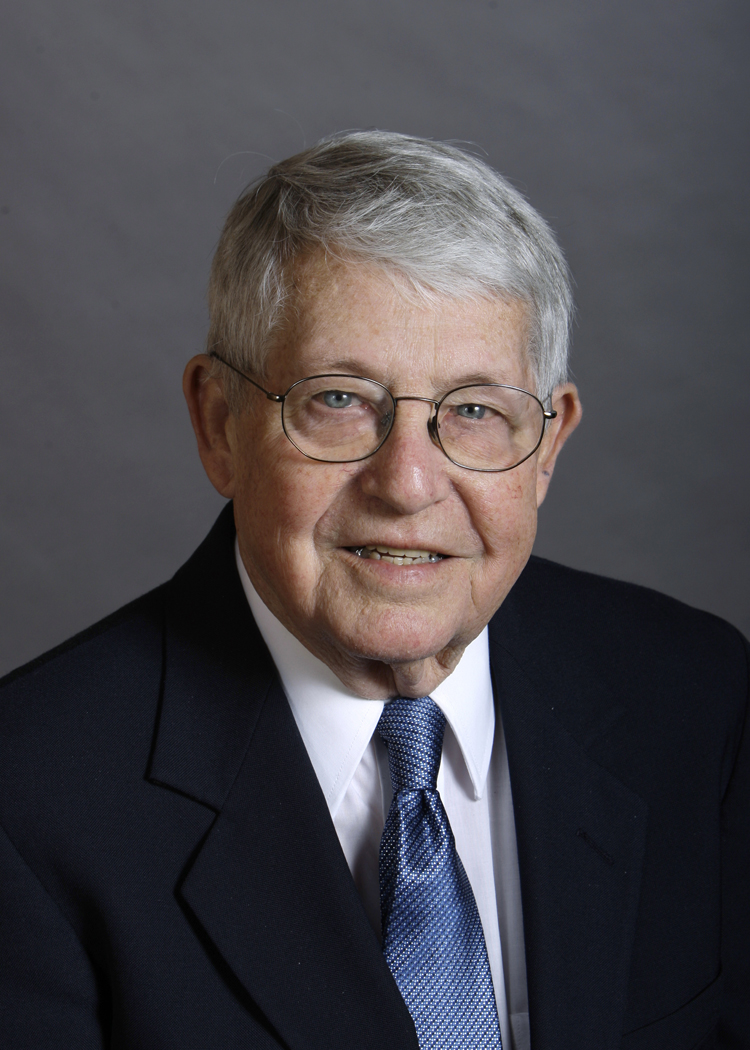

Member of the Iowa House of Representatives from the 2nd district
- In office January 13, 2003 – January 9, 2011 (stepped down February 1, 2010)
- Preceded by: Steve Warnstadt
- Succeeded by: Chris Hall

Personal details
- Born: December 31, 1933 Staplehurst, Nebraska, U.S.
- Died: March 30, 2011 (aged 77) Sioux City, Iowa, U.S.
- Party: Democratic
- Spouse: Anita
- Education: University of South Dakota, University of South Dakota
- Profession: Educator

Roger F. Wendt (December 31, 1933 – March 30, 2011) was a Democratic member of the Iowa House of Representatives, representing the 2nd District from 2003 until 2011, though he stepped down from the Iowa House in February 2010 due to serious illness. He died on March 30, 2011, from lung cancer.

Wendt received his BA from Wayne State College, his MA from the University of South Dakota, and his Ed.D. from the University of South Dakota.

Wendt was elected in 2002 and re-elected in 2006 with 4,212 votes, running unopposed. In 2008, he won reelection by a margin of only 280 votes over Republican opponent Rick Bertrand.

When he stepped down, Wendt served on several committees in the Iowa House - the Human Resources, State Government, Transportation, and Ways and Means committees, as well as the Education committee, of which he was chair. After he stepped down, he was moved to being vice chair of the Education committee for the remainder of the term.

He stepped down on February 1, 2010, due to lung cancer. He had survived cancer in his other lung 17 years earlier and been cancer-free since. Wendt died on March 30, 2011, from lung cancer.

== Electoral history ==
*incumbent

| Election | Political result | Candidate | Party | Votes | % |
|---|---|---|---|---|---|
| Iowa House of Representatives elections, 2002; District 2 Turnout: 5,817 | Democratic (newly redistricted) | Roger F. Wendt | Democratic | 3,553 | 61.1 |
| Iowa House of Representatives elections, 2002; District 2 Turnout: 5,817 | Democratic (newly redistricted) | Jim Lewis | Republican | 2,258 | 38.8 |
| Iowa House of Representatives elections, 2004; District 2 | Democratic hold | Roger F. Wendt* | Democratic | unopposed | |
| Iowa House of Representatives elections, 2006; District 2 | Democratic hold | Roger F. Wendt* | Democratic | unopposed | |
| Iowa House of Representatives elections, 2008; District 2 Turnout: 9,147 | Democratic hold | Roger F. Wendt* | Democratic | 4,709 | 51.5 |
| Iowa House of Representatives elections, 2008; District 2 Turnout: 9,147 | Democratic hold | Rick Bertrand | Republican | 4,429 | 48.4 |

Iowa House of Representatives
| Preceded by Steve Warnstadt | 2nd District; 2003–2011 | Succeeded by Chris Hall |
