= Tim Kacena =

American politician

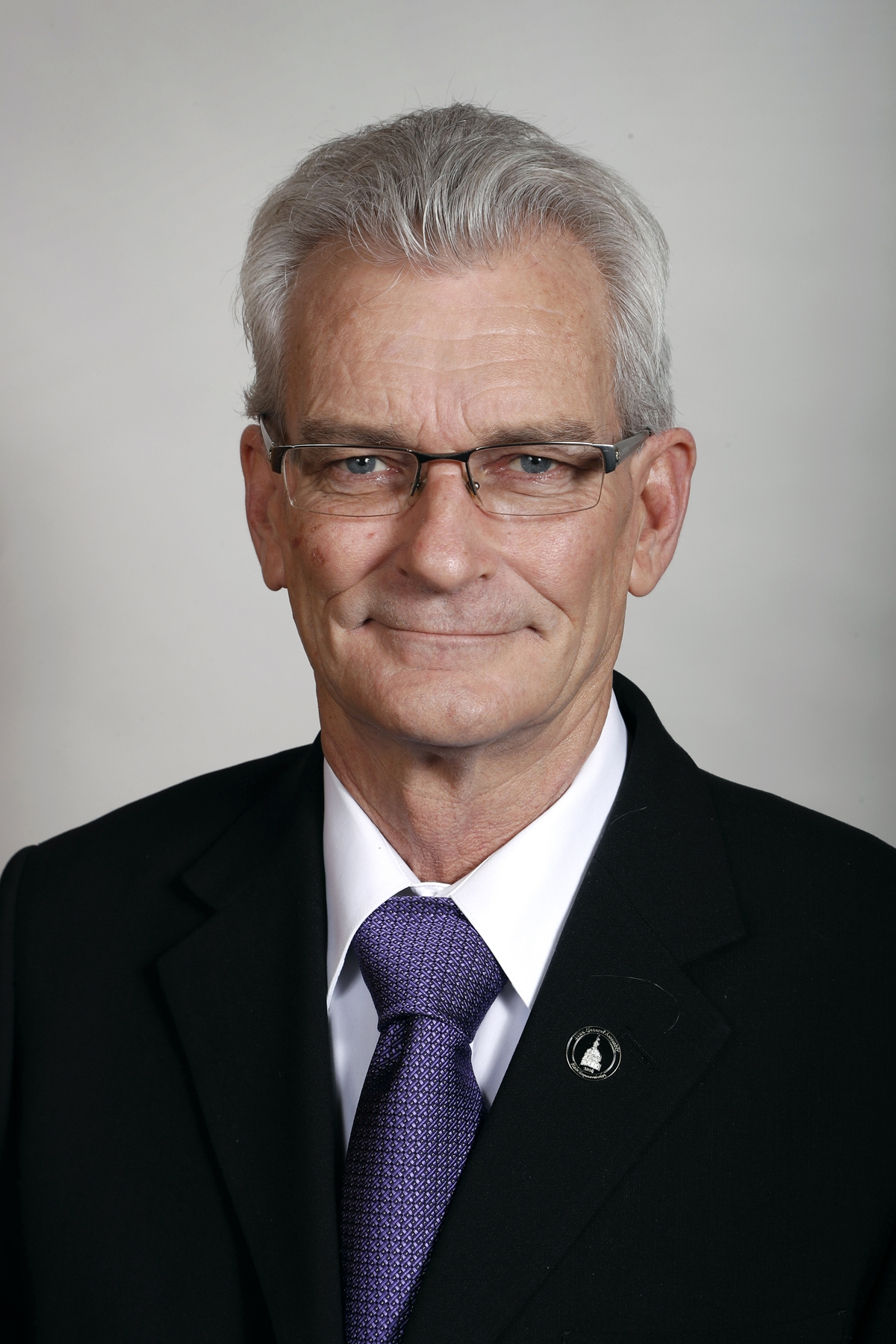
Kacena Official 2017 Portrait.

Timothy T. Kacena (born 1958) is an American politician.

Kacena is a Sioux City native, born in 1958. He graduated from Bishop Heelan Catholic High School. He was a firefighter for Sioux City Fire Rescue for three decades. In the 2016 and 2018 election cycles, Kacena defeated Republican candidate Robert Henderson, and served as a Democratic legislator representing District 14 of the Iowa House of Representatives from 2017 to 2021. Kacena did not run for a third consecutive term as a state representative. He would be succeeded by Steve Hansen.

Following the January 2020 disqualification of Jeremy Taylor as Woodbury County supervisor, Kacena declared that he would contest the special election for Taylor's vacant seat. Kacena lost the election to Justin Wright, who served a single term in office.
