= Steve Warnstadt =

American politician from Iowa

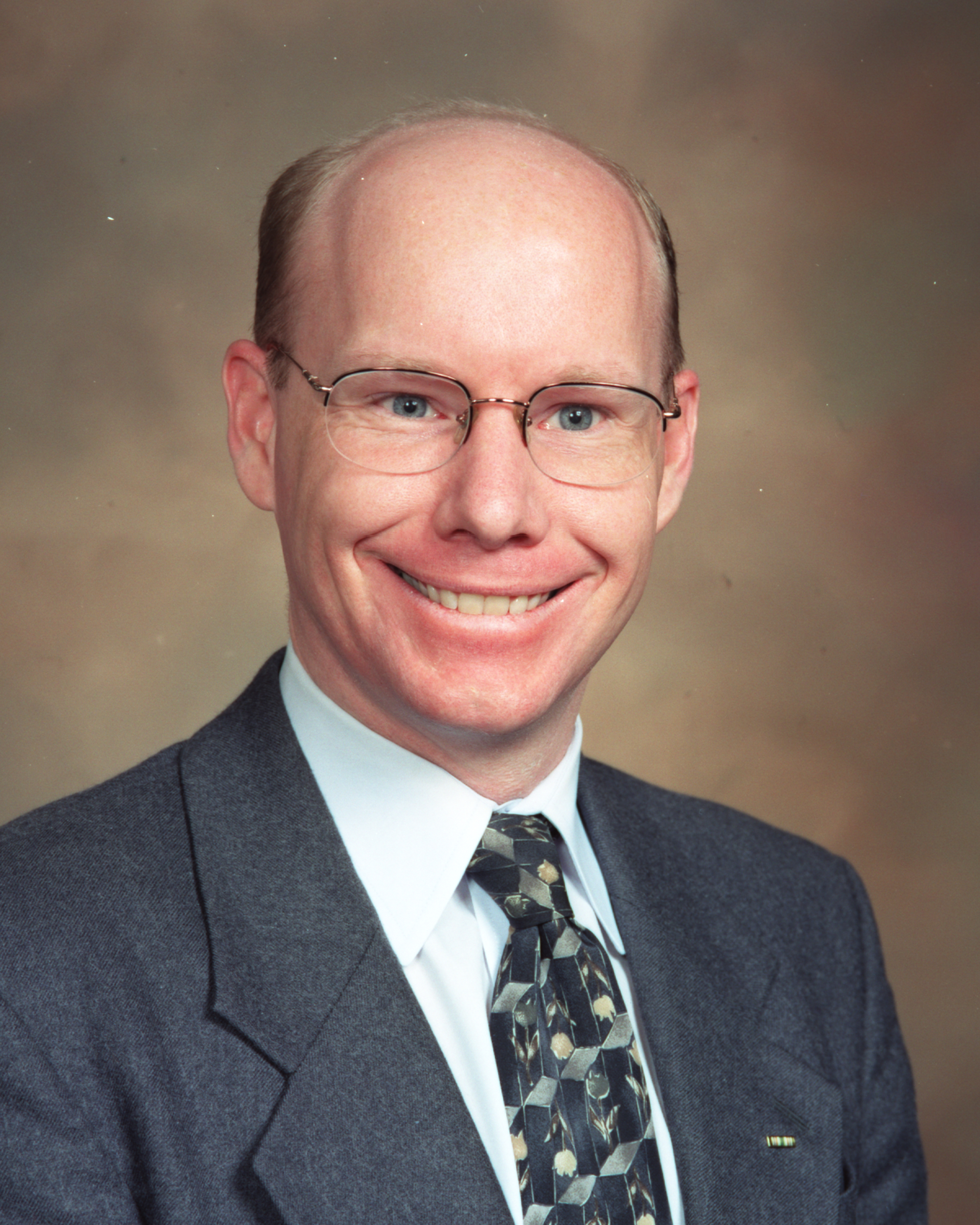

Member of the Iowa Senate from the 1st district
- In office January 13, 2003 – January 9, 2011
- Preceded by: Steven D. Hansen
- Succeeded by: Rick Bertrand

Member of the Iowa House of Representatives from the 2nd district
- In office January 9, 1995 – January 13, 2003
- Preceded by: Patrick Gill
- Succeeded by: Roger Wendt

Personal details
- Born: Steven Henning Warnstadt; August 2, 1967 (age 58) Sioux City, Iowa, U.S.
- Party: Democratic
- Spouse: Mary
- Children: Stephanie and Jackson
- Occupation: Intelligence Officer, Instructor
- Website: Warnstadt's website

Steven Henning "Steve" Warnstadt (born August 2, 1967) was the Iowa State Senator from the 1st District. A Democrat, he served in the Iowa Senate from 2003 until 2011. He received his BA from Drake University and his MA from Temple University. He is serving as an adjunct instructor with Western Iowa Tech Community College and as an intelligence officer with the Iowa Army National Guard.

Warnstadt served on several committees in the Iowa Senate: the Appropriations committee, the Judiciary committee, the Transportation committee, the Veterans Affairs committee, (where he was vice chair), and the Commerce committee (where he is chair). He also served as vice chair of the Transportation, Infrastructure, and Capitals Appropriations Subcommittee. His prior political experience includes serving as a representative in the Iowa House from 1995 to 2003, as well as being a member of the Woodbury County Democratic Central Committee in 1996, and serving as president of the Drake College Democrats from 1987 to 1988.

Warnstadt did not seek re-election in 2010.

== Electoral history ==
*incumbent

Election	Political result	Candidate	Party	Votes	%
Iowa House of Representatives elections, 1994; District 2 Turnout: 7,009	Democratic hold	Steven H. Warnstadt	Democratic	3,856	55.0
Iowa House of Representatives elections, 1994; District 2 Turnout: 7,009	Democratic hold	Darold R. Sea	Republican	3,145	44.9
Iowa House of Representatives elections, 1996; District 2 Turnout: 8,517	Democratic hold	Steven H. Warnstadt*	Democratic	5,667	66.5
Iowa House of Representatives elections, 1996; District 2 Turnout: 8,517	Democratic hold	Douglas A. Lehman	Republican	2,835	33.3
Iowa House of Representatives elections, 1998; District 2	Democratic hold	Steve Warnstadt*	Democratic	unopposed	
Iowa House of Representatives elections, 2000; District 2 Turnout: 8,469	Democratic hold	Steve Warnstadt*	Democratic	5,787	68.3
Iowa House of Representatives elections, 2000; District 2 Turnout: 8,469	Democratic hold	Joel Arends	Republican	2,670	31.5
Iowa Senate elections, 2002; District 1 Turnout: 13,906	Democratic (newly redistricted)	Steve Warnstadt	Democratic	8,871	63.8
Iowa Senate elections, 2002; District 1 Turnout: 13,906	Democratic (newly redistricted)	Jack Voss	Republican	5,020	36.1
Iowa Senate elections, 2006; District 1 Turnout: 13,956	Democratic hold	Steve Warnstadt*	Democratic	9,340	66.9
Iowa Senate elections, 2006; District 1 Turnout: 13,956	Democratic hold	Barbara Blanchard	Republican	4,607	33.0

Iowa House of Representatives
Preceded by Patrick Gill	2nd District; 1995 – 2003	Succeeded by Roger Wendt
Iowa Senate
Preceded by Steven D. Hansen	1st District; 2003 – 2011	Succeeded by Rick Bertrand
