= William Griffee =

American politician

William B. Griffee (born 13 December 1936) is an American politician.

Griffee was born in Storm Lake, Iowa, on 13 December 1936 and grew up in Panora. He earned degrees from Drake University in 1958 and 1962, then worked for John Culver from 1962 to 1972, when he was first elected to the Iowa House of Representatives. He served District 14 as a Democrat for three consecutive terms, until 1979.

Outside of politics, Griffee was a Methodist pastor, worked for the Iowa Comprehensive Alcoholic Program, and was active in organizations supportive of the United Nations.
