= Jacob Bossman =

American politician

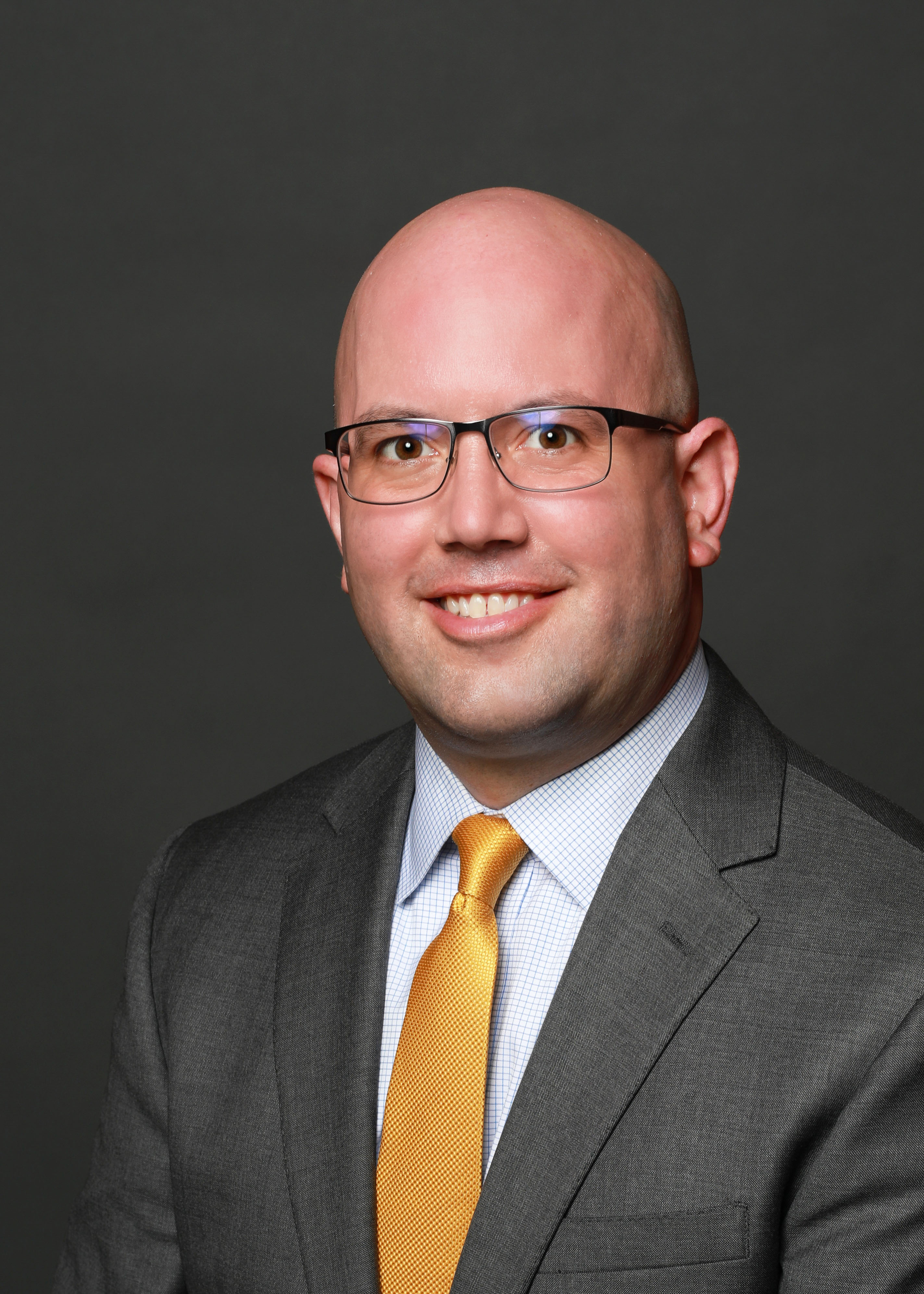
- Bossman in 2021

Member of the Iowa House of Representatives from the 14th district
- Incumbent
- Assumed office 2018
- Preceded by: Jim Carlin

Personal details
- Born: April 23, 1980 (age 46)
- Party: Republican

Jacob Bossman is an American politician who represents the 14th district in the Iowa House of Representatives.

Bossman served as a regional director for U.S. Senator Chuck Grassley. He lost to Jim Carlin in the 2016 primary election for the sixth district of the Iowa House. He won a special election to the Iowa House to succeed Carlin on January 16, 2018 after Carlin was elected to the Iowa Senate in a special election the previous year. Bossman won reelection unopposed in 2022 and 2024.

Bossman is from Sioux City, Iowa.

In the 2024 Republican Party presidential primaries, Bossman endorsed Nikki Haley.

Iowa House of Representatives
Preceded by Steve Hansen	14th District; 2023 – Present	Succeeded by Incumbent
Preceded by Jim Carlin	6th District; 2018 – 2023	Succeeded by Megan Jones
