= Rick Bertrand =

American politician

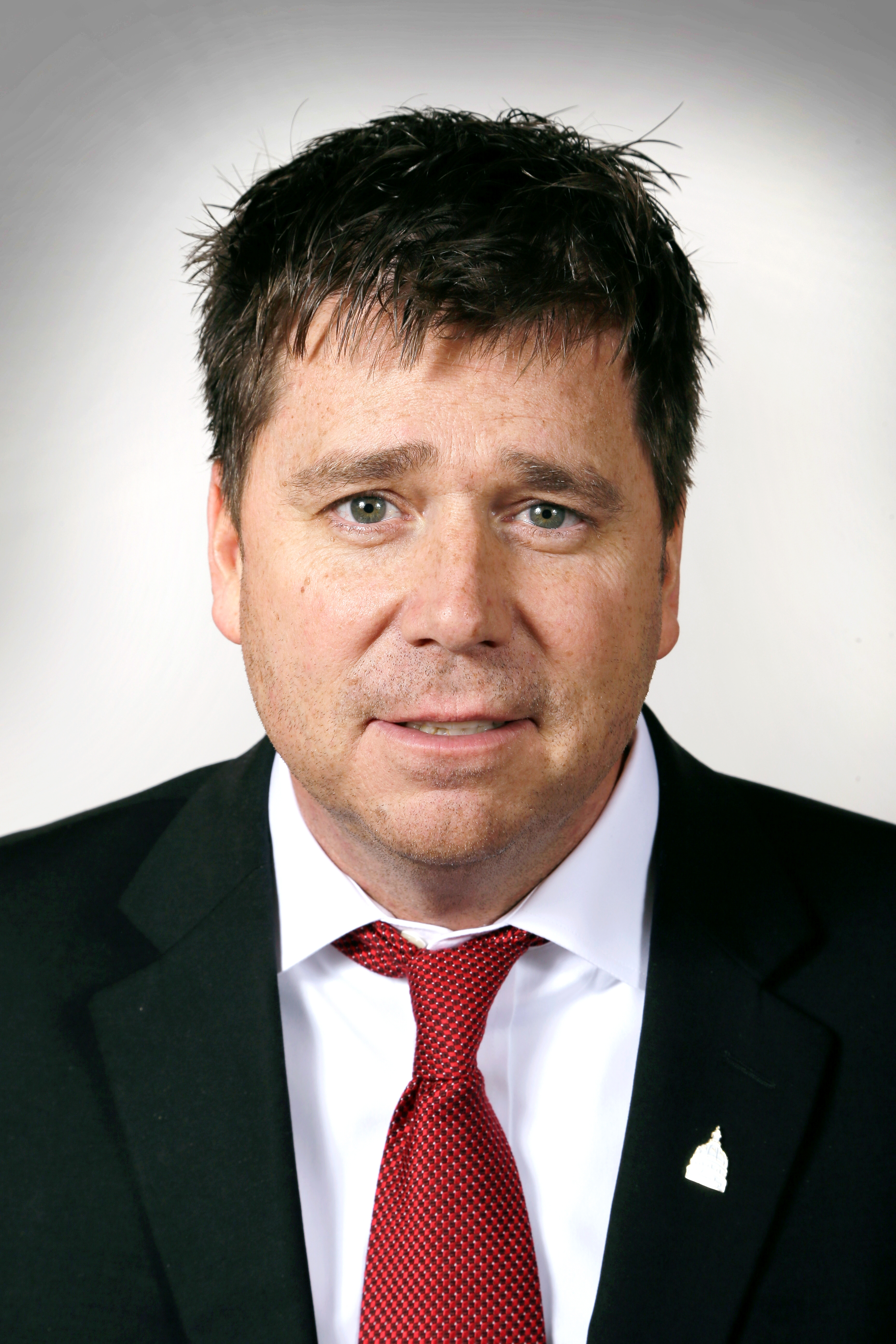

Member of the Iowa Senate from the 7th district 1st (2011–2012)
- In office 2011–2019
- Preceded by: Steve Warnstadt
- Succeeded by: Jackie Smith

Personal details
- Born: December 22, 1969 (age 56) Sioux City, Iowa, U.S.
- Party: Republican
- Spouse: Tammy Bailey
- Children: Addison William Henry
- Occupation: Commercial Developer

Rick Bertrand (born December 22, 1969) was the Iowa State Senator from the 7th District. A Republican, he has served in the Iowa Senate between 2010 and 2019.

After graduating from Bishop Heelan High School, he attended Iowa Central Community College before obtaining a degree at the University of Northern Iowa in Political Science. He earned his master's degree in Organizational Leadership from Bellevue University in 2018. Before being elected to the state senate, he unsuccessfully ran for the 2nd district seat of the Iowa House of Representatives in 2008.

In 2016, he ran in the primary for the Republican nomination for Iowa's 4th congressional district but lost the nomination to incumbent Steve King.

His current occupation is the owner of Bertrand Construction LLC located in Sioux City Iowa.
