= Iowa's 14th House of Representatives district =

American legislative district

House District 14
- Type: District of the Lower house
- Location: Iowa
- Representative: Jacob Bossman
- Parent organization: Iowa General Assembly

The 14th District of the Iowa House of Representatives in the state of Iowa is part of Woodbury County.

== Current elected officials ==
Jacob Bossman is the representative currently representing the district.

== Past representatives ==
The district has previously been represented by:

- Dale L. Tieden, 1971–1973
- William B. Griffee, 1973–1979
- James Johnson, 1979–1983
- Dale M. Cochran, 1983–1987
- Janet Adams, 1987–1993
- J. Norman Mundie, 1993–2001
- George Eichhorn, 2001–2003
- Mark Kuhn, 2003–2011
- Joshua Byrnes, 2011–2013
- David Dawson, 2013–2017
- Timothy Kacena, 2017–2021
- Steve Hansen, 2021–2023
