= Linda Nelson (American politician) =

American politician

Member of Iowa House of Representatives for District 75
- In office 1993–1995

Personal details
- Born: July 27, 1951 (age 75)
- Party: Democratic
- Education: University of Nebraska–Lincoln

Linda M. Nelson (born July 27, 1951) is an American politician who was a member of the Iowa House of Representatives.

She taught as a schoolteacher in Council Bluffs for 37 years. In 2015 she was inducted at the Iowa Hall of Fame.

She endorsed the Amy Klobuchar 2020 presidential campaign.
