= Megan Jones (politician) =

American politician (born 1988)

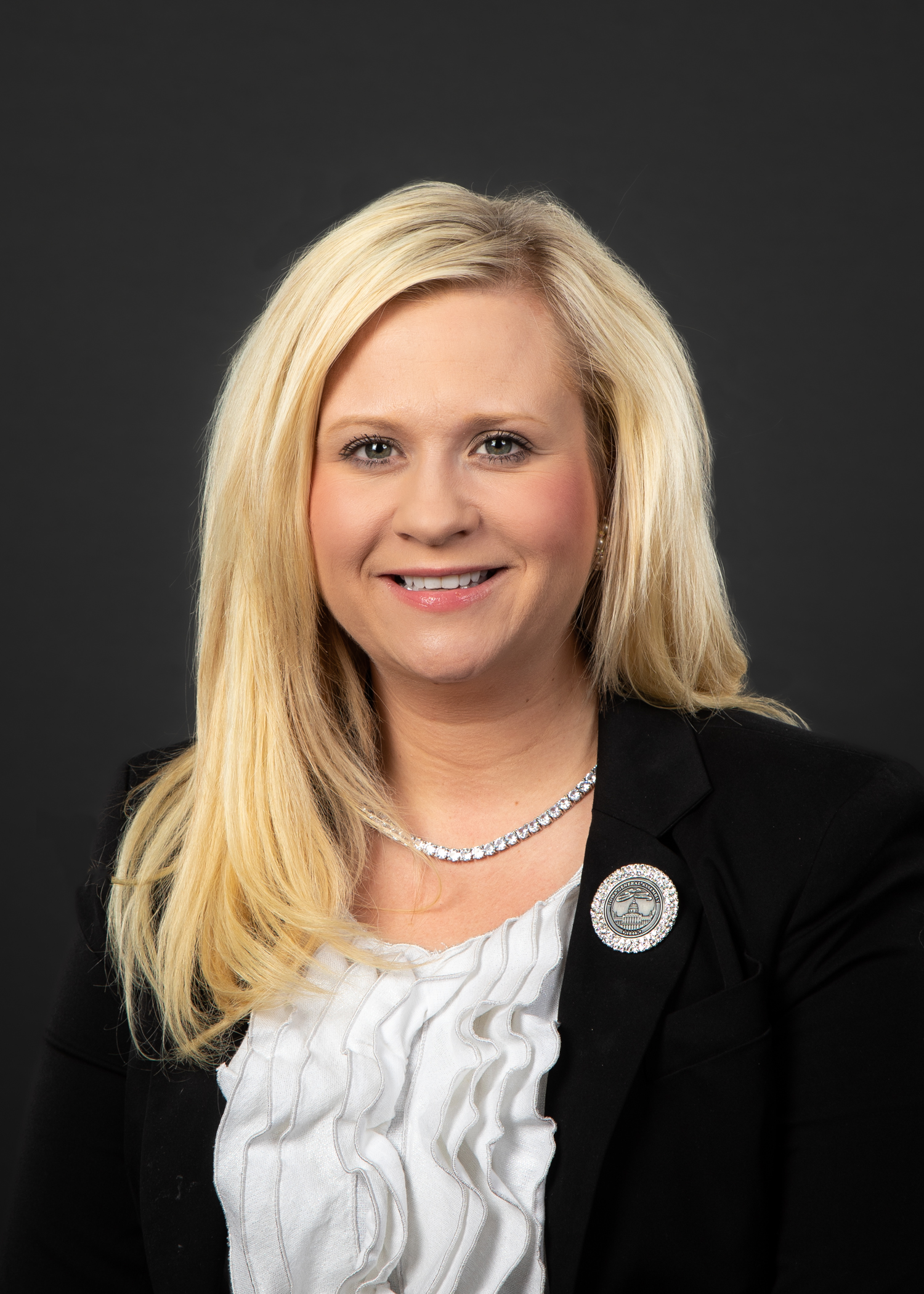

Member of the Iowa House of Representatives from the 6th district
- Incumbent
- Assumed office January 14, 2013
- Preceded by: Chris Hall

Personal details
- Born: 1988 (age 37–38) Harlan, Iowa, U.S.
- Party: Republican
- Spouse: Will Jones
- Children: 2
- Education: Drake University
- Occupation: Lawyer, politician
- Website: legis.iowa.gov/...

Megan Jones (née Hess; born 1988) is an American politician from Iowa. Jones is a Republican member of Iowa House of Representatives from District 6 and has been a Representative since 2013.

== Early life ==
In 1988, Jones was born as Megan Hess in Harlan, Iowa. In 2005, Jones graduated from Spencer High School.

== Education ==
Jones earned a bachelor's degree in Law, Politics, and Society from Drake University in Des Moines, Iowa. In 2011, Jones earned her JD degree from William Mitchell College of Law in Saint Paul, Minnesota.

== Career ==
In 2005, while Jones was in high school, she was a page for Representative Clel Baudler. While Jones was attended college, she was a clerk for Clel Baudler.

Jones is an attorney with Hemphill Law Office.

On November 6, 2012, Jones won the election and became a Republican member of Iowa House of Representatives for District 2. Jones defeated Steve Bomgaars, a teacher from her high school, with 56.5% of the votes. On November 4, 2014, as an incumbent, Jones won the election and continued serving District 2. Jones defeated Terry Manwarren and write-in candidates with 86.9% of the votes. At age 26 in 2013, Jones was one of the three youngest legislators. As a mother with a baby, she was working as a legislator who also brought her baby to work.

On November 8, 2016, as an incumbent, Jones won the election, and continued serving District 2. Jones ran an unopposed election.

On November 6, 2018, as an incumbent, Jones won the election, and continued serving District 2. Jones defeated Ryan Odor with 66.0% of the votes.

=== Committee assignments ===
As of January 2026, Jones serves on the following committees in the Iowa House.

- Transportation (chair)
- State Government
- Ways and Means
- Transportation, Infrastructure, and Capitals Appropriations Subcommittee
- All-Terrain Vehicles and Off-Road Utility Vehicles on Highways Interim Study Committee

She has endorsed Florida Senator Marco Rubio for President of the United States.

== Electoral history ==
Election	Political result	Candidate	Party	Votes	%
Iowa House of Representatives General Election, 2014; District 2 Turnout: 10,097	Republican	Megan Hess	Republican	8,770	86.9%
Iowa House of Representatives General Election, 2014; District 2 Turnout: 10,097	Republican	Terry Manwarren		1,287	12.7%
Iowa House of Representatives General Election, 2012; District 2 Turnout: 15,840	Republican (newly redistricted)	Megan Hess	Republican	8,652	54.62%
Iowa House of Representatives General Election, 2012; District 2 Turnout: 15,840	Republican (newly redistricted)	Steve Bomgaars	Democratic	6,652	41.99%

== Personal life ==
In 2014, Jones married Will Jones, a farmer. They have two children, Anchor Jones and Alma Jones (born January 2018). Jones and her family live in Sioux Rapids, Iowa.

Iowa House of Representatives
Preceded by Jacob Bossman	6th District; 2023–Present	Succeeded by Incumbent
Preceded by Chris Hall	2nd District; 2013–2023	Succeeded by Robert Henderson
