= Chris Hall (politician) =

American politician

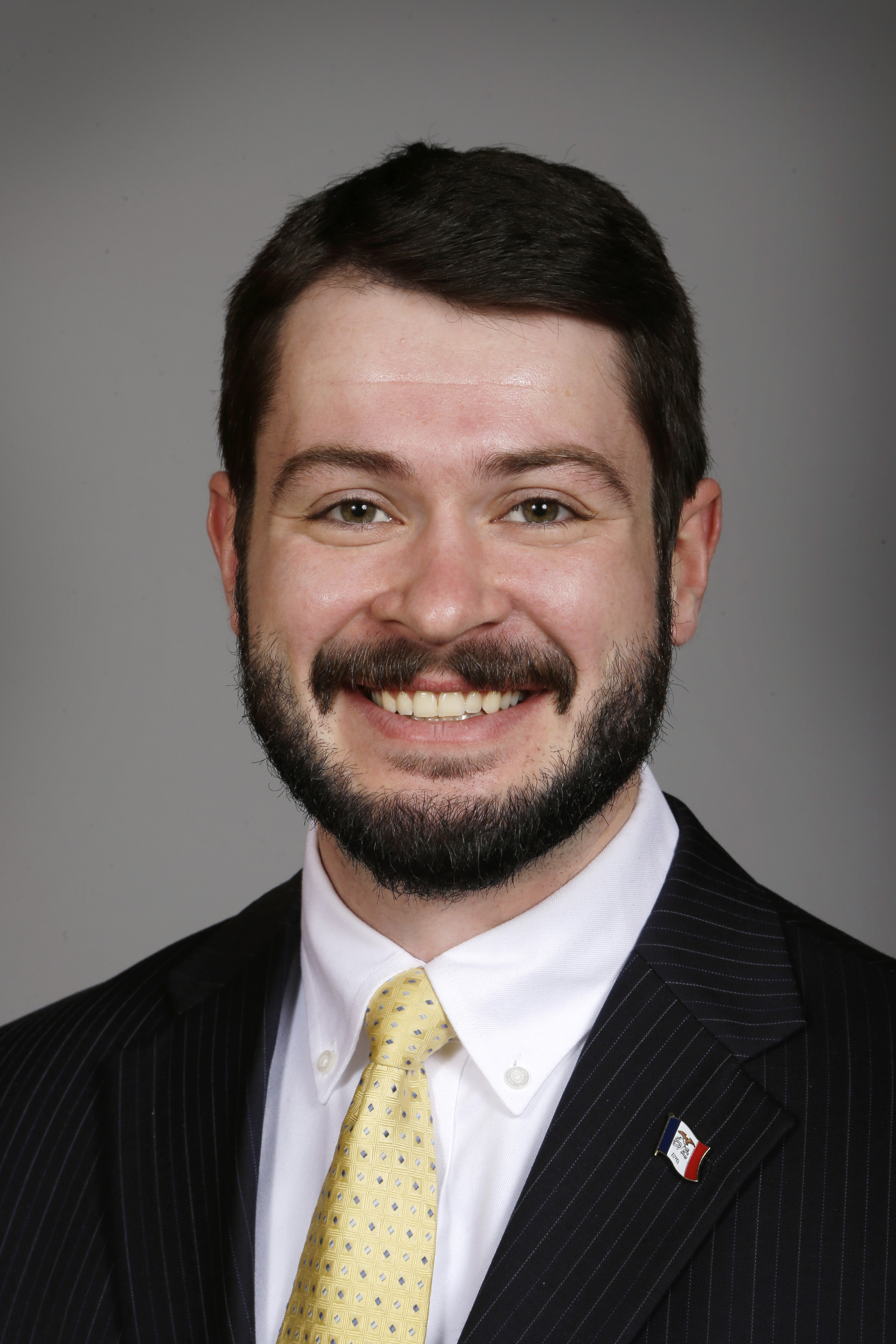

Member of the Iowa House of Representatives from the 13th district 2nd (2011–2013)
- In office January 10, 2011 – January 9, 2023
- Preceded by: Roger Wendt
- Succeeded by: Ken Carlson

Personal details
- Born: April 17, 1985 (age 41) Sioux City, Iowa, U.S.
- Party: Democratic
- Education: Grinnell College
- Occupation: Grants Coordinator, Western Iowa Tech Community College
- Website: hallforiowa.com legis.iowa.gov/...

Christopher C. Hall (born 1985) is a former Iowa State Representative from the 13th District. A Democrat, he served in the Iowa House of Representatives from 2011 to 2023. Hall was born and lives in Sioux City, Iowa. He has a B.A. in political science from Grinnell College.

Hall served on several committees in the Iowa House – the Commerce and Natural Resources committees. He also served as the ranking member of the Appropriations committee.

== Electoral history ==
*incumbent

Election	Political result	Candidate	Party	Votes	%
Iowa House of Representatives primary elections, 2010; District 2	Democratic	Chris Hall	Democratic	unopposed	
Iowa House of Representatives general elections, 2010; District 2 Turnout: 6,488	Democratic hold	Chris Hall	Democratic	3,438	54.4%
Iowa House of Representatives general elections, 2010; District 2 Turnout: 6,488	Democratic hold	Cate Bryan	Republican	2,880	45.5%
Iowa House of Representatives primary elections, 2012; District 13	Democratic	Chris Hall*	Democratic	unopposed	
Iowa House of Representatives general elections, 2012; District 13; Turnout: 12,335	Democratic (newly redistricted)	Chris Hall*	Democratic	6,410	53.3%
Iowa House of Representatives general elections, 2012; District 13; Turnout: 12,335	Democratic (newly redistricted)	Jeremy Taylor	Republican	5,615	46.69%

Iowa House of Representatives
Preceded by Roger Wendt	2nd District; 2011–2013	Succeeded by Megan Hess
Preceded by Sharon S. Steckman	13th District; 2013–2023	Succeeded by Ken Carlson
