= J. Norman Mundie =

American politician

John Norman Mundie (January 25, 1929 – December 12, 2013) was an American politician.

Mundie was a native of Rockwell City, Iowa, born on January 25, 1929. He graduated from Rockwell City High School in 1947 and was a member of the Iowa National Guard between from 1948 to 1952. Mundie married Faye Stumpf in April of that year and began farming in Rockwell City as well. He relocated to Jefferson, where he continued farming until his retirement in 1992. Mundie's political career started in 1989, with a stint as a Webster County supervisor. He was elected to the Iowa House of Representatives in 1992, and took office as a Democratic legislator from District 14. Mundie held the office for four full terms, from 1993 to 2001. He died on December 12, 2013, aged 84.
