= Patrick Gill (Iowa politician) =

American politician

Member of Iowa House of Representatives for District 2
- In office 1991–1994

Personal details
- Born: May 13, 1955 (age 71) Sioux City
- Party: Democratic

Patrick F. Gill is an American politician who was a member of the Iowa House of Representatives. After being elected in 1996, Gill has worked as a auditor and election commissioner for Woodbury County.

He endorsed the Amy Klobuchar 2020 presidential campaign.
