= Iowa's 89th House of Representatives district =

American legislative district

House District 89
- Type: District of the Lower house
- Location: Iowa
- Representative: Elinor Levin
- Parent organization: Iowa General Assembly

The 89th District of the Iowa House of Representatives in the state of Iowa. It is currently composed of part of Johnson County.

== Current elected officials ==
Elinor Levin is the representative currently representing the district.

== Past representatives ==
The district has previously been represented by:

- Herbert L. Campbell, 1971–1973
- Charles N. Poncy, 1973–1979
- Sonja Larsen, 1979–1981
- Charles N. Poncy, 1981–1983
- Jo Ann Zimmerman, 1983–1987
- Wayne McKinney, 1987–1993
- Linda Beatty, 1993–1995
- Brian Coon, 1995–1997
- Steve Richardson, 1997–2003
- Sandy Greiner, 2003–2009
- Larry Marek, 2009–2011
- Jarad Klein, 2011–2013
- Jim Lykam, 2013–2017
- Monica Kurth, 2017–2023
