= Iowa's 65th House of Representatives district =

American legislative district

House District 65
- Type: District of the Lower house
- Location: Iowa
- Representative: Shannon Lundgren
- Parent organization: Iowa General Assembly

The 65th District of the Iowa House of Representatives in the state of Iowa. It is currently composed of part of Dubuque County.

== Current elected officials ==
Shannon Lundgren is the representative currently representing the district.

== Past representatives ==
The district has previously been represented by:

- Samuel F. Anania, 1971–1973
- Philip B. Hill, 1973–1975
- Julia Gentleman, 1975–1979
- Lawrence Pope, 1979–1983
- Charles N. Poncy, 1983–1993
- Mark A. Haverland, 1993–1995
- Jeff Lamberti, 1995–1999
- Carmine Boal, 1999–2003
- Wayne Ford, 2003–2011
- Ruth Ann Gaines, 2011–2013
- Tyler Olson, 2013–2015
- Liz Bennett, 2015–2023
- Shannon Lundgren, 2023–Present
