= Kahl Building =

Historic place in Iowa, United States

- U.S. National Register of Historic Places
- U.S. Historic district – Contributing property
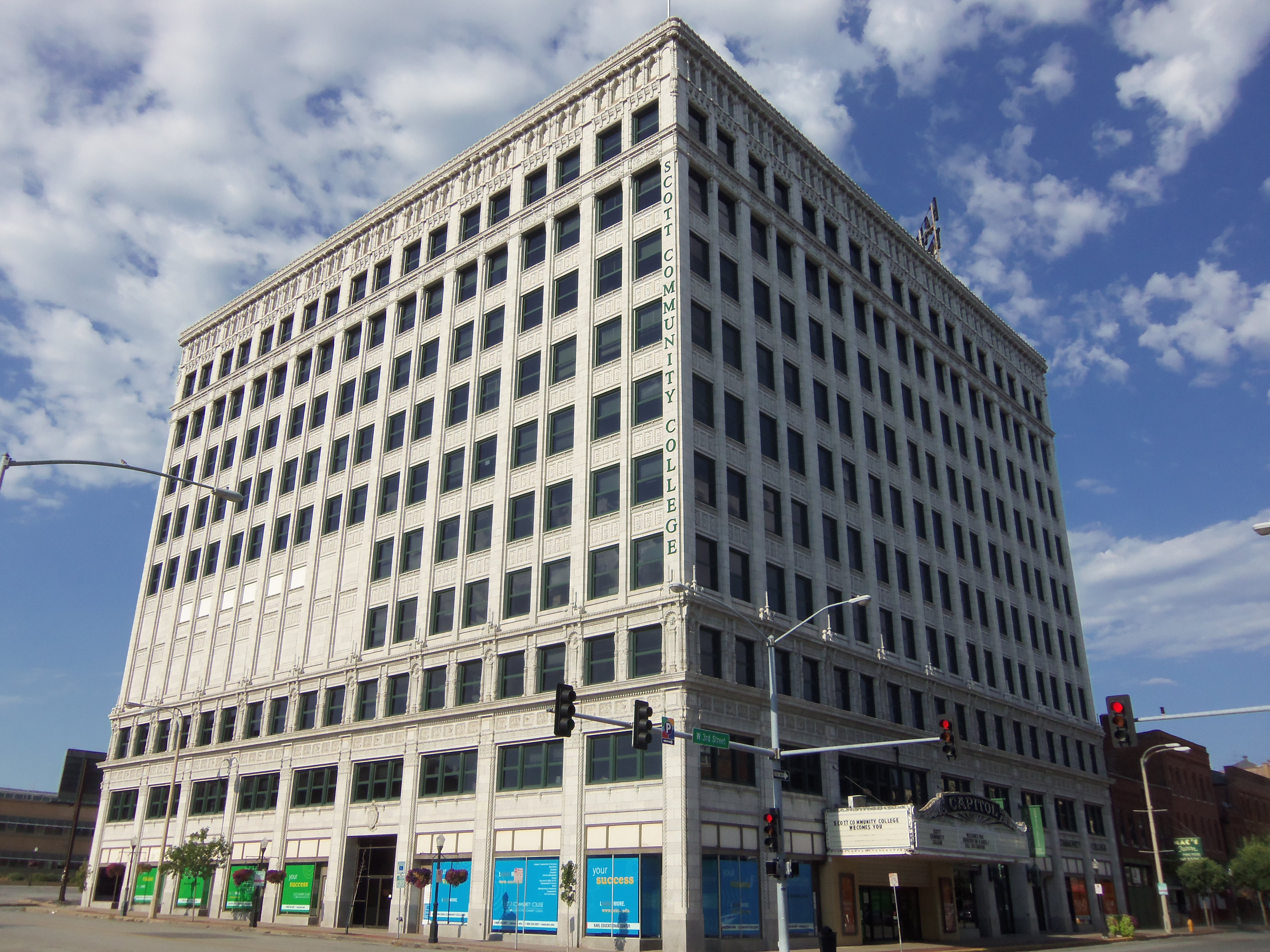

- Location within Iowa Location within the United States
- Location: 326 W. 3rd St. Davenport, Iowa
- Coordinates: 41°31′21″N 90°34′41″W
- Area: 1 acre (0.40 ha)
- Built: 1920
- Built by: Walsh-Kahl Construction Co.
- Architect: Arthur Ebeling; Rapp and Rapp
- Architectural style: Early Commercial
- Part of: Davenport Downtown Commercial Historic District (ID100005546)
- MPS: Davenport MRA
- NRHP reference No.: 83002456
- Added to NRHP: July 07, 1983

The Kahl Building is a historic building located in Downtown Davenport, Iowa, United States. It was listed on the National Register of Historic Places in 1983. In 2020 it was included as a contributing property in the Davenport Downtown Commercial Historic District. The building also includes the Capitol Theatre.

== Kahl Building ==
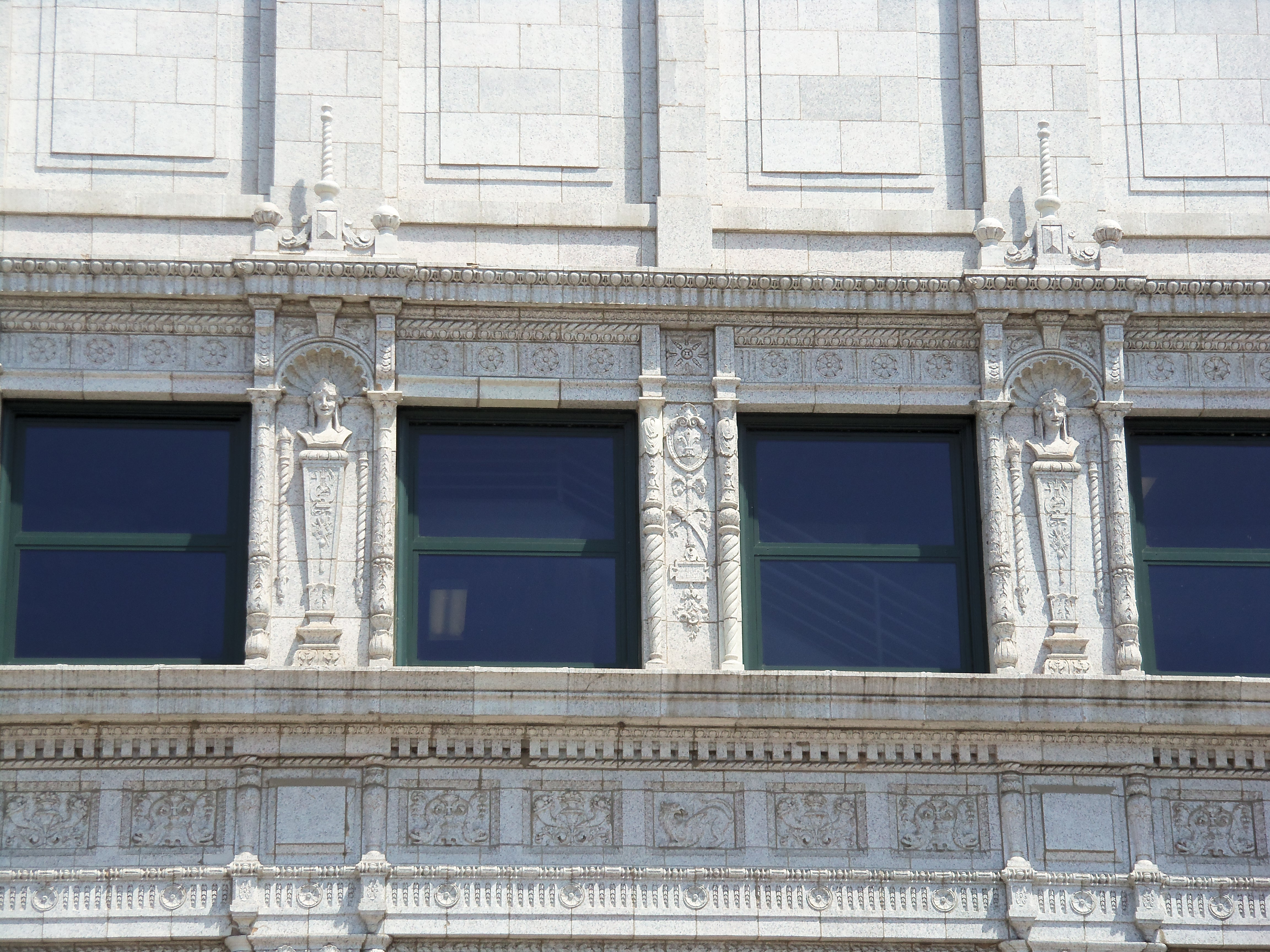
Decorative details

The Kahl Building is ten stories tall and rises 146 feet (45 m) above the ground. It was designed by Davenport architect Arthur Ebeling who used as inspiration the works of Chicago architects William Holabird, John Root and Louis Sullivan. In fact Sullivan's Wainwright Building in St. Louis is considered a model after which the Kahl Building was designed. Sullivan's influence can be seen in the more elaborate ornamentation on the lower floors while the upper floors are relatively plain. Their decoration is confined to recessed spandrel panels. The building is capped with a staccato pairing of round-arch windows and an elaborate cornice.

In 1920, the building was constructed by Henry Kahl and Walsh-Kahl Construction for $1.5 million. It was considered high-quality office space, which was in demand at the time, and was fully leased before construction was complete. The building is composed of steel frame construction with stone and decorative terra cotta facing materials. The building's sense of height is highlighted by recessing the spandrel panels between the floors and behind the vertical piers. It is considered an "exceptional example of the influence of the Chicago School on commercial architecture." Historically, the building has contained 184 office suites, several retail shops, a restaurant, and the Capital Theater. The lobby walls were faced with Alabama marble that is swirled in pinks, and it featured bronze and copper doors.

In 1994 the family of Davenport Banker V.O. Figge and his wife Elizabeth, who was Henry Kahl's daughter, donated the building to the Scott Community College Foundation, which used it for academic purposes. The Eastern Iowa Community College District announced in August 2014 their intention to leave the Kahl Building and relocate to a new campus in the former First Federal Savings and Loan Association Building and First Midwest Bank building on West Third Street between Brady and Main streets. The new college campus was opened in January 2018, and the Kahl Building was sold to Jim Bergman of JNB Capitol Building for $2 million in June. A $20 million project renovated the Kahl Building into 65 market-rate apartments. That project was completed in 2023. It preserved the building's original gold elevators, marble floors, handcrafted plasterwork, and detailed artwork.

== Capitol Theatre ==
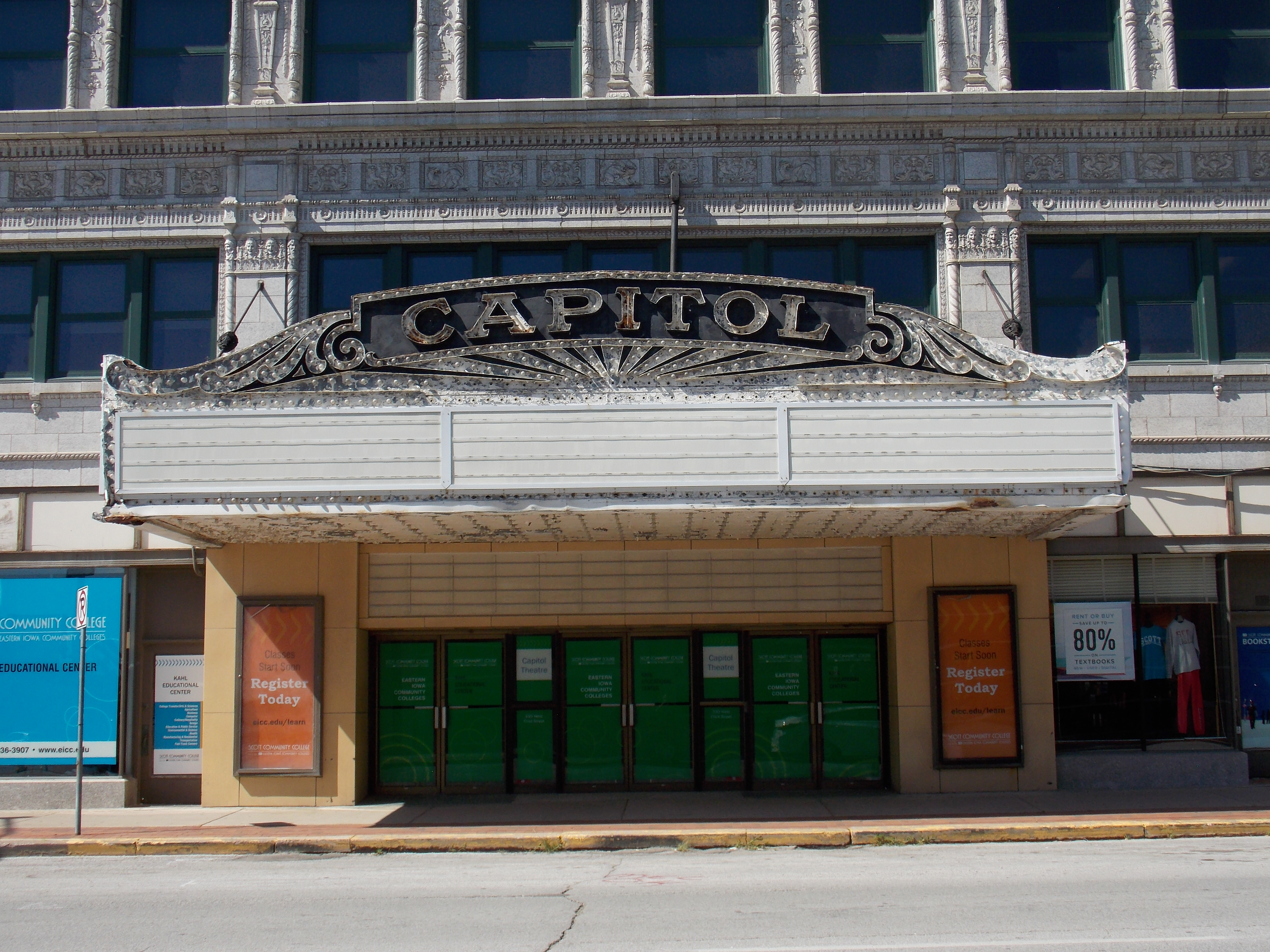
Capitol Theater marquee

The Capitol Theatre opened on December 25, 1920. Builder Henry C. Kahl wanted to provide a 2,500-seat, palace-type theater. Kahl planned a luxurious movie theater larger than any in Davenport or Iowa. When opened, the theater boasted grand pianos, gold leaf decoration, and several chandeliers. Its interior was designed by the Chicago firm of Rapp & Rapp. The original pipe organ was built by the M. P. Moller Pipe Organ Company. It was replaced by a Wicks pipe organ for $30,000 and contains 700 pipes. The organ received a $75,000 restoration in 2000, and it is now the only Wicks theater organ that remains in its original home. In 1925, a 7-story stage house and stage expansion were constructed. It was designed by the Davenport architectural firm of Clausen & Kruse. Priester Construction Company of Davenport was the general contractor. The theater joined the Radio-Keith-Orpheum (RKO) circuit in 1927. It discontinued operating as a working movie theater in 1977 and was the last of the city's movie palaces in operation at the time. By 2023 it had been 14 years since the theater had been used for any performance.

A variety of performers have performed on its stage including vaudeville shows. It hosted the Winter Dance Party in 1959 that included Buddy Holly, the Big Bopper, and Ritchie Valens before their deaths five days later in an airplane crash outside of Clear Lake, Iowa. The Capitol currently has a capacity of 2,000 seats. The Kahl Building's renovation includes the Capitol Theatre whose planned use will be for small concerts, plays, comedians, and movies. In 2023, a $24 million renovation and restoration of the theater was completed. A ribbon cutting ceremony was held on July 12, and the first concert in venue by Blackberry Smoke is scheduled on September 29, 2023.
