= Brian Coon =

American politician and engineer (born 1970)

Member of the Iowa House of Representatives from the 89th district
- In office January 9, 1995 – January 12, 1997
- Preceded by: Linda Beatty
- Succeeded by: Steve Richardson

Personal details
- Born: Brian A. Coon; September 19, 1970 (age 55) Iowa City, Iowa, U.S.
- Party: Republican
- Spouse: Julie McNamar (m. 1992)
- Education: University of Iowa (BSE)
- Occupation: Politician, engineer

Brian A. Coon (born September 19, 1970) is an American engineer and politician.

Coon was born in Iowa City, Iowa, to parents George and Diana on September 19, 1970. He graduated from Carlisle High School in 1989, and enrolled at the University of Iowa, where he was the executive officer of the undergraduate student senate.

After completing his Bachelor of Science in Engineering degree in 1993, Coon became certified as mechanical engineer in training, and owner of Carlisle Systems. He served in the Iowa House of Representatives from 1995 to 1997 as a Republican legislator for District 89.

After deciding not to run for reelection, Coon attended the University of Nebraska–Lincoln (UNL) in Lincoln, Nebraska. Working at the Midwest Roadside Safety Facility, Coon worked on multiple National Cooperative Highway Research Program projects, becoming an expert on traffic accident reconstruction.

After completing his master's degree in 1999, Coon worked at the Swedish National Road and Transport Research Institute under a scholarship provided by the Fulbright Program.

In 2001, Coon became licensed in mechanical engineering. In 2002, Coon became licensed in civil engineering.

In 2003, Coon completed his doctorate in engineering at UNL. In 2006, Coon graduated the University of Nebraska College of Law with honors and a certificate in criminal litigation.

From 2006 to 2008, Coon was the director of Kansas State University's Transportation Research Center. From 2008 to 2018, he was the Americans with Disabilities Act (ADA) Coordinator and Traffic Engineer for Wichita, Kansas.

Since 2002, Coon has served as a member and committee chair of the Machine Design Committee of the National Council of Examiners for Engineering and Surveying.

In 2006, Coon attended the part-time police academy, becoming certified as a police officer in the state of Kansas. Coon worked for several departments, including Jackson County, Kansas, Wamego, Kansas, and Maize, Kansas. While an officer for Maize, he earned the medal of valor for rescuing a drowning woman from a submerged SUV.

An recognized expert in guardrail and end terminal traffic accident reconstructions, Coon testified in the ET-Plus Guardrail trial. Coon testifies in both state and federal courts concerning traffic accident reconstructions.

Coon currently practices law in Wichita, Kansas.
