= Sonja Larsen =

Sonja Larsen may refer to:

- Sonja Larsen (politician), an American state legislator,
- Sonja Larsen, a Norwegian biathlete who was a medalist at the Norwegian Biathlon Championships in 1981,
- Sonja Larsen, a Canadian social worker and writer who won the Edna Staebler Award for non-fiction writing in 2017.
