= Charles Poncy =

American politician

Charles N. Poncy

Member of the Iowa House of Representatives from the 65th district
- In office January 10, 1983 – January 10, 1993
- Preceded by: Lawrence Pope
- Succeeded by: Mark A. Haverland

Member of the Iowa House of Representatives from the 89th district
- In office January 12, 1981 – January 9, 1983
- Preceded by: Sonja Larsen
- Succeeded by: Jo Ann Zimmerman
- In office January 8, 1973 – January 7, 1979
- Preceded by: Herbert L. Campbell
- Succeeded by: Sonja Larsen

Member of the Iowa House of Representatives from the 18th district
- In office January 9, 1967 – January 10, 1971
- Preceded by: Cleve Carnahan
- Succeeded by: Kenneth D. Scott

Personal details
- Born: March 22, 1922 Wapello County, Iowa, United States
- Died: January 29, 2015 (aged 92) Ottumwa, Iowa, United States
- Party: Democratic
- Occupation: maintenance engineer, low rent housing commissioner

Charles Nelson Poncy (March 2, 1922 – January 29, 2015) was an American politician in the state of Iowa.

Poncy was born in Wapello County, Iowa. He graduated Ottumwa High School and was a maintenance engineer and low rent housing commissioner. He served in the Iowa House of Representatives from 1967 to 1993 as a Democrat.
