= EICC =

EICC may refer to:

- Eastern Iowa Community Colleges
- Edinburgh International Conference Centre
- European Individual Chess Championship
