= Liz Bennett =

American politician

- Bennett in 2023

Member of the Iowa Senate from the 39th district
- Incumbent
- Assumed office January 9, 2023
- Preceded by: Kevin Kinney

Member of the Iowa House of Representatives from the 65th district
- In office January 11, 2015 – January 8, 2023
- Preceded by: Tyler Olson
- Succeeded by: Shannon Lundgren

Personal details
- Born: August 6, 1982 (age 44)
- Party: Democratic
- Education: Kirkwood Community College (AA); Cornell College (BA)
- Website: https://lizbennett.com/

Elizabeth Bennett (born 1982) is an American politician who has served as a member of the Iowa Senate from the 39th District since 2023. She initially served in the Iowa House of Representatives for the 65th District from 2015 to 2023. She is currently a member of the Democratic Party.

Bennett is the first openly LGBTQ woman to serve in Iowa's state legislature.

== Early and personal life ==
Bennett was born in 1982 in Rock Island County, Illinois. She moved to Cedar Rapids, Iowa, in 2002 and attended Kirkwood Community College and Cornell College, graduating from the latter with a Bachelor of Arts in politics and women's studies.

Bennett resides in Cedar Rapids, Iowa.

== Voting record ==
In the 2017 legislative session, Bennett voted against a cut of $638,000 to the Department of Veterans Affairs and Iowa Veterans Home.

Iowa Senate
Preceded by Kevin Kinney	39th District; 2023 – present	Succeeded by Incumbent
Iowa House of Representatives
Preceded by Tyler Olson	65th District; 2015 – 2023	Succeeded by Shannon Lundgren
