= Jim Lykam =

American politician

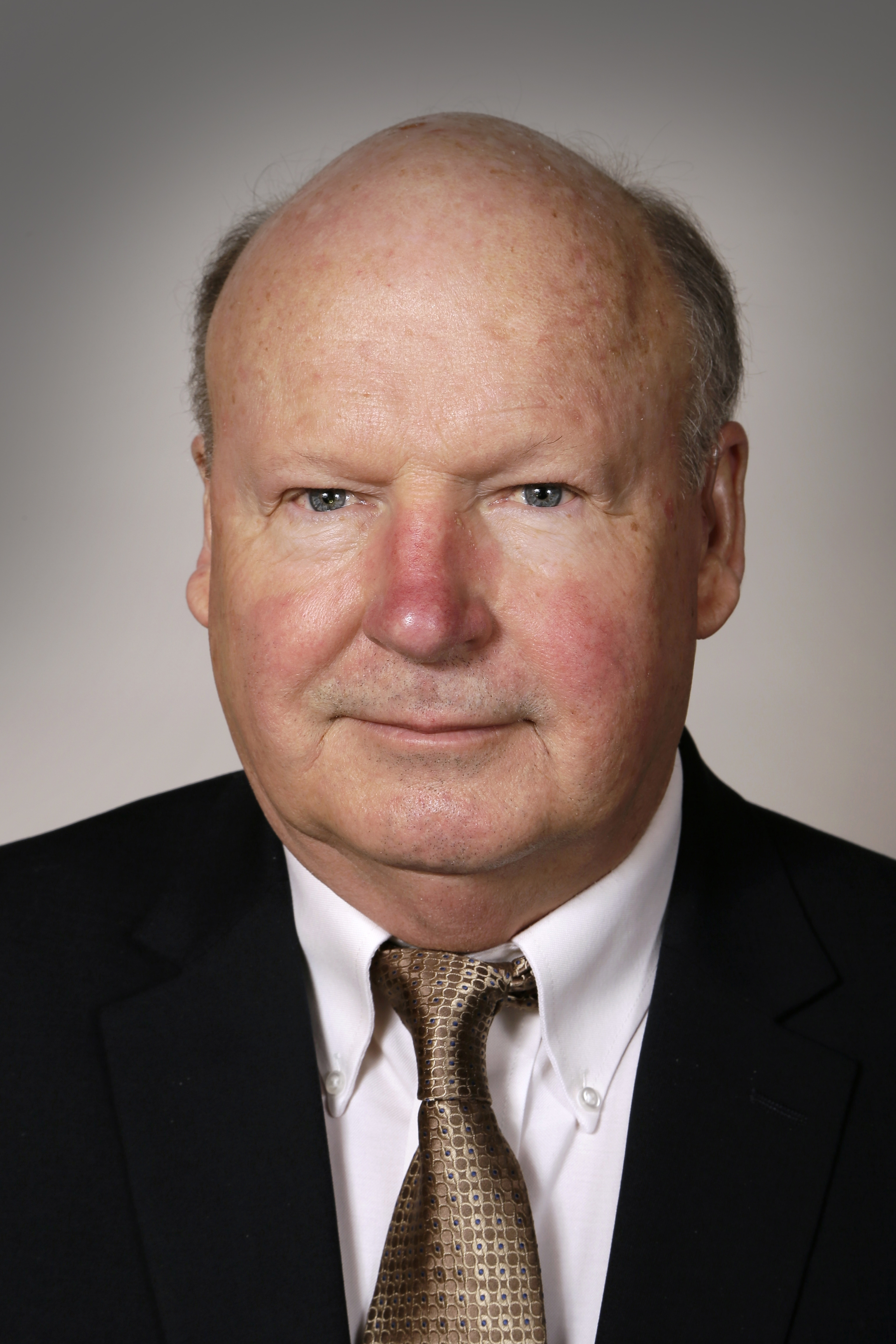

Member of the Iowa Senate from the 45th district
- In office January 2, 2017 – January 2, 2023
- Preceded by: Joe Seng
- Succeeded by: Janice Weiner

Member of the Iowa House of Representatives from the 89th district
- In office 2003 – January 2, 2017
- Preceded by: Gerald D. Jones
- Succeeded by: Monica Kurth

Personal details
- Born: December 16, 1949 (age 76) Davenport, Iowa, U.S.
- Party: Democratic
- Education: Palmer Junior College
- Website: Lykam's website

Jim Lykam (born December 16, 1949) is an American politician. He served in the Iowa Senate, representing the 45th district, from 2017 to 2022. He previously represented the 89th district in the Iowa House of Representatives from 2003 to 2017. He is a member of the Democratic Party.

== Early life and education ==
Lykam was born in 1949 in Davenport, Iowa. He attended Davenport West High School. Lykam received his AA from Palmer Junior College.

== Career ==
Lykam served on several committees in the Iowa House of Representatives: the Local Government committee; the Natural Resources committee; the Transportation committee, where he was vice chair; and the Public Safety committee, where he was chair. He also serves on the Transportation, Infrastructure, and Capitals Appropriations Subcommittee. Lykam was re-elected in 2006 with 5,623 votes (54%), defeating Republican opponent Roby Smith.

In December 2016, Lykam won a special election to the Iowa Senate. Lykam won reelection in 2018 but did not seek reelection in 2022.

== Election History ==
2016 Iowa State Senate district 45 special election
Party	Candidate	Votes	%
Democratic	Jim Lykam	3,788	73
Republican	Michael Gonzales	1,130	25

2018 Iowa State Senate district 45 election
Party	Candidate	Votes	%
Democratic	Jim Lykam	14,629	96.1
No Party	Other/Write-in	599	3.9

Iowa House of Representatives
Preceded by Hubert Houser	85th District; 2003 – 2016	Succeeded by Monica Kurth
