= Al-Quds College =

College in Amman, Jordan

- Type: Private community College
- Established: 1980
- Students: 3000
- Location: Amman, Jordan
- CEO: Ibrahim Al-Safadi
- Website: http://www.quds.edu.jo/

Al-Quds College in Jordan was established in 1983 and is part of Luminus Education Group. Al Quds College is a private community college offering vocational two year diploma programs in six areas.

== History ==
Al-Quds College in Jordan was established in 1983 and is part of Luminus Education Group. It is a private community college. To date, over 25,000 students have graduated from Al Quds College.

== Academics ==
Al Quds College offers vocational two year diploma programs in six areas. All of its programs are accredited by the Ministry of Higher Education and Scientific Research through Al Balqa University. Luminus Education is in talks with global education partners to strengthen Al Quds College's programs and provide faculty and certification programs that are developed in cooperation with the industry in Jordan, raising the level of training to Best International Standards.

Al Quds also provides locally accredited career development programs (4–9 months) to individuals who have not graduated from high school or who are looking for a career change. All of its trainers/facilitators come from the industry and offer both theoretical and practical expertise. After course completion trainees have the option to sit for international examinations at the Pro-metric Testing Center to receive their passing certificates.

Established in 1999, Arcana provides internationally certified Management and IT training programs to corporations and government organizations. Arcana is also an authorized Pro-metric Testing Center.

=== Diploma programs ===
- Medical Assistance
- Engineering Studies
- Financial Studies
- Administrative Studies
- Information Technology
- Applied Arts
- Hotel Management
- Tourism
- Sales and Management
- Retail Management
- Human Resources Management
- Office Systems Management

Programs are certified by the Ministry of Higher Education through Al-Balqa university.

=== Students ===
The current student population of the college is approximately 2,500 students.

== International projects ==
Al Quds College is working on several projects. Some are funded and supported by the United States Agency for International Development through Higher Education for Development including two different projects with two different states, Iowa and Michigan.

=== Economic Empowerment through Entrepreneurship ===
Al Quds College works with Eastern Iowa Community Colleges in Iowa to develop entrepreneurship training for career and technical training for students in order to exchange knowledge and extend students' experiences through exchange visits that includes students and Faculty. Partners are developing and implementing an entrepreneurship across the curriculum program for career and technical education students and a modularized entrepreneurship certificate program for existing small and medium-sized businesses.

=== Community Colleges Entrepreneurship Integration To Incubation ===
Community College Entrepreneurship Integration to Incubation: Al Quds College with Washtenaw Community College and William Davidson Institute at the University of Michigan established a business Incubator at Al Quds premises in order to help the local community and Al Quds College students to start-up their own business right from the college and prior to graduation. The incubator tenants are selected after going through a simple process that includes taking the Build Your Business (BYB) course, participating in the quick pitch competition and presenting a business model canvas, the best tenants will be selected and incubated. Al Quds Business Incubator offers different services including: mentoring, training, roundtable discussions and connections with organisations from both the private and public sector.

== Photo gallery ==
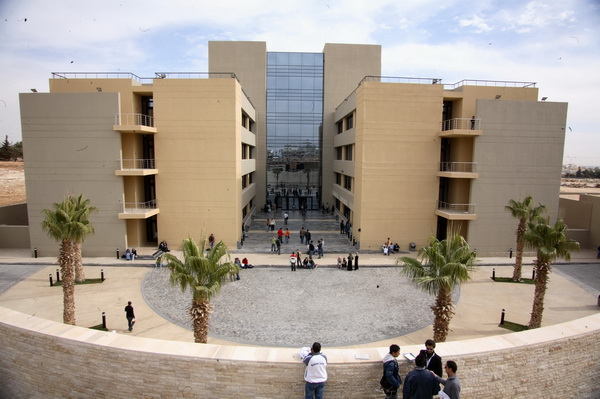
Building view of the college

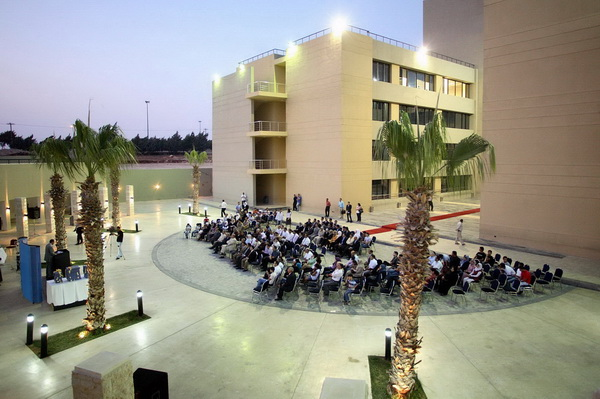
View of the building with students

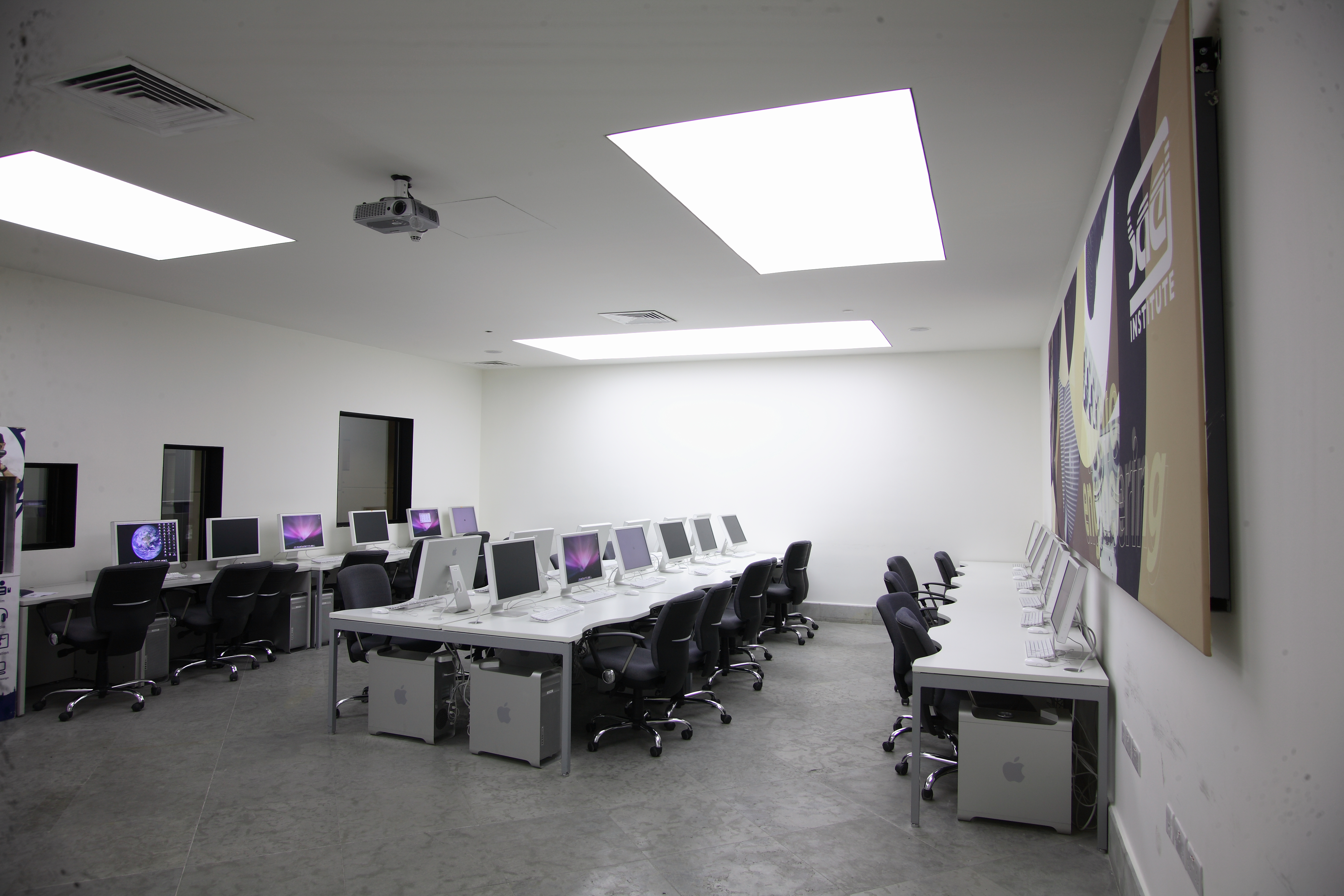
Computer Labs of the College

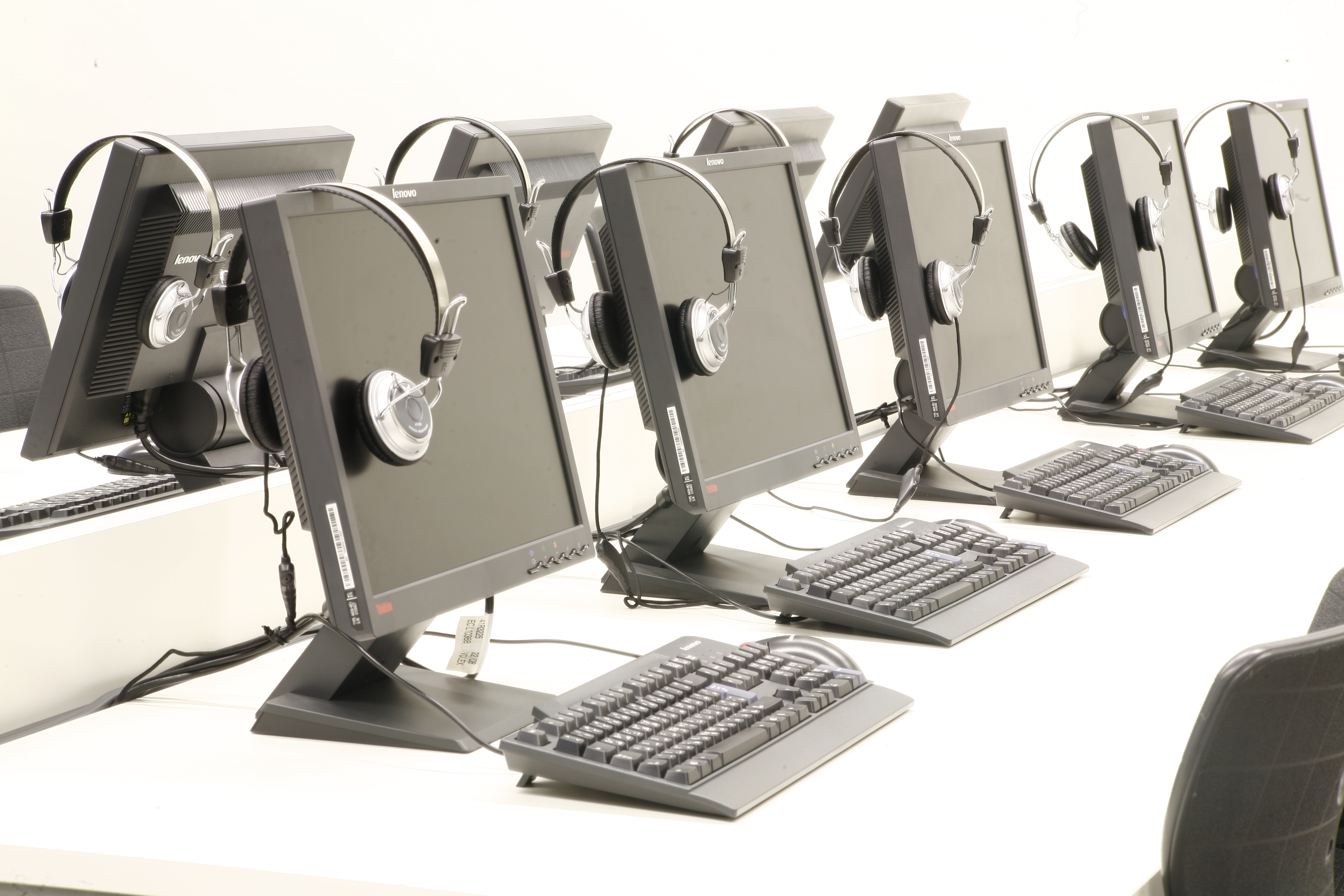
Desktops of Library

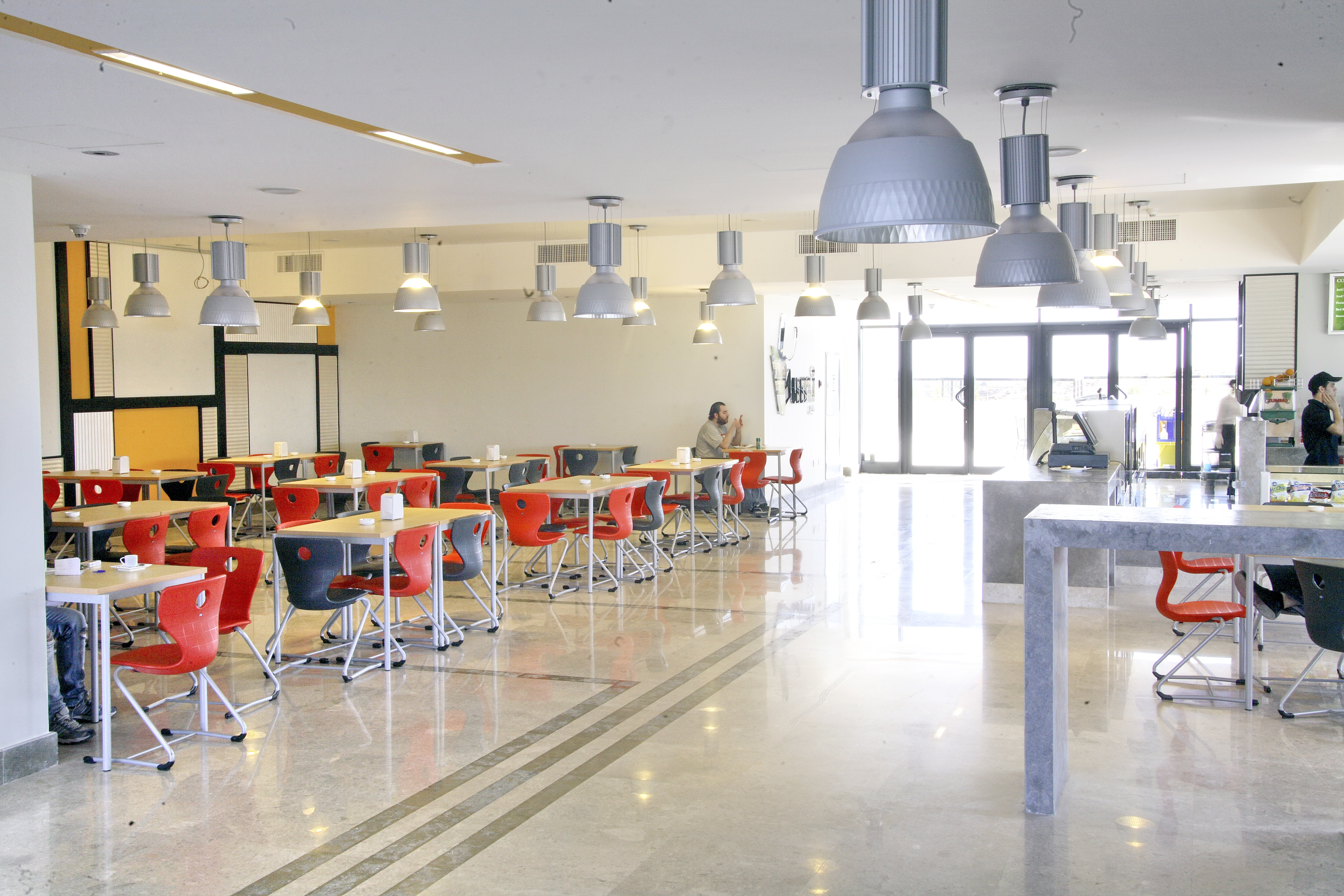
Cafeteria for students and staff

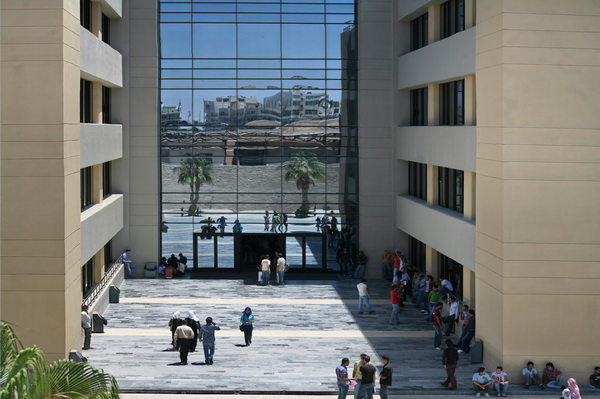
Snap of the college view

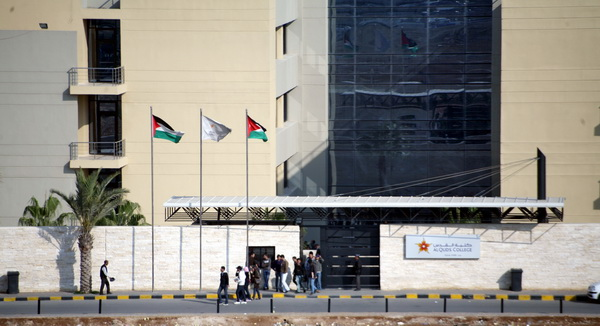
front view of the building

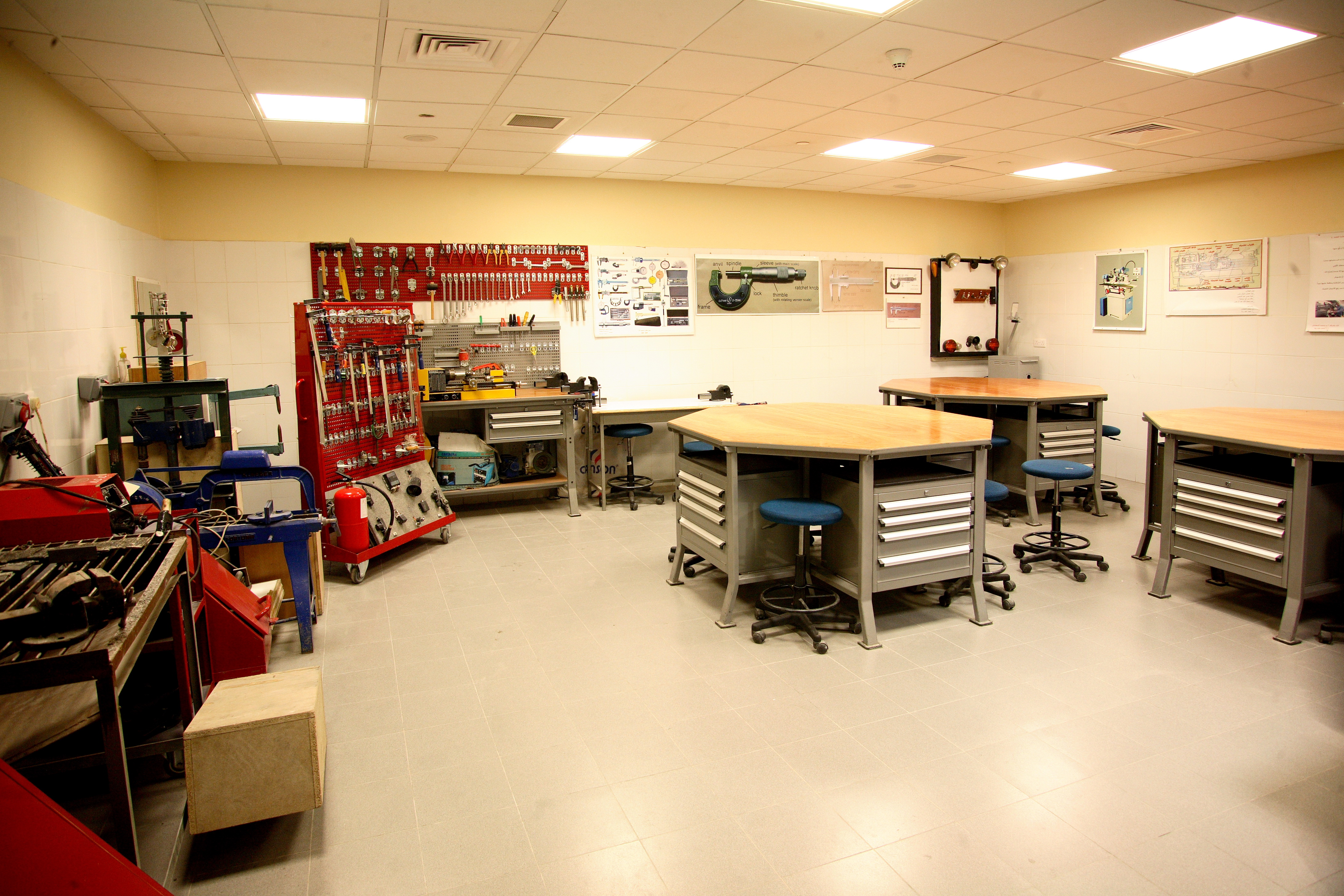
Practical Training for the Students

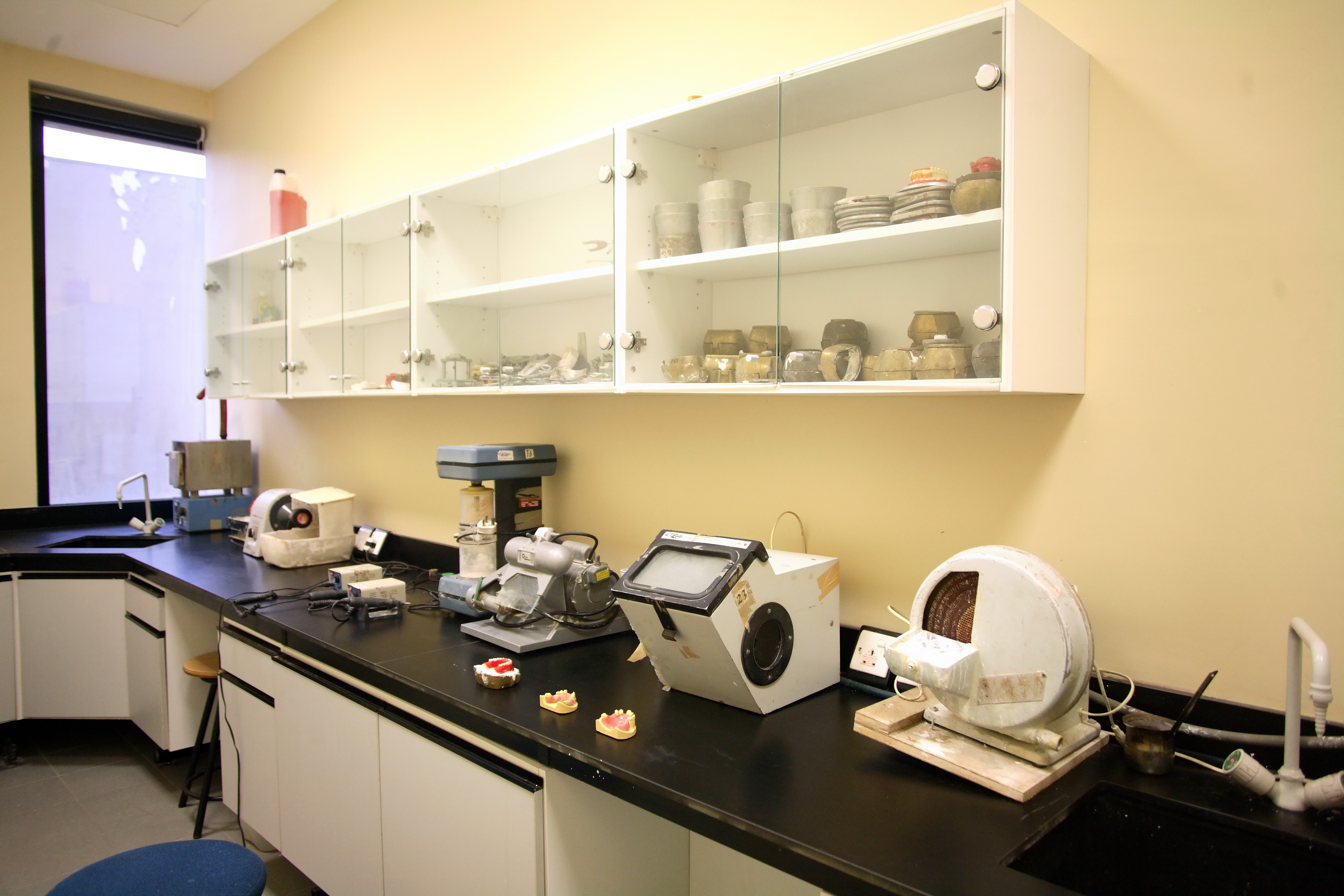
Student labs

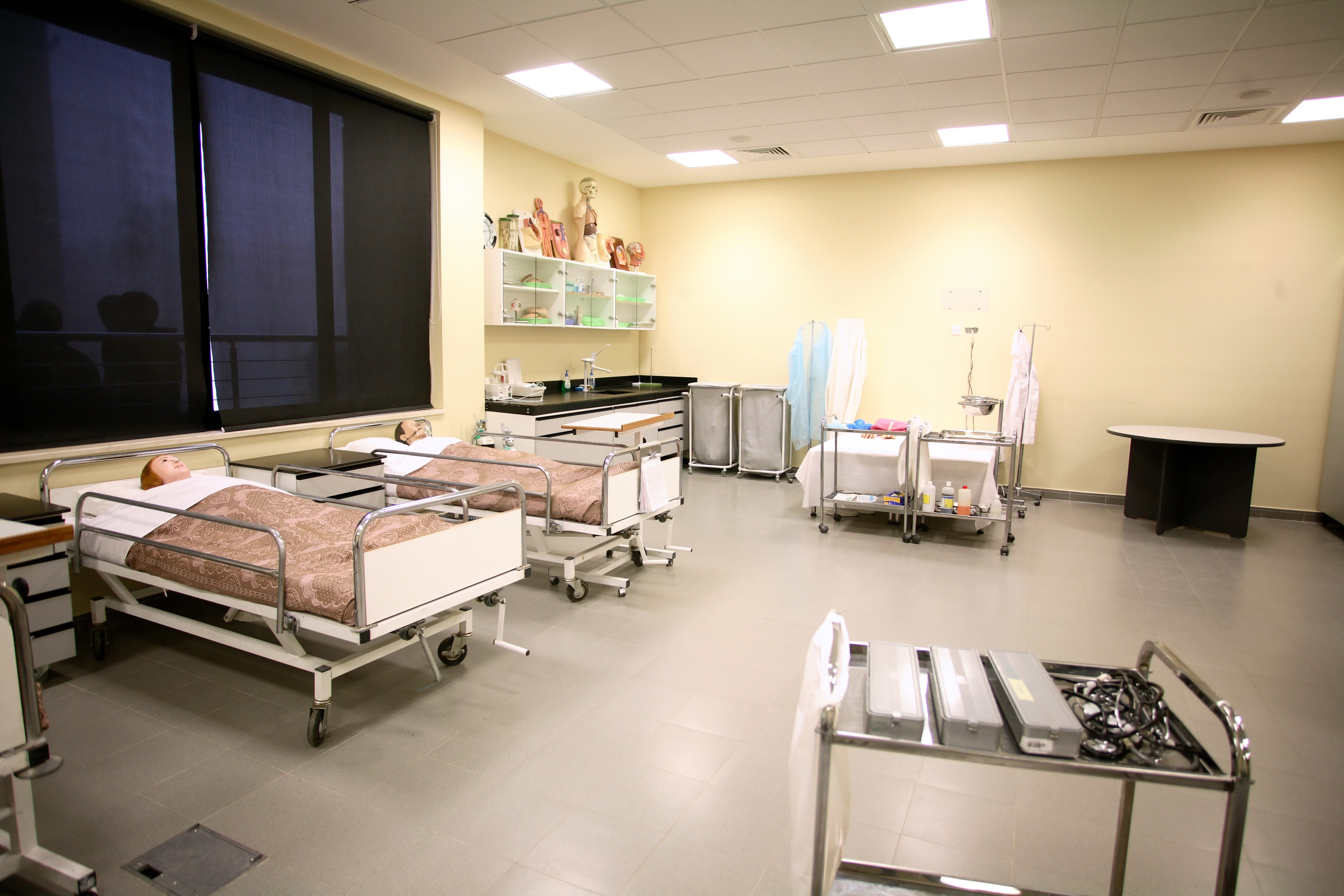
Students hands-on Training

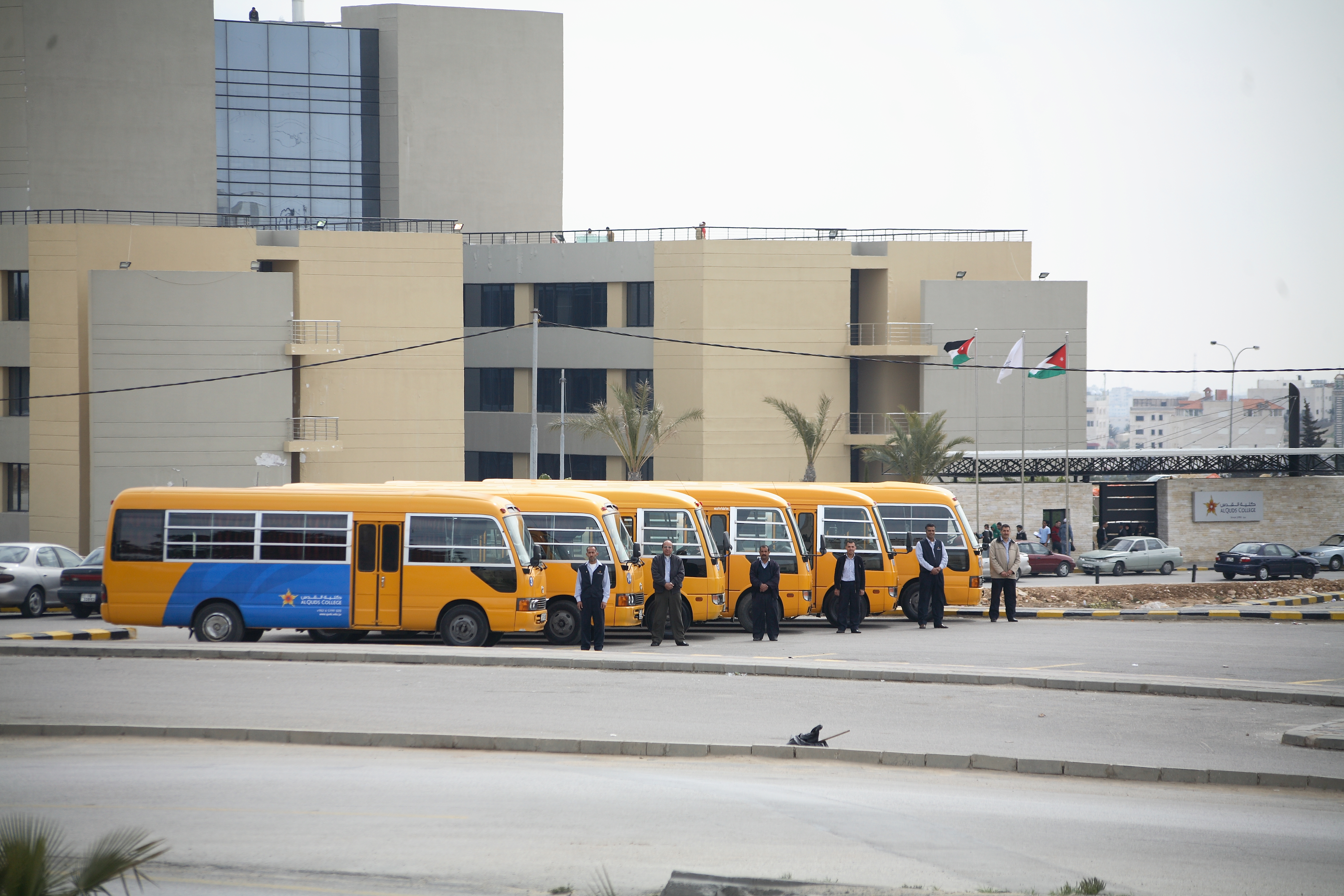
Transportation provided for students and staff
