= Monica Kurth =

American politician (born 1950)

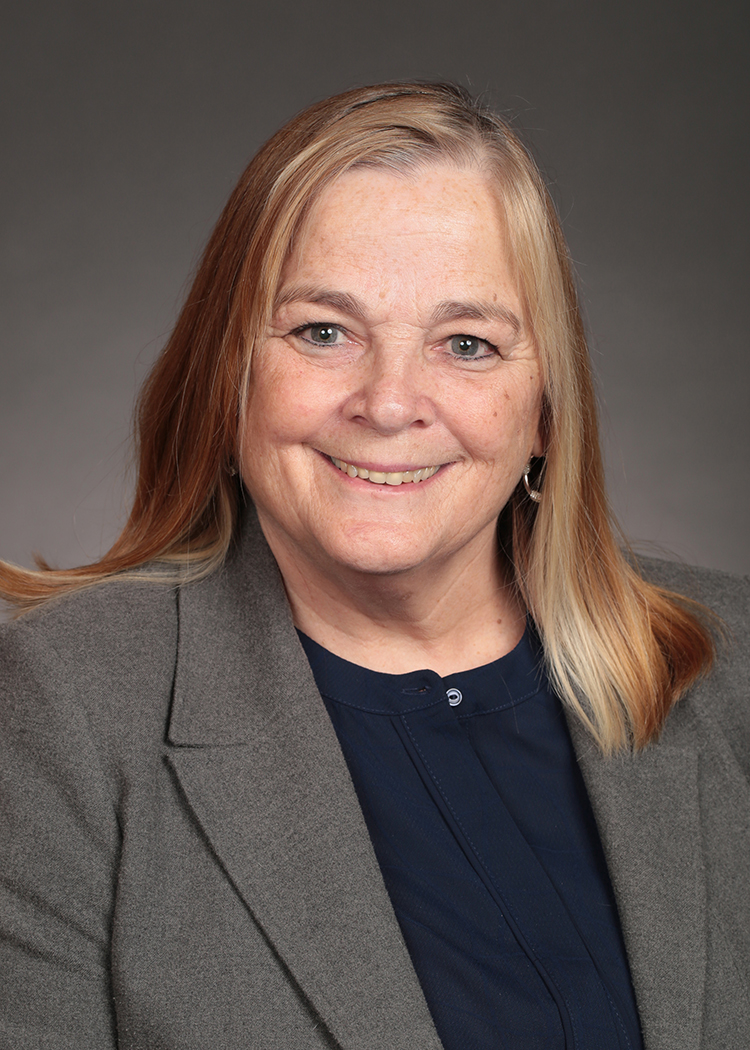

Member of the Iowa House of Representatives from the 98th district
- Incumbent
- Assumed office January 1, 2023
- Preceded by: Mary Wolfe

Member of the Iowa House of Representatives from the 89th district
- In office January 1, 2017 – January 1, 2023
- Preceded by: Jim Lykam
- Succeeded by: Elinor Levin

Personal details
- Born: 1950 (age 75–76) Cascade, Iowa, U.S.
- Party: Democratic

Monica Kurth (born 1950) is an American educator and politician. A member of the Democratic Party, she has served in the Iowa House of Representatives since 2017.

== Biography ==
Kurth was born in 1950 in Cascade, Iowa, but is from Davenport, Iowa. She taught at Scott Community College. In 2017, she won a special election to the Iowa House of Representatives to fill the seat vacated by Jim Lykam for the 89th district. She subsequently won reelection in 2018 and 2020. In 2022, she ran and won in the 98th district. She will not be seeking re-election at the end of her current term. She is a member of the Democratic Party.

== Election history ==
=== 2017 ===
2017 Iowa State House district 89 special election
Party	Candidate	Votes	%
Democratic	Monica Kurth	2,081	72.4
Republican	Michael Gonzales	784	27.3
Write-in		9	0.3

=== 2018 ===
Kurth ran unopposed in both the primary and general elections in 2018.

=== 2020 ===
2020 Iowa State House district 89 election
Party	Candidate	Votes	%
Democratic	Monica Kurth	7,967	54.8
Republican	Sean Hanley	6,159	42.3
No party	Jonathan Vance	414	2.8
Write-in		7	0.0

=== 2022 ===
Due to redistricting, Kurth ran in the 98th district in 2022.

2022 Iowa State House district 98 election
Party	Candidate	Votes	%
Democratic	Monica Kurth	7,967	92.7
Write-in		442	7.3

Iowa House of Representatives
Preceded by Mary Wolfe	98th District; 2023 – present	Succeeded by Incumbent
Preceded by Jim Lykam	89th District; 2017 – 2023	Succeeded by Elinor Levin
