= Sandy Greiner =

American politician (born 1945)

Sandra H. Greiner
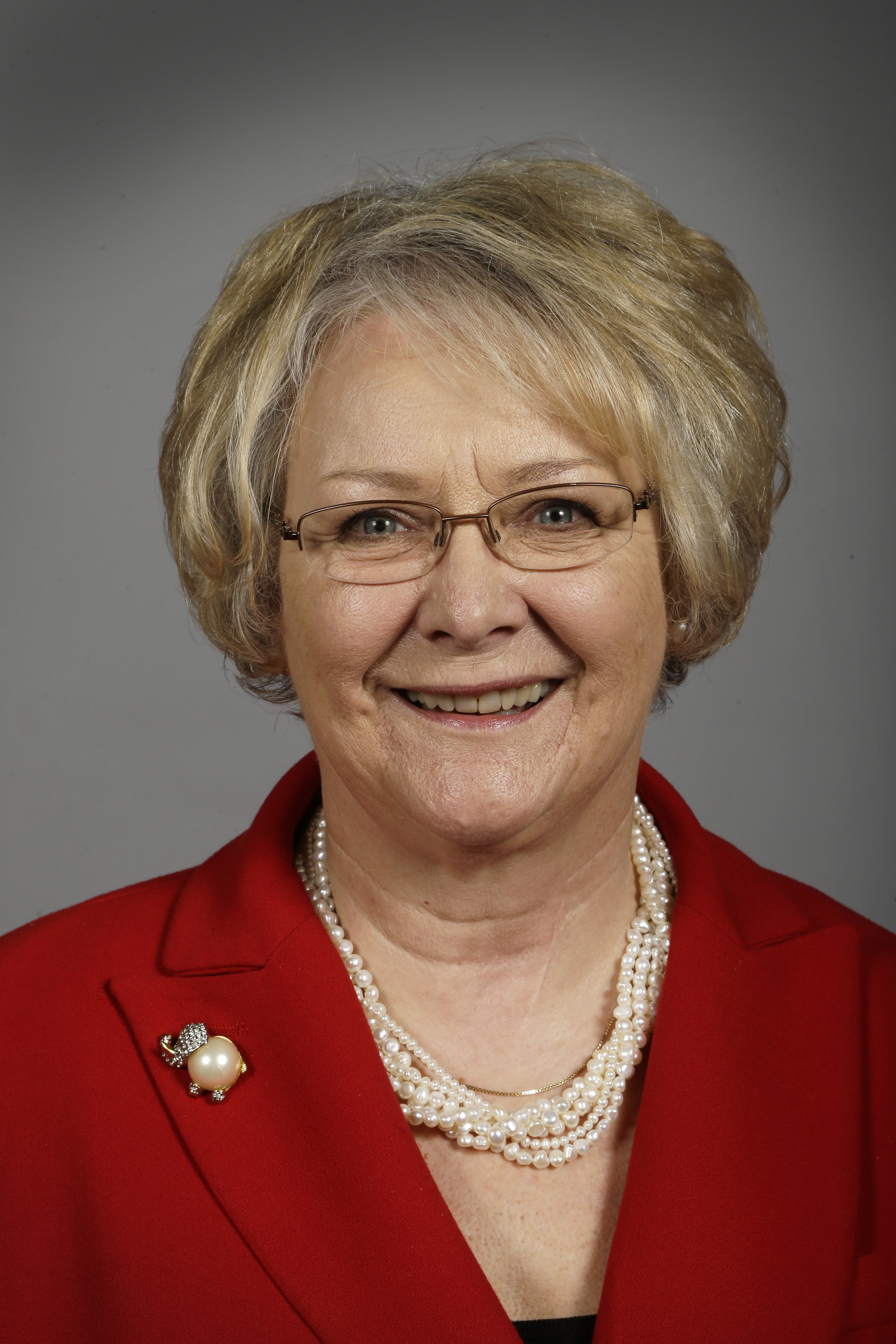

Member of the Iowa Senate from the 45th district
- In office 13 January 2011 – 13 January 2013

Member of the Iowa House of Representatives from the 89th district
- In office 2003–2009
- Preceded by: Steve Richardson
- Succeeded by: Larry Marek
- In office 1993–2001

Personal details
- Born: October 26, 1945 (age 80) Washington, Iowa, U.S.
- Party: Republican
- Spouse: Terrence
- Education: Stephens College
- Occupation: Farmer
- Profession: Farmer, Political Activist
- Website: sandygreiner.com Greiner's legislative website

Sandra H. "Sandy" Greiner (born October 26, 1945) is Iowa state senator for District 45. She was the Iowa State Representative from the 89th District, first elected in 1992. She served in the Iowa House of Representatives from 1993 until 2001, then served briefly in the Iowa Senate, until she decided to return to her House seat in 2003. She continued to serve in the House until her retirement in 2009.

Greiner served on several committees in the Iowa House - the Agriculture committee; the Environmental Protection; and the State Government committee. Her political experience includes serving with the Washington County Republican Central Committee.

Greiner was re-elected in 2006 with 5,756 votes (55%), defeating Democratic opponent Mark Nolte. After announcing her retirement in 2008, Greiner endorsed Jarad Klein to replace her. However, his campaign fell 157 votes short. In the summer of 2008, Greiner ran unsuccessfully for National Committeewoman for the Republican Party of Iowa

Greiner has served as President of the Board for the American Future Fund since July 2009.

Greiner also founded the Draft Terry Branstad PAC with the intention of convincing former Iowa governor Terry Branstad to run for his old office. In October 2009, Branstad announced that he would in fact run for governor. Greiner transformed the PAC into the NextGen PAC.

== Comeback ==
On March 6, 2010, Greiner announced at the Washington County GOP Convention that she would challenge State Senator Becky Schmitz for Iowa Senate District 45. Greiner had previously passed on a run, but then reconsidered. Her candidacy comprises one of the top recruitments for the Republican Senate leadership, and turns the Republican-leaning district into a strong pickup opportunity for Senate Republicans. She was elected.

In 2011, she expressed very strong reservations about a proposal to establish a policy institute at Iowa State University named for a sitting elected official, U.S. Senator Tom Harkin. First, she objected to its lack of transparency; the Iowa regents publicly proposed a plan that they had been working on without notice to the public or to legislators. Second, she objected that it would confer undue political advantage to the elected official for whom it was named. Third, the private donations to pay for would in some cases amount to bribes paid by private interests before Senator Harkin. The Harkin Institute officially opened that November.

Iowa House of Representatives
| Preceded by Steve Richardson | 89th District; 2003 – present | Succeeded by Incumbent |
