= Mary Wolfe =

American politician (born 1963)

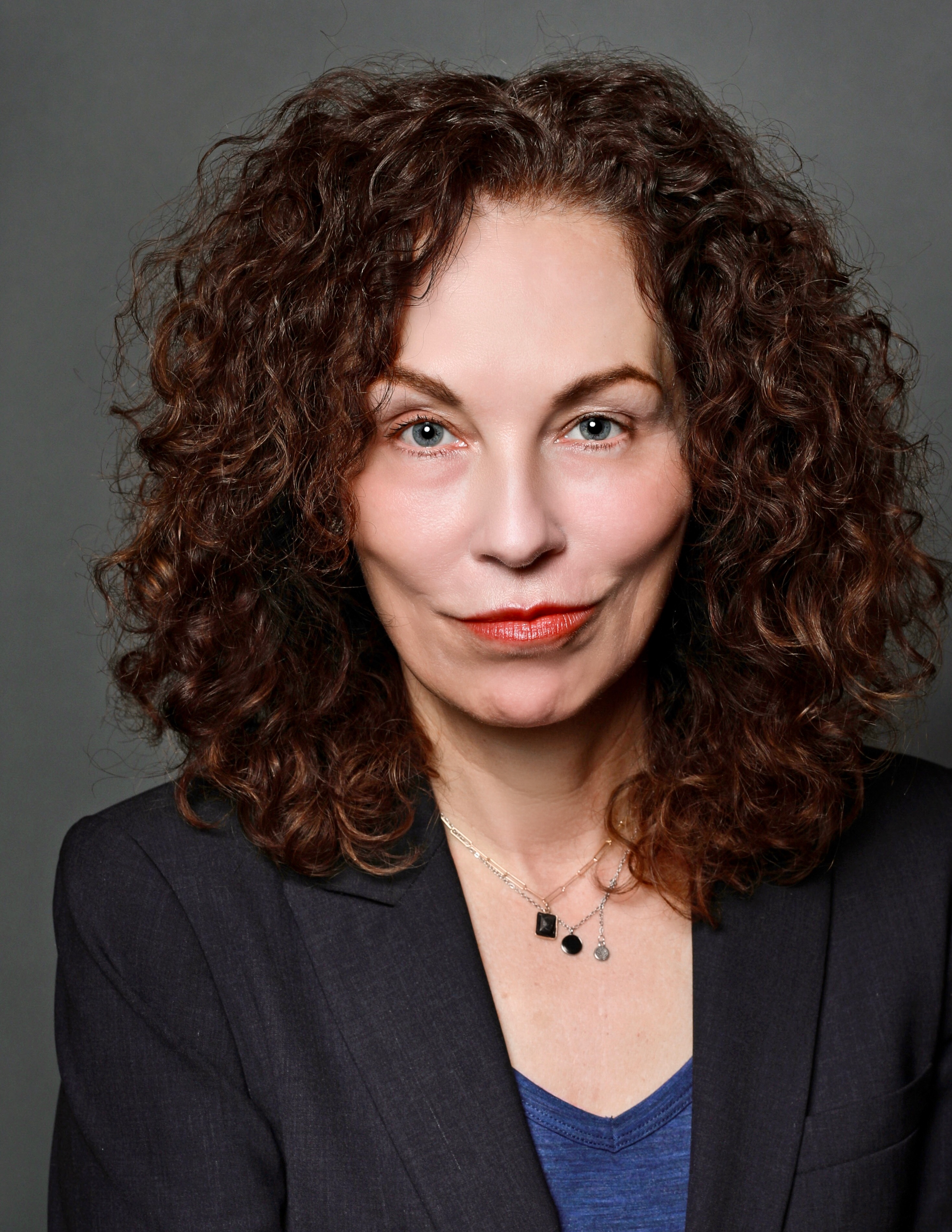

Member of the Iowa House of Representatives from the 98th district
- In office January 10, 2011 – January 9, 2023
- Preceded by: Polly Bukta
- Succeeded by: Monica Kurth (redistricting)

Personal details
- Born: 1963 (age 62–63) Washington, D.C., U.S.
- Party: Democratic
- Occupation: Attorney

Mary Lynn Wolfe (born 1963) is an attorney and a former Democratic member of the Iowa House of Representatives from the 98th district.

== Personal life ==
Wolfe holds a Bachelor of Arts degree in English and a JD from the University of Iowa. She has been an attorney in private practice with her father.

== Political career ==
In 2010, Wolfe announced that she would run to represent District 26 in the Iowa House of Representatives, after the former representative, Polly Bukta, announced that she would not run for re-election. She defeated the Republican opponent, David A. Rose, by 424 votes.

Following redistricting in 2011, Wolfe ran to represent District 98 in 2012 and won. She was re-elected to that seat four times. During her tenure, she served as the ranking member of the House Judiciary Committee. She did not seek reelection in 2022 and left office in January 2023, being succeeded by Monica Kurth.

=== Electoral record ===
2010 general election: Iowa House of Representatives, District 26
Party	Candidate	Votes	%
Democratic	Mary Wolfe	4,800	52.31%
Republican	David A. Rose	4,376	47.69%

2012 general election: Iowa House of Representatives, District 98
Party	Candidate	Votes	%
Democratic	Mary Wolfe	10,052	76.3%
Independent	Carolyn Grimes	3,129	23.7%

2016 general election: Iowa House of Representatives, District 98
Party	Candidate	Votes	%
Democratic	Mary Wolfe	8,547	66.50%
Republican	Jeannine Eldrenkamp	4,306	33.50%

2018 general election: Iowa House of Representatives, District 98
Party	Candidate	Votes	%
Democratic	Mary Wolfe	7,614	96.1%
	Other/Write-in	305	3.9%

2020 general election: Iowa House of Representatives, District 98
Party	Candidate	Votes	%
Democratic	Mary Wolfe	7,872	59.6%
Republican	Joma Short	5,329	40.3%
	Other/Write-in	16	0.1%
