= Clinton Community College (Iowa) =

Two-year public college in Clinton, Iowa, US

Coordinates: 41.834°N 90.212°W

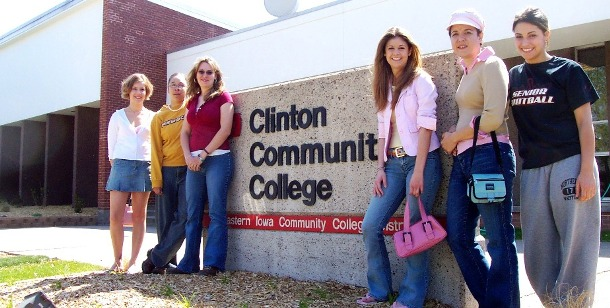
Students gather at the sign outside of the entrance to Clinton Community College, Iowa

Clinton Community College (CCC) is a two-year community college in Clinton, Iowa. The college was founded in 1946 in classrooms at the local high school. Its first class of less than 100 students was primarily composed of veterans returning from World War II.

The college offers both associate in arts/college transfer classes and a number of career technology programs. Its fall enrollment regularly exceeds 1,500 students.

The college offers intercollegiate athletics in men's basketball and women's volleyball. Its team name was changed in 1995 from the Huskers to the Cougars.

The college is part of the Eastern Iowa Community Colleges that also includes Muscatine Community College and Scott Community College. All three colleges are located near the Mississippi River. The district is accredited by the North Central Association of Colleges and Schools.

The college's main campus is located at 1000 Lincoln Boulevard. It also includes the CCC Technology Center at 1951 Manufacturing Drive in Clinton.

The college includes the Maquoketa Center in Maquoketa, Iowa. The center offers college transfer, career programs and continuing education for Maquoketa and the surrounding area.

The Paul B. Sharar Foundation for Clinton Community College raises funding to support the college, its faculty and students. Each year, the foundation awards more than 100 scholarships to the college's students.

The college is connected to the rest of Clinton via the Hill Line of the Clinton Municipal Transit Administration. The Hill Line runs Monday through Saturday to downtown Clinton.
