= Elinor Levin =

American politician (born 1987)

Elinor A. Levin
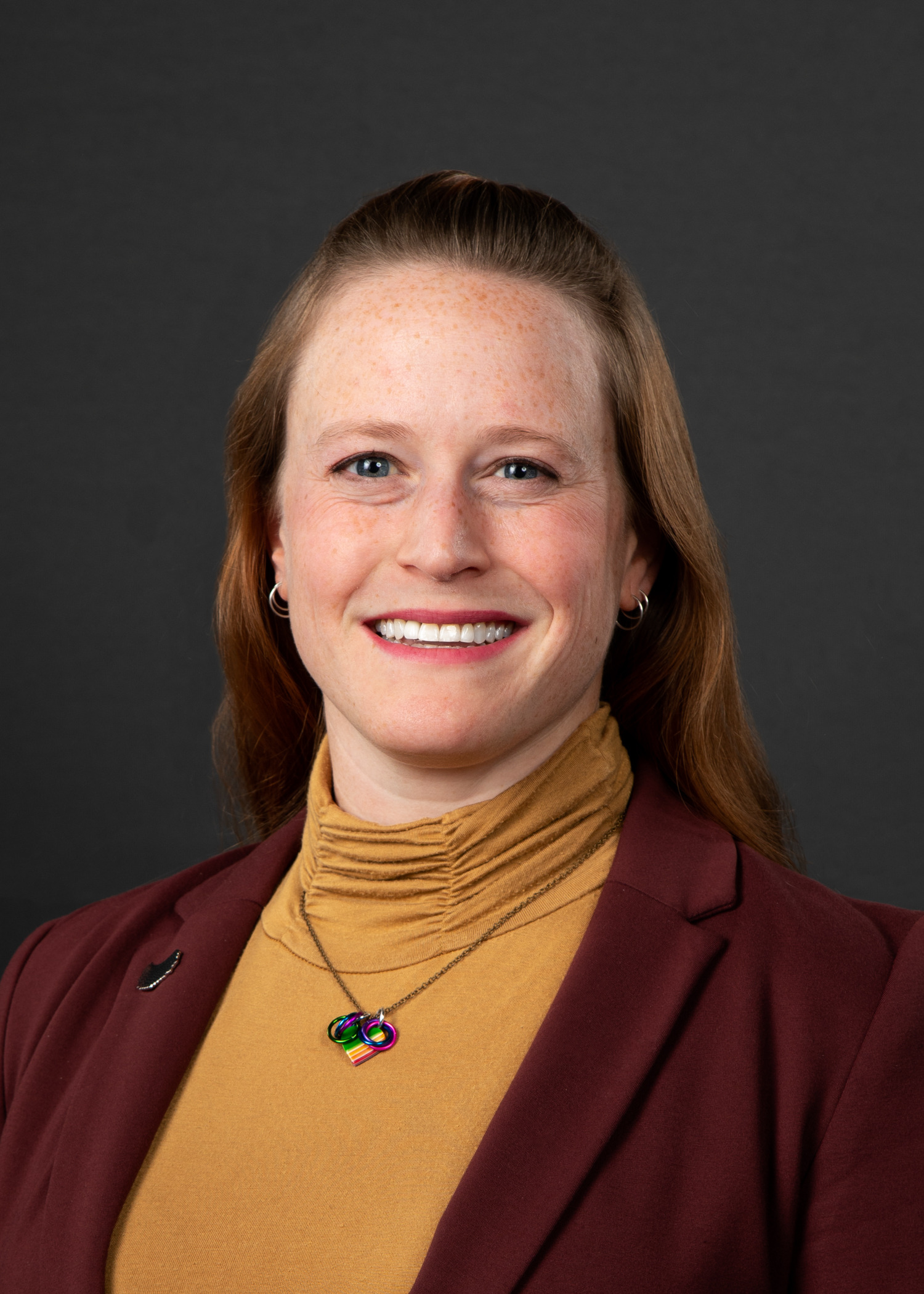

Member of the Iowa House of Representatives from the 89th district
- Incumbent
- Assumed office January 9, 2023
- Preceded by: Monica Kurth (redistricting)

Personal details
- Born: 1987 (age 38–39) Palatine, Illinois, U.S.
- Party: Democratic
- Spouse: Kevin Lawrence
- Education: Cornell College (BA)
- Occupation: Writing tutor

Elinor A. Levin (born 1987) is an American politician, tutor and former teacher who has represented the 89th district of the Iowa House of Representatives since January 2023, which consists of parts of central Johnson County, including much of southern Iowa City. She is a member of the Democratic Party.

== Early life ==
Levin was born in 1987 in Palatine, Illinois, where she was raised. She graduated from William Fremd High School in 2005. She received a Bachelor of Arts in secondary education and English from Cornell College, and moved to Coralville, Iowa, in 2009 shortly after graduating. She moved to Iowa City in 2010.

== Political career ==
Levin announced her candidacy for the open 89th district of the Iowa House of Representatives in November 2021, following decennial redistricting. She won the Democratic primaries on June 7, 2022, with over 63 percent of the vote, and defeated Republican Jacob Onken in the general election on November 8 by over 7,000 votes.

In 2024, Levin filed for reelection. She defeated Ty Bopp in the Democratic primaries on June 4, 2024, by over 1,100 votes, and ran unopposed in the general election on November 5, 2024.

On November 3, 2026, Levin received 10,686 votes, defeating Daniel Arch in the general election by more than 9500 votes.

Levin currently serves on the Agriculture, Environmental Protection, Natural Resources, Public Safety, and Veteran Affairs committees. She is the ranking member of the Natural Resources Committee.

Levin primarily runs on a grassroots campaign. She has said that her priorities include sustainable energy and combatting rural flight. She does not support the use of eminent domain for the construction of CO_{2} pipelines. She is pro-choice.

== Personal life ==
Levin is married to Kevin Lawrence, a United States Navy officer. They reside in Iowa City. She is a private writing tutor and a former public school teacher.

Levin is of Jewish descent though is not religious. She has described herself as queer.

== Electoral history ==
Election	Political result	Candidate	Party	Votes	%
Iowa House of Representatives Democratic primary elections, 2022; District 89; Turnout: 2,686	Democratic (newly redistricted)	Elinor Levin	Democratic	1,694	63.1
Iowa House of Representatives Democratic primary elections, 2022; District 89; Turnout: 2,686	Democratic (newly redistricted)	Tony Currin	Democratic	987	36.7
Iowa House of Representatives Democratic primary elections, 2022; District 89; Turnout: 2,686	Democratic (newly redistricted)	Other/Write-in votes		5	0.2
Iowa House of Representatives general elections, 2022; District 89; Turnout: 10,907	Democratic (newly redistricted)	Elinor Levin	Democratic	8,965	82.2
Iowa House of Representatives general elections, 2022; District 89; Turnout: 10,907	Democratic (newly redistricted)	Jacob Onken	Republican	1,937	17.8
Iowa House of Representatives general elections, 2022; District 89; Turnout: 10,907	Democratic (newly redistricted)	Other/Write-in votes		5	0.05
