= Mark A. Haverland =

American politician

Member of the Iowa House of Representatives from the 77th district
- In office January 10, 1983 – January 10, 1993
- Preceded by: John Pelton
- Succeeded by: Wayne H. McKinney

Member of the Iowa House of Representatives from the 65th district
- In office 1993–1995
- Preceded by: Charles Poncy
- Succeeded by: Jeff Lamberti

Personal details
- Born: July 6, 1946 (age 80) St. Cloud, Minnesota, United States
- Party: Democratic
- Education: Princeton University (BA); Harvard Divinity School (M.Div)

Mark A. Haverland (born July 6, 1946) is a former American politician in the state of Iowa.

Haverland was born in St. Cloud, Minnesota. He graduated Technical Senior High School. He served in the Iowa House of Representatives from 1983 to 1995 as a Democrat.
