= Muscatine Community College =

Public community college in Muscatine, Iowa, U.S.

- Type: Public community college
- Established: 1929
- Parent institution: Eastern Iowa Community Colleges
- Location: Muscatine, Iowa, United States; 41.443°N 91.029°W
- Website: Official website

Muscatine Community College (MCC) is a public community college in Muscatine, Iowa. Founded in 1929, MCC is the oldest college in the Eastern Iowa Community Colleges that also includes Clinton Community College and Scott Community College. The college offers both arts and sciences/college transfer classes as well as several career technology programs. Its fall enrollment regularly exceeds 1,850 students.

The Muscatine Community College Foundation was founded in 1961 to support the college's educational programs, student and staff development, facilities improvement and alumni development. Its emphasis is on student scholarships and loans, with more than $230,000 awarded annually to MCC students for tuition, fees and books.
