= Gerald D. Jones =

American politician (1933–2021)

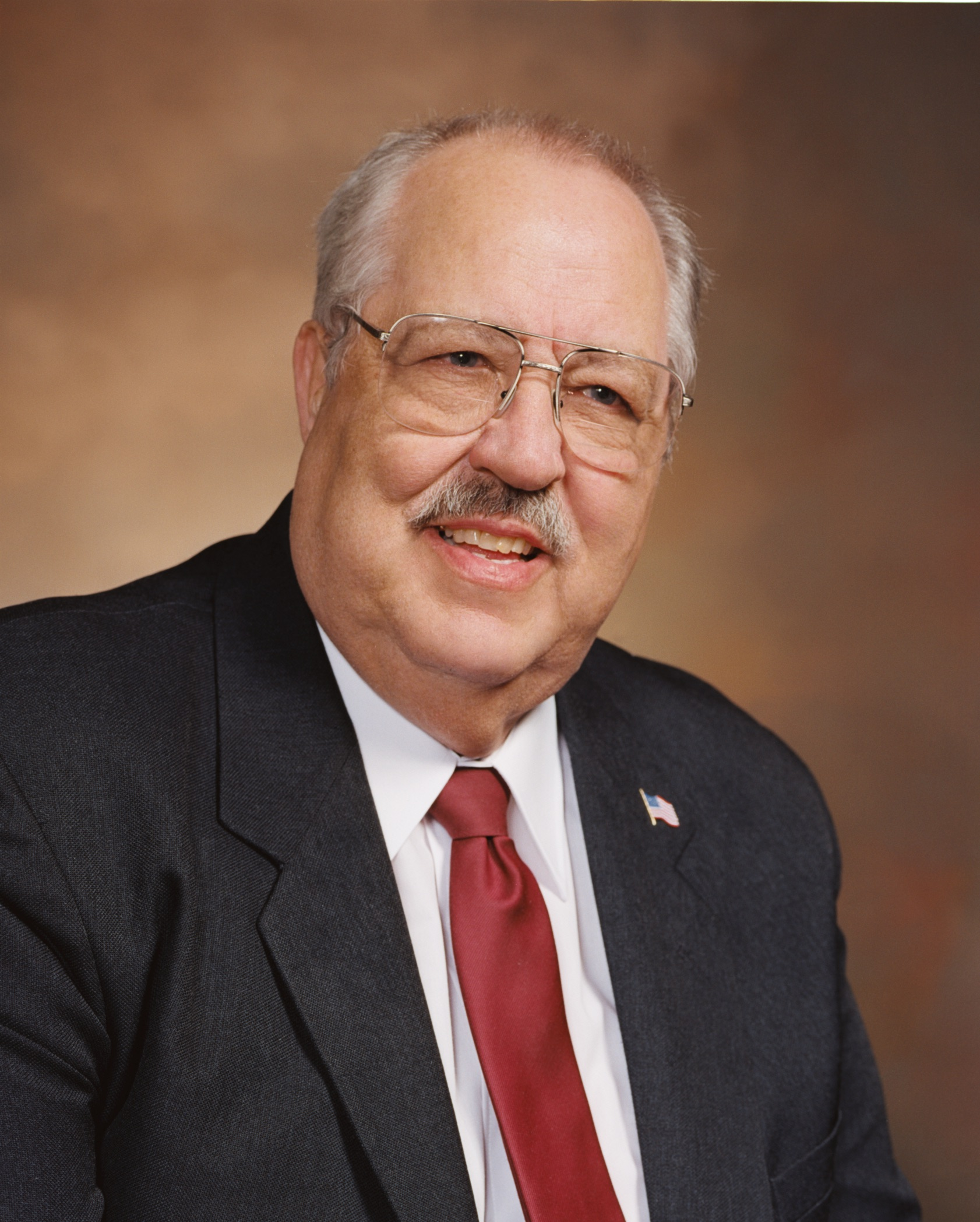

Member of the Iowa House of Representatives
- In office June 2, 2001 – January 7, 2007

Personal details
- Born: Gerald Dwayne Jones; January 11, 1933 Silver City, Iowa, U.S.
- Died: October 5, 2021 (aged 88)
- Party: Republican
- Spouse: Janet
- Children: 2
- Occupation: property manager

Gerald Dwayne Jones (January 11, 1933 – October 5, 2021) was an American politician in the state of Iowa.

Jones was born in Silver City, Iowa. He attended the University of California, Santa Barbara and worked in property management. A Republican, he served in the Iowa House of Representatives from 2001 to 2007 (85th district). Jones died on October 5, 2021, at the age of 88.
