= Sonja Larsen (politician) =

American politician

Member of the Iowa House of Representatives from the 89th district
- In office January 8, 1979 – January 11, 1981
- Preceded by: Charles Poncy
- Succeeded by: Charles Poncy

Personal details
- Born: Sonja Leistad; February 1, 1941 (age 85) Elk Horn, Shelby County, Iowa, United States
- Party: Republican
- Spouse: Richard Larsen
- Children: 3
- Occupation: Realtor

Sonja Larsen (born February 1, 1941) is a former American politician from the state of Iowa who served as a Republican in the Iowa House of Representatives for Ottumwa's 89th House District from 1979 to 1981, succeeding Charles Poncy before she was in turn succeeded by him the following election.

Larsen was born in Elk Horn, Shelby County, Iowa in 1941 to Marie and Einar Leistad. She attended Elk Horn-Kimballton Community schools, graduating in 1959. She married Richard Larsen, having three children.

Iowa House of Representatives
Preceded by Charles Poncy	89th district 1979–1981	Succeeded by Charles Poncy
