= Shannon Lundgren =

American politician (born 1972)

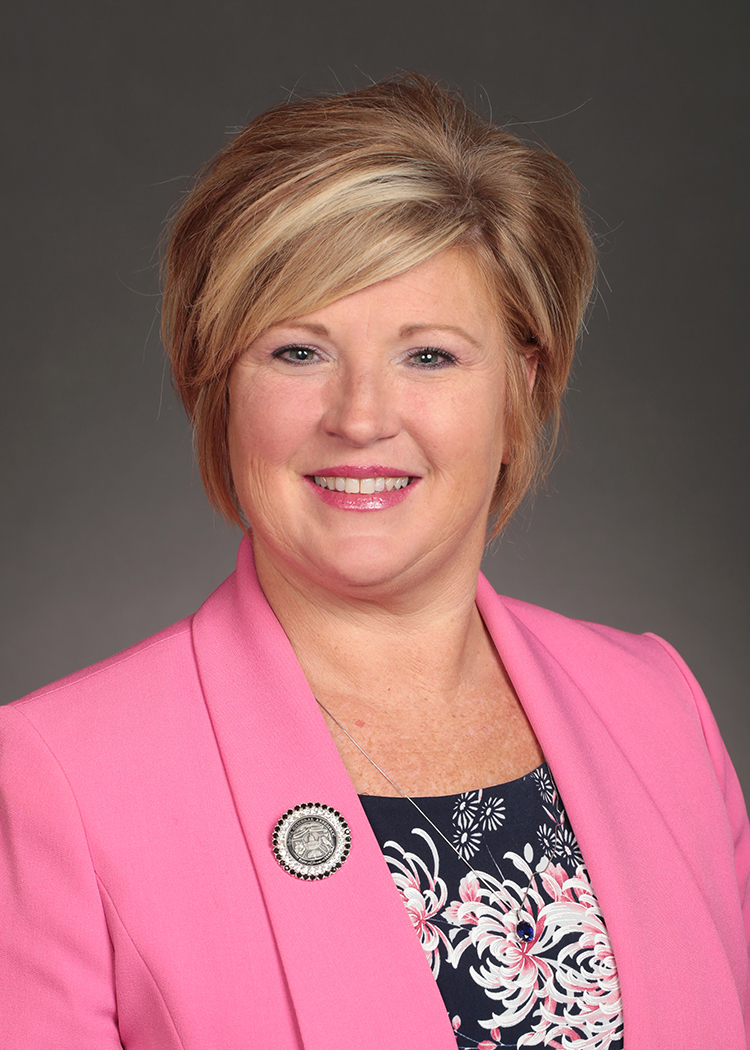

Member of the Iowa House of Representatives
- Incumbent
- Assumed office January 9, 2017
- Preceded by: Nancy Dunkel
- Constituency: 57th district (2017–2023); 65th district (2023-present)

Personal details
- Born: Shannon Lynn Fluhr; April 4, 1972 (age 54) Dubuque, Iowa, U.S.
- Party: Republican
- Spouse: Charlie Lundgren
- Children: 2
- Education: Midwest Travel and Hospitality Institute (AA)

Shannon Lynn Lundgren (née Fluhr) is an American politician who sits in the Iowa House of Representatives.

== Early life ==
On April 4, 1972, Lundgren was born in Dubuque, Iowa.

== Education ==
Lundgren attended Midwest Travel & Hospitality Institute and became a certified travel agent.

== Career ==
Lundgren's career started in the travel industry. From 1996 to 2001, she was a sales manager of Eagle Ridge Inn and Resort. Since 2006, she is the co-owner of Trackside Bar & Grill. Lundgren is passionate about passing a smoking ban in Iowa casinos.

Lundgren is a member of the Iowa Republican Party. In 2018, her political career began when she won the election to become a Representative in the Iowa State House of Representative. In July 2026, Lundgren wrote a character letter on official Iowa House of Representatives letterhead to the court on behalf of David John Lehmann, who had been convicted of molesting a child, asking the judge to consider his positive character and community involvement when imposing his sentence. The decision drew criticism from members of the community and others, with critics arguing that a state legislator should prioritize the interests and safety of victims of child sexual abuse; Lundgren nevertheless defended her decision to write the letter. She represents district 65.

== Personal life ==
Lundgren's husband is Charlie. They have two children. Lundgren and her family reside in Peosta, Iowa.
