= First Federal Savings and Loan Association Building =

- U.S. National Register of Historic Places
- U.S. Historic district – Contributing property
- Davenport Register of Historic Properties
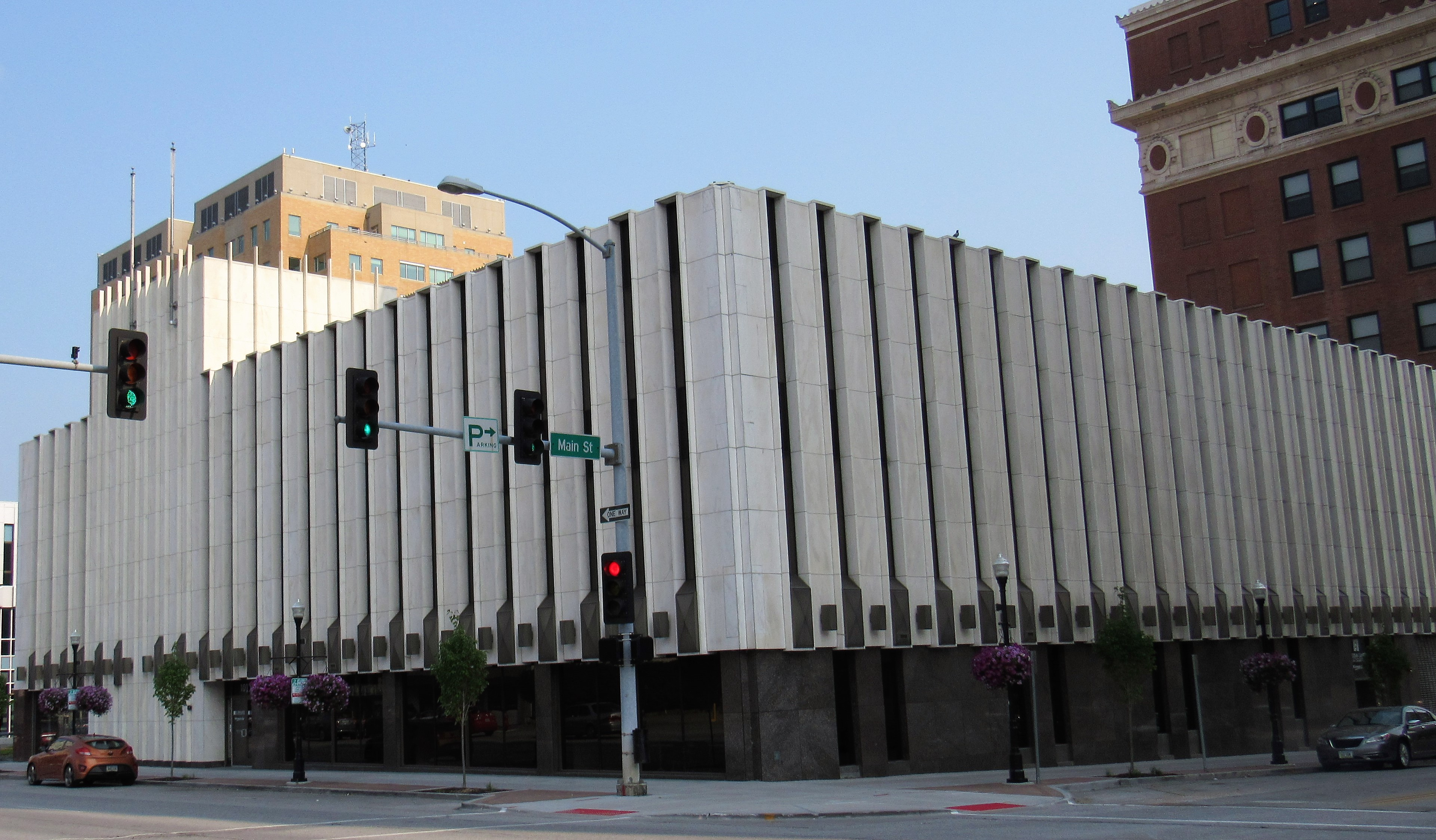
- First Federal Savings and Loan Association Building in 2018

- Location within Iowa Location within the United States
- Location: 131 W. Third St. Davenport, Iowa
- Coordinates: 41°31′19.6″N 90°34′30.8″W
- Area: less than one acre
- Built: 1965-1966
- Architect: William F. Cann
- Architectural style: Modern Movement
- Part of: Davenport Downtown Commercial Historic District (ID100005546)
- NRHP reference No.: 16000577
- DRHP No.: 57

Significant dates
- Added to NRHP: October 25, 2016
- Designated CP: September 11, 2020
- Designated DRHP: January 27, 2016

The First Federal Savings and Loan Association Building is a historic building located in Downtown Davenport, Iowa, United States. It was individually listed on the Davenport Register of Historic Properties and on the National Register of Historic Places in 2016. In 2020 it was included as a contributing property in the Davenport Downtown Commercial Historic District.

== History ==
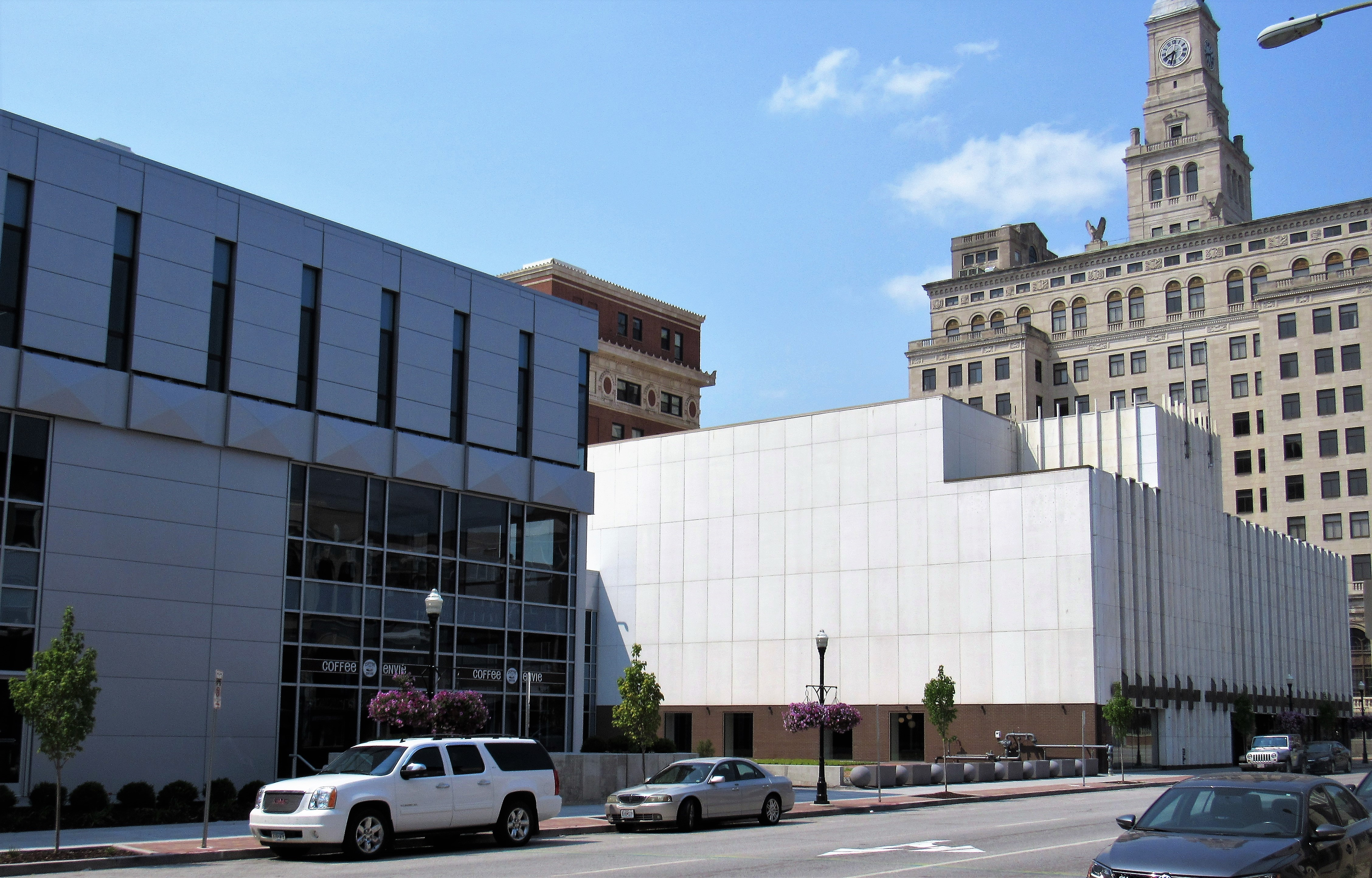
The Scott Community College Urban Campus

First Federal Savings and Loan Association was incorporated in December 1933, and it was one of the financial institutions in the city that survived the Great Depression. They began leasing the Lane Building in 1936 and purchased it three years later. Their operating budget grew from $5,487 in 1935 to $287,776 in 1941, and its assets from $14.8 million in 1947 to $53.5 million in 1959. They were primarily focused on financing new home construction and purchases, as well as capitalizing Davenport's growth in the mid-20th century. By 1966 when this building was completed, First Federal was the largest Savings and loan association in eastern Iowa and western Illinois. The three-story Modern movement building was designed by William F. Cann of the Bank Building and Equipment Corp. of St. Louis. It was built at the same location of their previous building. This is one of the first and most architecturally significant modern buildings in Davenport. First Federal opened their first branch location on the north side of town in 1968.

The savings and loan reorganized as First Federal Savings Bank in 1993. It was folded into Mercantile Bank two years later. Mercantile moved their downtown headquarters in 1997, and this building was converted into an office building. It was vacated in 2015. The building has been connected to the neighboring First Midwest building to create a new urban campus for Scott Community College. Saratoga Capital Group of St. Louis designed the new campus. Renovation of the First Federal building was completed in time for classes to begin in January 2018.

== Architecture ==
The exterior of the reinforced concrete structure is clad in white Vermont marble. It represents a move away from the transparent “glass box” design and toward the use of mass, form and masonry cladding. A unique feature of the building was its original drive-through window. The entrance was off Main Street on the west side of the building, and the customer would literally drive through the building and eventually exit onto West Third Street. The interior drive-through was eliminated when the building was renovated in 1975, and a new drive-through was built onto the east side. The mezzanine in the former financial services hall was eliminated in a 2002 building project when new office space was created. The conversion of the building into a college facility in 2018 left the exterior intact while reconfiguring the interior. Inspiration for the renovation project came from the Learning Commons at the University of Iowa.
