= Tyler Olson (politician) =

American politician (born 1976)

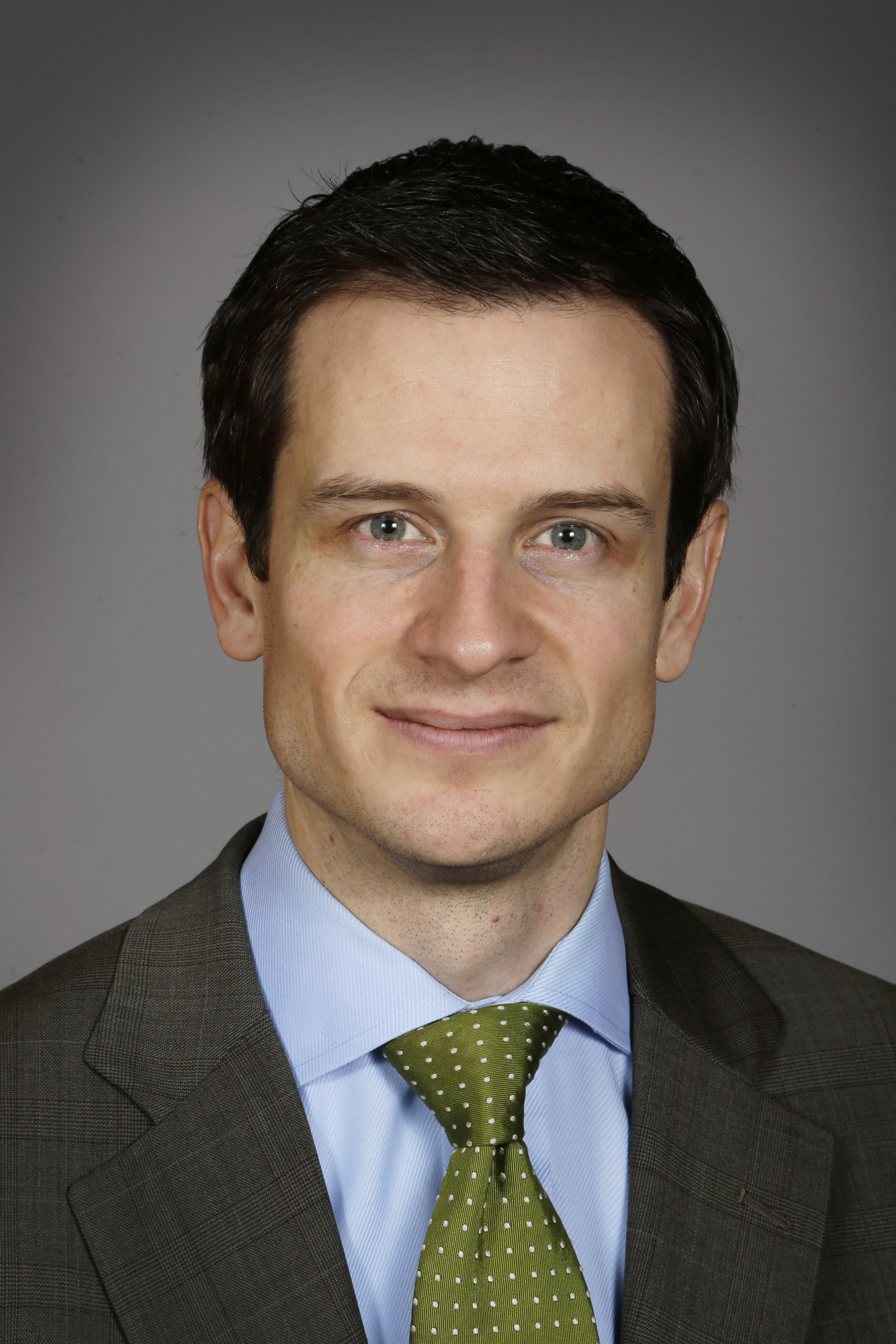

Member of the Iowa House of Representatives from the 65th district 38th (2007 – 2013)
- In office January 8, 2007 – January 11, 2015
- Preceded by: Rob Hogg
- Succeeded by: Liz Bennett

Personal details
- Born: 1976 (age 49–50) Cedar Rapids, Iowa, U.S.
- Party: Democratic
- Children: Leo; Willa
- Education: Claremont McKenna College; University of Iowa
- Website: Government website

Tyler Olson, is a former Iowa State Representative from the 38th District. A member of the Democratic Party, he served in the Iowa House of Representatives from 2007 to 2015. He also was chairman of the Iowa Democratic Party from January to June 2013. He received his BA from Claremont McKenna College and his JD from the University of Iowa College of Law.

As of November 2013, Olson is on several committees in the Iowa House - as a member of the Commerce and Judiciary committees and as the ranking member of the Appropriations Committee. He also is a member of the Medical Assistance Projections and Assessment Council and of the Single Point of Entry Long-term Living Resources System Team. His prior political experience includes working on the Linn County Democratic Central Committee Finance Committee, working as finance director for Rob Tully for Congress in 1998, and working as assistant finance director for the Democratic Congressional Campaign Committee from 1999 to 2000. Olson announced a run for Governor of Iowa in 2013, but ultimately dropped out of the race.

== Electoral history ==
*incumbent

Election	Political result	Candidate	Party	Votes	%
Iowa House of Representatives elections, 2006; District 38; Turnout: 11,045	Democratic hold	Tyler Olson	Democratic	7,148	64.7
Iowa House of Representatives elections, 2006; District 38; Turnout: 11,045	Democratic hold	Don Palmer	Republican	3,894	35.3
Iowa House of Representatives elections, 2008; District 38	Democratic hold	Tyler Olson*	Democratic	unopposed	
Iowa House of Representatives elections, 2010; District 38; Turnout: 10,793	Democratic hold	Tyler Olson*	Democratic	7,136	66.1
Iowa House of Representatives elections, 2010; District 38; Turnout: 10,793	Democratic hold	Jason M. Marshall	Independent	1,410	13.1
Iowa House of Representatives elections, 2012; District 65	Democratic hold	Tyler Olson*	Democratic	unopposed	

Iowa House of Representatives
Preceded by Ruth Ann Gaines	65th District; 2013 – present	Succeeded by Liz Bennett
Preceded by Rob Hogg	38th District; 2007 – 2013	Succeeded by Kevin Koester
