= Jeff Lamberti =

American politician

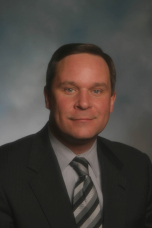

Personal details
- Born: October 21, 1962 (age 63) Ankeny, Iowa, U.S.
- Party: Republican
- Education: Drake University (BA, MBA, JD)

Jeffrey M. Lamberti (born October 21, 1962, in Ankeny, Iowa) is a former Republican Senate leader and two term state senator representing the 35th District of the Iowa Senate, and served two terms as State Representative.

In 1998, Lamberti gained national attention for his sponsorship of a bill imposing chemical castration as a parole condition for sex offenders. The bill passed and as of 2026 remains on the books of the Iowa Code; an April 2026 review of "red tape" regulations by the Iowa Department of Corrections, reported that the "utilization rate is extremely low" for the measure.

In the 2006 mid-term election, Lamberti was the Republican nominee for U.S. Congress in Iowa's 3rd congressional district, losing to incumbent Democrat Leonard Boswell in a hotly contested race. Lamberti received 47% of the vote to Boswell's 52%. He was succeeded in the Iowa Senate by Republican Larry Noble.

Lamberti was nominated to the Iowa Racing and Gaming Commission by Gov. Terry Branstad. He was elected as its chairman on June 7, 2012, and his term expired on April 30, 2014.

Lamberti is an attorney and is president of Lamberti, Gocke, & Leutje Law Offices. He is the son of Donald Lamberti, founder of Ankeny-based Casey's General Stores. He is the current owner of the Indoor Football League's Iowa Barnstormers (formerly of the Arena Football League and af2).

== Electoral history ==
Iowa State House 065 election, 1994
Party	Candidate	Votes	%
Republican	Jeff Lamberti	7,455	56.43
Democratic	Mark A. Haverland (inc.)	5,756	43.57
Independent		1	0.01
Total votes		13,212	100.00
Republican gain from Democratic			

Iowa State House 065 election, 1996
Party	Candidate	Votes	%
Republican	Jeff Lamberti (inc.)	9,299	59.89
Democratic	Paul Gnade	6,211	40.00
Other		16	0.10
Total votes		15,526	100.00

Iowa State Senate 33 election, 1998
Party	Candidate	Votes	%
Republican	Jeff Lamberti	17,147	84.23
Reform	Alan Palmer	3,146	15.45
Independent	Blank/Scattering	64	0.34
Total votes		20,357	100.00
Republican gain from Democratic			

Iowa State Senate 35 election, 2002
Party	Candidate	Votes	%
Republican	Jeff Lamberti	18,117	98.35
Independent		304	1.65
Total votes		18,421	100.00
Republican gain from Democratic			

Iowa's 3rd congressional district election, 2006
Party	Candidate	Votes	%
Democratic	Leonard Boswell (inc.)	115,769	51.90
Republican	Jeff Lamberti	103,722	46.50
Socialist Workers	Helen Meyers	3,591	1.61
Total votes		223,082	100.00
