= Lawrence Pope =

American politician (1940–2013)

Lawrence Edgar Pope (February 29, 1940 – May 22, 2013) was an American educator and politician.

Born in Rockford, Illinois, Pope grew up in Des Moines, Iowa. He received his bachelors and law degrees from Drake University. He practiced law, was a lobbyist, and was a law professor at Drake University Law School. He served in the Iowa House of Representatives as a Republican 1979–1983. He died in Des Moines, Iowa.
