= Scott Community College =

Community college in Riverdale, Iowa, U.S.

- Type: Public
- Established: July 1966
- Chancellor: Donald S. Doucette July, 2011 to present
- President: Ann Lawler Interim President
- Students: 7,644
- Undergraduates: Pre-university students Technical college students
- Location: Riverdale, Iowa, United States
- Colors: Red and Blue
- Nickname: Eagles
- Website: www.eicc.edu/scc

Scott Community College is a community college in Riverdale, Iowa, near Bettendorf, and is part of the Eastern Iowa Community Colleges that also includes Clinton Community College and Muscatine Community College.

== History ==
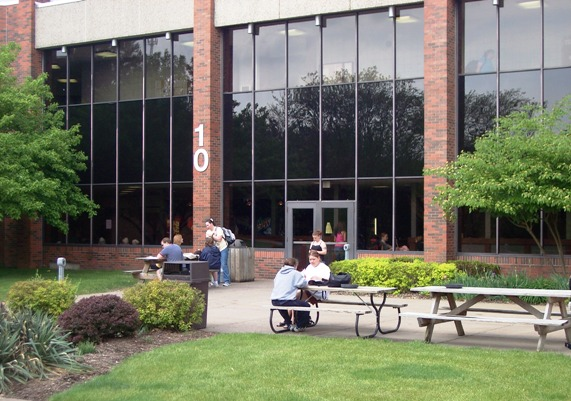
The patio area behind Scott Community College's main building.

Scott Community College (or SCC, as it is known by students and faculty) became an entity in July 1966, the same year legislation in the Iowa General Assembly created the state's 15 community college districts, one of those being the Eastern Iowa Community College District. Offices were in downtown Bettendorf.

SCC traces its ancestry to the former Davenport Area Technical School, a technical and vocational school administered by the Davenport School District; and Palmer Junior College, that offered two-year liberal arts programs.

SCC's first term was Fall 1966, with tuition $150 per semester, or $10 per class for part-time students. More courses of study were added to the old Davenport Area Trade School's list of offerings, including auto body and repair, secretarial and clerical, and drafting.

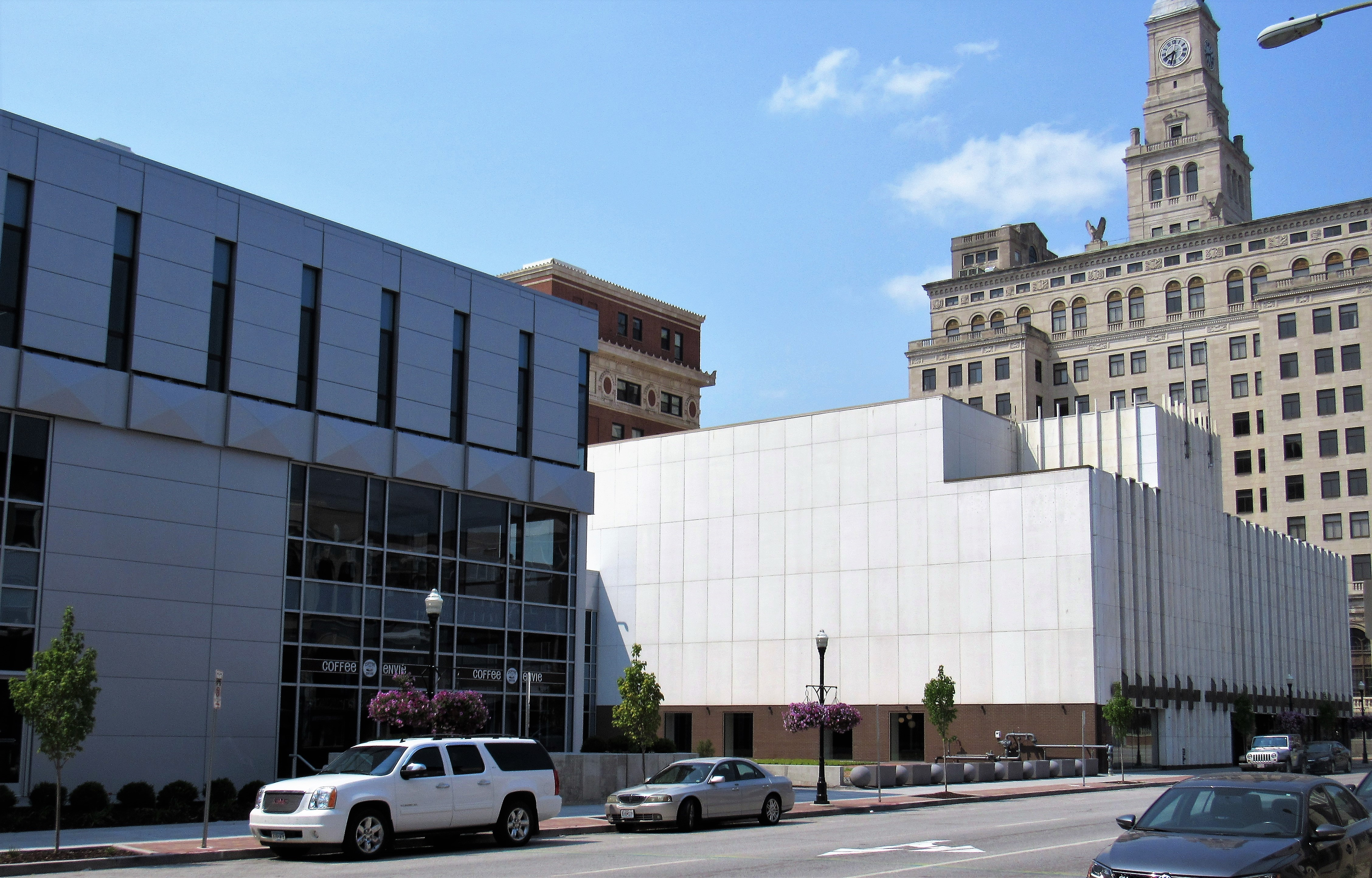
The urban campus in downtown Davenport.

The main campus on Belmont Road in Riverdale opened in 1969. (The college has a Bettendorf mailing address but is, technically, located in the small town of Riverdale.) The campus was erected on land once owned by Alcoa. At first, the campus housed technology programs, but soon expanded to offer liberal arts/college transfer programs. The SCC campus was expanded in 1987 and again in the mid-1990s.

The college now includes a number of locations in addition to its main campus. The Blong Technology Center is located near Interstate 80 in Davenport. The colleges West Davenport Center was opened in 2012 delivering adult and continuing education classes. The estate of V.O. and Elizabeth Figge donated the Kahl Building in Davenport to the college in 1994. After renovations, it became the school's urban campus. In January 2018 the urban campus moved into the former First Federal Savings and Loan Association and First Midwest Bank buildings. In addition, the college offers a wide variety of online courses in cooperation with the Iowa Community College Online Consortium.

On February 5, 2007, the Eastern Iowa Community Colleges unveiled plans to turn the grounds of the former Wacky Waters Adventure Park, located near Interstate 80 in Davenport, into the Midwest Center for Public Safety Training to "serve as a unique training ground for firefighters".

In 1967, SCC's enrollment was just over 300 students. By 1989, the number ballooned to nearly 3,300. SCC's Fall 2014 enrollment was 4,634.

The college offers intercollegiate sports in men's and women's soccer and cross country. The teams are known as the Eagles.

== Programs ==
Scott offer both Pre-University and technical courses, in which the pre-university courses takes up four semesters which is two years total, enough for an Associate Degree, leading for the students to attend a university, usually one in the state of Iowa or Western Illinois University at their campus setting in Moline. The technical courses not just carried Associate as well but also a Certificate, 30 credits per year. The universities that the Liberal Arts and Sciences programs get transferred to are:

- Clarke University
- Mount Mercy University
- Upper Iowa University
- Western Illinois University
- University of Dubuque
- St. Ambrose University
- Iowa Wesleyan University
- University of Iowa
- Iowa State University
- University of Northern Iowa

=== Pre-University programs ===
- Arts, Communications, and English
  - Communications
  - English
  - Art
  - Theatre
  - Journalism
  - Speech
- Business
  - Business Administration
- Education
  - Elementary Education
  - Physical Education
  - Secondary Education
- Government and Public Administration, Law, and Human Resources
  - History
  - Political Science
  - Psychology
  - Sociology
  - Social Work
  - Criminal Justice
  - Pre-Law
- Health Science
  - Pre-Chiropractic
  - Pre-Dental Hygiene
  - Pre-Health Professional
- Science and Mathematics
  - Biology
  - Chemistry
  - Environmental Science
  - Mathematics
  - Physical Science
  - Physics

=== Career and technical programs ===
- Arts, Communications, and English
  - American Sign Language – English Interpreting
- Business
  - Accounting Management
  - Business Management
  - Supply Chain and Logistics
- Computers/Information Technology
  - Augmented and Virtual Reality
  - Cybersecurity
  - Programming
  - Web Development
- Construction and Architecture
  - Heating, Ventilation, and Air Conditioning (HVAC)
- Culinary Arts and Hospitality
  - Culinary Arts Apprenticeship
  - Culinary Arts
  - Hospitality Management
- Education
  - Early Childhood Education
- Health Sciences
  - Cancer Information Management
  - Certified Nurse Aide (CNA)
  - Dental assisting
  - Emergency Medical Services
  - Practical Nursing
  - Radiologic Technology
  - Respiratory Care
  - Surgical Technology
- Manufacturing
  - CNC Machining
  - Engineering Technology
    - Automation
    - Electromechanical
    - Process Control
  - Mechanical Design Technology
  - Heating, Ventilation, and Air Conditioning (HVAC)
  - Welding
    - Welding
    - Basic Welding
    - General Maintenance Welding
    - Production Welding
    - Structural Welding
- Transportation
  - Automotive Technology
  - Diesel Technology

== Scott Community College Administrators ==
=== President ===
Name	Tenure - Acting President	Tenure - President
Ann Lawler	2020-2021	
Dr. Lyn Cochran		2017-2020
Dr. Theresa Paper	July 1, 2011 – October 4, 2012	October 4, 2012 – present
Dr. Thomas Coley		June 1, 2005 – October 1, 2012
Dr. David Claeys		February 18, 2002 – June 1, 2005
Dr. Lenny Stone		1986 – February 4, 2002
Dr. John T. Blong		1982 – 1986

=== Chancellor ===
Name	Tenure - Acting Chancellor	Tenure - Chancellor
Dr. Donald S. Doucette		July 1, 2011 – present
Dr. Pat Keir		2004 – 2011
Dr. John T. Blong		1986 – 2004
