= Larry Marek =

American politician

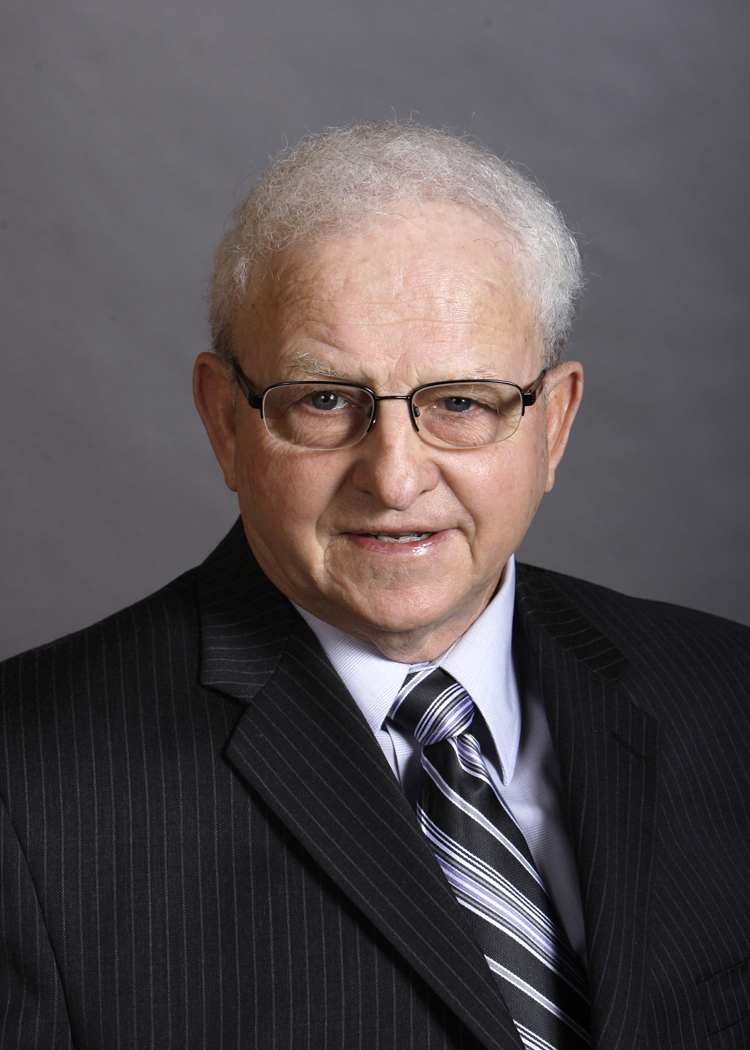

Member of the Iowa House of Representatives from the 89th district
- In office 2009–2011

Personal details
- Born: 1940 (age 85–86) Washington County, Iowa
- Party: Democratic
- Spouse: Jan
- Education: Iowa State University

Larry K. Marek (born 1940) is a Democratic politician, representing the 89th District in the Iowa House of Representatives since 2008. From Washington County, Iowa, Marek served in the Iowa National Guard for eight years. He went to the University of Iowa on a farm operation program. Marek was a farmer and was involved with the banking business.
