= Steve Richardson (politician) =

American educator and politician

Member of the Iowa House of Representatives
- In office January 13, 1997 – January 12, 2003

Personal details
- Born: December 23, 1954 (age 71) Des Moines, Iowa, U.S.
- Party: Democratic
- Spouses: Carole Tibbetts (m. 1980; div. 2004); Deb Richardson (m. 2007)
- Children: 3
- Education: Simpson College
- Occupation: Teacher

Steve Richardson (born December 23, 1954) is an American educator and politician.

Born in Des Moines, Iowa, Richardson graduated from Indianola high School in Indianola, Iowa in 1973. He received his bachelor's degree in history from Simpson College. He also took graduate work at University of Iowa and Northern Iowa University. He was a teacher and athletic director at the Woodward-Granger Schools. From 1990 to 1996 Richardson served on the Indianola City Council, and again from 2006 to 2010. From 1997 to 2002, Richardson served three terms in the Iowa House of Representatives as a Democrat.
