= Eastern Iowa Community Colleges =

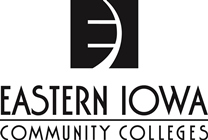
Eastern Iowa Community Colleges logo

The Eastern Iowa Community Colleges (EICC) includes three community colleges stretched along the Mississippi River in the U.S. state of Iowa. Eastern Iowa Community Colleges consists of the Iowa counties of Clinton, Muscatine, and Scott. The EICC administrative offices are in Davenport.

EICC is accredited by the Higher Learning Commission and the colleges are approved by the Iowa Department of Education and the Board of Regents. Individual programs are accredited by associations within their respective fields.

== History ==
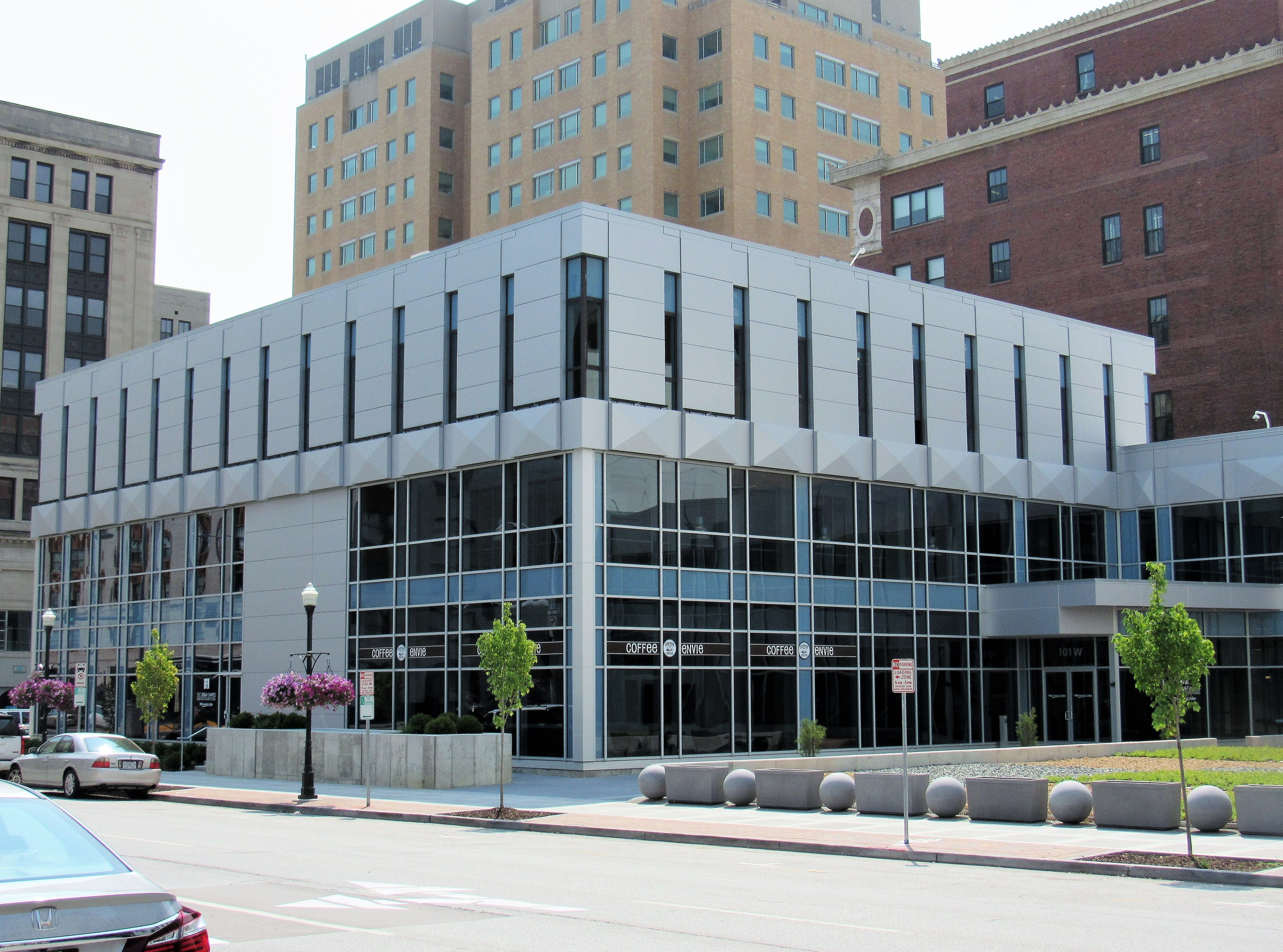
Location of the EICC administrative offices in Davenport

EICC was established in 1965 by the Iowa General Assembly as one of 15 community college merged areas. The move combined Clinton Junior College, Muscatine Junior College and the vocational-technical programs of the Davenport schools.

In 1979 the District acquired Palmer Junior College to make Scott Community College a comprehensive institution.

== Academics ==
EICC’s three colleges offer both college transfer and career technology programs. More than 8,000 students are enrolled in the colleges each semester. The colleges offer an online Associate in Arts Degree program in cooperation with the Iowa Community College Online Consortium. They also have formal transfer agreements with the state universities and area private colleges that make it easy to transfer once the student can earn their Associate in Arts Degree. They also offer the first two years of nearly any four-year degree if the student is interested in it. The colleges also offer more than 32 Career Credit programs with training delivered by instructors with personal experience in the field.

The colleges also deliver a wide range of worker training and re-training programs. These classes are delivered on both a credit and non-credit basis. In addition, area residents have the opportunity to take advantage of Continuing Education classes that allow them to pursue a particular interest or hobby. More than 40,000 students complete Business and Industry Center and Continuing Education classes each year.

== Campuses ==
The three campuses in the system are:

- Clinton Community College (CCC)
- Scott Community College (SCC)
- Muscatine Community College (MCC)

=== Satellite locations ===
In addition to its main campuses, EICC delivers classes through several satellite centers:

The Clinton Community College Technology Center in Clinton offers programs in graphic arts, web design, computer aided design/drafting and engineering technology.

The Blong Technology Center (BTC) and the Midwest Center for Public Safety Training (MCPST), both located near Interstate 80 in Davenport. The BTC offers specialized manufacturing technology programs and the MCPST provides advanced rescue and fire training.

The Advanced Technology Environmental Energy Center (ATEEC) in downtown Davenport is a national center promoting and supporting environmental technology education to address the needs of the national and global workforce

The Muscatine Industrial Technology Center on the Muscatine Community College campus also provides specialized manufacturing-related training.

The Columbus Junction, Muscatine, and Wilton Centers provide both college and adult education services for the members of those communities and their surrounding areas. Scott Community College's West Davenport Center provides adult and continuing education opportunities, and the college's urban campus in downtown Davenport offers college transfer classes as well as career programs in business, information technology, and administrative office support.

== Mascot ==
As of April 30, 2026, the mascot has been chosen as a river otter named Eddy.
