= 2024 Iowa Republican presidential caucuses =

- January 15, 2024

40 Republican National Convention delegates
- Turnout: 15% of registered Republicans in Iowa

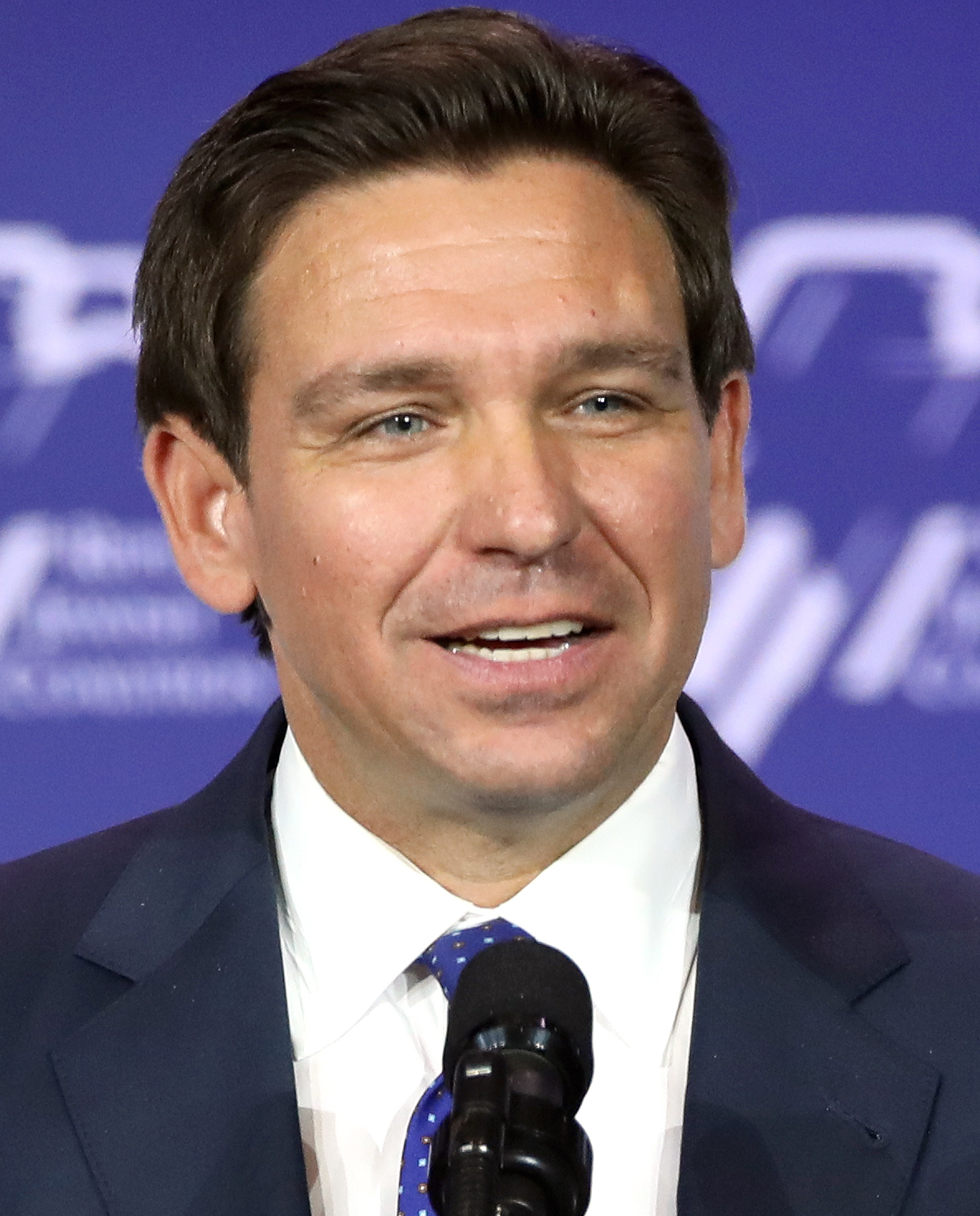

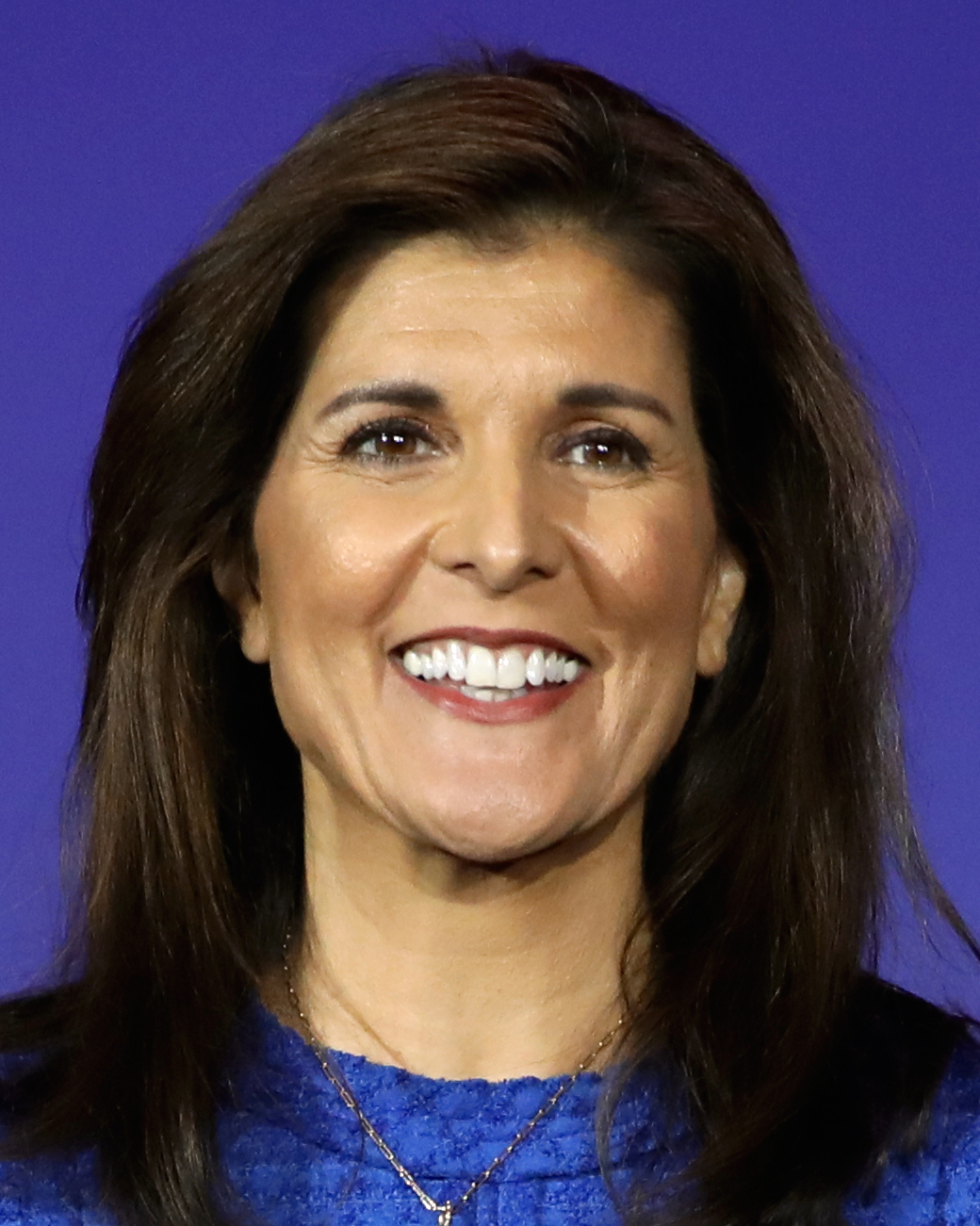

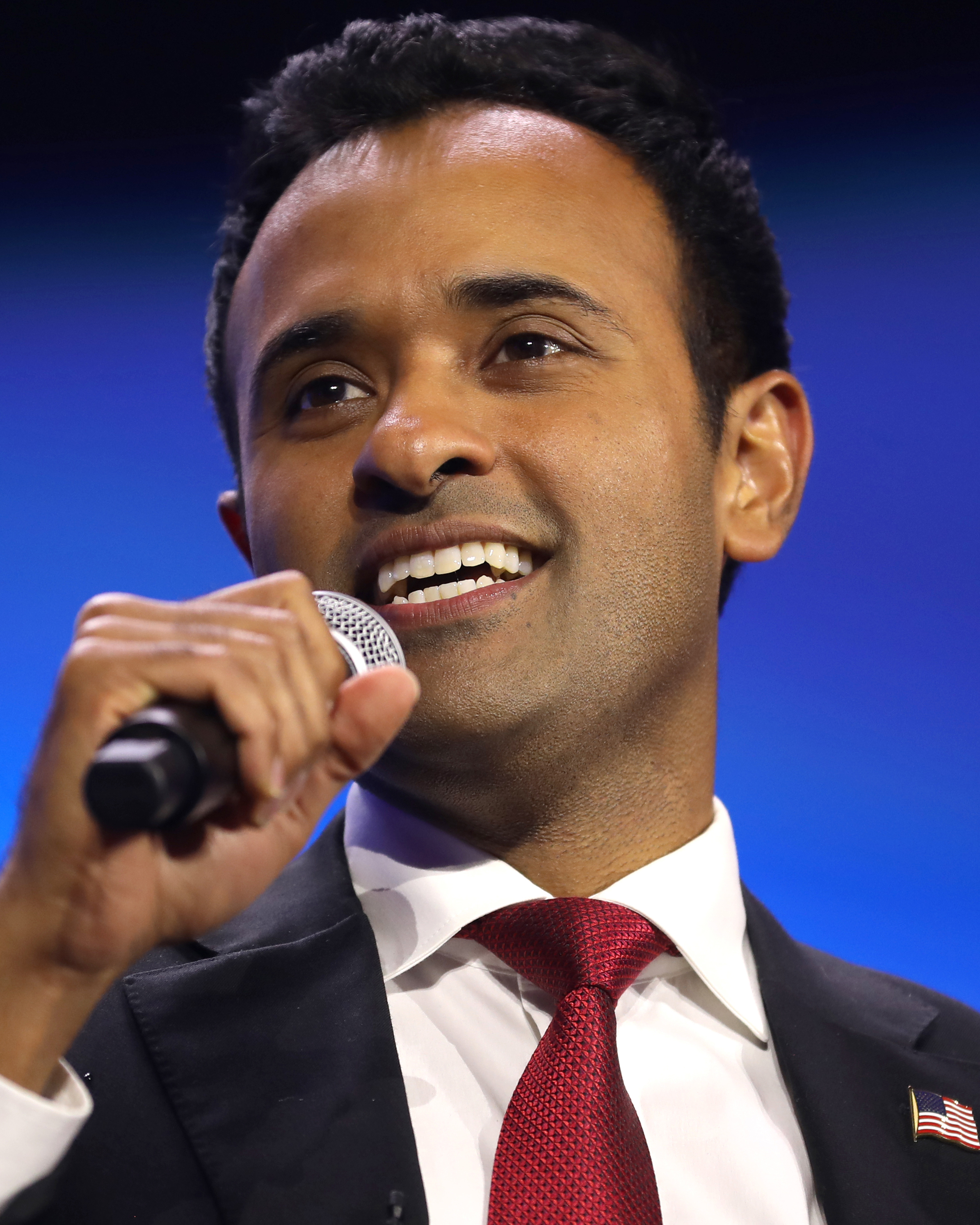
| Candidate | Donald Trump | Ron DeSantis |
| Home state | Florida | Florida |
| Delegate count | 20 | 9 |
| Popular vote | 56,243 | 23,491 |
| Percentage | 51.00% | 21.30% |
| Candidate | Nikki Haley | Vivek Ramaswamy |
| Home state | South Carolina | Ohio |
| Delegate count | 8 | 3 |
| Popular vote | 21,027 | 8,430 |
| Percentage | 19.07% | 7.64% |

Trump
30 – 40%
40 – 50%
50 – 60%
60 – 70%
70 – 80%
Haley
30 – 40%

The 2024 Iowa Republican presidential caucuses were held on January 15, 2024, as part of the Republican Party primaries for the 2024 presidential election. 40 delegates to the 2024 Republican National Convention were allocated on a proportional basis. As in past primary cycles, the Iowa caucuses were the first-in-the-nation Republican presidential nominating contest.

The results were a landslide victory for Donald Trump, with his 30-point margin being the largest margin of victory ever for a non-incumbent in the Iowa Republican caucuses. Trump won 20 delegates, Ron DeSantis won nine, Nikki Haley won eight, and Vivek Ramaswamy won three. Trump also became the first Republican ever to win a contested Iowa caucus with a majority of the vote, and the third person of either major political party to do so (the others being Tom Harkin in 1992, and Al Gore in 2000). Analysts described the results as establishing him as the Republican Party's presumptive nominee, with both DeSantis's and Haley's campaigns being seen as heavily damaged.

Trump also won 98 out of Iowa's 99 counties, losing Johnson County to Haley by a single vote. Ramaswamy announced the suspension of his campaign the night of the caucus, endorsing Trump, but retained his three delegates. Asa Hutchinson, who finished with less than 1% of the vote, dropped out the following day and endorsed Haley. DeSantis dropped out the following weekend and endorsed Trump.

== Background and electorate ==
=== History of the Iowa caucus ===
Beginning in 1972, the Iowa caucuses have been characterized as the first major electoral test for Republican presidential contenders. Despite its strategic importance, between 1976 and 2016, only three out of eight winners of the Iowa caucuses went on to receive the Republican presidential nomination.

=== Republican electorate ===
It has been argued that the Iowa Republican caucuses effectively serve as "referendums on who is the most socially conservative candidate" in the Republican field.

Commentators have noted in the 2010s the decisive role of Evangelical Christian caucusgoers in past contests. The victory of social conservatives George W. Bush, Mike Huckabee, Rick Santorum, and Ted Cruz in the 2000, 2008, 2012, and 2016 Iowa caucuses, respectively, was credited to their strong support among evangelical voters.

In 2016, it was noted by The Des Moines Register that almost half of likely Republican caucusgoers self-identify as evangelical or born-again Christians. In the 2016 Iowa Republican caucus, Senator Ted Cruz of Texas defeated eventual nominee Donald Trump by a 27.6% to 24.3% margin in what was considered an upset victory.

=== Procedure ===
Delegates are proportionally allocated to candidates based on the statewide vote. Unlike most states, there is no minimum threshold for a candidate to be eligible for delegates.

== Campaign developments ==
In February 2023, the Trump campaign announced its Iowa campaign staff, with state representative Bobby Kaufmann and consultant Eric Branstad, the son of former Governor Terry Branstad, serving as senior advisors. In March 2023, Trump's campaign announced that it would hold an "America First Education Policy" event in Davenport on March 13, marking his first official campaign appearance in the state.

Nikki Haley had held 22 events in Iowa by May 19, 2023. Her campaign made ad buys of $10 million in Iowa and New Hampshire beginning in December 2023. On December 8, Haley addressed a convention center conference where she stated her campaign had momentum and needed "to have a good showing in Iowa. I don’t think that means we have to win, necessarily, but I think that we have to have a good showing."

Governor of Florida Ron DeSantis held a pair of events in the state on March 10 and was accompanied by Governor Kim Reynolds. Reynolds remained neutral between Trump and DeSantis, which caused Trump to post on Truth Social accusing her of stealing the race from him and that like DeSantis, she would not have been elected without Trump's help. Reynolds broke her neutrality in November 2023 and endorsed DeSantis. Between October and December, DeSantis toured all 99 Iowan counties. In December, DeSantis' wife, Casey DeSantis, was widely criticized for calling on Republicans from other states to participate in the Iowa caucuses.

Asa Hutchinson focused most of his energy campaigning in the state, hoping to perform well and use that success as a springboard for the rest of his campaign.

== Endorsements ==
Ron DeSantis

Governors

- Kim Reynolds, Governor of Iowa (2017–present); Chairwoman of the Republican Governors Association (2022–2023); Lieutenant Governor of Iowa (2011–2017); Iowa State Senator from District 48 (2009–2011); Treasurer of Clarke County (1995–2009)

State senators

- Amy Sinclair, District 12 (2023–present) and District 14 (2013–2023); President (2023–present)
- Jack Whitver, District 23 (2023–present), District 19 (2013–2023), and District 35 (2011–2013); Majority Leader (2018–present)
- Dave Rowley, District 5 (2023–present) and District 1 (2022–2023)
- Mark Costello, District 8 (2023–present) and District 12 (2015–2023)
- Tom Shipley, District 9 (2023–present) and District 11 (2015–2023)
- Ken Rozenboom, District 19 (2023–present) and District 40 (2013–2023)
- Jesse Green, District 24 (2021–present)
- Dennis Guth, District 28 (2023–present) and District 4 (2013–2023)
- Waylon Brown, District 30 (2023–2024) and District 26 (2017–2023)
- Mike Klimesh, District 32 (2023–present) and District 28 (2021–2023); Mayor of Spillville (2008–2020)
- Dan Zumbach, District 34 (2023–present) and District 48 (2013–2023)
- Adrian Dickey, District 44 (2023–present) and District 41 (2021–2023)
- ~~Scott Webster, District 47 (2023–present)~~ (switched endorsement to Ramaswamy)
- Jeff Reichman, District 50 (2023–present) and District 42 (2021–2023) (previously endorsed Trump)

State representatives

- Matt Windschitl, District 15 (2023–present), District 17 (2013–2023), and District 56 (2007–2013); Majority Leader (2020–present)
- John Wills, District 10 (2023–present) and District 1 (2015–2023); Speaker Pro Tempore (2020–present)
- Robert Henderson, District 2 (2023–present)
- Skyler Wheeler, District 4 (2017–present)
- Ann Meyer, District 8 (2023–present) and District 9 (2019–2023)
- Henry Stone, District 9 (2023–present) and District 7 (2021–2023)
- Brian Best, District 11 (2023–present) and District 12 (2015–2023)
- ~~Steven Holt, District 12 (2023–present) and District 18 (2015–2023)~~ (switched endorsement to Ramaswamy)
- Ken Carlson, District 13 (2023–2025)
- David Sieck, District 16 (2023–present) and District 23 (2015–2023)
- Devon Wood, District 17 (2023–present)
- Tom Moore, District 18 (2023–present) and District 21 (2015–2023)
- Brent Siegrist, District 19 (2023–present), District 16 (2021–2023), District 84 (1993–2003), and District 99 (1985–1993)
- Hans Wilz, District 25 (2023–present)
- Jon Dunwell, District 38 (2023–present) and District 29 (2021–2023)
- Bill Gustoff, District 40 (2023–present)
- Dan Gehlbach, District 46 (2023–present)
- Carter Nordman, District 47 (2023–present) and District 19 (2021–2023)
- Phil Thompson, District 48 (2023–present) and District 47 (2019–2023)
- Dave Deyoe, District 51 (2023–present), District 49 (2013–2023), and District 10 (2007–2013)
- Dean Fisher, District 53 (2023–present) and District 72 (2013–2023)
- Tom Determann, District 69 (2023–present)
- Norlin Mommsen, District 70 (2023–present) and District 97 (2015–2023)
- Mike Vondran, District 94 (2023–present)
- Taylor Collins, District 95 (2023–present)

Notable individuals

- Bob Vander Plaats, political activist and president and CEO of The Family Leader
Nikki Haley

Former executive branch officials

- Mary Kramer, United States Ambassador to Barbados and the Eastern Caribbean (2004–2006)
- Mary Ann Hanusa, Director of the White House Office of Presidential Correspondence (2001–2006), Iowa State Representative of the 99th district (2011–2013) and the 16th district (2013–2021)

State senators

- Chris Cournoyer, District 35 (2019–2024)
- Bob Brunkhorst, District 7 (2002–2005)

State representatives

- Megan Jones, District 6 (2013–present)
- Jacob Bossman, District 14 (2018–present)
- Austin Harris, District 26 (2023–present)
- Brian Lohse, District 45 (2019–present)
- Shannon Latham, District 55 (2021–present)
- Jane Bloomingdale, District 60 (2017–present)
- Chad Ingels, District 68 (2021–present)
- Carmine Boal, District 70 (1999–2009)
- Dan Clute, District 59 (2007–2009)
- George Eichhorn, District 9 (2001–2007)
- Scott Raecker, District 63 (1999–2012)

Mayors

- Brett Barker, Nevada (2018–2025)
- Nelson Crabbe, Clear Lake (2006–present)
- Matt Walsh, Council Bluffs (2013–present)

Notable individuals

- Steve Lacy, CEO (2006-2019) and executive chairman (2009-2019) of Meredith Corporation
Asa Hutchinson

Newspapers

- Storm Lake Times
Vivek Ramaswamy

Former U.S. Representatives

- Steve King, IA-04 (2013–2021) and IA-05 (2003–2013)

State executive officials

- Roby Smith, State Treasurer (2023–present); Iowa State Senator from District 47 (2011–2023)

State senators

- Scott Webster, District 47 (2023–present) (previously endorsed DeSantis)
Donald Trump

Former Executive Branch officials

- Matthew Whitaker, Acting United States Attorney General (2018–2019)

Former U.S. Representatives

- Rod Blum, IA-01 (2015–2019)

State Executive officials

- Brenna Bird, Attorney General of Iowa (2023–present)

State senators

- Lynn Evans, District 3 (2023–present)
- Julian Garrett, District 11 (2023–present) and District 13 (2013–2023)
- Tim Kraayenbrink, District 4 (2023–present) and District 5 (2015–2023)
- Charlie McClintock, District 4 (2023–present)
- ~~Jeff Reichman, District 50 (2023–present) and District 42 (2021–2023)~~ (switched endorsement to DeSantis)
- Cherielynn Westrich, District 13 (2023–present)
- Brad Zaun, President pro tempore of the Iowa Senate (2021–2025) and 22nd district (2023–2025), the 20th district (2013–2023) and the 32nd district (2005–2013)

State representatives

- Brooke Boden, District 21 (2023–present) and District 26 (2021–2023)
- Steve Bradley, District 66 (2023–present) and District 58
- Mark Cisneros, District 96 (2023–present) and District 91 (2021–2023)
- Cindy Golding, District 83 (2023–present)
- Stan Gustafson, District 22 (2023–present) and District 25 (2014–2023)
- Heather Hora, District 92 (2023–present)
- Craig Johnson, District 67 (2023–present)
- Bobby Kaufmann, District 82 (2023–present) and District 73 (2013–2023)
- Shannon Lundgren, 65th district (2023–present) and the 57th district (2017–2023)
- Anne Osmundson, District 64 (2023–2025) and District 56 (2019–2023)
- Mike Sexton, 7th district (2023–present) and the 10th district (2015–2023)
- Brad Sherman, District 91 (2023–2025)
- Luana Stoltenberg, 81st district (2023–2025)
- Charley Thomson, 58th district (2023–present)
- Derek Wulf, District 76 (2023–present)

Notable individuals

- Eric Branstad, political consultant and son of former governor (1983–1999; 2011–2017) and U.S. ambassador to China (2017–2020) Terry Branstad
Declined to endorse

U.S. Senators

- Joni Ernst, (2015–present)
- Chuck Grassley, (1981–present)

U.S. Representatives

- Randy Feenstra, IA-04 (2021–present)
- Ashley Hinson, IA-01 (2021–2023), IA-02 (2023–present)
- Zach Nunn, IA-03 (2023–present)

Newspapers

- Quad-City Times

Endorsements by incumbent Republicans in the Iowa Senate.
Endorsed Ron DeSantis (13)
Endorsed Donald Trump (8)
Endorsed Nikki Haley (1)
Endorsed Vivek Ramaswamy (1)
No endorsement (11)

Endorsements by incumbent Republicans in the Iowa House of Representatives.
Endorsed Ron DeSantis (27)
Endorsed Donald Trump (15)
Endorsed Nikki Haley (7)
Endorsed Vivek Ramaswamy (1)
No endorsement (14)

== Polling ==
Local regression graph of all polls conducted since November 2022.

Aggregate polls

| Source of poll aggregation | Dates administered | Dates updated | Ron DeSantis | Nikki Haley | Asa Hutchinson | Vivek Ramaswamy | Donald Trump | Other/ Undecided (Note: Calculated by taking the difference of 100% and all other candidates combined.) | Margin |
|---|---|---|---|---|---|---|---|---|---|
| 270toWin | January 11–15, 2024 | January 15, 2024 | 15.7% | 18.5% | 0.8% | 6.8% | 52.5% | 5.7% (Note: Chris Christie 3.0% Ryan Binkley 1.5%) | Trump +34.0 |
| FiveThirtyEight | Through January 14, 2024 | January 15, 2024 | 15.8% | 18.7% | 0.7% | 6.4% | 52.7% | 5.7% | Trump +34.0 |
| RealClearPolling | January 5–14, 2024 | January 15, 2024 | 15.7% | 18.8% | 0.8% | 6.8% | 52.5% | 5.4% | Trump +33.7 |
| Average | | | 15.7% | 18.7% | 0.7% | 6.7% | 52.6% | 5.6% | Trump +33.9 |

| Poll source | Date(s) administered | Sample size (Note: Key: A – all adults RV – registered voters LV – likely voters V – unclear) | Margin of error | Doug Burgum | Chris Christie | Ron DeSantis | Larry Elder | Nikki Haley | Asa Hutchinson | Mike Pence | Vivek Ramaswamy | Tim Scott | Donald Trump | Other | Undecided |
|---|---|---|---|---|---|---|---|---|---|---|---|---|---|---|---|
| Trafalgar Group | Jan 12–14, 2024 | 1,092 (LV) | ± 2.9% | – | – | 19.3% | – | 18.5% | 0.7% | – | 6.5% | – | 52.1% | – | 2.9% |
| Selzer & Co. (Note: Poll sponsored by the Des Moines Register, NBC News & Mediacom Iowa) | Jan 7–12, 2024 | 705 (LV) | ± 3.7% | – | – | 16% | – | 20% | 1% | – | 8% | – | 48% | 3% (Note: Ryan Binkley with 1%; "None of these" with 2%) | 5% |
| Insider Advantage | January 11, 2024 | 850 (LV) | ± 4.3% | – | – | 17% | – | 17% | 0% | – | 7% | – | 51% | – | 8% |
| Suffolk University | Jan 6–10, 2024 | 500 (LV) | ± 4.4% | – | – | 13% | – | 20% | 0% | – | 6% | – | 54% | – | – |
| Civiqs | Jan 5–10, 2024 | 433 (LV) | ± 6.4% | – | 4% | 14% | – | 14% | 0% | – | 8% | – | 55% | 2% | 3% |
| InsiderAdvantage | Dec 18–19, 2023 | 850 (LV) | ± 4.36% | – | 4% | 15% | – | 17% | 0% | – | 8% | – | 50% | – | 6% |
| Fox Business | Dec 14–18, 2023 | 804 (LV) | ± 3.5% | – | 3% | 18% | – | 16% | 0% | – | 7% | – | 52% | 1% | 2% |
| Emerson College | Dec 15–17, 2023 | 420 (LV) | ± 4.7% | – | 4% | 15% | – | 17% | 0% | – | 8% | – | 50% | – | 6% |
| CBS News/YouGov | Dec 8–15, 2023 | 478 (LV) | – | – | 3% | 22% | – | 13% | 0% | – | 4% | – | 58% | – | – |
| Iowa State University/Civiqs | Dec 8–13, 2023 | 438 (LV) | ± 6.0% | – | 4% | 17% | – | 15% | 1% | – | 7% | – | 54% | 0% (Note: Ryan Binkley and David Stuckenberg with 0%) | 2% |
| Selzer & Co. | Dec 2–7, 2023 | 502 (LV) | ± 4.4% | – | 4% | 19% | – | 16% | 1% | – | 5% | – | 51% | 2% (Note: Ryan Binkley with 0%; "None of these" with 2%) | 3% |
| Trafalgar Group | Dec 1–4, 2023 | 1,091 (LV) | ± 2.9% | 2% | 4% | 22% | – | 19% | 1% | – | 5% | – | 45% | – | 1% |
| Morning Consult | Nov 1–30, 2023 | 324 (LV) | – | 1% | 2% | 18% | – | 11% | 0% | – | 13% | 5% | 50% | – | – |
| Iowa State University/Civiqs | Nov 10–15, 2023 | 432 (LV) | ± 4.3% | 1% | 3% | 18% | – | 12% | 0% | – | 6% | 2% | 54% | 0% | 4% |
| Arc Insights (Note: Poll sponsored by Fields of Freedom) | Nov 9–14, 2023 | 800 (LV) | ± 3.5% | 1% | 4% | 17% | – | 17% | <1% | – | 5% | – | 44% | 2% (Note: "Someone else" with 2%) | 9% |
| Fabrizio, Lee & Associates (Note: Poll sponsored by the Make America Great Again Inc. (Super Pac)) | Nov 9–12, 2023 | 600 (LV) | ± 4.0% | 1% | 5% | 19% | - | 16% | 0% | - | 4% | 5% | 43% | 0% | 7% |
| Fabrizio, Lee & Associates | Nov 9–12, 2023 | 600 (LV) | ± 4.0% | 2% | 5% | 20% | - | 18% | 0% | - | 5% | - | 44% | 0% | 7% |
| Trafalgar Group (R) | Nov 3–5, 2023 | 1,084 (LV) | ± 2.9% | 4% | 5% | 18% | – | 15% | 0% | – | 5% | 9% | 44% | 0% (Note: Ryan Binkley with 0%) | 1% |
| Morning Consult | Oct 1–31, 2023 | 324 (LV) | – | 1% | 2% | 15% | – | 7% | 0% | 3% | 9% | 6% | 57% | – | – |
| Public Opinion Strategies (Note: Poll sponsored by And To The Republic, a non-profit with ties to DeSantis) | Oct 24–26, 2023 | 400 (LV) | ± 4.9% | 1% | 2% | 20% | – | 12% | 1% | 1% | 4% | 5% | 46% | – | – |
| Selzer & Co. | Oct 22–26, 2023 | 404 (LV) | ± 4.9% | 3% | 4% | 16% | – | 16% | 1% | 2% (Note: The other percentages in this result were increased by redistributing Pence's supporters to their second-choice candidates in the poll) | 4% | 7% | 43% | 2% (Note: "Someone else" with 2%; Ryan Binkley with 0%) | 3% |
| Fabrizio, Lee & Associates | Oct 17–19, 2023 | 600 (LV) | ± 4.0% | 2% | 3% | 21% | 0% | 14% | 0% | 2% | 4% | 5% | 42% | 2% (Note: Perry Johnson with 1%) | 6% |
| Iowa State University/Civiqs | Oct 6–10, 2023 | 425 (LV) | ± 6.1% | 0% | 2% | 17% | 0% | 11% | 0% | 1% | 5% | 4% | 55% | 2% (Note: Ryan Binkley with 2%; Will Hurd and Perry Johnson with 0%) | 1% |
| Morning Consult | Sep 1–30, 2023 | 316 (LV) | – | 1% | 5% | 13% | – | 6% | – | 7% | 9% | 7% | 53% | – | – |
| CBS News/YouGov | Sep 15–24, 2023 | 458 (LV) | ± 6.1% | 0% | 1% | 21% | 0% | 8% | 1% | 6% | 5% | 6% | 51% | 0% (Note: Will Hurd with 0%) | – |
| Public Opinion Strategies (Note: Poll sponsored by Citizens Awareness Project) | Sep 19–21, 2023 | 400 (LV) | ± 4.9% | 1% | 2% | 21% | – | 9% | 0% | 2% | 5% | 6% | 45% | – | 9% |
| Fabrizio, Lee & Associates (Note: Poll sponsored by Make America Great Again Inc. super PAC, which supports Trump) | Sep 17–19, 2023 | 500 (LV) | ± 4.4% | 1% | 5% | 15% | – | 13% | <1% | 2% | 5% | 5% | 45% | <1% (Note: Perry Johnson & Will Hurd with <1%) | 7% |
| Trafalgar Group (R) | Sep 14–18, 2023 | 1,079 (LV) | ± 2.9% | 4% | 2% | 16% | 0% | 8% | 0% | 4% | 7% | 7% | 49% | 1% (Note: Perry Johnson with 1%; Ryan Binkley with and Will Hurd with 0%) | 2% |
| Fox Business | Sep 14–18, 2023 | 813 (LV) | ± 3% | 2% | 3% | 15% | <0.5% | 11% | <0.5% | 3% | 7% | 7% | 46% | 3% (Note: Ryan Binkley, Perry Johnson and "Other" with 1%; Asa Hutchinson and "None of the above" with <0.5%) | 2% |
| Emerson College | Sep 7–9, 2023 | 357 (V) | ± 5.1% | 3% | – | 14% | – | 7% | – | 3% | 7% | 8% | 49% | 6% | – |
| Civiqs | Sep 2–7, 2023 | 434 (LV) | ± 5.8% | 2% | 3% | 14% | – | 10% | 0% | 1% | 9% | 6% | 51% | 1% (Note: Ryan Binkley with 1% and Will Hurd with 0%) | – |
| Public Opinion Strategies | Sep 5–6, 2023 | 400 (LV) | ± 4.9% | 1% | 3% | 22% | – | 6% | 1% | 2% | 6% | 5% | 45% | – | – |
| Morning Consult | Aug 1–31, 2023 | 341 (LV) | – | 1% | 4% | 15% | – | 6% | 0% | 6% | 8% | 7% | 52% | 0% (Note: Francis Suarez with 0%) | 1% |
| Fabrizio, Lee & Associates | Aug 25–28, 2023 | 500 (LV) | – | 2% | 3% | 18% | <1% | 10% | 1% | 2% | 7% | 7% | 44% | <2% (Note: Perry Johnson and Will Hurd with <1%; Francis Suarez with 0%) | 5% |
| Public Opinion Strategies | August 24, 2023 | 400 (LV) | ± 4.9% | 1% | 1% | 21% | – | 11% | 1% | 2% | 7% | 7% | 41% | – | – |
| Public Opinion Strategies | Aug 19–21, 2023 | 400 (LV) | ± 4.9% | 3% | 3% | 14% | – | 3% | <1% | 2% | 10% | 3% | 42% | – | – |
| HarrisX (Note: Poll sponsored by American Free Enterprise Chamber of Commerce) | Aug 17–21, 2023 | 1,120 (LV) | – (Note: Standard VI response) | 2% | 3% | 11% | 0% | 4% | 0% | 3% | 9% | 8% | 45% | 3% (Note: "Someone else" with 2%; Ryan Binkley with 1%; Will Hurd, Perry Johnson, Corey Stapleton and Francis Suarez with 0%) | 12% |
| HarrisX | Aug 17–21, 2023 | 1,120 (LV) | – (Note: If Trump did not run in the caucuses) | 2% | 4% | 21% | 1% | 6% | 1% | 8% | 18% | 15% | – | 4% (Note: "Someone else" with 3%; Ryan Binkley with 1%; Will Hurd, Perry Johnson, Corey Stapleton and Francis Suarez with 0%) | 19% |
| Echelon Insights (Note: Poll commissioned by Republican Main Street Partnership) | Aug 15–17, 2023 | 800 (LV) | ± 4.2% | 2% | 4% | 17% | – | 2% | <1% | 3% | 8% | 3% | 33% | 3% (Note: "Someone else" with 2%; Will Hurd with 1%; Ryan Binkley and Francis Suarez with <1%) | 14% |
| Selzer & Co. | Aug 13–17, 2023 | 406 (LV) | ± 4.9% | 2% | 5% | 19% | – | 6% | – | 6% | 4% | 9% | 42% | 1% (Note: Will Hurd with 1%) | 5% |
| The Trafalgar Group (R) | Aug 14–16, 2023 | 1,126 (LV) | ± 2.9% | 3% | 4% | 16% | 1% | 5% | 1% | 4% | 6% | 13% | 42% | 3% (Note: Ryan Binkley and Perry Johnson with 1%; Will Hurd and Francis Suarez with 0%) | 3% |
| New York Times/Siena College | Jul 28 – August 1, 2023 | 432 (LV) | ± 5.9% | 1% | <1% | 20% | <1% | 4% | <1% | 3% | 5% | 9% | 44% | <2% (Note: "Someone else" with <1%; Will Hurd with <1%; Francis Suarez with 0%) | 12% |
| New York Times/Siena College | Jul 28 – August 1, 2023 | 432 (LV) | ± 5.9% | – | – | 39% | – | – | – | – | – | – | 55% | – | 4% |
| Manhattan Institute | Jul 2023 | 625 (LV) | – | 3% | 4% | 17% | 0% | 5% | 1% | 4% | 6% | 10% | 42% | 1% (Note: "Someone else" with 1%; Francis Suarez with 0%) | 7% |
| Morning Consult | July 1–31, 2023 | 350 (LV) | – | 1% | 2% | 19% | – | 4% | 0% | 4% | 8% | 5% | 55% | – | 2% |
| National Research (Note: Poll sponsored by American Greatness, which supports Trump) | Jul 23–24, 2023 | 500 (LV) | ± 4.4% | 3% | 4% | 15% | – | 3% | 0% | 2% | 5% | 9% | 42% | – | 13% |
| Fox Business | Jul 15–19, 2023 | 806 (LV) | ± 3.5% | 3% | 3% | 16% | <1% | 5% | 1% | 4% | 6% | 11% | 46% | 1% (Note: Franciz Suarez at 1%; Will Hurd at less than 1%) | 4% |
| co/efficient (Note: Poll sponsored by Trump campaign) | Jul 15–17, 2023 | 2,238 (LV) | ± 2.6% | – | 3% | 16% | – | 3% | – | 3% | 5% | 10% | 46% | – | 10% |
| National Research | Jul 5–6, 2023 | 500 (LV) | ± 4.4% | – | 3% | 21% | – | 2% | 1% | 3% | 3% | 7% | 44% | – | 14% |
| Morning Consult | June 1–30, 2023 | 317 (LV) | – | 0% | 1% | 18% | – | 2% | 1% | 7% | 3% | 3% | 64% | 0% (Note: Francis Saurez with 0%) | 1% |
| McLaughlin & Associates | Jun 10–12, 2023 | 500 (LV) | ± 4.4% | – | – | 19% | – | – | – | 6% | – | 9% | 51% | – | 15% |
| McLaughlin & Associates | Jun 10–12, 2023 | 500 (LV) | ± 4.4% | – | – | 33% | – | – | – | – | – | – | 60% | – | 7% |
| National Research | Jun 5–7, 2023 | 500 (LV) | ± 4.4% | – | 2% | 24% | – | 4% | 0% | 4% | 1% | 5% | 39% | – | 21% |
| Victory Insights | Jun 3–6, 2023 | 450 (LV) | ± 4.9% | – | 3% | 21% | – | 5% | – | 5% | 2% | 6% | 44% | 3% (Note: Someone else with 3%) | 12% |
| Victory Insights | Jun 3–6, 2023 | 450 (LV) | ± 4.9% | – | – | 32% | – | – | – | – | – | – | 49% | – | 19% |
| WPA Intelligence (Note: Poll sponsored by Never Back Down PAC, which supports DeSantis.) | May 30 – June 1, 2023 | 655 (RV) | – | – | – | 29% | – | 6% | <1% | 4% | 4% | 7% | 39% | – | 11% |
| WPA Intelligence | May 30 – June 1, 2023 | 655 (RV) | – | – | – | 43% | – | – | – | – | – | – | 45% | – | 12% |
| Morning Consult | May 1–31, 2023 | 300 (LV) | – | – | – | 17% | – | 5% | 0% | 8% | 5% | 1% | 60% | 4% (Note: Greg Abbott with 2%; Liz Cheney and Kristi Noem with 1%) | 0% |
| McLaughlin & Associates | May 23–25, 2023 | 400 (LV) | – | 0% | 1% | 24% | 1% | 4% | 1% | 5% | 2% | 7% | 50% | 3% (Note: Mitt Romney with 3%; Rick Perry, Chris Sununu, Perry Johnson, Francis Suarez with 0%) | 4% |
| McLaughlin & Associates | May 23–25, 2023 | 400 (LV) | – | – | – | 36% | – | – | – | – | – | – | 54% | – | 11% |
| Emerson College | May 19–22, 2023 | 600 (LV) | ± 3.9% | 0% | – | 20% | – | 5% | 1% | 5% | 2% | 3% | 62% | 2% (Note: Someone else with 2%) | – |
| National Research | May 9–11, 2023 | 500 (LV) | ± 4.4% | – | – | 26% | – | 6% | 1% | 4% | 3% | 1% | 44% | – | 11% |
| National Research | May 9–11, 2023 | 500 (LV) | ± 4.4% | – | – | 33% | – | – | – | – | – | – | 45% | – | 22% |
| McLaughlin & Associates | Apr 27–30, 2023 | 500 (LV) | ± 4.4% | – | 1% | 20% | 1% | 5% | 0% | 7% | 2% | 1% | 54% | 5% (Note: Mitt Romney with 4%, Liz Cheney with 1%, Chris Sununu, John Bolton and Glenn Youngkin with 0%) | 5% |
| McLaughlin & Associates | Apr 27–30, 2023 | 500 (LV) | ± 4.4% | – | – | 22% | – | – | – | – | – | – | 57% | – | – |
| Morning Consult | Apr 1–30, 2023 | 294 (LV) | – | – | – | 20% | – | 4% | 0% | 7% | 4% | 0% | 60% | 3% (Note: Greg Abbott, Liz Cheney and Kristi Noem with 1%; Greg Abbott, Mike Pompeo with 0%) | 2% |
| Victory Insights | Apr 10–13, 2023 | 400 (LV) | ± 4.8% | – | – | 24% | – | 14% | 4% | – | 3% | – | 54% | 1% (Note: Perry Johnson with 1%) | – |
| Victory Insights | Apr 10–13, 2023 | 400 (LV) | ± 4.8% | – | – | 59% | – | 24% | 5% | – | 8% | – | – | 4% (Note: Perry Johnson with 4%) | – |
| Victory Insights | Apr 10–13, 2023 | 400 (LV) | ± 4.8% | – | – | 41% | – | – | – | – | – | – | 59% | – | – |
| Cygnal | Apr 3–4, 2023 | 600 (LV) | ± 3.9% | – | – | 30% | – | 5% | 1% | 2% | 2% | 1% | 37% | 3% (Note: Kristi Noem with 2%; Mike Pompeo with 1%) | 19% |
| J.L. Partners | Mar 25 – April 4, 2023 | 628 (LV) | ± 3.9% | – | – | 26% | – | 5% | – | 3% | 1% | – | 41% | 10% (Note: Mike Pompeo with 3%; Glenn Youngkin with 1%; "Someone else" with 6%) | 14% |
| J.L. Partners | Mar 25 – April 4, 2023 | 628 (LV) | ± 3.9% | – | – | 39% | – | – | – | – | – | – | 47% | – | 15% |
| Morning Consult | Mar 1–31, 2023 | 329 (LV) | – | – | – | 27% | – | 5% | – | 7% | – | 0% | 57% | 2% (Note: Kristi Noem and Mike Pompeo with 1%; Greg Abbott, Liz Cheney and Glenn Youngkin with 0%) | 2% |
| Morning Consult | Feb 1–28, 2023 | 281 (LV) | – | – | – | 25% | – | 6% | – | 9% | 0% | 0% | 52% | 8% (Note: Liz Cheney and Ted Cruz with 3%; Kristi Noem and Mike Pompeo with 1%) | 0% |
| Morning Consult | Jan 1–31, 2023 | 367 (LV) | – | – | – | 27% | – | 5% | – | 9% | – | 1% | 51% | 5% (Note: Ted Cruz with 3%; Greg Abbott, Kristi Noem and Mike Pompeo with 1%, Liz Cheney with 0%) | 2% |
| Morning Consult | Dec 1–31, 2022 | 227 (LV) | – | – | – | 35% | – | 2% | – | 11% | – | 1% | 44% | 8% (Note: Kristi Noem with 3%; Ted Cruz with 2%; Greg Abbott, Liz Cheney and Mike Pompeo with 1%, Glenn Youngkin with 0%) | 0% |
| WPA Intelligence (Note: Poll sponsored by Club for Growth) | Nov 11–13, 2022 | 508 (LV) | ± 4.4% | – | – | 48% | – | – | – | – | – | – | 37% | – | 16% |
| WPA Intelligence | Aug 7–10, 2022 | 508 (LV) | ± 4.4% | – | – | 37% | – | – | – | – | – | – | 52% | – | 12% |
| Neighborhood Research and Media (Note: Poll sponsored by Courageous Conservatives PAC) | Jun 22 – July 1, 2022 | 546 (LV) | ± 4.2% | – | – | 17% | – | 2% | – | 2% | – | – | 38% | 4% (Note: Kim Reynolds, Kristi Noem, Ted Cruz, and Marco Rubio with 1%) | – |
| Victory Insights | Mar 5–8, 2021 | 630 (RV) | – | – | – | 4% | – | 6% | – | 8% | – | – | 61% | 13% (Note: Mitt Romney with 5%; Ted Cruz with 4%; Kristi Noem and Mike Pompeo with 2%) | – |
| Victory Insights | Mar 5–8, 2021 | 630 (RV) | – | – | – | 20% | – | 10% | – | 19% | – | – | – | 33% (Note: Ted Cruz with 16%; Mitt Romney with 5%; Kristi Noem and Mike Pompeo with 6%) | – |

== Results ==
Each candidate's vote share and 1st/2nd-place finisher in each county

Just minutes after the caucus events started at 7 pm local time, Trump was projected to win the most votes by the Associated Press. Trump received 20 delegates, DeSantis nine, Haley eight, and Ramaswamy three. Barring any shifts in votes after the conclusion of the Iowa Republican Party's ongoing recanvass of the caucus results, Trump won all of Iowa's counties except for Johnson County, which he lost to Haley by one vote.

DeSantis and Haley finished second and third place respectively. Ramaswamy, who placed fourth, announced the suspension of his campaign the night of the caucus, endorsing Trump, but will retain his three expected delegates. Hutchinson announced the suspension of his campaign the day after the caucus. DeSantis, despite finishing in second place, announced the suspension of his campaign six days after the caucus.

The DeSantis campaign was highly critical of "media outlets" calling the results before the caucuses had closed.

According to The Des Moines Register, as well as The Hill the turnout was reduced compared to the previous caucuses in 2020, due to the colder than normal weather.

Iowa Republican precinct caucuses, January 15, 2024
| Candidate | Votes | Percentage | Actual delegate count | | |
| Candidate | Votes | Percentage | Bound | Unbound | Total |
|---|---|---|---|---|---|
| Donald Trump | 56,243 | 51.00% | 20 | 0 | 20 |
| Ron DeSantis | 23,491 | 21.30% | 9 | 0 | 9 |
| Nikki Haley | 21,027 | 19.07% | 8 | 0 | 8 |
| Vivek Ramaswamy | 8,430 | 7.64% | 3 | 0 | 3 |
| Ryan Binkley | 768 | 0.70% | 0 | 0 | 0 |
| Asa Hutchinson | 188 | 0.17% | 0 | 0 | 0 |
| Other | 90 | 0.08% | 0 | 0 | 0 |
| Chris Christie (withdrawn) | 35 | 0.03% | 0 | 0 | 0 |
| Total: | 110,272 | 100.00% | 40 | 0 | 40 |

By county

| County | Donald Trump | | Ron DeSantis | | Nikki Haley | | Vivek Ramaswamy | | Others | | Margin | | Total votes |
| County | % | # | % | # | % | # | % | # | % | # | % | # | Total votes |
|---|---|---|---|---|---|---|---|---|---|---|---|---|---|
| Adair | 50.63% | 120 | 28.27% | 67 | 8.86% | 21 | 12.24% | 29 | 0.00% | 0 | 22.36% | 53 | 237 |
| Adams | 58.70% | 108 | 18.48% | 34 | 14.13% | 26 | 8.15% | 15 | 0.54% | 1 | 40.22% | 74 | 185 |
| Allamakee | 66.86% | 353 | 15.53% | 82 | 10.61% | 56 | 4.55% | 24 | 2.46% | 13 | 51.33% | 271 | 528 |
| Appanoose | 71.87% | 373 | 11.95% | 62 | 6.94% | 36 | 8.48% | 44 | 0.77% | 4 | 59.92% | 311 | 519 |
| Audubon | 64.26% | 178 | 15.88% | 44 | 10.11% | 28 | 9.39% | 26 | 0.36% | 1 | 48.38% | 134 | 277 |
| Benton | 59.60% | 652 | 21.85% | 239 | 9.60% | 105 | 8.59% | 94 | 0.37% | 4 | 37.75% | 413 | 1,094 |
| Black Hawk | 52.23% | 1,782 | 16.03% | 547 | 21.98% | 750 | 9.03% | 308 | 0.73% | 25 | 30.25% | 1,032 | 3,412 |
| Boone | 46.46% | 505 | 27.69% | 301 | 16.01% | 174 | 7.73% | 84 | 2.12% | 23 | 18.77% | 204 | 1,087 |
| Bremer | 46.59% | 437 | 18.55% | 174 | 23.13% | 217 | 11.19% | 105 | 0.53% | 5 | 23.45% | 220 | 938 |
| Buchanan | 63.32% | 423 | 15.42% | 103 | 9.13% | 61 | 10.48% | 70 | 1.65% | 11 | 47.90% | 320 | 668 |
| Buena Vista | 61.87% | 357 | 14.56% | 84 | 14.56% | 84 | 7.63% | 44 | 1.39% | 8 | 47.31% | 273 | 577 |
| Butler | 58.47% | 352 | 16.28% | 98 | 12.96% | 78 | 10.30% | 62 | 1.99% | 12 | 42.19% | 254 | 602 |
| Calhoun | 62.87% | 210 | 15.87% | 53 | 11.98% | 40 | 7.78% | 26 | 1.50% | 5 | 47.01% | 157 | 334 |
| Carroll | 53.30% | 355 | 20.42% | 136 | 19.37% | 129 | 5.56% | 37 | 1.35% | 9 | 32.88% | 219 | 666 |
| Cass | 61.68% | 375 | 17.93% | 109 | 17.27% | 105 | 2.63% | 16 | 0.49% | 3 | 43.75% | 266 | 608 |
| Cedar | 60.19% | 378 | 15.61% | 98 | 15.61% | 98 | 7.96% | 50 | 0.64% | 4 | 44.59% | 280 | 628 |
| Cerro Gordo | 59.56% | 941 | 14.87% | 235 | 17.78% | 281 | 6.14% | 97 | 1.65% | 26 | 41.77% | 660 | 1,580 |
| Cherokee | 58.30% | 337 | 17.13% | 99 | 14.88% | 86 | 8.65% | 50 | 1.04% | 6 | 41.17% | 238 | 578 |
| Chickasaw | 58.43% | 253 | 17.32% | 75 | 13.86% | 60 | 9.47% | 41 | 0.92% | 4 | 41.11% | 178 | 433 |
| Clarke | 63.90% | 246 | 14.55% | 56 | 12.99% | 50 | 5.71% | 22 | 2.86% | 11 | 49.35% | 190 | 385 |
| Clay | 59.09% | 390 | 18.18% | 120 | 13.48% | 89 | 8.03% | 53 | 1.21% | 8 | 40.91% | 270 | 660 |
| Clayton | 63.79% | 428 | 18.63% | 125 | 7.60% | 51 | 7.60% | 51 | 2.38% | 16 | 45.16% | 303 | 671 |
| Clinton | 69.83% | 1,139 | 11.47% | 187 | 12.75% | 208 | 5.95% | 97 | 0.00% | 0 | 57.08% | 931 | 1,631 |
| Crawford | 52.47% | 202 | 9.61% | 37 | 12.47% | 48 | 23.90% | 92 | 1.56% | 6 | 28.57% | 110 | 385 |
| Dallas | 38.95% | 1,978 | 25.03% | 1,271 | 26.60% | 1,351 | 8.65% | 439 | 0.77% | 39 | 12.35% | 627 | 5,078 |
| Davis | 67.30% | 177 | 16.35% | 43 | 10.65% | 28 | 4.56% | 12 | 1.14% | 3 | 50.95% | 134 | 263 |
| Decatur | 60.71% | 153 | 19.05% | 48 | 13.89% | 35 | 5.95% | 15 | 0.40% | 1 | 41.67% | 105 | 252 |
| Delaware | 55.62% | 292 | 18.29% | 96 | 16.19% | 85 | 8.95% | 47 | 0.95% | 5 | 37.33% | 196 | 525 |
| Des Moines | 59.68% | 786 | 21.49% | 283 | 11.85% | 156 | 6.68% | 88 | 0.30% | 4 | 38.19% | 503 | 1,317 |
| Dickinson | 52.00% | 429 | 20.97% | 173 | 15.15% | 125 | 10.91% | 90 | 0.97% | 8 | 31.03% | 256 | 825 |
| Dubuque | 47.74% | 1,244 | 23.37% | 609 | 19.53% | 509 | 9.13% | 238 | 0.23% | 6 | 24.37% | 635 | 2,606 |
| Emmet | 67.94% | 195 | 14.63% | 42 | 6.97% | 20 | 9.41% | 27 | 1.05% | 3 | 53.31% | 153 | 287 |
| Fayette | 56.70% | 368 | 16.33% | 106 | 17.87% | 116 | 7.24% | 47 | 1.85% | 12 | 38.83% | 252 | 649 |
| Floyd | 66.41% | 346 | 17.08% | 89 | 10.56% | 55 | 4.61% | 24 | 1.34% | 7 | 49.33% | 257 | 521 |
| Franklin | 54.25% | 217 | 20.00% | 80 | 15.25% | 61 | 7.75% | 31 | 2.75% | 11 | 34.25% | 137 | 400 |
| Fremont | 68.33% | 164 | 12.08% | 29 | 15.00% | 36 | 4.58% | 11 | 0.00% | 0 | 53.33% | 128 | 240 |
| Greene | 56.33% | 209 | 18.33% | 68 | 16.44% | 61 | 6.74% | 25 | 2.16% | 8 | 38.01% | 141 | 371 |
| Grundy | 51.68% | 292 | 20.35% | 115 | 15.04% | 85 | 11.86% | 67 | 1.06% | 6 | 31.33% | 177 | 565 |
| Guthrie | 55.58% | 264 | 17.47% | 83 | 18.53% | 88 | 8.00% | 38 | 0.42% | 2 | 37.05% | 176 | 475 |
| Hamilton | 56.90% | 334 | 20.61% | 121 | 14.48% | 85 | 7.16% | 42 | 0.85% | 5 | 36.29% | 213 | 587 |
| Hancock | 65.44% | 337 | 17.67% | 91 | 8.93% | 46 | 6.21% | 32 | 1.75% | 9 | 47.77% | 246 | 515 |
| Hardin | 50.97% | 368 | 23.41% | 169 | 12.33% | 89 | 10.80% | 78 | 2.49% | 18 | 27.56% | 199 | 722 |
| Harrison | 66.56% | 428 | 13.53% | 87 | 11.82% | 76 | 7.31% | 47 | 0.78% | 5 | 53.03% | 341 | 643 |
| Henry | 64.88% | 436 | 18.30% | 123 | 12.20% | 82 | 4.02% | 27 | 0.60% | 4 | 46.58% | 313 | 672 |
| Howard | 63.79% | 222 | 10.06% | 35 | 16.95% | 59 | 8.62% | 30 | 0.57% | 2 | 46.84% | 163 | 348 |
| Humboldt | 70.65% | 313 | 11.06% | 49 | 8.80% | 39 | 9.03% | 40 | 0.45% | 2 | 59.59% | 264 | 443 |
| Ida | 51.16% | 132 | 15.89% | 41 | 21.32% | 55 | 9.30% | 24 | 2.33% | 6 | 29.84% | 77 | 258 |
| Iowa | 55.21% | 360 | 22.39% | 146 | 15.18% | 99 | 6.29% | 41 | 0.92% | 6 | 32.82% | 214 | 652 |
| Jackson | 71.97% | 498 | 9.83% | 68 | 10.84% | 75 | 7.37% | 51 | 0.00% | 0 | 61.13% | 423 | 692 |
| Jasper | 54.62% | 751 | 22.84% | 314 | 13.02% | 179 | 7.85% | 108 | 1.67% | 23 | 31.78% | 437 | 1,375 |
| Jefferson | 69.52% | 301 | 12.01% | 52 | 9.24% | 40 | 8.55% | 37 | 0.69% | 3 | 57.51% | 249 | 433 |
| Johnson | 35.49% | 1,270 | 21.10% | 755 | 35.52% | 1,271 | 7.15% | 256 | 0.73% | 26 | -0.03% | -1 | 3,578 |
| Jones | 55.91% | 426 | 19.16% | 146 | 14.83% | 113 | 9.19% | 70 | 0.92% | 7 | 36.75% | 280 | 762 |
| Keokuk | 74.61% | 285 | 12.83% | 49 | 7.59% | 29 | 4.45% | 17 | 0.52% | 2 | 61.78% | 236 | 382 |
| Kossuth | 66.87% | 430 | 15.86% | 102 | 9.02% | 58 | 7.93% | 51 | 0.31% | 2 | 51.01% | 328 | 643 |
| Lee | 65.79% | 550 | 16.27% | 136 | 8.97% | 75 | 6.82% | 57 | 2.15% | 18 | 49.52% | 414 | 836 |
| Linn | 42.75% | 2,992 | 23.59% | 1,651 | 24.80% | 1,736 | 8.07% | 565 | 0.79% | 55 | 17.95% | 1,256 | 6,999 |
| Louisa | 70.65% | 219 | 17.74% | 55 | 8.71% | 27 | 2.90% | 9 | 0.00% | 0 | 52.90% | 164 | 310 |
| Lucas | 66.46% | 218 | 14.33% | 47 | 6.40% | 21 | 11.59% | 38 | 1.22% | 4 | 52.13% | 171 | 328 |
| Lyon | 58.73% | 427 | 28.20% | 205 | 7.43% | 54 | 5.36% | 39 | 0.28% | 2 | 30.54% | 222 | 727 |
| Madison | 57.10% | 430 | 19.79% | 149 | 14.74% | 111 | 7.84% | 59 | 0.53% | 4 | 37.32% | 281 | 753 |
| Mahaska | 52.75% | 499 | 28.96% | 274 | 9.41% | 89 | 7.29% | 69 | 1.59% | 15 | 23.78% | 225 | 946 |
| Marion | 46.08% | 700 | 28.97% | 440 | 17.18% | 261 | 6.78% | 103 | 0.99% | 15 | 17.12% | 260 | 1,519 |
| Marshall | 52.68% | 649 | 24.19% | 298 | 14.53% | 179 | 7.06% | 87 | 1.54% | 19 | 28.49% | 351 | 1,232 |
| Mills | 59.00% | 449 | 20.24% | 154 | 16.56% | 126 | 3.94% | 30 | 0.26% | 2 | 38.76% | 295 | 761 |
| Mitchell | 49.86% | 178 | 20.45% | 73 | 15.41% | 55 | 14.01% | 50 | 0.28% | 1 | 29.41% | 105 | 357 |
| Monona | 70.18% | 200 | 15.44% | 44 | 7.72% | 22 | 6.67% | 19 | 0.00% | 0 | 54.74% | 156 | 285 |
| Monroe | 66.67% | 162 | 14.81% | 36 | 9.05% | 22 | 7.00% | 17 | 2.47% | 6 | 51.85% | 126 | 243 |
| Montgomery | 57.28% | 177 | 9.71% | 30 | 22.01% | 68 | 8.74% | 27 | 2.27% | 7 | 35.28% | 109 | 309 |
| Muscatine | 53.74% | 582 | 18.10% | 196 | 20.22% | 219 | 7.76% | 84 | 0.18% | 2 | 33.52% | 363 | 1,083 |
| O'Brien | 62.91% | 329 | 17.40% | 91 | 8.80% | 46 | 7.07% | 37 | 3.82% | 20 | 45.51% | 238 | 523 |
| Osceola | 64.36% | 121 | 15.96% | 30 | 12.23% | 23 | 6.38% | 12 | 1.06% | 2 | 48.40% | 91 | 188 |
| Page | 63.94% | 328 | 15.40% | 79 | 15.59% | 80 | 3.90% | 20 | 1.17% | 6 | 48.34% | 248 | 513 |
| Palo Alto | 56.63% | 188 | 21.39% | 71 | 12.05% | 40 | 9.64% | 32 | 0.30% | 1 | 35.24% | 117 | 332 |
| Plymouth | 63.97% | 712 | 17.61% | 196 | 11.41% | 127 | 6.29% | 70 | 0.72% | 8 | 46.36% | 516 | 1,113 |
| Pocahontas | 67.11% | 255 | 10.26% | 39 | 11.32% | 43 | 11.05% | 42 | 0.26% | 1 | 55.79% | 212 | 380 |
| Polk | 38.03% | 6,629 | 27.20% | 4,742 | 26.36% | 4,595 | 7.50% | 1,308 | 0.91% | 159 | 10.82% | 1,887 | 17,433 |
| Pottawattamie | 61.01% | 1,770 | 13.37% | 388 | 18.20% | 528 | 6.55% | 190 | 0.86% | 25 | 42.81% | 1,242 | 2,901 |
| Poweshiek | 51.86% | 293 | 23.36% | 132 | 15.40% | 87 | 8.14% | 46 | 1.24% | 7 | 28.50% | 161 | 565 |
| Ringgold | 59.28% | 131 | 29.41% | 65 | 7.24% | 16 | 2.26% | 5 | 1.81% | 4 | 29.86% | 66 | 221 |
| Sac | 54.72% | 174 | 16.35% | 52 | 16.35% | 52 | 11.32% | 36 | 1.26% | 4 | 38.36% | 122 | 318 |
| Scott | 49.20% | 2,857 | 18.32% | 1,064 | 24.30% | 1,411 | 7.68% | 446 | 0.50% | 29 | 24.90% | 1,446 | 5,807 |
| Shelby | 68.55% | 327 | 10.06% | 48 | 11.74% | 56 | 7.76% | 37 | 1.89% | 9 | 56.81% | 271 | 477 |
| Sioux | 44.98% | 964 | 31.12% | 667 | 15.59% | 334 | 6.16% | 132 | 2.15% | 46 | 13.86% | 297 | 2,143 |
| Story | 33.94% | 1,184 | 26.45% | 923 | 29.95% | 1,045 | 8.31% | 290 | 1.35% | 47 | 3.98% | 139 | 3,489 |
| Tama | 58.45% | 339 | 19.66% | 114 | 11.90% | 69 | 9.14% | 53 | 0.86% | 5 | 38.79% | 225 | 580 |
| Taylor | 69.06% | 125 | 16.02% | 29 | 8.84% | 16 | 6.08% | 11 | 0.00% | 0 | 53.04% | 96 | 181 |
| Union | 58.77% | 201 | 23.10% | 79 | 9.94% | 34 | 6.14% | 21 | 2.05% | 7 | 35.67% | 122 | 342 |
| Van Buren | 71.28% | 211 | 17.23% | 51 | 6.08% | 18 | 5.41% | 16 | 0.00% | 0 | 54.05% | 160 | 296 |
| Wapello | 71.64% | 538 | 12.52% | 94 | 9.19% | 69 | 6.26% | 47 | 0.40% | 3 | 59.12% | 444 | 751 |
| Warren | 51.29% | 1,292 | 26.52% | 668 | 15.16% | 382 | 6.43% | 162 | 0.60% | 15 | 24.77% | 624 | 2,519 |
| Washington | 57.27% | 496 | 22.29% | 193 | 12.12% | 105 | 7.51% | 65 | 0.81% | 7 | 34.99% | 303 | 866 |
| Wayne | 66.28% | 171 | 20.54% | 53 | 5.81% | 15 | 6.59% | 17 | 0.78% | 2 | 45.74% | 118 | 258 |
| Webster | 66.46% | 652 | 16.11% | 158 | 9.48% | 93 | 7.03% | 69 | 0.92% | 9 | 50.36% | 494 | 981 |
| Winnebago | 55.29% | 256 | 23.11% | 107 | 11.45% | 53 | 9.50% | 44 | 0.65% | 3 | 32.18% | 149 | 463 |
| Winneshiek | 53.90% | 415 | 17.27% | 133 | 19.22% | 148 | 7.40% | 57 | 2.21% | 17 | 34.68% | 267 | 770 |
| Woodbury | 56.62% | 1,565 | 21.53% | 595 | 13.17% | 364 | 6.80% | 188 | 1.88% | 52 | 35.09% | 970 | 2,764 |
| Worth | 66.90% | 194 | 12.07% | 35 | 10.00% | 29 | 10.34% | 30 | 0.69% | 2 | 54.83% | 159 | 290 |
| Wright | 55.21% | 212 | 22.92% | 88 | 14.32% | 55 | 6.77% | 26 | 0.78% | 3 | 32.29% | 124 | 384 |

== See also ==
- 2024 Iowa Democratic presidential caucuses
- 2024 Republican Party presidential primaries
- 2024 United States presidential election
- 2024 United States presidential election in Iowa
- 2024 United States elections

== Notes ==
Partisan clients
