= Iowa's 91st House of Representatives district =

American legislative district

House District 91
- Type: District of the Lower house
- Location: Iowa
- Representative: Judd Lawler
- Parent organization: Iowa General Assembly

The 91st District of the Iowa House of Representatives in the state of Iowa. It is currently composed of Iowa County, as well as part of Johnson County.

== Current elected officials ==
Judd Lawler is the representative currently representing the district.

== Past representatives ==
The district has previously been represented by:

- Lloyd F. Schmeiser, 1971–1973
- William E. Ewing, 1973–1975
- Fred L. Koogler, 1975–1979
- Harold Van Maanen, 1979–1983
- Randy Hughes, 1983–1987
- Jack Beaman, 1987–1995
- Rich Arnold, 1995–2003
- Dave Heaton, 2003–2013
- Mark Lofgren, 2013–2015
- Gary Carlson, 2015–2021
- Mark Cisneros, 2021–2023
- Brad Sherman, 2023–2025
- Judd Lawler, 2025–present
