= Iowa's 25th House of Representatives district =

American legislative district

House District 25
- Type: District of the Lower house
- Location: Iowa
- Representative: Hans Wilz
- Parent organization: Iowa General Assembly

The 25th District of the Iowa House of Representatives in the state of Iowa is part of Wapello County.

== Representatives ==
The district has been represented by:

- Warren E. Curtis, 1971–1973
- John E. Patchett, 1973–1981
- George E. Petrick, 1981–1983
- Donald L. Shoultz, 1983–2003
- Robert Osterhaus, 2003–2005
- Tom Schueller, 2005–2011
- Brian Moore, 2011–2013
- Julian Garrett, 2013–2013
- Stan Gustafson, 2013–2023
- Hans Wilz, 2023–present
