= Iowa's 22nd House of Representatives district =

American legislative district

House District 22
- Type: District of the Lower house
- Location: Iowa
- Representative: Stan Gustafson
- Parent organization: Iowa General Assembly

The 22nd District of the Iowa House of Representatives in the state of Iowa. It is currently composed of part of Warren County.

== Current elected officials ==
Samantha Fett is the representative currently representing the district.

== Past representatives ==
The district has previously been represented by:

- Alexander Hamilton Swan, 1872–1874
- E. Kevin Kelly, 1971–1973
- Maurice R. Hennessey, 1973–1977
- Nancy Shimanek, 1977–1981
- Donald J. Knapp, 1981–1983
- Raymond A. Lageschulte, 1983–1993
- Bob Brunkhorst, 1993–2003
- Deborah Berry, 2003–2013
- Greg Forristall, 2013–2017
- Jon Jacobsen, 2017–2023
- Stan Gustafson, 2023–2025
