= Mark Cisneros =

American politician (born 1970)

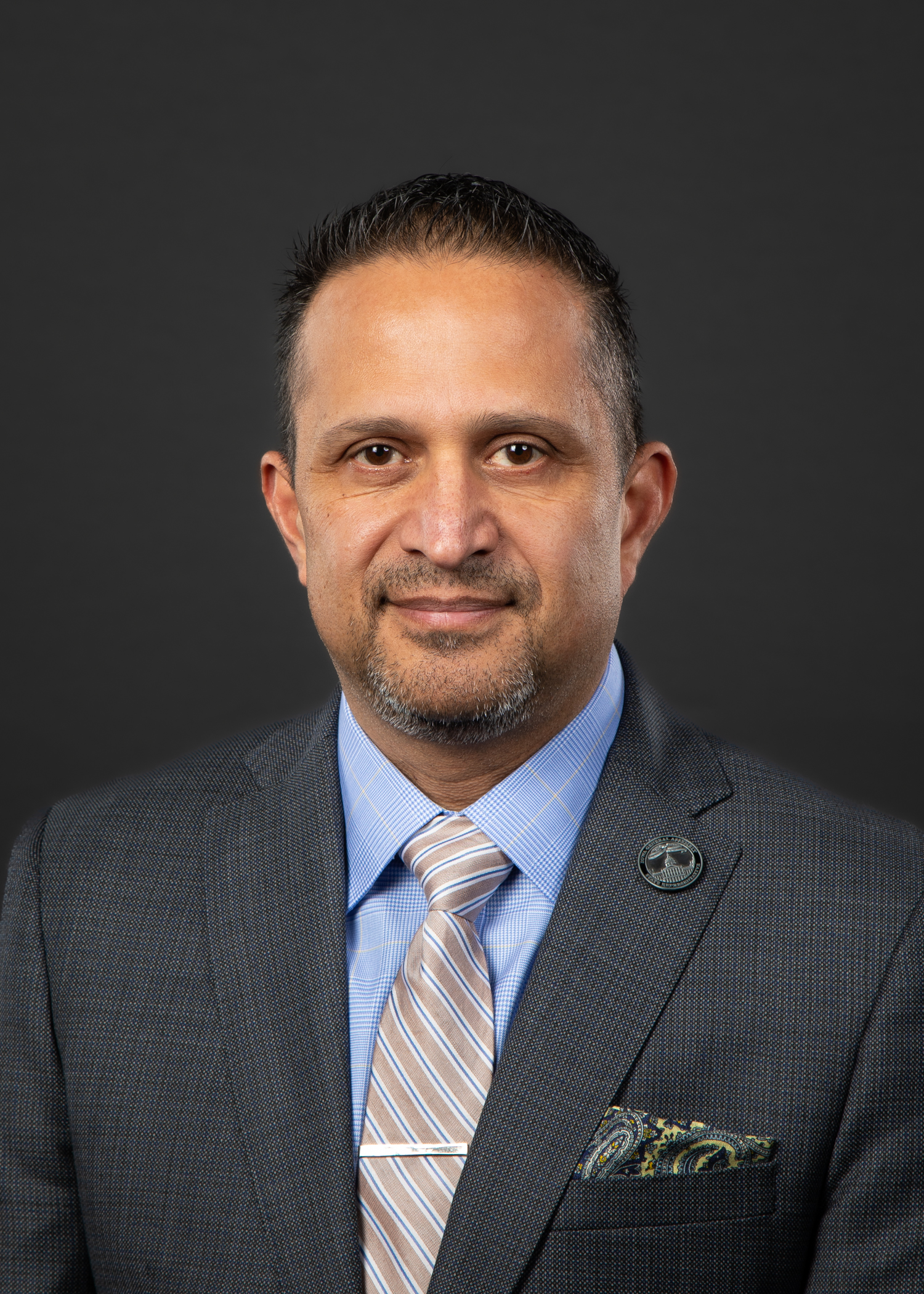

Member of the Iowa House of Representatives from the 96th district
- Incumbent
- Assumed office January 9, 2023
- Preceded by: Lee Hein
- Succeeded by: Nick Salazar (elect)

Member of the Iowa House of Representatives from the 91st district
- In office January 11, 2021 – January 8, 2023
- Preceded by: Gary Carlson
- Succeeded by: Judd Lawler

Personal details
- Born: 1970 (age 55–56)
- Party: Republican
- Children: 6

Mark Cisneros (born 1970) is an American politician and businessman serving as a member of the Iowa House of Representatives from the 96th district. Elected in November 2020, he assumed office on January 11, 2021.

== Early life ==
Born in 1970 to immigrants from Mexico, Cisneros was raised in Los Angeles County, California.

== Career ==
He began his career with the Los Angeles Park Ranger Division. Cisneros and his wife relocated from Los Angeles to Muscatine, Iowa in 2008. He has since owned and operated two retail stores with his wife and worked in the trucking industry. He was elected to the Iowa House of Representatives in November 2020 and assumed office on January 11, 2021. He is the vice chair of the House Commerce Committee. When Cisneros assumed office, he became the first member of the Iowa House of Hispanic heritage.

He was unseated by Democrat Nick Salazar in the 2026 election.

Iowa House of Representatives
Preceded by Lee Hein	96th District; 2023 – present	Succeeded by Incumbent
Preceded by Gary Carlson	91st District; 2021 – 2023	Succeeded by Brad Sherman
