= Betty De Boef =

American politician (born 1951)

Betty R. De Boef
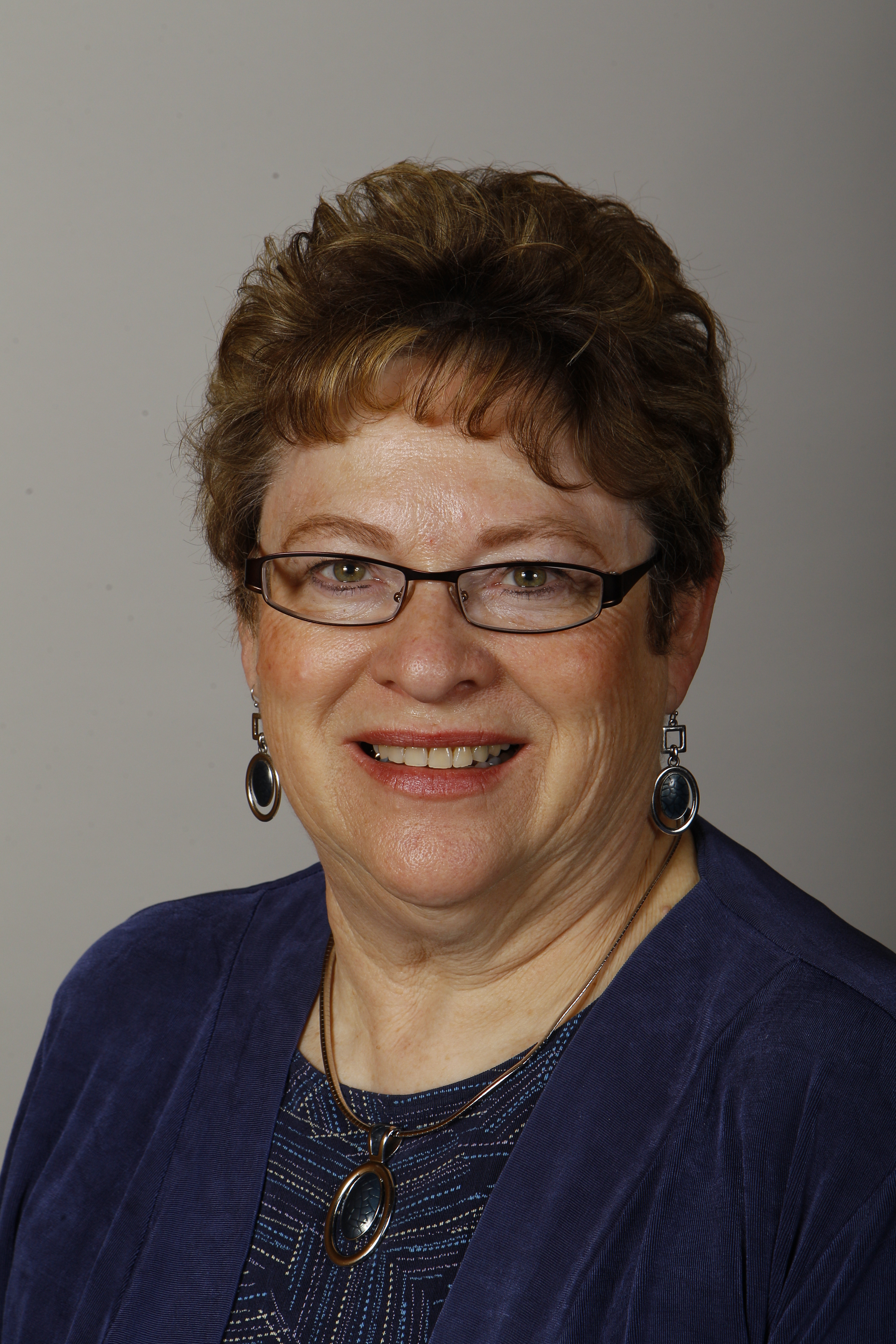
- Official portrait, 2011

Member of the Iowa House of Representatives from the 76th District district
- In office January 13, 2003 – January 13, 2013
- Preceded by: Scott Raecker
- Succeeded by: Dave Maxwell

Personal details
- Born: February 19, 1951 (age 75) Prairie City, Iowa
- Party: Republican
- Children: Jennifer, Eric, Michael, Lisa De Boef
- Website: De Boef's website

Betty R. De Boef (born February 19, 1951) is an American politician in the state of Iowa. A Republican, she served in the Iowa House of Representatives for the 96th district from 2001 to 2003 and for the 76th district from 2003 to 2012.

== Early life ==
De Boef was born in 1951 in Jasper County, Iowa. Her parents were George and Anna Den Besten. She grew up on a farm outside of Prairie City. She graduated from Pella Christian High School and Dordt College. She was a member of the Oskaloosa Christian Women's Club and the Mahaska County Republican Central Committee. She runs a family farm and wood grinding business. She married her husband, Harold De Boef, on February 20, 1971, and the couple have two sons and two daughters.

== Political career ==
De Boef was first elected to the Iowa House of Representatives for the 96th district in 2001, a position that she held until 2003. She was then elected as the representative for the 76th district between 2003 and 2012. She served on several committees in the legislature: the agriculture committee, the appropriations committee and the environmental protection committee. She was the ranking member of the agriculture and natural resources appropriations subcommittee.

De Boef was re-elected in 2006 with 5,819 votes (54%), defeating Democratic opponent Christopher Montross.

Iowa House of Representatives
Preceded by Sandra Greiner	96th District; 2001 – 2003	Succeeded by Cecil Dolecheck
Preceded by Scott Raecker	76th District; 2003 – 2012	Succeeded by Dave Maxwell
