= George Petrick =

American politician (1917–1982)

George E. Petrick (November 9, 1917 – June 26, 1982) was an American politician from Iowa.

== Life and career ==
George Petrick was born in Mount Vernon, Iowa, to parents Frank Petrick and Jennie Melichar on November 9, 1917. He graduated from Mount Vernon High School in 1935 and, two years later, began farming in the area. Petrick married Joanne Lnenicka, a Cedar Rapids native, on June 24, 1943, in Bertram. In 1959, Petrick began operating Allis Chalmers Farm Equipment, later eponymously named Petrick Implement Co. Inc. While running the business, Petrick became a member of the Iowa–Nebraska Farm Equipment Association. His farming operation became Petrick Farms, Inc. in 1975. Petrick was a Freemason.

Petrick was a member of several local organizations and deliberative bodies, including the Mount Vernon school board and parent teacher association, the Linn County zoning board, and the Linn Township Farm Bureau. He assumed leadership roles as president of the Mount Vernon Chamber of Commerce, the Lisbon–Mount Vernon Rotary Club, and the Mount Vernon Music Association. Petrick was credited with raising funds and organizing the Lisbon–Mount Vernon Ambulance Service, and was a trustee of the local Presbyterian church. He was elected to the Iowa House of Representatives as a Republican in November 1980, and held the 25th district seat. Petrick planned to run for reelection from the 43rd district, but died in office on June 26, 1982, at Mercy Hospital in Cedar Rapids.
