= Jack Beaman =

American politician (1924–1998)

M. W. (Jack) Beaman

Member of the Iowa House of Representatives from the 91st district
- In office January 12, 1987 – January 8, 1995
- Preceded by: Randy Hughes
- Succeeded by: Rich Arnold

Personal details
- Born: February 18, 1924 Hopeville, Iowa, U.S.
- Died: January 9, 1998 (aged 73) Des Moines, Iowa, U.S.
- Party: Republican
- Children: 3
- Occupation: Self-employed

M. W. (Jack) Beaman (February 18, 1924 – January 9, 1998), was an American politician from the state of Iowa.

Beaman was born February 18, 1924, in Hopeville, Iowa, to William and Mary Beaman. He graduated from Murray High School in 1942. He was a United States Army veteran of World War II. He served as a Republican in the Iowa House of Representatives from 1987 to 1995, representing Iowa's 91st House of Representatives district. Beaman died January 9, 1998, in Des Moines, Iowa.

Iowa House of Representatives
Preceded by Randy Hughes	91st district 1987–1995	Succeeded by Rich Arnold
