= Scott Raecker =

Member of the Iowa House of Representatives

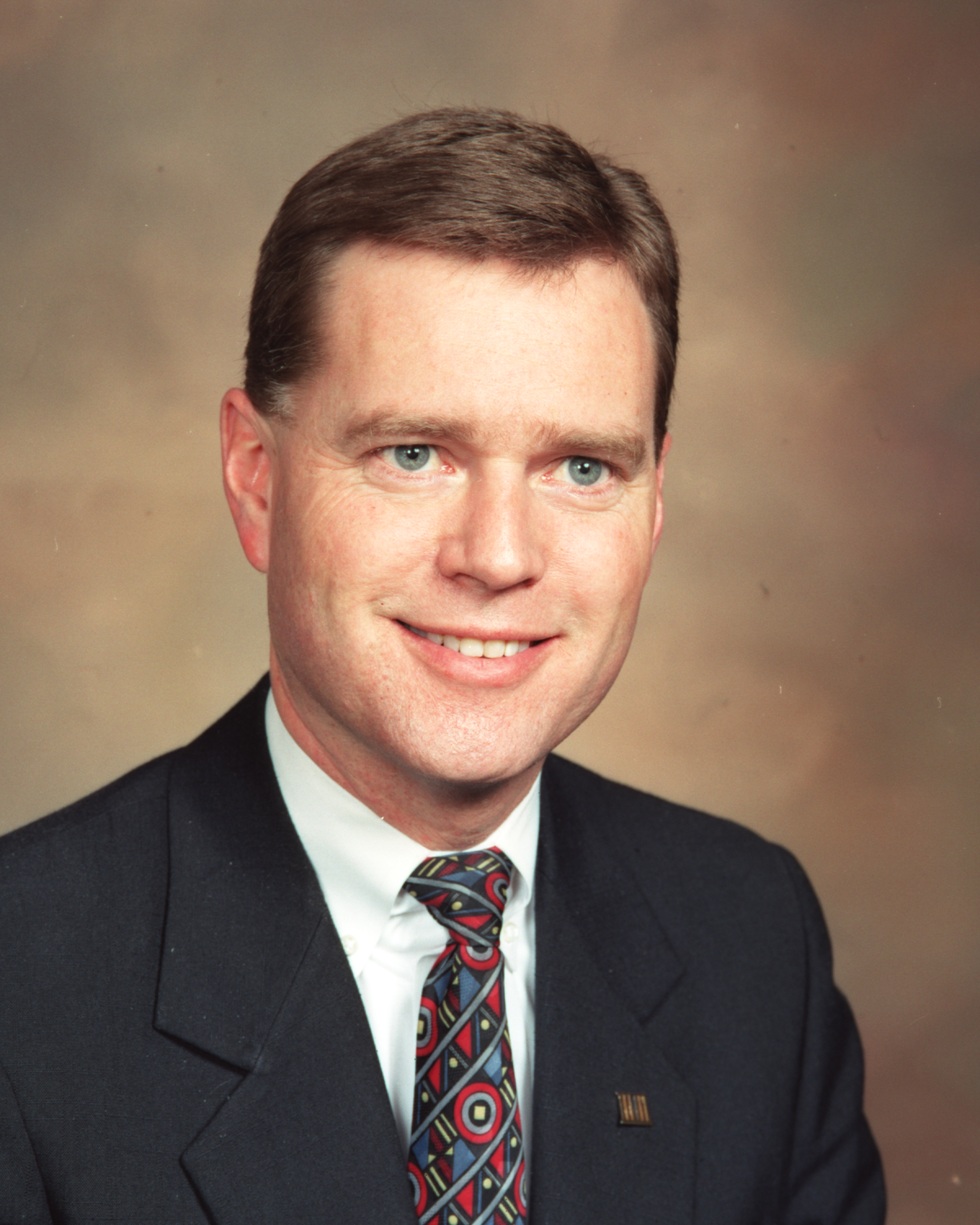
- Official portrait, 2001

Member of the Iowa House of Representatives
- In office January 11, 1999 – December 2012
- Preceded by: Steven Churchill
- Succeeded by: Sandy Salmon
- Constituency: 76th district (1999–2003); 63rd district (2003–2012)

Personal details
- Born: August 30, 1961 (age 65) Waterloo, Iowa
- Party: Republican
- Spouse: Martha
- Children: Emily and Max
- Education: Grinnell College

J. Scott Raecker (born August 30, 1961) is a politician. He served in the Iowa House of Representatives from January 1999 to December 2012, representing the 63rd District. He received his BA in Political Science and Religious Studies from Grinnell College.

A Republican, Raecker served on several committees in the Iowa House - as chair of the Appropriations Committee, as vice chair of the Ethics Committee, and as a member of the State Government committee. He also served on the Governor's 2010 Strategic Planning Council in 2000 and the 21st Century Workforce Council in 1999.

He gained notoriety in 2011 for introducing legislation that would have required the University of Iowa to sell Jackson Pollock's Mural (1943), which the university owns and regularly displays at the University of Iowa Museum of Art. Raecker wanted the university to use proceeds from the sale to fund scholarships for University of Iowa students from Iowa. The painting's value was estimated at $140 million to $150 million. Raecker's bill did not become law.

In addition to his political career, Raecker has served as director of the Robert D. and Billie Ray Center (formerly known as Character Counts!) at Drake University.

== Electoral history ==
District 76 elections (1998 – 2000)

Election	Political result	Candidate	Party	Votes	%
Iowa House of Representatives primary elections, 1998; District 76; Turnout: 2,677	Republican	Scott Raecker	Republican	1,924	71.9
Iowa House of Representatives primary elections, 1998; District 76; Turnout: 2,677	Republican	Lon Anderson	Republican	752	28.1
Iowa House of Representatives elections, 1998; District 76; Turnout: 14,066	Republican hold	Scott Raecker	Republican	7,834	55.7
Iowa House of Representatives elections, 1998; District 76; Turnout: 14,066	Republican hold	Michele Soria	Democratic	6,226	44.3
Iowa House of Representatives elections, 2000; District 76; Turnout: 18,865	Republican hold	Scott Raecker*	Republican	11,150	59.1
Iowa House of Representatives elections, 2000; District 76; Turnout: 18,865	Republican hold	Mike Harkin	Democratic	7,692	40.7

Election	Political result	Candidate	Party	Votes	%
Iowa House of Representatives elections, 2002; District 63	Republican (newly redistricted)	Scott Raecker*	Republican	unopposed	
Iowa House of Representatives elections, 2004; District 63; Turnout: 17,549	Republican hold	Scott Raecker*	Republican	11,408	65.0
Iowa House of Representatives elections, 2004; District 63; Turnout: 17,549	Republican hold	Dan Scannell	Democratic	6,125	34.9
Iowa House of Representatives elections, 2006; District 63	Republican hold	Scott Raecker*	Republican	unopposed	
Iowa House of Representatives elections, 2008; District 63; Turnout: 18,542	Republican hold	Scott Raecker*	Republican	11,265	60.8
Iowa House of Representatives elections, 2008; District 63; Turnout: 18,542	Republican hold	Nita Garvin	Democratic	7,251	39.1
Iowa House of Representatives elections, 2010; District 63; Turnout: 15,590	Republican hold	Scott Raecker*	Republican	9,543	61.2
Iowa House of Representatives elections, 2010; District 63; Turnout: 15,590	Republican hold	John E. Sachs	Democratic	5,227	33.5

*incumbent

Iowa House of Representatives
Preceded by Steven Churchill	76th District; 1999 – 2003	Succeeded by Betty De Boef
Preceded by Teresa Garman	63rd District; 2003 – present	Succeeded by Incumbent
