= Nick Salazar (Iowa politician) =

American politician

Member of the Iowa House of Representatives from the 96th district
- Member-elect
- Assumed office January 1, 2027
- Preceded by: Mark Cisneros

Personal details
- Party: Democratic
- Website: Campaign website

Nick Salazar is an American politician. A member of the Democratic Party, he was elected to the Iowa House of Representatives in 2026, representing the 96th district. He unseated Republican Mark Cisneros in the 2026 election. His family migrated to Muscatine, Iowa in the 1960s.
