= Samantha Fett =

American politician

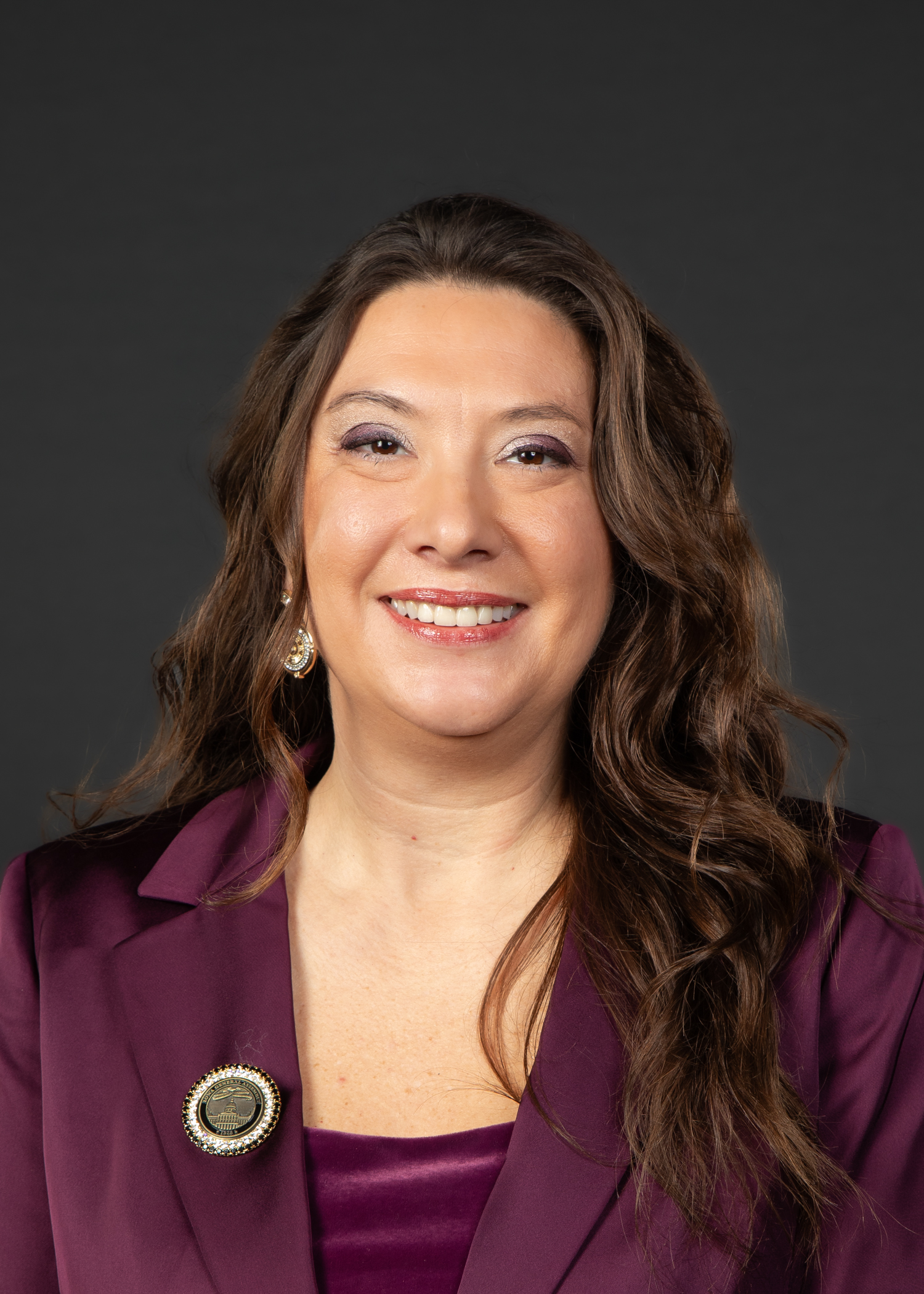

Member of the Iowa House of Representatives from the 22nd district
- Incumbent
- Assumed office January 13, 2025
- Preceded by: Stan Gustafson

Personal details
- Party: Republican
- Education: Drake University
- Website: www.fettforhouse.com

Samantha Fett (born 1979) is an American politician. She serves as a Republican member for the 22nd district in the Iowa House of Representatives since 2025.

Fett was born in Chicago and studied journalism and advertising at Drake University, graduating in 2001. She worked in communications and marketing, including as a former sales and marketing director for the Iowa Newspaper Association. Prior to her election, Fett served on the Carlisle School Board and was chair of the Warren County chapter of Moms for Liberty.

In 2024, she defeated Garrett Gobble in the Republican primary and Democrat Rory Taylor in the general election. She took office in January 2025, succeeding Stan Gustafson. In the House, Fett is a member of the committees on Government Oversight, Agriculture, Judiciary, and Education, the lattermost of which she serves as vice chair.

Fett resides in Carlisle.
