= Lloyd Schmeiser =

American politician (1921–2013)

Lloyd Franklin Schmeiser (January 1, 1921 – October 17, 2013) was an American politician.

Lloyd Schmeiser was born in Benton Township, Des Moines County, Iowa, on January 1, 1921, to parents Benjamin Schmeiser and Mary Taeger. Schmeiser attended Burlington High School and was a farmer.

Schmeiser began his political career with a four-year term as clerk of Benton Township, and was elected to four years as treasurer of the local school board before serving as member of the county school board for eleven years, including three as president. He was first elected to the Iowa House of Representatives in November 1968, as a Democrat for District 21. In 1970, Schmeiser was redistricted and won reelection in District 91.

Schmeiser died on October 17, 2013, aged 92.
