= Jon Jacobsen =

American politician (born 1961)

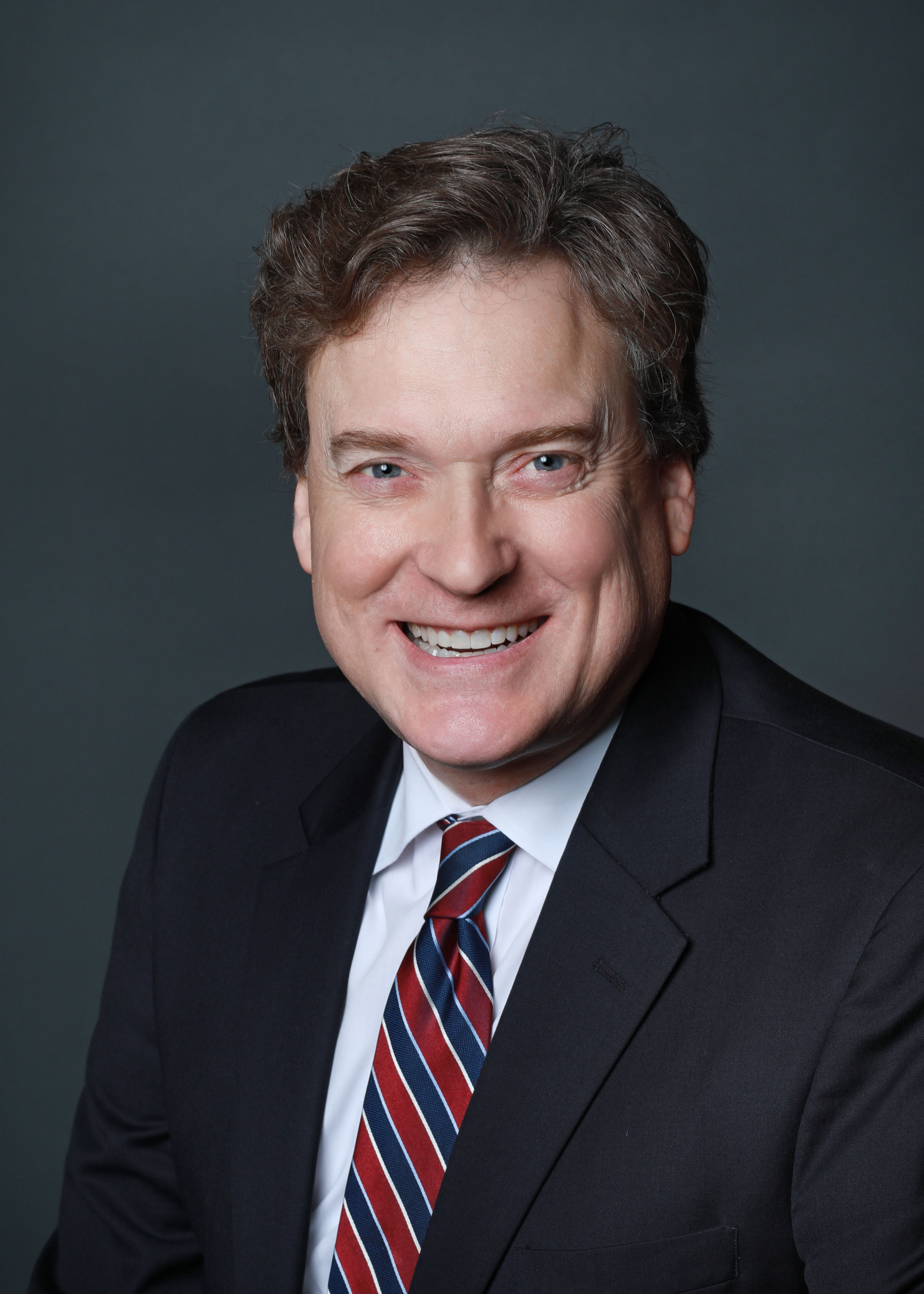
- Jacobsen in 2021

Member of the Iowa House of Representatives from the 22nd district
- In office July 12, 2017 – January 9, 2023
- Preceded by: Greg Forristall
- Succeeded by: Stan Gustafson (redistricting)

Personal details
- Born: 1961 (age 64–65) Omaha, Nebraska, U.S.
- Party: Republican
- Education: Creighton University (BSBA); University of Iowa (JD)

Jon Jacobsen (born 1961) is an American politician who served as a member of the Iowa House of Representatives from the 22nd district. He was elected in a July 12, 2017 special election. Jacobsen is an attorney and a trust officer in a bank.

== Early life and education ==
Jacobsen was born in Omaha, Nebraska in 1961. He earned a Bachelor of Science in Business Administration from Creighton University and a Juris Doctor from the University of Iowa College of Law. In law school, Jacobsen was the associate managing editor of The Journal of Corporation Law.

== Career ==
Jacobsen worked as a senior trust officer and vice president at Security National Bank. He also hosted Now You've Heard It All on KMA. He has been a member of the Pottawattamie County Republican Central Committee and the Iowa Right to Life Committee. Jacobsen was elected to the Iowa House of Representatives in a July 12, 2017 special election, succeeding Greg Forristall. On Monday, May 23, 2022, during the 2022 extended legislative session, Jacobsen announced that he was joining the US Coast Guard and would not be seeking re-election prior to walking out of the session before adjournment. Jacobsen is not seeking reelection to the House, but is considering a run for the state senate in 2024. As of May 24, 2022 his website solicits donations for his November 2022 re-election, linking to his winred.com fundraising site.
