= Dean Fisher =

American politician

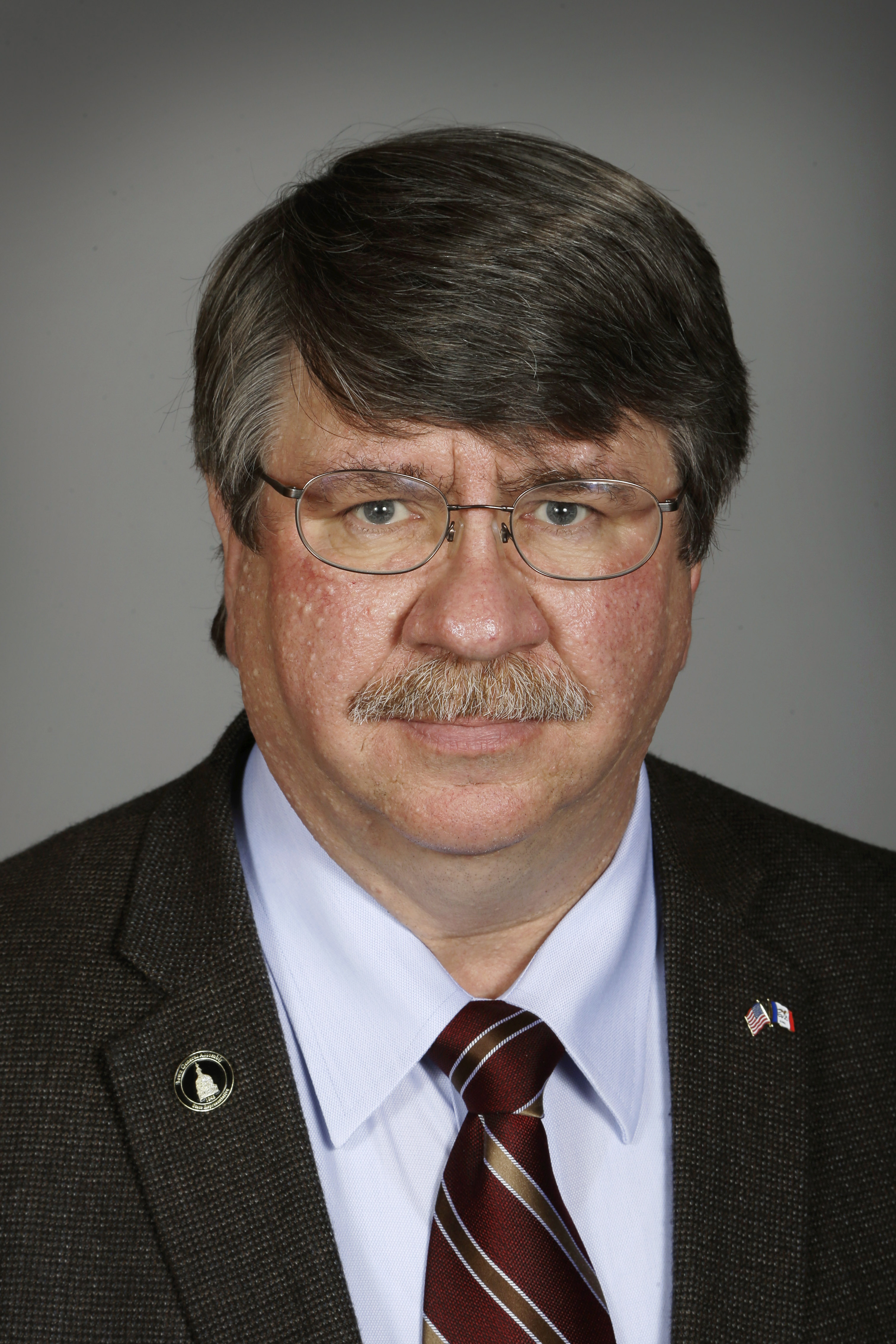

Member of the Iowa House of Representatives from the 53rd district
- Incumbent
- Assumed office January 14, 2013
- Preceded by: Rich Arnold

Personal details
- Born: September 3, 1956 (age 70) Garwin, Iowa, U.S.
- Party: Republican
- Spouse: Vicki
- Education: DeVry Institute of Technology (Chicago, Illinois)
- Profession: Electronics engineer, farmer
- Website: www.deanfisher.com

Dean C. Fisher (born September 3, 1956) is an American politician who has served in the Iowa House of Representatives representing the 53rd district since 2013. Fisher is a Republican.

== Early life and education ==
Fisher was born in 1956 and raised in Garwin, Iowa in Tama County.

In 1975 he graduated of South Tama Community High School. He earned a Bachelor of Electronics Engineering Technology from DeVry Institute of Technology in Chicago, Illinois, in 1978.

== Career ==
Fisher spent 26 years in the electronics industry as an engineer, engineering manager, and business manager. He worked for Qwint Systems, IO Vision, Autotech, and from 1986 until 2004 at Motorola in the Automotive Electronics division.

From 2010 to 2011, Fisher was the chair of his county's Republican Party. He also served as the Indian Village Township Clerk from 2008 to 2013.

Since 2013, he has been an Iowa State Representative for the Republican Party of Iowa from the 53rd District. He has chaired the environmental protection committee, sits on the agriculture Committee and the public safety committee.

In 2019, Fisher blocked the Farm System Reform Act from being heard.

In January 2024, Fisher founded a private Christian school named Tama Toledo Christian School, which opened in August 2025. Because school operations will be funded by Coverdell education savings account, Iowa Citizens Community Action alleged a conflict of interest and filed an ethics complaint with the Chief Clerk of the House.

=== Committee assignments ===
As of January 2026, Fisher serves on the following committees in the Iowa House.

- Environmental Protection (chair)
- Agriculture
- Natural Resources
- Public Safety

== Personal life ==
Fisher is married to Vicky Fisher, also on the Board of the Tama Toledo Christian School. They reside in rural Montour, Iowa on a heritage farm which has been in his family since 1852.

Fisher is a member of the National Rifle Association of America; Iowa Firearms Coalition; Amateur Trapshooting Association and the Iowa State Trapshooting Association. He is also a member of the American Farm Bureau Federation, the American Motorcycle Association, A Brotherhood Aimed Towards Education (motorcycle organization), The Heritage Foundation, and the Colonial Williamsburg Foundation's W.A.R. Goodwin Society. Among his hobbies are hunting, trapshooting, woodworking, model airplanes, motorcycling, quilting, genealogy, horticulture, and astronomy.

Iowa House of Representatives
Preceded by Sharon Steckman	53rd District; 2023 – present	Succeeded by Incumbent
Preceded by Rich Arnold	72nd District; 2013 – 2023	Succeeded by Charles Isenhart
