= Greg Forristall =

American politician (1950–2017)

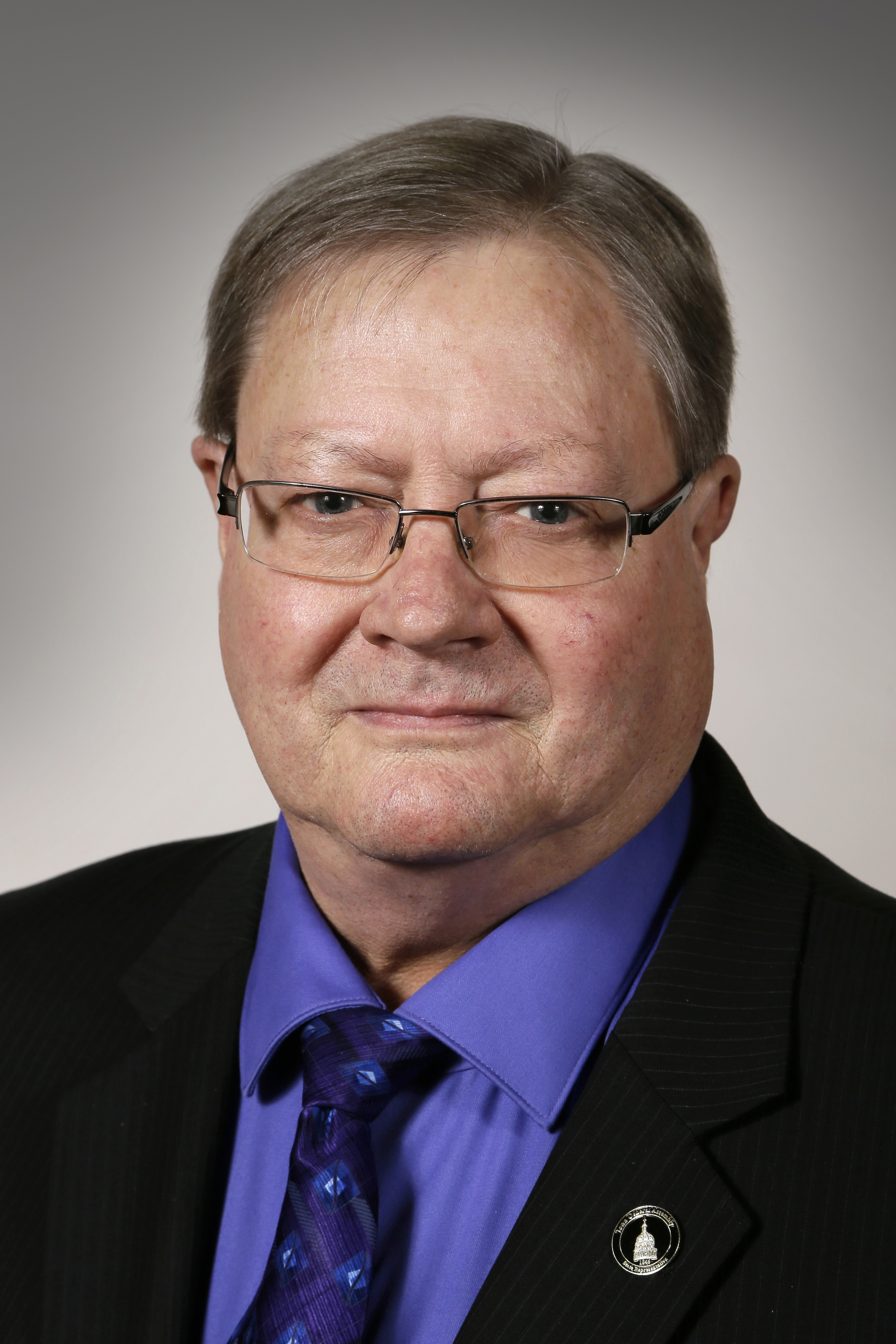

Member of the Iowa House of Representatives from the 22nd district 98th (2007–2013)
- In office January 8, 2007 – May 10, 2017
- Preceded by: Gerald D. Jones
- Succeeded by: Jon Jacobsen

Personal details
- Born: February 15, 1950 Council Bluffs, Iowa, U.S.
- Died: May 10, 2017 (aged 67) Omaha, Nebraska, U.S.
- Party: Republican
- Spouse: Carol
- Education: University of Iowa (BA, MA)
- Occupation: Farmer

Gregory Forristall (February 15, 1950 – May 10, 2017) was an American politician who served in the Iowa House of Representatives from 2007 until his death in 2017.

Prior to his death, Forristall served on several committees in the Iowa House, including Human Resources, Transportation, and Ways and Means committees. He also served as the chair of the Labor committee and as a member of the Economic Development Appropriations Subcommittee.

== Early life and education ==
Forristall was born in Council Bluffs, Iowa, and was raised and lived near Macedonia. After graduation from Carson-Macedonia High School in 1968, he went on to complete coursework in computer science and international marketing at Iowa Western Community College and earned bachelor's and master's degrees in music at the University of Iowa in 1972 and 1973 respectively.

== Career ==
Forristall worked as a farmer for 25 years and also worked in the financial services and information technology industries.

Forristall was active in the community with organizations such as the Council Bluffs Sister Cities, Farm Bureau, the Iowa Corn Promotion Board and the Iowa Western Community College Board. He was a member of the United States Grain Council and served on the Iowa State Board of Education and the Iowa Community College Council. Forristall was a founding and continuing member of the Grist Mill Fine Arts Council.

He chaired the Education Task Force of the American Legislative Exchange Council and was on the executive committee of the Midwest Higher Education Compact. Forristall also represented Iowa in national meetings of the Lumina Foundation and the Foundation for Excellence in Education.

Forristall was first elected to represent House District 98 in November 2006. He shifted to representing District 22 when the maps were redrawn in 2010.

In March 2014, he filed a police report stating he had been assaulted by a private citizen at Iowa State Capitol. During a June 2014 trial lasting two days, a jury of six people determined the defendant not guilty after one hour of deliberation.

== Personal life ==
He resided in Macedonia, Iowa, with his wife, Carol, who taught music in Iowa public schools for thirty-five years. The two were married in 1978.

Forristall died on May 10, 2017, in Omaha, Nebraska, of cancer at the age of 67. Following his death, his wife Carol sought to replace him. She lost the Republican nomination to Jon Jacobsen.

== Electoral history ==
*incumbent

Election	Political result	Candidate	Party	Votes	%
Iowa House of Representatives primary elections, 2006; District 98; Turnout: 1,543	Republican	Greg Forristall	Republican	1,116	72.33%
Iowa House of Representatives primary elections, 2006; District 98; Turnout: 1,543	Republican	Sharon McNutt	Republican	426	27.61%
Iowa House of Representatives general elections, 2006; District 98; Turnout: 10,817	Republican hold	Greg Foristall	Republican	6,570	60.74%
Iowa House of Representatives general elections, 2006; District 98; Turnout: 10,817	Republican hold	Sally Vitamvas	Democratic	3,858	35.67%
Iowa House of Representatives primary elections, 2008; District 98	Republican	Greg Foristall*	Republican	unopposed	
Iowa House of Representatives general elections, 2008; District 98	Republican hold	Greg Foristall*	Republican	unopposed	
Iowa House of Representatives primary elections, 2010; District 98	Republican	Greg Foristall*	Republican	unopposed	
Iowa House of Representatives general elections, 2010; District 98	Republican hold	Greg Foristall*	Republican	unopposed	
Iowa House of Representatives primary elections, 2012; District 22; Turnout: 4,410	Republican	Greg Foristall*	Republican	2,529	57.35%
Iowa House of Representatives primary elections, 2012; District 22; Turnout: 4,410	Republican	Clint Fichter	Republican	1,615	36.62%
Iowa House of Representatives general elections, 2012; District 22	Republican (newly redistricted)	Greg Foristall*	Republican	unopposed	
Iowa House of Representatives general elections, 2014; District 22	Republican hold	Greg Foristall*	Republican	unopposed	
Iowa House of Representatives primary elections, 2016; District 22; Turnout: 1,200	Republican	Greg Forristall	Republican	962	80.17%
Iowa House of Representatives primary elections, 2016; District 22; Turnout: 1,200	Republican	Bryan Holder	Republican	238	19.83%
Iowa House of Representatives general elections, 2016; District 22	Republican hold	Greg Foristall*	Republican	unopposed	

Iowa House of Representatives
Preceded by Gerald D. Jones	98th District; 2007–2013	Succeeded by Mary Wolfe
Preceded by Deborah Berry	22nd District; 2013–2017	Succeeded by Jon Jacobsen
