= Rich Arnold =

American politician (born 1945)

Richard D. Arnold
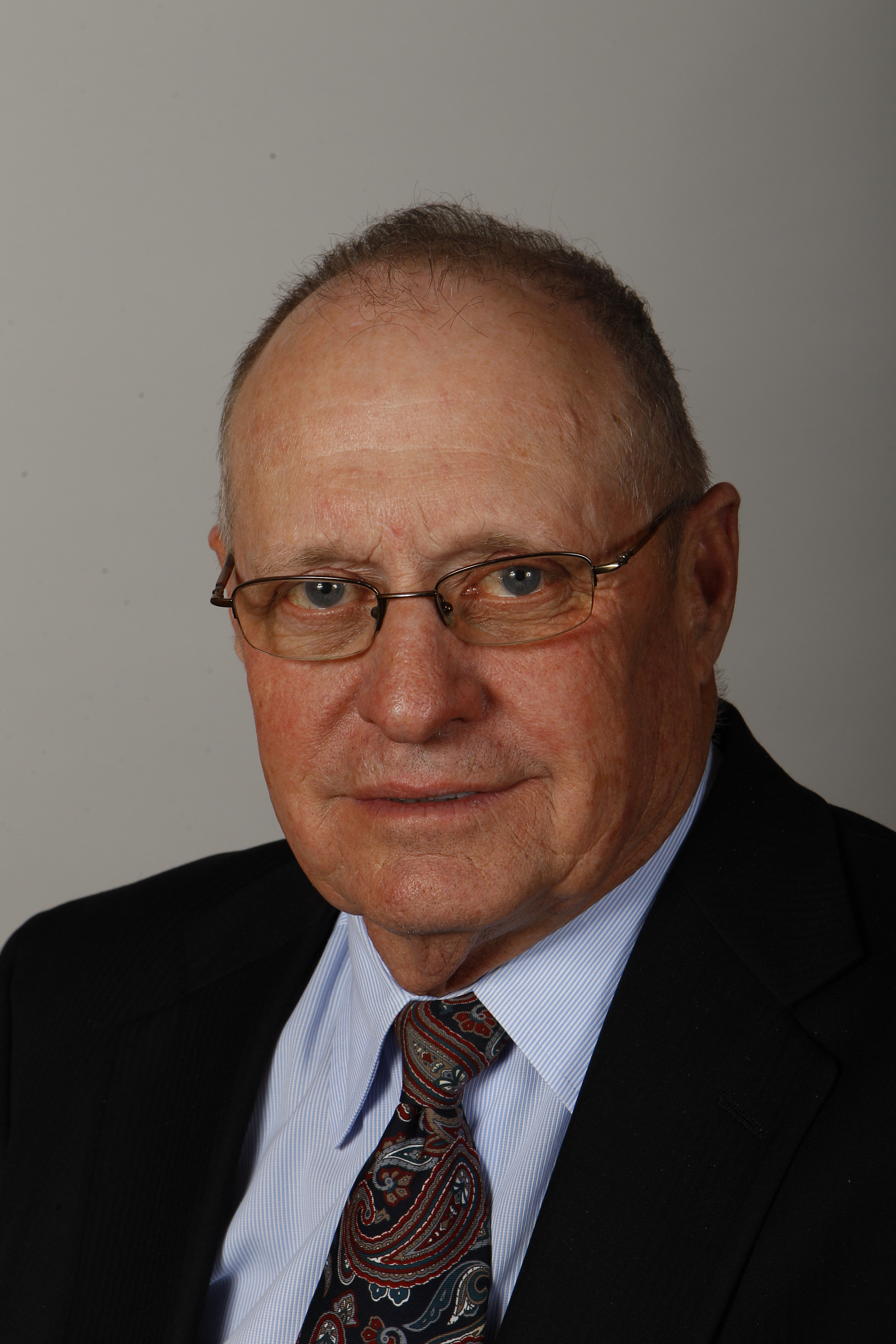

Member of the Iowa House of Representatives from the 72nd district
- In office 2003–2013
- Preceded by: Janet Petersen
- Succeeded by: Dean Fisher

Member of the Iowa House of Representatives from the 91st district
- In office January 9, 1995 – 2003
- Preceded by: Jack Beaman
- Succeeded by: Dave Heaton

Personal details
- Born: February 9, 1945 (age 81) Russell, Iowa, U.S.
- Party: Republican
- Spouse: Cheryl
- Education: University of Iowa
- Occupation: State Representative
- Website: www3.legis.state.ia.us/ga/member.do?id=91

Richard D. Arnold (born February 9, 1945) is an Iowa State Representative from the 72nd District. He was first elected to the Iowa House of Representatives in 1994.

== Early life and education ==
Arnold was raised in Russell, Iowa. He obtained his degree in Animal Science from Iowa State University.

== Career ==
=== Politics ===
Arnold has served on several committees in the Iowa House - the Local Government committee; the Natural Resources committee; and the Transportation committee. His prior political experience includes serving on the Lucas County Board of Supervisors from 1987 to 1994 and also on the Russell City Council.

Arnold was re-elected in 2006 with 6,117 votes (60%), defeating Democratic opponent Buzz Malone.

=== Farming ===
He is also a farmer and co-owner of Arnold Farm and Trucking.

== Organizations ==
He is an active member of the following organizations:

- National Wild Turkey Federation
- Pheasants Forever
- Iowa Cattleman’s Association

== Family ==
Arnold is married to his wife Cheryl and together they have five children and eight grandchildren.

Iowa House of Representatives
Preceded by Jack Beaman	91st District; 1995 – 2003	Succeeded by Dave Heaton
Preceded by Janet Petersen	72nd District; 2003 – 2013	Succeeded by Dean Fisher
