= Iowa's 96th House of Representatives district =

American legislative district

House District 96
- Type: District of the Lower house
- Location: Iowa
- Representative: Mark Cisneros
- Parent organization: Iowa General Assembly

The 96th District of the Iowa House of Representatives in the state of Iowa is part of Muscatine County.

== Representatives ==
The district has previously been represented by:

- Delmont Moffitt, 1971–1973
- Horace Daggett, 1973–1983
- Louis Muhlbauer, 1983–1993
- Sandy Greiner, 1993–2001
- Betty De Boef, 2001–2003
- Cecil Dolecheck, 2003–2013
- Lee Hein, 2013–2023
- Mark Cisneros, 2023–2027
- Nick Salazar, 2027–Present
