= Steven E. Churchill =

American paleoanthropologist

- Born: Steven Emilio Churchill
- Education: Virginia Polytechnic Institute and State University; University of New Mexico
- Scientific career
- Fields: Paleoanthropology
- Institutions: Duke University
- Thesis: Human upper body evolution in the Eurasian later Pleistocene (1994)

Steven E. Churchill is an American paleoanthropologist who has been a professor in the Department of Evolutionary Anthropology at Duke University since 2013. He was one of the leaders of a 2015 expedition that led to the discovery of a large trove of Homo naledi fossils in a cave near Johannesburg, South Africa.
