= Brad Sherman (Iowa politician) =

American pastor and politician

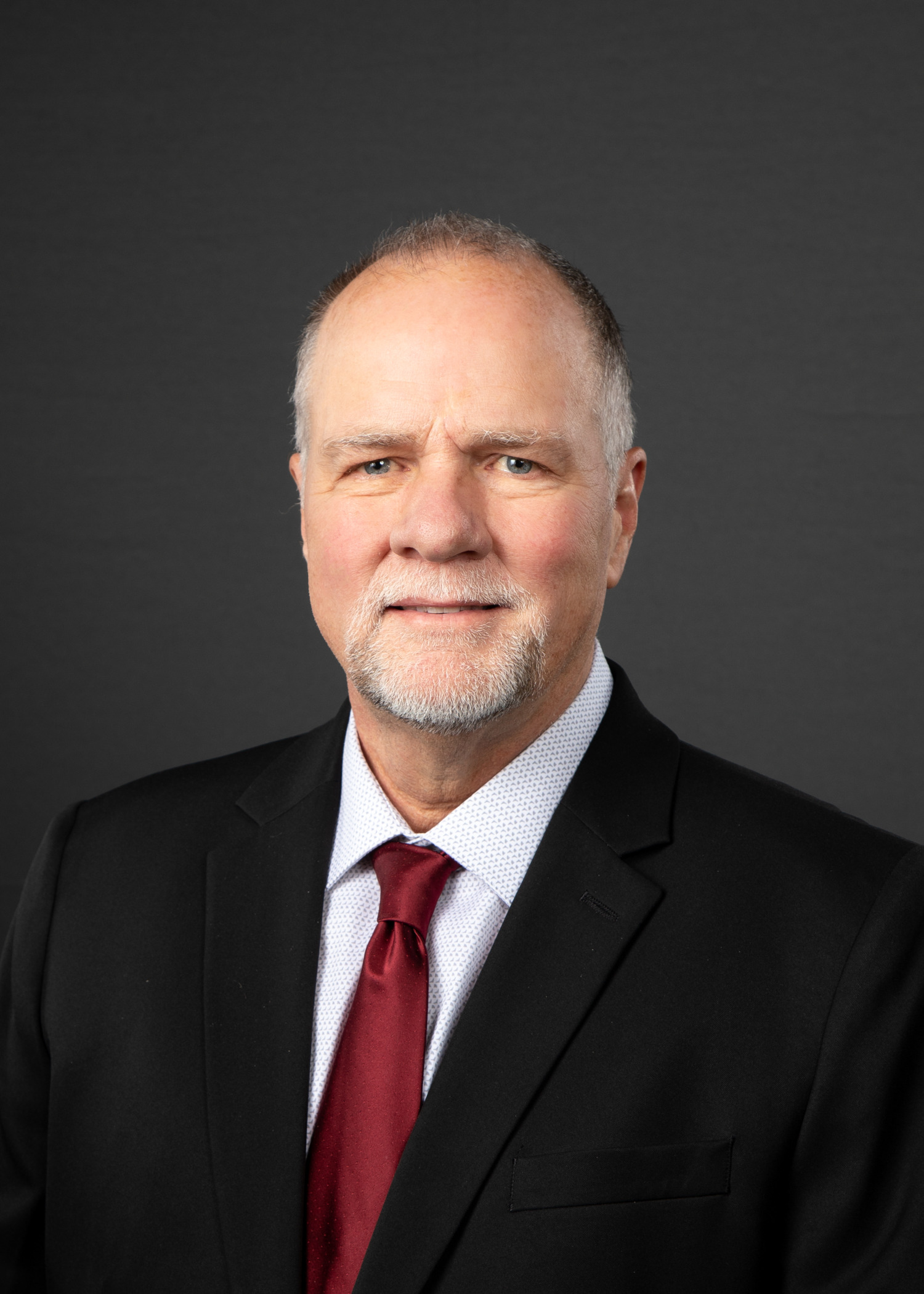
- Official portrait, c. 2023

Member of the Iowa House of Representatives from the 91st district
- In office January 9, 2023 – January 13, 2025
- Preceded by: Mark Cisneros
- Succeeded by: Judd Lawler

Personal details
- Born: 1953 or 1954 (age 71–72) Missouri, U.S.
- Party: Republican
- Spouse: Carole
- Children: 4

Brad Sherman (born 1953/1954) is an American pastor and politician who represented District 91 in the Iowa House of Representatives from 2023 to 2025. In February 2025, Sherman announced his candidacy for the 2026 Iowa gubernatorial election. He placed fourth in the Republican primary.
