= Hans Wilz =

American politician

Hans Christian Wilz
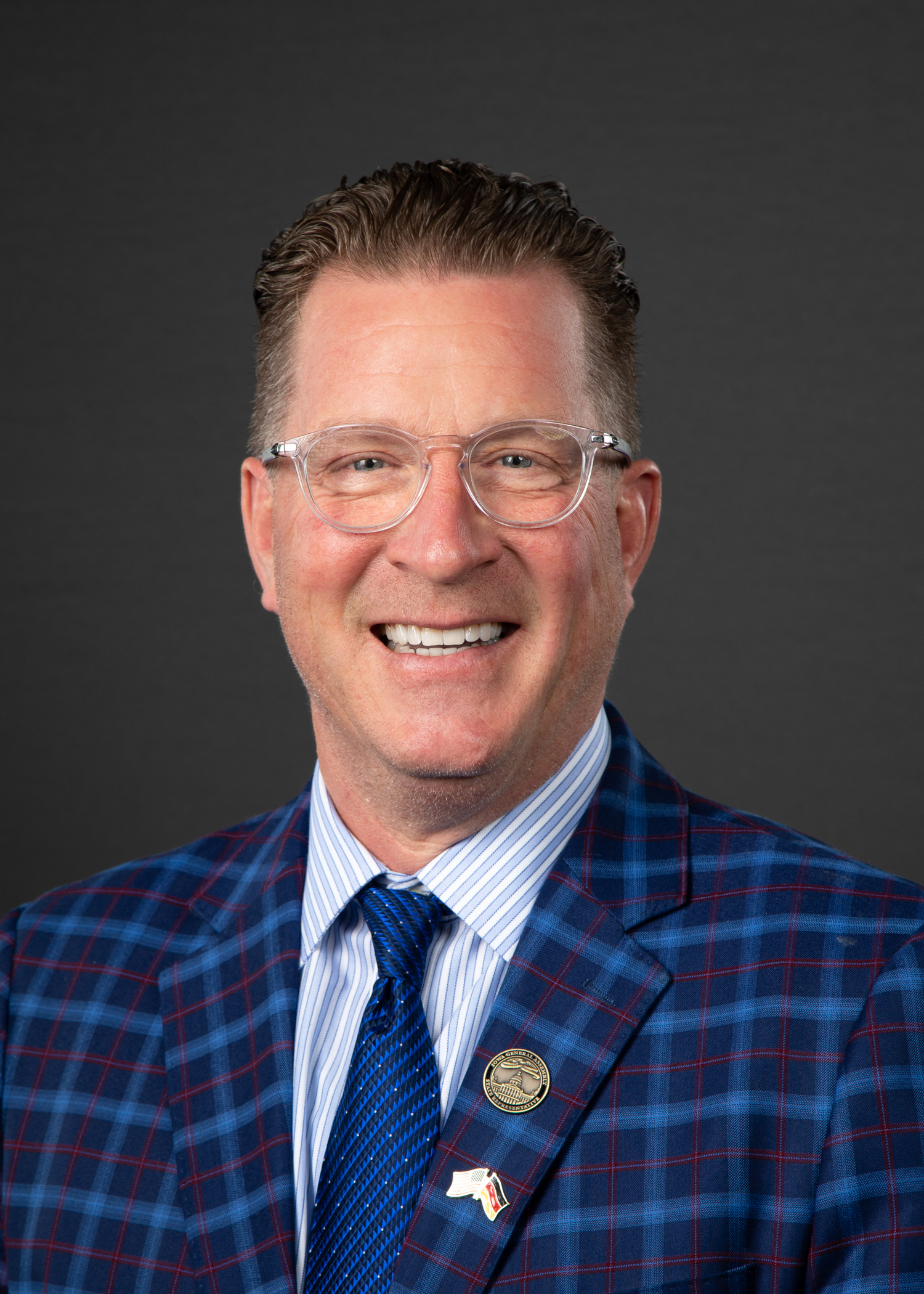

Member of the Iowa House of Representatives from the 25th district
- Incumbent
- Assumed office January 9, 2023
- Preceded by: Stan Gustafson

Personal details
- Born: Hans C. Wilz; 1965 or 1966 Ottumwa, Iowa, U.S.
- Party: Republican
- Education: University of Northern Iowa

Hans Christian Wilz (born 1965 or 1966), is an American politician from the state of Iowa.

Wilz was born in Ottumwa, Iowa and has resided there ever since.

== Electoral history ==
*incumbent

=== 2022 ===
| Election | Political result | Candidate | Party | Votes | % |
|---|---|---|---|---|---|
| Iowa House primary elections, 2022; District 25 | Republican | Hans C. Wilz | Republican | 997 | 58.03 |
| Iowa House primary elections, 2022; District 25 | Republican | Corwin Williams | Democratic | 720 | 41.91 |
| Iowa House primary elections, 2022; District 25 | Republican | Write-ins | | 1 | 0.06 |
| Iowa House general election, 2022; District 25 | Republican | Hans C. Wilz | Republican | 5,677 | 63.08 |
| Iowa House general election, 2022; District 25 | Republican | Diana M. Swartz | Democratic | 3,307 | 36.75 |
| Iowa House general election, 2022; District 25 | Republican | Write-ins | | 15 | 0.17 |

=== 2024 ===
| Election | Political result | Candidate | Party | Votes | % |
|---|---|---|---|---|---|
| Iowa House primary elections, 2024; District 25 | Republican | Hans C. Wilz* | Republican | 442 | 98.00 |
| Iowa House primary elections, 2024; District 25 | Republican | Write-ins | Republican | 9 | 2.00 |
| Iowa House general election, 2024; District 25 | Republican | Hans C. Wilz* | Republican | 7,965 | 64.77 |
| Iowa House general election, 2024; District 25 | Republican | Brenda Curran | Democratic | 4,320 | 35.13 |
| Iowa House general election, 2024; District 25 | Republican | Write-ins | | 12 | 0.10 |

Iowa House of Representatives
| Preceded by Stan Gustafson | 25th district 2023–2025 | Succeeded by Incumbent |
