= Judd Lawler =

American politician

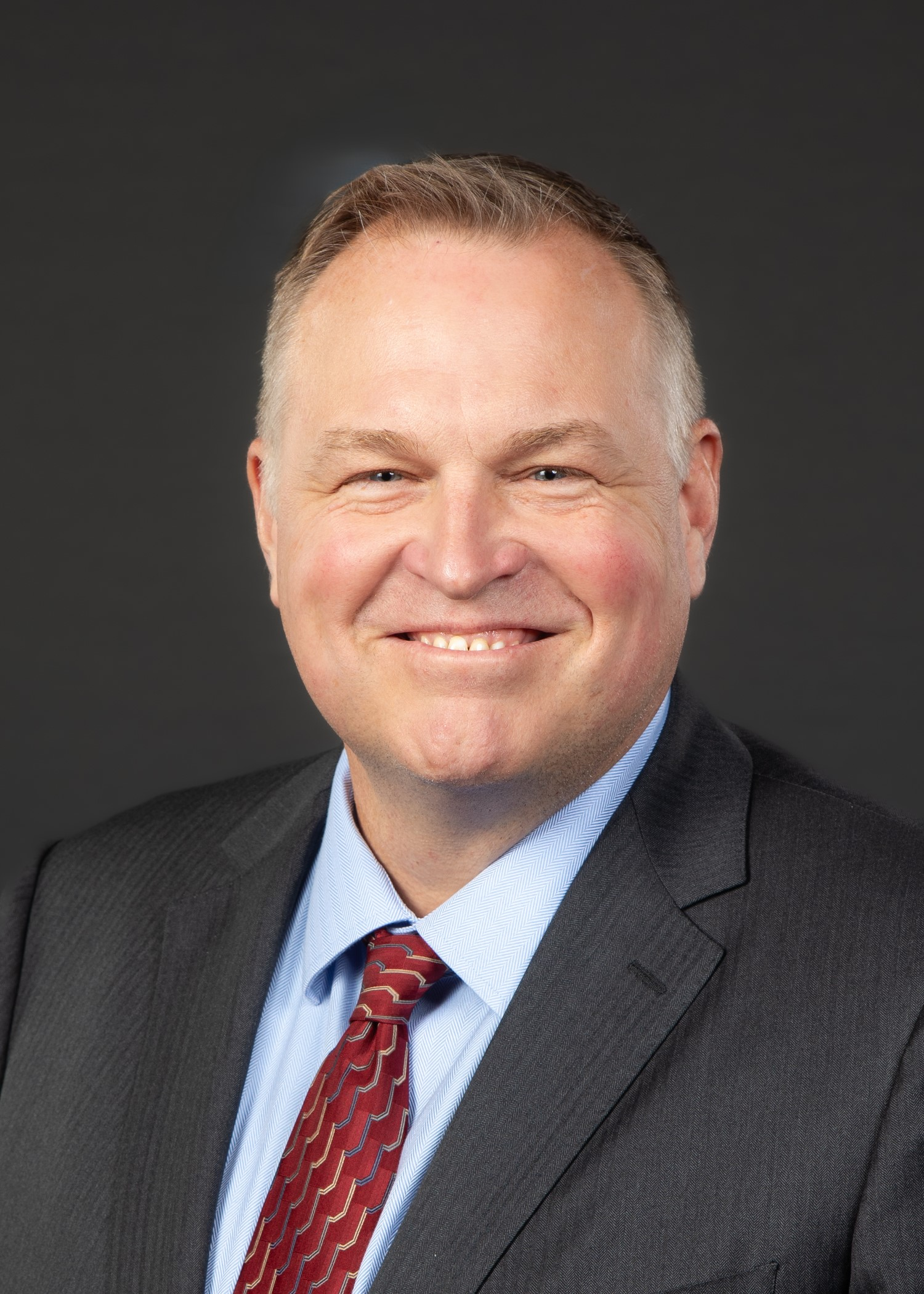

Member of the Iowa House of Representatives from the 91st district
- Incumbent
- Assumed office January 13, 2025
- Preceded by: Brad Sherman

Personal details
- Born: 1971 or 1972 (age 53–54) Iowa, U.S.
- Party: Republican
- Spouse: Ericka
- Children: 2

Judd C. Lawler (born 1971 or 1972) (Note: Per an article in The Gazette, Lawler was 52 years old on October 25, 2024.) also known by his nickname "Big Judd," is an American politician and lawyer.

== Early life and career ==
Lawler was born into a family of educators, and began attending school in the H-L-V Community School District. He earned a bachelor's degree in history at Yale University, followed by a Juris Doctor at the Georgetown University Law Center. Lawler became an assistant United States attorney before deciding to return to Iowa to raise a family. As his wife Ericka established her career as a hand surgeon and joined the University of Iowa's Carver College of Medicine as faculty, Lawler became a stay-at-home dad to two children.

== Political career ==
Lawler announced his candidacy for the Iowa House of Representatives in November 2023, and was endorsed by retiring legislator Brad Sherman in the 2024 Republican Party primary for District 91. He defeated Williamsburg mayor Adam Grier in the primary, and won the general election against Jay Gorsh. Lawler serves on the Appropriations, Commerce, and Government Oversight Committees, and is the vice chair of the Judiciary Committee.
