= Dave Heaton =

American politician (1941–2025)

David E. Heaton
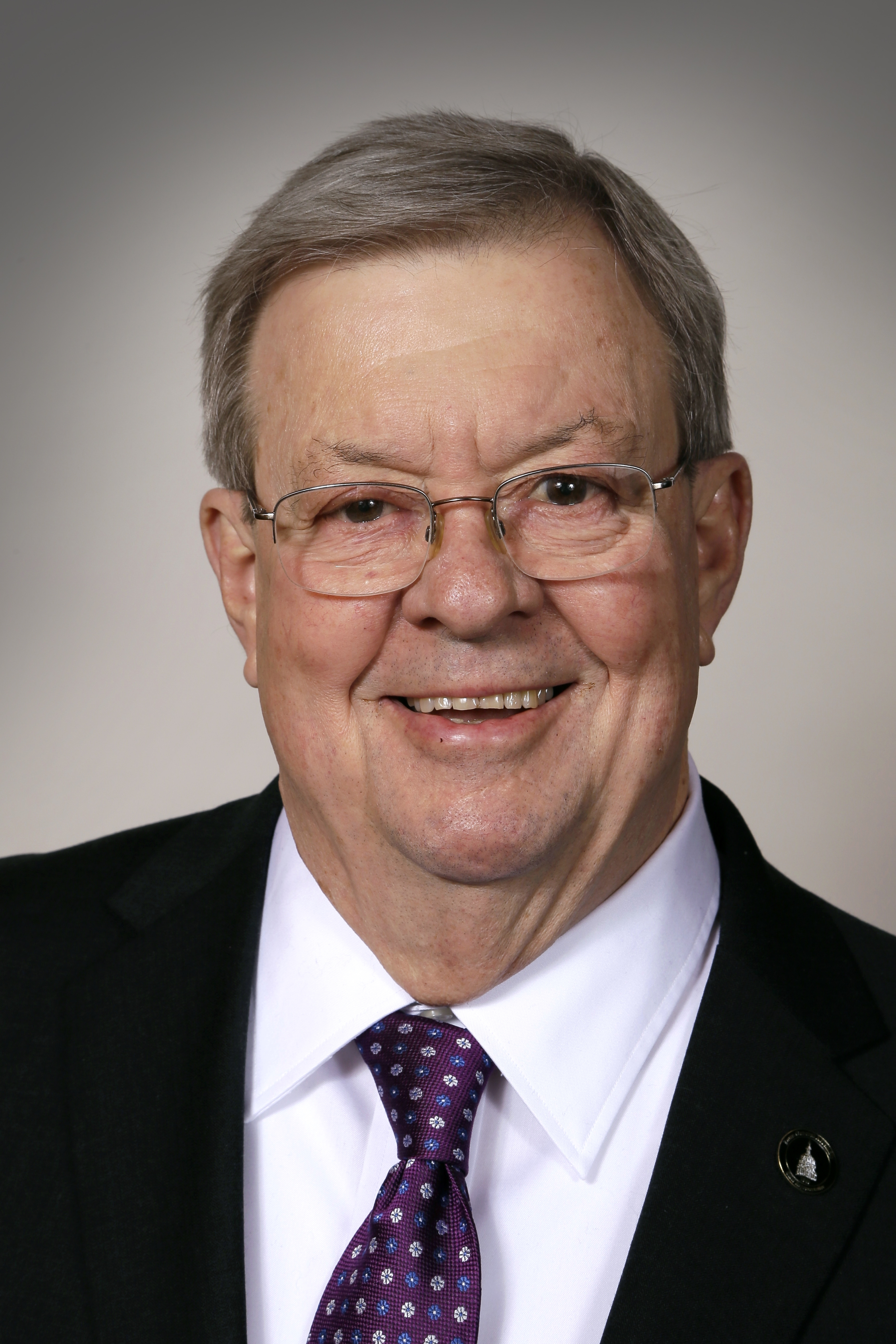

Member of the Iowa House of Representatives from the 84th district
- In office 2013–2019
- Preceded by: Ross Paustian
- Succeeded by: Joe Mitchell

Member of the Iowa House of Representatives from the 91st district
- In office 2003–2013
- Preceded by: Rich Arnold
- Succeeded by: Mark Lofgren

Member of the Iowa House of Representatives from the 97th district
- In office 1995–2003
- Preceded by: Gregory Spenner
- Succeeded by: Effie Boggess

Personal details
- Born: February 2, 1941 Sigourney, Iowa, U.S.
- Died: February 13, 2025 (aged 84) Mount Pleasant, Iowa, U.S.
- Party: Republican
- Spouse: Carmen
- Children: 2
- Education: Iowa Wesleyan College (BA)
- Website: Heaton's website

David Edward Heaton (February 2, 1941 – February 13, 2025) was an American politician who served as the Iowa State Representative from the 91st District, representing all of Henry County and the northern portion of Lee County. He sat in the Iowa House of Representatives from January 1995.

== Life and career ==
Born and raised in Sigourney, Iowa, he received his B.A. in history in 1964 from Iowa Wesleyan College in Mount Pleasant, Iowa, where he resided. For 40 years, he and his family owned and operated a popular restaurant operation, The Iris, located in Mount Pleasant. He and his wife, Carmen, are the parents of two grown children and have two grandchildren.

Heaton served on several committees in the Iowa House – the Appropriations committee; the Human Resources committee; and the Judiciary committee. He also served as the ranking member on the Health and Human Services Appropriations Subcommittee.

Heaton was re-elected in 2006 with 6,726 votes, running unopposed. He has faced some opposition since his first election in 1994, where he carried the district with nearly 70% of the popular vote. Heaton faced Ron Fedler, former small-town mayor and small business owner in 2008.

Heaton died in Mount Pleasant, Iowa on February 13, 2025, at the age of 84.

Iowa House of Representatives
Preceded by Gregory Spenner	Member of the Iowa House of Representatives from the 97th district 1995–2003	Succeeded by Effie Boggess
Preceded by Rich Arnold	Member of the Iowa House of Representatives from the 91st district 2003–2013	Succeeded by Mark Lofgren
Preceded by Ross Paustian	Member of the Iowa House of Representatives from the 84th district 2013–2019	Succeeded by Joe Mitchell
