= Julian Garrett =

American politician (1940–2026)

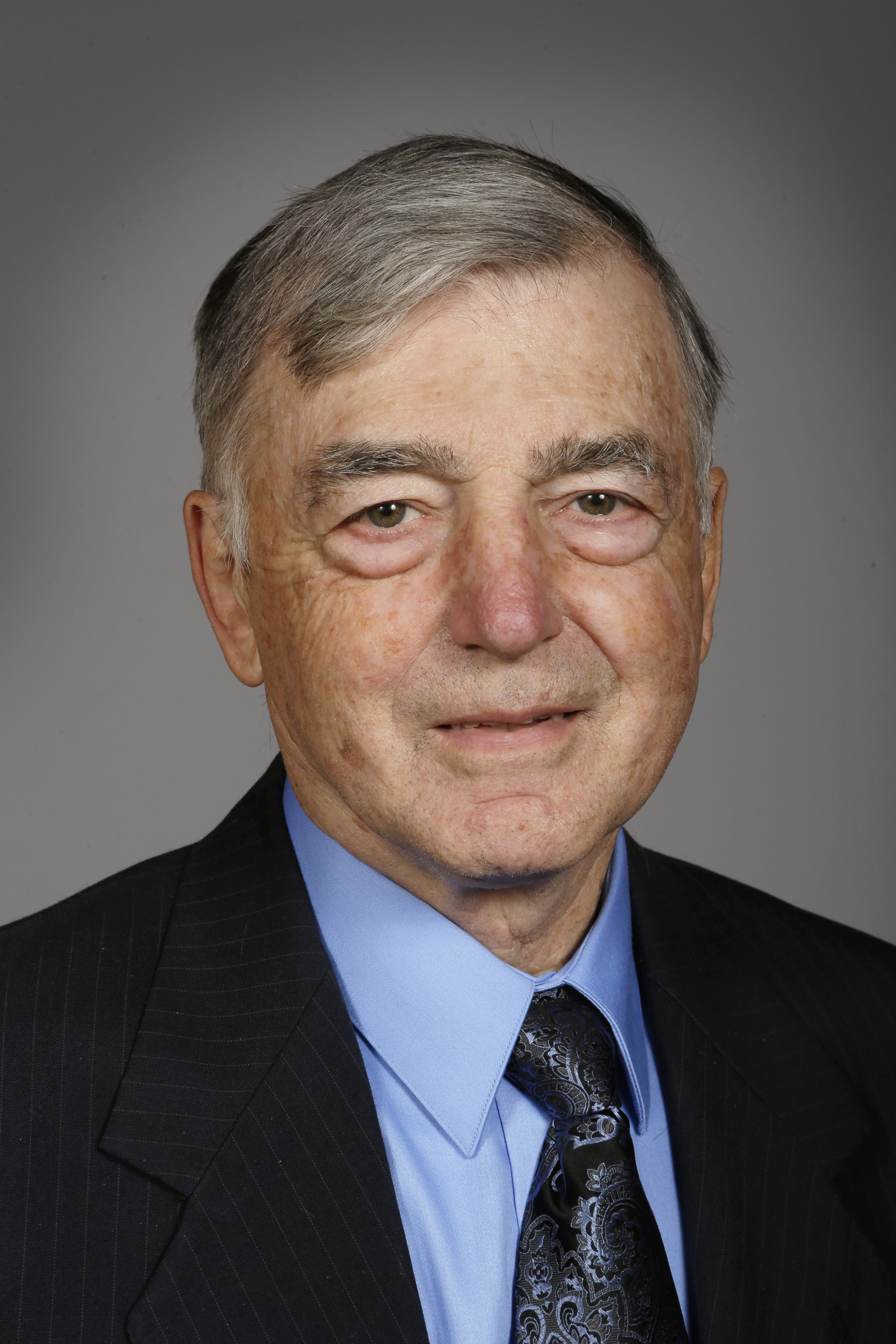

Member of the Iowa Senate from the 11th district
- In office November 25, 2013 – June 8, 2026
- Preceded by: Kent Sorenson
- Succeeded by: Vacant
- Constituency: 11th District – (2023–2026); 13th District – (2013–2023)

Member of the Iowa House of Representatives from the 73rd district
- In office January 10, 2011 – November 24, 2013
- Preceded by: Jodi Tymeson
- Succeeded by: Stan Gustafson

Personal details
- Born: November 7, 1940 Des Moines, Iowa, U.S.
- Died: June 8, 2026 (aged 85) Des Moines, Iowa, U.S.
- Party: Republican
- Spouse: Nancy
- Children: 3
- Education: Central College (BA); University of Iowa (JD)
- Profession: Attorney/farmer
- Website: Garrett's website]

Julian B. Garrett (November 7, 1940 – June 8, 2026) was an American lawyer and politician who was a Senator from the 11th district in the Iowa Senate.

== Life and career ==
Garrett served as a Republican in the Iowa House of Representatives as the Representative from the 73rd District from 2011 until 2013. In November 2013, Garrett was elected to the Iowa State Senate in a special election following the resignation of Kent Sorenson who pleaded guilty to obstruction of justice and other felonies related to campaign finances. Garrett was subsequently re-elected in 2014, 2018, and 2022. Garrett was born in Des Moines, Iowa, and resided in Indianola. He had a B.A. from Central College and a J.D. from the University of Iowa College of Law.

Garrett died in Des Moines June 8, 2026, at the age of 85.

== Electoral history ==
*incumbent

Election	Political result	Candidate	Party	Votes	%
Iowa House of Representatives primary elections, 2010; District 73; Turnout: 3,641	Republican	Julian B. Garrett	Republican	1,489	40.90%
Iowa House of Representatives primary elections, 2010; District 73; Turnout: 3,641	Republican	Roger D. Billings	Republican	1,053	28.92%
Iowa House of Representatives primary elections, 2010; District 73; Turnout: 3,641	Republican	Joan Acela	Republican	858	23.56%
Iowa House of Representatives general elections, 2010; District 73; Turnout: 14,447	Republican hold	Julian B. Garrett	Republican	8,826	64.45%
Iowa House of Representatives general elections, 2010; District 73; Turnout: 14,447	Republican hold	Tim Pierce	Democratic	4,851	35.47%
Iowa House of Representatives primary elections, 2012; District 25; Turnout: 1,608	Republican	Julian B. Garrett*	Republican	917	57.03%
Iowa House of Representatives primary elections, 2012; District 25; Turnout: 1,608	Republican	Joan Acela	Republican	651	40.49%
Iowa House of Representatives general elections, 2012; District 25; Turnout: 17,278	Republican (newly redistricted)	Julian B. Garrett*	Republican	9,082	54.81%
Iowa House of Representatives general elections, 2012; District 25; Turnout: 17,278	Republican (newly redistricted)	Katie Routh	Democratic	7,487	45,18%

Iowa Senate
Preceded by Tom Shipley	11th District; 2023–2026	Succeeded by Vacant
Preceded by Kent Sorenson	13th District; 2013–2023	Succeeded by Cherielynn Westrich
Iowa House of Representatives
Preceded by Jodi Tymeson	73rd District; 2011–2013	Succeeded by Stan Gustafson
