= Stan Gustafson =

American lawyer and politician

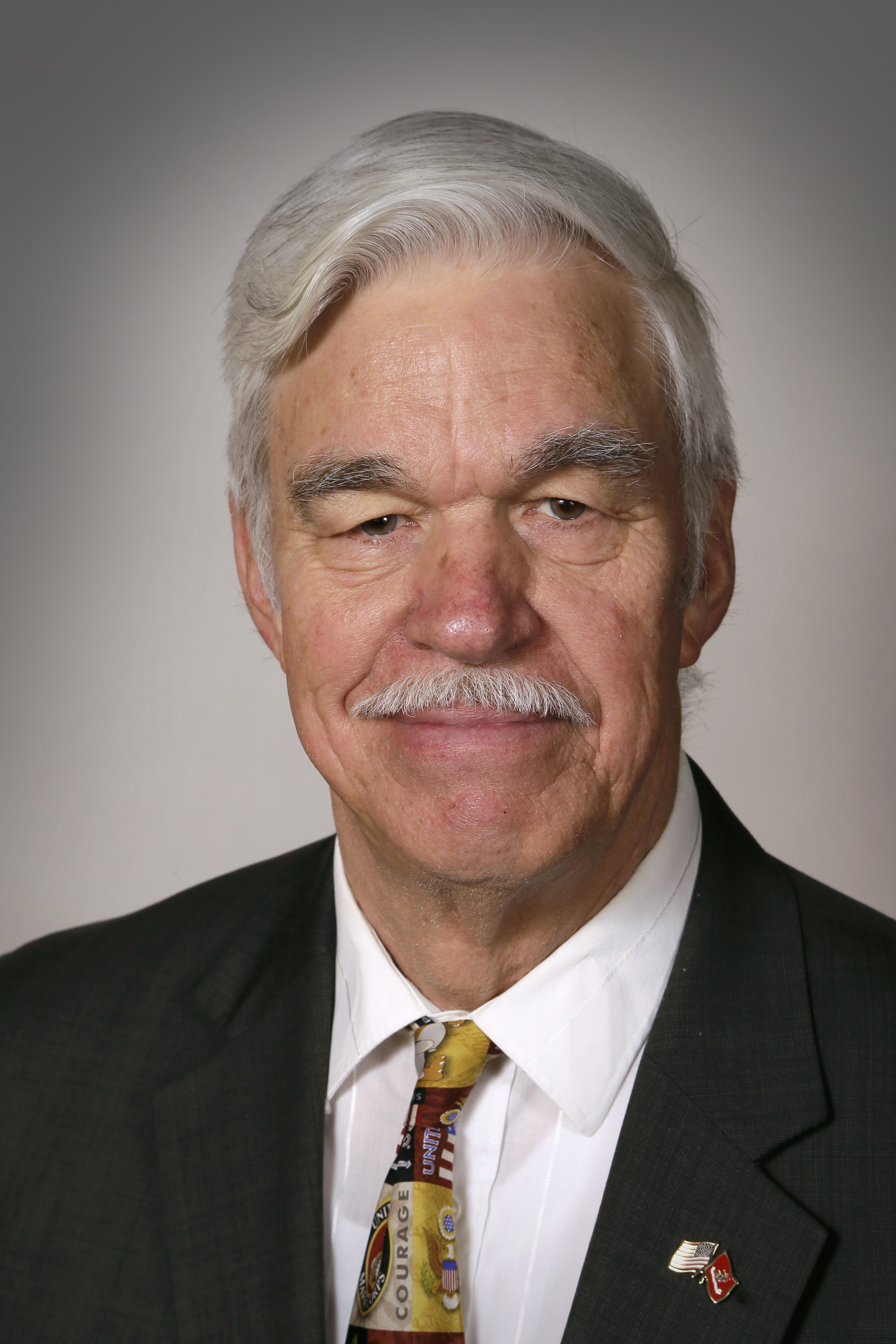
- 86th General Assembly portrait (2015)

Member of the Iowa House of Representatives from the 22nd district
- In office January 8, 2014 – January 13, 2025
- Preceded by: Julian Garrett
- Succeeded by: Samantha Fett

Personal details
- Born: May 7, 1942 (age 84) Washington, D.C., U.S.
- Party: Republican
- Spouse: Betty
- Children: 3
- Education: University of California at Berkeley; South Bay University School of Law
- Profession: Retired attorney
- Website: legis.iowa.gov/...

Stan Gustafson (born May 7, 1942) is an American lawyer and politician from the state of Iowa. A Republican, he served in the Iowa House of Representatives.

In August, 2005, Gustafson was recalled in a special election from the Los Osos Community Sewer District [CISD] due to a controversy over developing a new sewer system. After the recall of three members of the board (Stan Gustafson, President; Gordon Hensley, Member; Richard Le Gros, Member), the city of Los Osos defaulted on low interest loans from a state revolving fund and filed for Chapter 9 bankruptcy protection in federal court.

On January 7, 2014, Gustafson won a special election to succeed Julian Garrett in the Iowa House for the 25th district.

Gustafson was born in Washington, D.C. He served as a lieutenant colonel in the United States Marine Corps.

Iowa House of Representatives
| Preceded by Jon Jacobsen | 22nd District; 2023 – 2025 | Succeeded by Samantha Fett |
| Preceded by Julian Garrett | 22nd District; 2014 – 2023 | Succeeded by Hans Wilz |
