= 2022 United States Senate election in Iowa =

- November 8, 2022
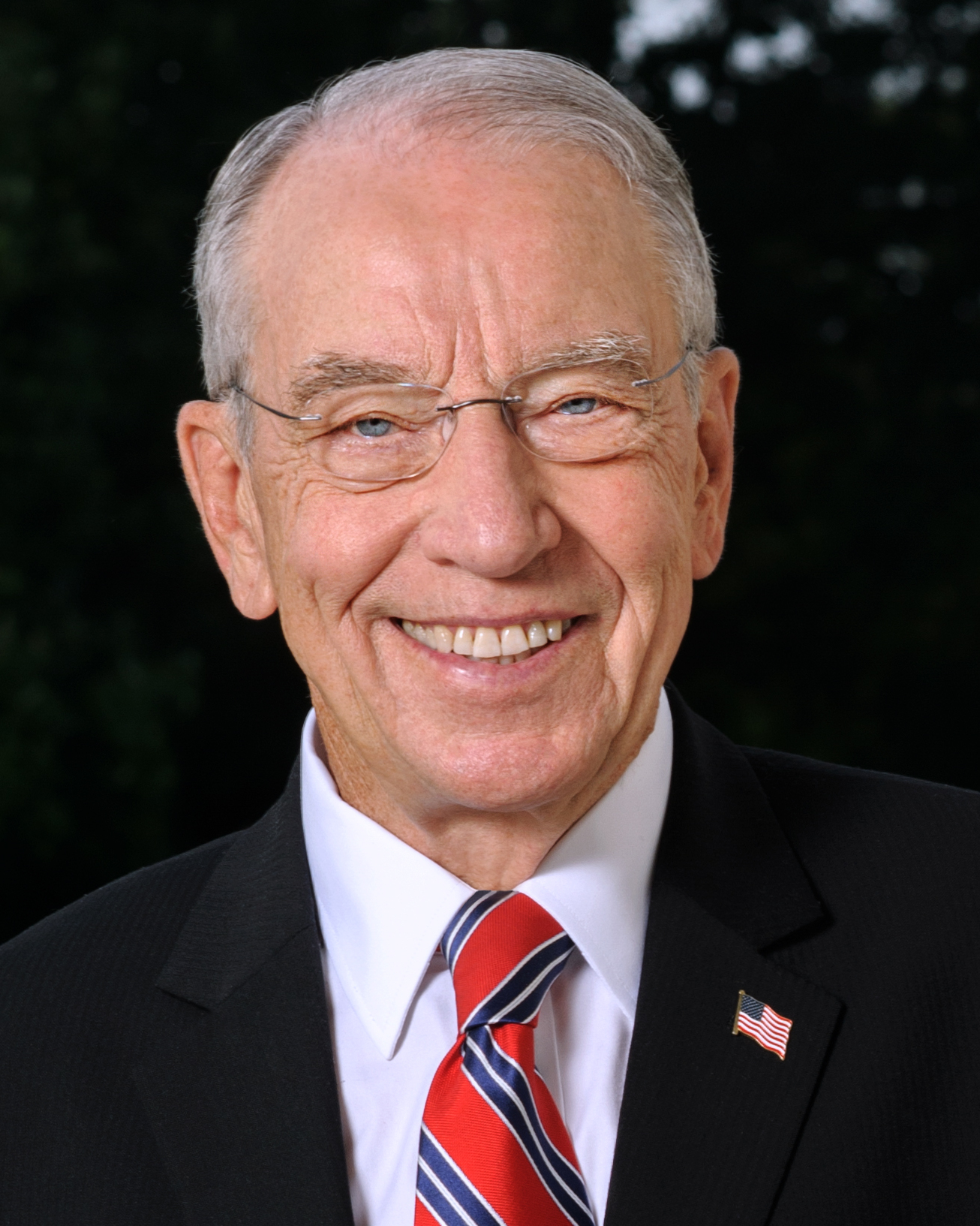

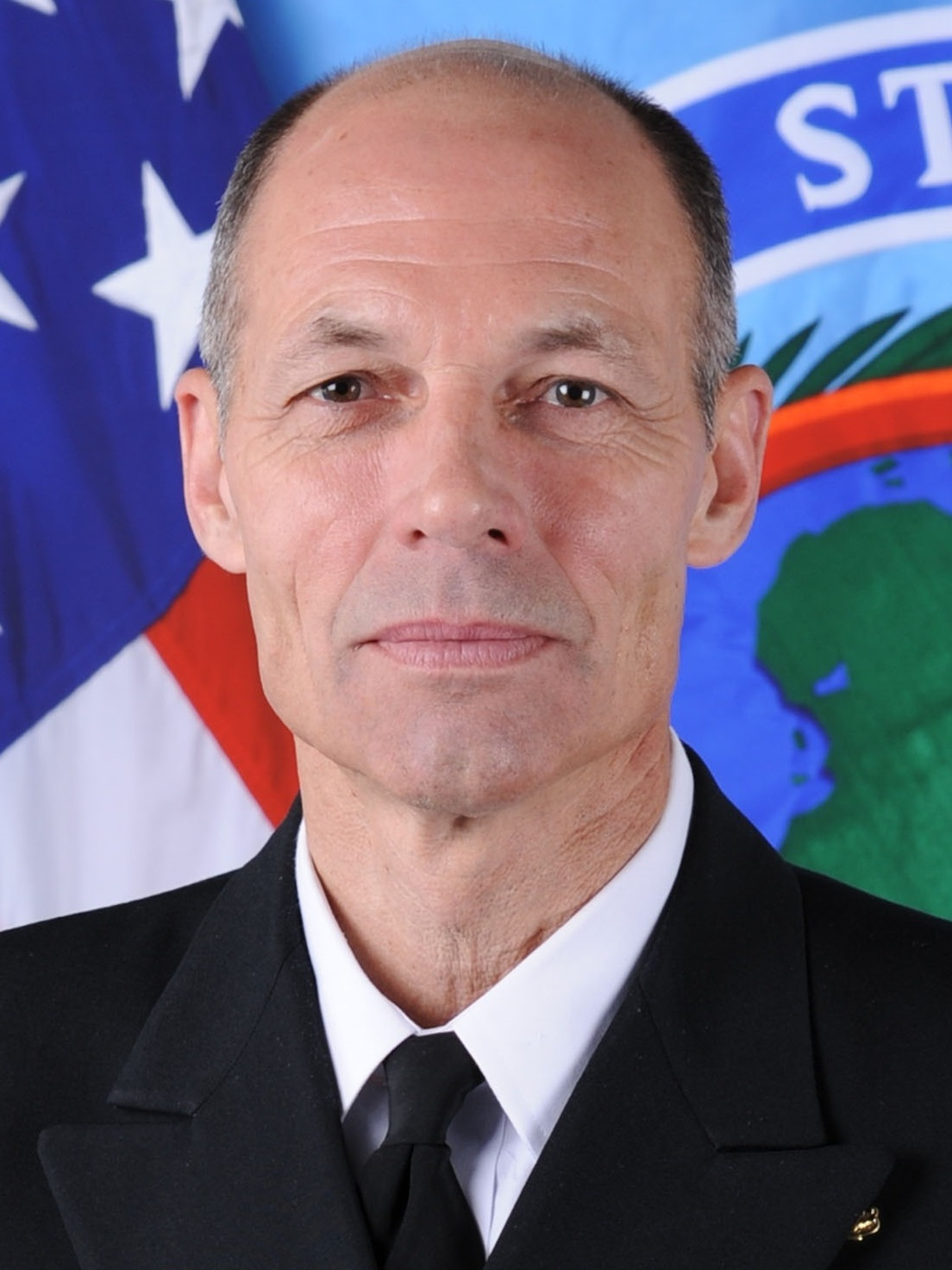
Nominee	Chuck Grassley	Michael Franken
Party	Republican	Democratic
Popular vote	681,501	533,330
Percentage	56.01%	43.84%
- Grassley: 40–50% 50–60% 60–70% 70–80% 80–90% >90% Franken: 50–60% 60–70% 70–80% 80–90% >90% Tie: 40–50%
U.S. senator before election
Chuck Grassley
Republican
Elected U.S. Senator
Chuck Grassley
Republican

The 2022 United States Senate election in Iowa was held on November 8, 2022, to elect a member of the United States Senate to represent the State of Iowa. Incumbent Republican Senator Chuck Grassley defeated Democratic nominee Michael Franken to win re-election to an eighth term.

Grassley was first elected in 1980 and was most recently re-elected in 2016. Grassley, who turned 89 years old on September 17, 2022, ran for reelection to an eighth term. With U.S. Senator Patrick Leahy retiring the same year, he became the second-oldest person ever to be re-elected for another term (behind Strom Thurmond in 1996 at age 93), on January 3, 2023, upon the departure of Patrick Leahy from the United States Senate Chuck Grassley became the most senior member in the Senate, and on January 4, 2023, he became the longest-serving Republican senator in history (overtaking Orrin Hatch), as well as the most senior member of Congress since January 3, 2023.

The Republican Party flipped Iowa's 3rd congressional district in the concurrent House election, thus marking the first time since 1957 that Iowa had an entirely Republican congressional delegation.

Despite his victory, this was Grassley's closest Senate race since he was first elected in 1980, as well as his worst performance since that time due to him not cracking 60% of the vote. Franken defeated Grassley in Linn, Story, and Polk counties, all of which Grassley won in every election since 1986. In addition, this election was the first time that Grassley lost Black Hawk County.

== Republican primary ==
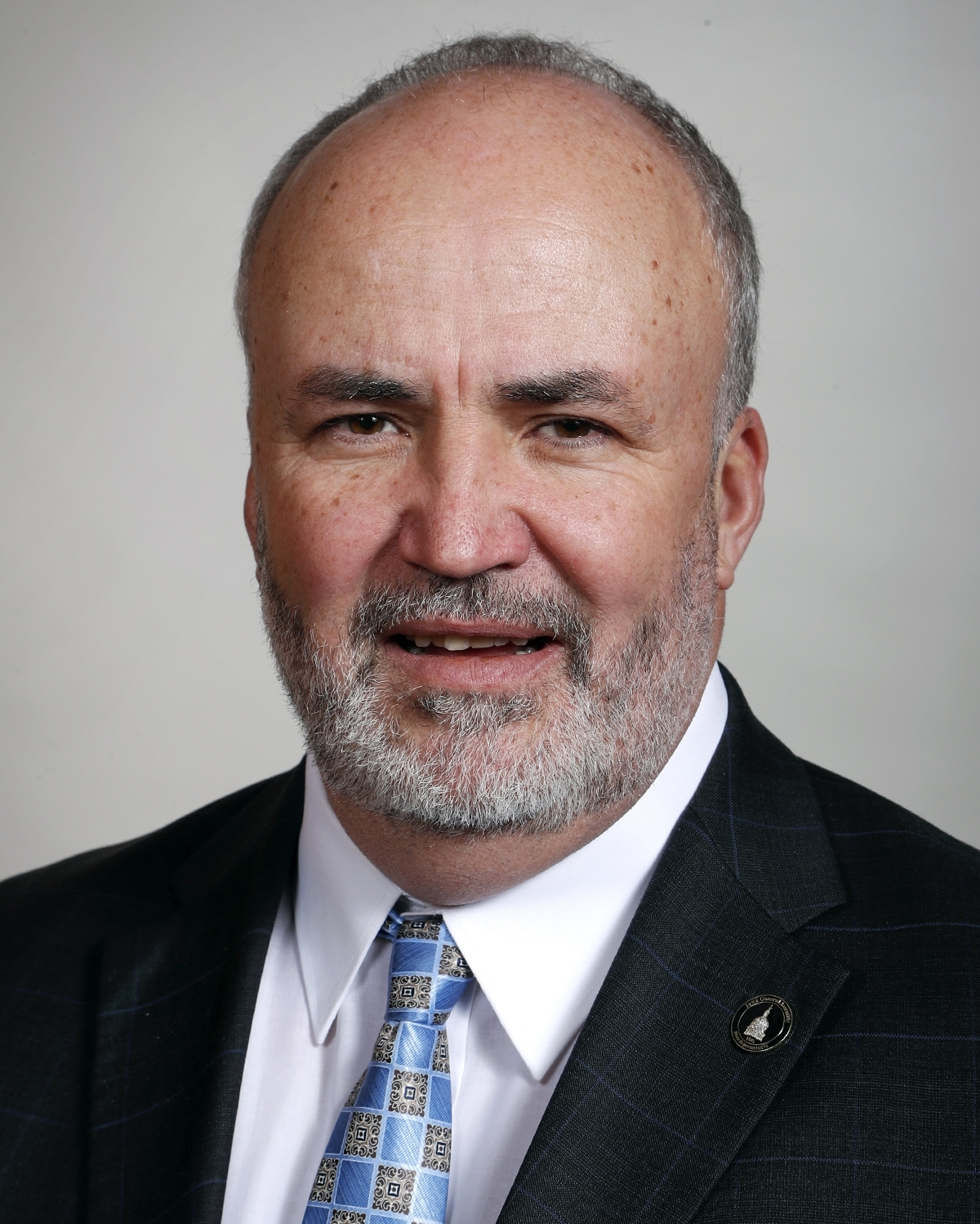
State Senator Jim Carlin challenged Grassley in the primary.

=== Candidates ===
==== Nominee ====
- Chuck Grassley, incumbent U.S. senator (1981–present) and president pro tempore emeritus

==== Eliminated in primary ====
- Jim Carlin, state senator from the 3rd district (2017–2023)

==== Declined ====
- Ashley Hinson, U.S. representative for Iowa's 1st congressional district (2021–2023) (ran for re-election; endorsed Grassley)
- Matthew Whitaker, former acting U.S. attorney general, former U.S. attorney for the Southern District of Iowa, and candidate for the U.S. Senate in 2014 (endorsed Grassley)

=== Fundraising ===
Candidate	Total receipts	Coverage ending
Chuck Grassley	$6,881,288	Coverage ending: May 18, 2022
Jim Carlin	$508,308	Coverage ending: May 18, 2022

=== Results ===
Results by county Grassley: 50–60%; 60–70%; 70–80%; 80–90%

Republican primary results
Party	Candidate	Votes	%
Republican	Chuck Grassley (incumbent)	143,634	73.34%
Republican	Jim Carlin	51,891	26.50%
Write-in		312	0.16%
Total votes		195,837	100.00%

== Democratic primary ==
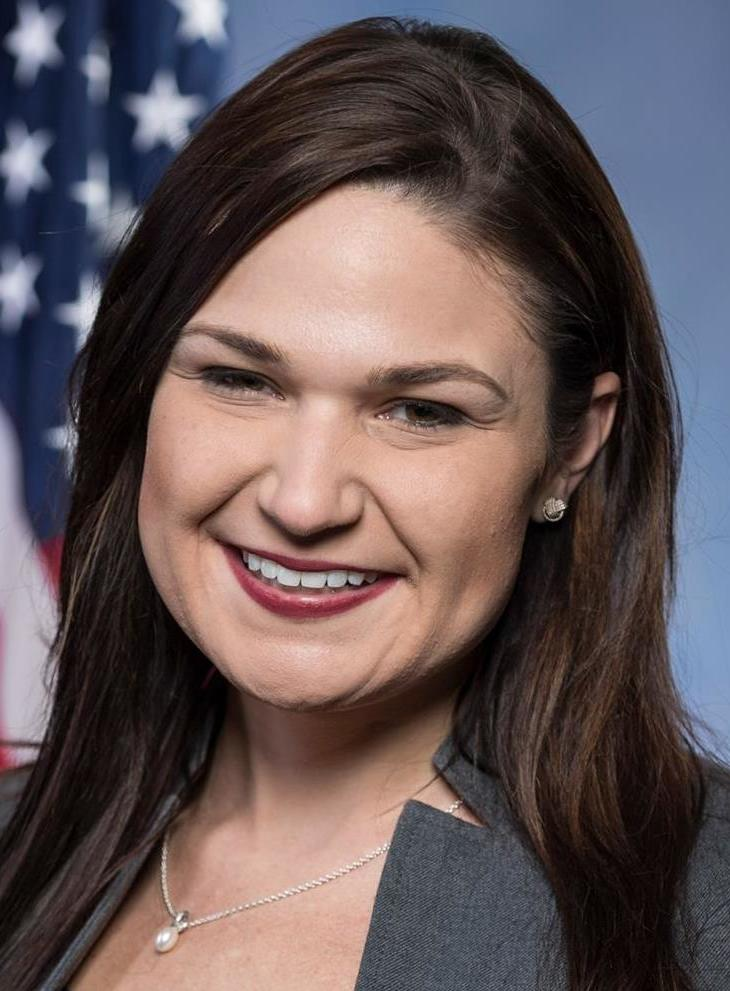
Former U.S. Representative Abby Finkenauer finished second in the primary.

=== Candidates ===
==== Nominee ====
- Michael Franken, retired U.S. Navy admiral, former aide to U.S. Senator Ted Kennedy, and candidate for U.S. Senate in 2020

==== Eliminated in primary ====
- Abby Finkenauer, former U.S. representative for Iowa's 1st congressional district (2019–2021)
- Glenn Hurst, Minden city councilor and chair of the Iowa Democratic Party Rural Caucus

==== Withdrew ====
- Bob Krause, former state representative (endorsed Franken)
- Dave Muhlbauer, former Crawford County supervisor (2017–2021) (endorsed Franken)

==== Declined ====
- Cindy Axne, U.S. representative for Iowa's 3rd congressional district (2019–2023) (ran for re-election; endorsed Finkenauer)
- Rob Sand, Iowa State Auditor (2019–present) (ran for reelection)
- J. D. Scholten, former paralegal, former professional baseball player and nominee for Iowa's 4th congressional district in 2018 and 2020 (ran for state house)

=== Campaign ===
Former U.S. Representative Abby Finkenauer was the original frontrunner in the Democratic primary, with her campaign being backed by several prominent politicians and labor unions, as well as the influential political action committee EMILY's List. However, in an upset, retired vice-admiral Michael Franken managed to slowly overtake her as the perceived frontrunner, assisted by an effective campaign that highlighted his leadership credentials.

=== Fundraising ===
Candidate	Total receipts	Coverage ending
Abby Finkenauer	$3,740,881	Coverage ending: May 18, 2022
Michael Franken	$2,863,882	Coverage ending: May 18, 2022
Glenn Hurst	$129,618	Coverage ending: May 18, 2022

=== Endorsements ===
Abby Finkenauer

U.S. representatives

- Cindy Axne, U.S. representative for Iowa's 3rd congressional district (2019–2023)
- Dave Loebsack, former U.S. representative for Iowa's 2nd congressional district (2007–2021)

State officials

- Michael Fitzgerald, treasurer of Iowa (1983–2023)

State legislators

- Janet Petersen, state senator

Labor unions

- American Federation of Government Employees
- International Association of Sheet Metal, Air, Rail and Transportation Workers
- International Brotherhood of Teamsters
- Iowa Professional Fire Fighters Association
- United Steelworkers

Organizations

- EMILY's List
- Feminist Majority PAC
- Giffords
- League of Conservation Voters
Glenn Hurst

Organizations

- Iowa Citizens for Community Improvement

Individuals

- Marianne Williamson, author and candidate for the Democratic nomination for president of the United States in 2020

=== Polling ===
Graphical summary

View source data.

Poll source	Date(s) administered	Sample size (Note: Key: A – all adults RV – registered voters LV – likely voters V – unclear)	Margin of error	Abby Finkenauer	Michael Franken	Glenn Hurst	Undecided
Change Research (D) (Note: Poll sponsored by Franken's campaign)	May 4–8, 2022	866 (LV)	± 4.0%	40%	42%	4%	14%
Change Research (D)	April 6–11, 2022	416 (LV)	± 6.3%	53%	26%	7%	14%
GBAO (D) (Note: Poll sponsored by Finkenauer's campaign)	March 30 – April 3, 2022	600 (LV)	± 4.0%	64%	15%	6%	15%

=== Results ===
Results by county Franken: 40–50%; 50–60%; 60–70%; 70–80%; Finkenauer: 40–50%; 50–60%; 60–70%

Democratic primary results
Party	Candidate	Votes	%
Democratic	Michael Franken	86,527	55.17%
Democratic	Abby Finkenauer	62,581	39.90%
Democratic	Glenn Hurst	7,571	4.83%
Write-in		158	0.10%
Total votes		156,837	100.00%

== General election ==
=== Predictions ===
Source	Ranking	As of
The Cook Political Report	Solid R	November 7, 2022
Inside Elections	Solid R	August 25, 2022
Sabato's Crystal Ball	Safe R	August 31, 2022
Politico	Likely R	October 18, 2022
RCP	Likely R	October 15, 2022
Fox News	Likely R	August 22, 2022
DDHQ	Solid R	July 20, 2022
538	Solid R	September 6, 2022
The Economist	Safe R	September 7, 2022

=== Debates ===
2022 United States Senate general election in Iowa debates
No.	Date	Host	Moderator	Link	Republican	Democratic
P Participant A Absent N Non-invitee I Invitee W Withdrawn						
P Participant A Absent N Non-invitee I Invitee W Withdrawn					Chuck Grassley	Michael Franken
1	October 6, 2022	Iowa PBS	O. Kay Henderson		P	P

=== Endorsements ===
Chuck Grassley (R)

U.S. executive branch officials

- Max Baucus, former U.S. ambassador to China and former U.S. senator from Montana (Democrat)
- Terry Branstad, former U.S. ambassador to China and former governor of Iowa
- Bill Northey, former Under Secretary of Agriculture for Farm Production and Conservation and former Secretary of Agriculture of Iowa
- Mike Pence, 48th vice president of the United States (2017–2021) and former governor of Indiana
- Mike Pompeo, United States secretary of state (2018–2021)
- Donald Trump, 45th president of the United States (2017–2021)
- Matthew Whitaker, former acting United States attorney general

U.S. senators

- Marsha Blackburn, U.S. senator from Tennessee (2019–present)
- Ted Cruz, U.S. senator from Texas (2013–present)
- Joni Ernst, U.S. senator from Iowa (2015–present)
- Tim Scott, U.S. senator from South Carolina (2013–present)

U.S. representatives

- Randy Feenstra, U.S. representative for Iowa's 4th congressional district (2021–present)
- Tulsi Gabbard, former U.S. representative from Hawaii's 2nd congressional district (2013–2021) and former vice chair of the Democratic National Committee (2013–2016) (Independent)
- Ashley Hinson, U.S. representative for Iowa's 1st congressional district (2021–2023)
- Mariannette Miller-Meeks, U.S. representative for Iowa's 2nd congressional district (2021–2023)
- Elise Stefanik, former chair of the House Republican Conference (2021–present) and U.S. representative for New York's 21st congressional district (2015–present)
- David Young, U.S. representative for Iowa's 3rd congressional district (2015–2019)

State officials

- Adam Gregg, lieutenant governor of Iowa (2017–2024)
- Evan Hultman, attorney general of Iowa (1961–1965)
- Mike Naig, Secretary of Agriculture of Iowa (2018–present)
- Paul Pate, Secretary of State of Iowa (2015–present, 1995–1999)
- Kim Reynolds, governor of Iowa (2017–present)

State legislators

- Robert Bacon, state representative for the 48th district (2013–2023)
- Michael Bergan, state representative for the 55th district (2017–present)
- Brian Best, state representative for the 12th district (2015–2025)
- Jane Bloomingdale, state representative for the 51st district (2017–present)
- Jacob Bossman, state representative for the 6th district (2018–present)
- Mike Bousselot, state representative for the 37th district (2021–2023)
- Steve Bradley, state representative for the 58th district (2021–present)
- Holly Brink, state representative for the 80th district (2019–2023)
- Dennis Bush, state representative for the 3rd district (2021–2023)
- Dave Deyoe, state representative for the 49th district (2013–2025) and the 10th district (2007–2013)
- Cecil Dolecheck, state representative for the 24th district (2013–2023), the 96th district (2003–2013) and the 88th district (1997–2003)
- Jon Dunwell, state representative for the 29th district (2021–present)
- Dean Fisher, state representative for the 72nd district (2013–present)
- Joel Fry, state representative for the 11th district (2013–2025) and the 52nd district (2011–2013)
- Thomas Gerhold, state representative for the 75th district (2019–present)
- Garrett Gobble, state representative for the 38th district (2021–2023)
- Martin Graber, state representative for the 84th district (2021–2025)
- Pat Grassley, Speaker of the Iowa House of Representatives (2020–present) and state representative for the 50th district (2013–present) the 17th district (2007–2013) (Chuck Grassley's grandson)
- Stan Gustafson, state representative for the 25th district (2014–2025)
- Lee Hein, state representative for the 96th district (2011–present)
- Dustin Hite, state representative for the 79th district (2019–2023)
- Steven Holt, state representative for the 18th district (2015–present)
- Chad Ingels, state representative for the 64th district (2021–present)
- Thomas Jeneary, state representative for the 5th district (2019–2023)
- Megan Jones, state representative for the 2nd district (2013–present)
- Bobby Kaufmann, state representative for the 73rd district (2017–present)
- David Kerr, state representative for the 88th district (2017–2023)
- Jarad Klein, state representative for the 78th district (2013–2023) and the 89th district (2011–2013)
- Shannon Latham, state representative for the 54th district (2021–present)
- Brian Lohse, state representative for the 30th district (2019–present)
- Shannon Lundgren, state representative for the 57th district (2019–present)
- David Maxwell, state representative for the 76th district (2013–2023)
- Charlie McClintock, state representative for the 95th district (2021–2023)
- Ann Meyer, state representative for the 9th district (2019–present)
- Joe Mitchell, state representative for the 84th district (2019–2023)
- Gary Mohr, state representative for the 94th district (2017–present)
- Norlin Mommsen, state representative for the 97th district (2015–present)
- Thomas Moore, state representative for the 21st district (2015–present)
- Carter Nordman, state representative for the 19th district (2021–present)
- Ross Paustian, state representative for the 92nd district (2015–2023) and the 84th district (2011–2013)
- Mike Sexton, state representative for the 10th district (2015–2025)
- Brent Siegrist, state representative for the 16th district (2021–present), the 84th district (1993–2003) and the 99th district (1985–1993) and Speaker of the Iowa House of Representatives (1999–2003)
- Ray Sorensen, state representative for the 20th district (2019–present)
- Henry Stone, state representative for the 7th district (2021–present)
- Phil Thompson, state representative for the 47th district (2019–2025)
- Jon Thorup, state representative for the 28th district (2019–2023)
- John Wills, speaker pro tempore of the Iowa House of Representatives (2020–present) and State Representative for the 1st district (2015–present)
- Matt Windschitl, majority leader of the Iowa House of Representatives (2020–2025), state representative for the 17th district (2015–present) and speaker pro tempore of the Iowa House of Representatives (2014–2020)
- Gary Worthan, state representative for the 11th district (2013–2023) and the 52nd district (2007–2013)

Individuals

- Bob Vander Plaats, political activist

Newspapers

- Telegraph Herald

Organization

- American Israel Public Affairs Committee
- BIPAC
- Campaign for Working Families
- Citizens for Responsible Energy Solutions
- Home School Legal Defense Association
- Huck PAC
- National Federation of Independent Business
- National Republican Senatorial Committee
- National Rifle Association - Political Victory Fund
- National Right to Life Committee
- Pro-Israel America
- Susan B. Anthony Pro-Life America
- Tea Party Express
- United States Chamber of Commerce
Michael Franken (D)

U.S. senators

- Doug Jones, former U.S. senator from Alabama (2018–2021)

U.S. representatives

- Jim Leach, former U.S. representative for Iowa's 1st congressional district (1977–2007)
- Dave Nagle, former U.S. representative from Iowa's 3rd congressional district (1987–1993)

State officials

- Bonnie Campbell, former attorney general of Iowa (1991–1995) and director of the Office on Violence Against Women (1995–2001)
- Patty Judge, former lieutenant governor of Iowa (2007–2011) Secretary of Agriculture of Iowa (1999–2007) and nominee for U.S. Senate in 2016

State legislators

- Daryl Beall, former state representative
- Timi Brown-Powers, state representative
- Thomas G. Courtney, former state representative
- Bill Dotzler, assistant minority leader of the Iowa Senate
- John Forbes, state representative
- Steve Hansen, state representative
- David Jacoby, state representative
- Tim Kacena, former state representative
- Anesa Kajtazović, former state representative
- Kevin Kinney, state senator
- Bob Krause, former state representative
- Bob Kressig, state representative
- Jean Hall Lloyd-Jones, former state senator
- Mary Mascher, state representative
- Andy McKean, former state representative
- Brian Meyer, state representative
- Amy Nielsen, state representative
- Scott Ourth, former state representative
- Herman Quirmbach, state senator
- Jackie Smith, state senator
- Art Staed, state representative
- Sharon Steckman, state representative
- Beth Wessel-Kroeschell, state representative
- Dave Williams, state representative
- Philip Wise, former state representative

Local officials

- Joel Miller, Linn County auditor and Democratic nominee for Secretary of State of Iowa in 2022
- Bob Scott, mayor of Sioux City (2012–present, 1990–1998)
- Tony Thompson, sheriff of Black Hawk County

Labor unions

- Laborers' International Union of North America
- National Education Association

Newspaper and other media

- The Gazette
- Iowa City Press-Citizen
- KXRA (AM)
- Sioux City Journal
- Storm Lake Times

Organizations

- 314 Action
- Brady Campaign
- End Citizens United
- Iowa Unity Coalition
- Jewish Dems
- League of Conservation Voters
- Let America Vote
- Sierra Club
- The Steady State
- VoteVets.org

Individuals

- Alexander Vindman, retired lieutenant colonel and witness during the first impeachment trial of Donald Trump

=== Polling ===
Aggregate polls

Source of poll aggregation	Dates administered	Dates updated	Chuck Grassley (R)	Michael Franken (D)	Undecided (Note: Calculated by taking the difference of 100% and all other candidates combined.)	Margin
FiveThirtyEight	October 2 – November 8, 2022	November 8, 2022	51.8%	42.2%	6.0%	Grassley +9.6
270towin	October 26 – November 5, 2022	November 8, 2022	53.0%	42.7%	4.3%	Grassley +10.3
Average			52.4%	42.5%	5.1%	Grassley +9.9

Graphical summary

View source data.

Poll source	Date(s) administered	Sample size	Margin of error	Chuck Grassley (R)	Michael Franken (D)	Other	Undecided
Selzer & Co.	October 31 – November 3, 2022	801 (LV)	± 3.5%	53%	41%	4% (Note: "Someone else" with 3%; "Don't want to tell" with 1%)	2%
Cygnal (R) (Note: Poll sponsored by the Iowans for Tax Relief Foundation)	October 26–27, 2022	600 (LV)	± 4.0%	54%	43%	–	3%
Civiqs	October 22–25, 2022	623 (LV)	± 5.2%	52%	44%	3% (Note: "Someone else" with 3%)	2%
The Tarrance Group (R) (Note: Poll conducted for the NRSC.)	October 15–19, 2022	600 (LV)	± 4.1%	53%	42%	–	4%
Change Research (D)	October 14–18, 2022	1,008 (LV)	± 3.3%	48%	45%	–	6%
Selzer & Co.	October 9–12, 2022	620 (LV)	± 3.9%	46%	43%	8% (Note: "Someone else" with 4%; "Would not vote" with 4%)	3%
Emerson College	October 2–4, 2022	959 (LV)	± 3.1%	49%	38%	4%	9%
Cygnal (R)	October 2–4, 2022	600 (LV)	± 4.0%	54%	40%	–	6%
Change Research (D)	September 3–8, 2022	1,143 (LV)	± 3.0%	48%	44%	–	8%
Cygnal (R)	July 13–14, 2022	600 (LV)	± 4.0%	52%	43%	–	5%
Selzer & Co.	July 10–13, 2022	597 (LV)	± 4.0%	47%	39%	7%	5%
Change Research (D)	June 30 – July 4, 2022	1,488 (LV)	± 2.7%	49%	44%	–	7%
Change Research (D)	April 6–11, 2022	1,070 (LV)	± 4.0%	45%	42%	–	13%

Hypothetical polling

Chuck Grassley vs. Abby Finkenauer

Poll source	Date(s) administered	Sample size	Margin of error	Chuck Grassley (R)	Abby Finkenauer (D)	Other	Undecided
Moore Information Group (R)	March 8–13, 2022	400 (LV)	± 5.0%	45%	36%	6%	14%
Cygnal (R)	February 20–22, 2022	610 (LV)	± 3.9%	53%	39%	–	8%
Data for Progress (D)	December 2–13, 2021	770 (LV)	± 4.0%	53%	39%	–	8%
Cygnal (R)	October 18–19, 2021	600 (LV)	± 4.0%	55%	39%	–	6%
Selzer & Co.	September 12–15, 2021	620 (LV)	± 3.9%	55%	37%	1% (Note: "Would not vote" (volunteered answer) with 1%)	7%

=== Results ===
2022 United States Senate election in Iowa
Party	Candidate	Votes	%	±%
Republican	Chuck Grassley (incumbent)	681,501	56.01%	−4.08%
Democratic	Michael Franken	533,330	43.84%	+8.18%
Write-in		1,815	0.15%	+0.04%
Total votes		1,216,646	100.00%	N/A
Republican hold				

==== By county ====
County	Chuck Grassley Republican		Michael Franken Democratic		Write-ins		Margin		Total
County	#	%	#	%	#	%	#	%	Total
Adair	2,279	71.9%	887	28.0%	3	0.1%	1,392	43.9%	3,169
Adams	1,167	71.3%	467	28.5%	3	0.2%	700	42.8%	1,637
Allamakee	3,806	66.3%	1,934	33.7%	2	0.0%	1,872	32.6%	5,742
Appanoose	3,357	71.3%	1,349	28.6%	5	0.1%	2,008	42.7%	4,711
Audubon	1,661	68.5%	760	31.3%	4	0.2%	901	37.2%	2,425
Benton	7,502	66.1%	3,823	33.7%	21	0.2%	3,679	32.4%	11,346
Black Hawk	23,133	49.0%	24,036	50.9%	54	0.1%	-903	-1.9%	47,223
Boone	6,456	58.2%	4,618	41.6%	20	0.2%	1,838	16.6%	11,094
Bremer	6,641	60.4%	4,345	39.5%	6	0.1%	2,296	20.9%	10,992
Buchanan	5,085	62.3%	3,071	37.6%	10	0.1%	2,014	24.7%	8,166
Buena Vista	3,530	69.9%	1,518	30.0%	5	0.1%	2,012	39.9%	5,053
Butler	4,334	72.1%	1,669	27.8%	6	0.1%	2,665	44.3%	6,009
Calhoun	2,853	73.4%	1,027	26.4%	6	0.2%	1,826	47.0%	3,886
Carroll	5,773	71.2%	2,327	28.7%	10	0.1%	3,446	42.5%	8,110
Cass	3,698	71.0%	1,502	28.8%	9	0.2%	2,196	42.2%	5,209
Cedar	4,806	60.7%	3,106	39.2%	5	0.1%	1,700	21.5%	7,917
Cerro Gordo	9,260	54.7%	7,644	45.2%	23	0.1%	1,616	9.5%	16,927
Cherokee	3,338	74.2%	1,159	25.8%	3	0.1%	2,179	48.4%	4,500
Chickasaw	3,276	66.2%	1,665	33.7%	4	0.1%	1,611	32.5%	4,945
Clarke	2,332	69.8%	1,005	30.1%	6	0.2%	1,327	39.7%	3,343
Clay	4,578	71.7%	1,795	28.1%	10	0.2%	2,783	43.6%	6,383
Clayton	4,839	65.7%	2,512	34.1%	9	0.1%	2,327	31.6%	7,360
Clinton	9,595	57.0%	7,213	42.9%	15	0.1%	2,382	14.1%	16,823
Crawford	3,289	74.9%	1,101	25.1%	4	0.1%	2,188	49.8%	4,394
Dallas	23,286	52.8%	20,757	47.1%	60	0.1%	2,529	5.7%	44,103
Davis	22,06	74.2%	764	25.7%	3	0.1%	1,442	48.5%	2,973
Decatur	1,944	70.8%	794	28.9%	7	0.3%	1,150	41.9%	2,745
Delaware	5,423	71.0%	2,210	28.9%	6	0.1%	3,213	42.1%	7,639
Des Moines	7,353	55.7%	5,836	44.2%	17	0.1%	1,517	11.5%	13,206
Dickinson	5,821	70.3%	2,459	29.7%	6	0.1%	3,362	40.6%	8,286
Dubuque	20,762	53.5%	18,020	46.4%	41	0.1%	2,742	7.1%	38,823
Emmet	2,391	71.8%	935	28.1%	2	0.1%	1,456	43.7%	3,328
Fayette	4,784	63.5%	2,744	36.4%	8	0.1%	2,040	27.1%	7,536
Floyd	3,465	60.6%	2,247	39.3%	5	0.1%	1,218	21.3%	5,717
Franklin	2,558	71.3%	1,025	28.6%	5	0.1%	1,533	42.7%	3,588
Fremont	1,861	71.6%	735	28.3%	4	0.2%	1,126	43.3%	2,600
Greene	2,340	65.6%	1,218	34.1%	11	0.3%	1,122	31.5%	3,569
Grundy	3,909	72.7%	1,462	27.2%	7	0.1%	2,447	45.5%	5,378
Guthrie	3,448	68.8%	1,549	30.9%	16	0.3%	1,899	37.9%	5,013
Hamilton	3,757	65.8%	1,945	34.1%	5	0.1%	1,812	31.7%	5,707
Hancock	3,148	72.4%	1,194	27.4%	8	0.2%	1,954	45.0%	4,350
Hardin	4,539	68.9%	2,044	31.0%	8	0.1%	2,495	37.9%	6,591
Harrison	3,889	71.2%	1,548	28.3%	26	0.5%	2,341	42.9%	5,463
Henry	4,602	67.0%	2,261	32.9%	7	0.1%	2,341	34.1%	6,870
Howard	2,126	63.4%	1,221	36.4%	6	0.2%	905	27.0%	3,353
Humboldt	2,896	75.6%	931	24.3%	3	0.1%	1,965	51.3%	3,830
Ida	2,130	78.1%	588	21.6%	8	0.3%	1,542	56.5%	2,726
Iowa	4,803	65.3%	2,539	34.5%	15	0.2%	2,264	30.8%	7,357
Jackson	4,816	63.0%	2,816	36.9%	7	0.1%	2,000	26.1%	7,639
Jasper	9,298	62.1%	5,658	37.8%	23	0.2%	3,640	24.3%	14,979
Jefferson	3,263	50.3%	3,214	49.5%	12	0.2%	49	0.8%	6,489
Johnson	18,245	28.6%	45,416	71.3%	62	0.1%	-27,171	-42.7%	63,723
Jones	5,118	62.6%	3,041	37.2%	14	0.2%	2,077	25.4%	8,173
Keokuk	2,811	74.6%	949	25.2%	6	0.2%	1,862	49.4%	3,766
Kossuth	4,781	71.2%	1,925	28.7%	9	0.1%	2,856	42.5%	6,715
Lee	6,964	60.8%	4,476	39.1%	13	0.1%	2,488	21.7%	11,453
Linn	42,551	45.4%	51,008	54.4%	123	0.2%	-8,457	-9.0%	93,682
Louisa	2,441	70.1%	1,038	29.8%	3	0.1%	1,403	40.3%	3,482
Lucas	2,513	72.6%	937	27.1%	10	0.3%	1,576	45.5%	3,460
Lyon	4,277	86.6%	662	13.4%	1	0.0%	3,615	73.2%	4,940
Madison	5,064	67.7%	2,405	32.1%	16	0.2%	2,659	35.6%	7,485
Mahaska	6,049	75.7%	1,936	24.2%	8	0.1%	4,113	51.5%	7,993
Marion	9,799	69.2%	4,341	30.7%	20	0.1%	5,458	38.5%	14,160
Marshall	7,307	59.0%	5,060	40.9%	16	0.1%	2,247	18.1%	12,383
Mills	3,937	70.3%	1,654	29.5%	11	0.2%	2,283	40.8%	5,602
Mitchell	2,761	65.0%	1,479	34.8%	6	0.1%	1,282	30.2%	4,246
Monona	2,376	72.8%	879	26.9%	9	0.3%	1,497	45.9%	3,264
Monroe	2,135	73.5%	762	26.2%	6	0.2%	1,373	47.3%	2,903
Montgomery	2,509	71.3%	1,004	28.5%	5	0.1%	1,505	42.8%	3,518
Muscatine	7,623	57.8%	5,550	42.1%	20	0.2%	2,073	15.7%	13,193
O'Brien	4,361	81.7%	972	18.2%	3	0.1%	1,577	63.5%	2,272
Osceola	1,923	84.6%	346	15.2%	3	0.1%	1,577	69.4%	2,272
Page	3,707	72.6%	1,385	27.1%	12	0.2%	2,322	45.5%	5,104
Palo Alto	2,586	72.1%	994	27.7%	6	0.2%	1,592	44.4%	3,586
Plymouth	7,650	78.7%	2,053	21.1%	13	0.1%	5,597	57.6%	9,716
Pocahontas	2,158	76.5%	658	23.3%	4	0.2%	1,500	53.2%	2,820
Polk	83,279	43.6%	107,478	56.2%	377	0.2%	-24,199	-12.6%	191,134
Pottawattamie	17,785	61.3%	11,173	38.5%	50	0.2%	6,612	22.8%	29,008
Poweshiek	4,325	57.6%	3,174	42.3%	12	0.2%	1,151	15.3%	7,511
Ringgold	1,484	72.6%	556	27.2%	3	0.1%	928	45.4%	2,043
Sac	2,999	76.5%	914	23.3%	8	0.2%	2,085	53.2%	3,921
Scott	32,955	51.7%	30,655	48.1%	96	0.2%	2,300	3.6%	63,706
Shelby	3,401	73.6%	1,213	26.3%	6	0.1%	2,188	47.3%	4,620
Sioux	12,398	87.9%	1,694	12.0%	15	0.1%	10,704	75.9%	14,107
Story	15,870	42.9%	21,022	56.9%	66	0.2%	-5,152	-14.0%	36,958
Tama	4,241	64.0%	2,373	35.8%	10	0.2%	1,868	28.2%	6,624
Taylor	1,764	78.2%	487	21.6%	4	0.2%	1,277	56.6%	2,255
Union	3,035	67.4%	1,464	32.5%	7	0.2%	1,571	34.9%	4,506
Van Buren	2,097	75.6%	671	24.2%	6	0.2%	1,426	51.4%	2,774
Wapello	6,601	63.2%	3,837	36.7%	10	0.1%	2,764	26.5%	10,448
Warren	14,052	59.2%	9,634	40.6%	52	0.2%	4,418	18.6%	23,758
Washington	5,450	62.7%	3,235	37.2%	6	0.1%	2,215	25.5%	8,691
Wayne	1,860	78.2%	514	21.6%	4	0.2%	1,346	56.6%	2,378
Webster	7,704	64.4%	4,244	35.5%	17	0.1%	3,460	28.9%	11,965
Winnebago	2,881	66.0%	1,478	33.9%	3	0.1%	1,403	32.1%	4,362
Winneshiek	5,094	53.1%	4,477	46.7%	15	0.2%	617	6.4%	9,586
Woodbury	18,161	63.4%	10,409	36.3%	66	0.2%	7,752	27.1%	28,636
Worth	2,031	63.1%	1,183	36.8%	5	0.2%	848	26.3%	3,219
Wright	2,982	70.0%	1,268	29.8%	9	0.2%	1,714	40.2%	4,259
Totals	681,501	56.0%	533,330	43.8%	1,815	0.1%	148,171	12.2%	1,216,646

Counties that flipped from Republican to Democratic

- Black Hawk (largest city: Waterloo)
- Linn (largest city: Cedar Rapids)
- Polk (largest city: Des Moines)
- Story (largest city: Ames)

==== By congressional district ====
Grassley won all four congressional districts.

District	Grassley	Franken	Representative
1st	53%	47%	Mariannette Miller-Meeks
2nd	55%	45%	Ashley Hinson
3rd	51%	48%	Cindy Axne (117th Congress)
3rd	51%	48%	Zach Nunn (118th Congress)
4th	66%	34%	Randy Feenstra

== See also ==
- 2022 United States Senate elections
- 2022 Iowa elections

== Notes ==
Partisan clients
