= 2012 Iowa House of Representatives election =

- November 6, 2012

All 100 seats in the Iowa House of Representatives 51 seats needed for a majority
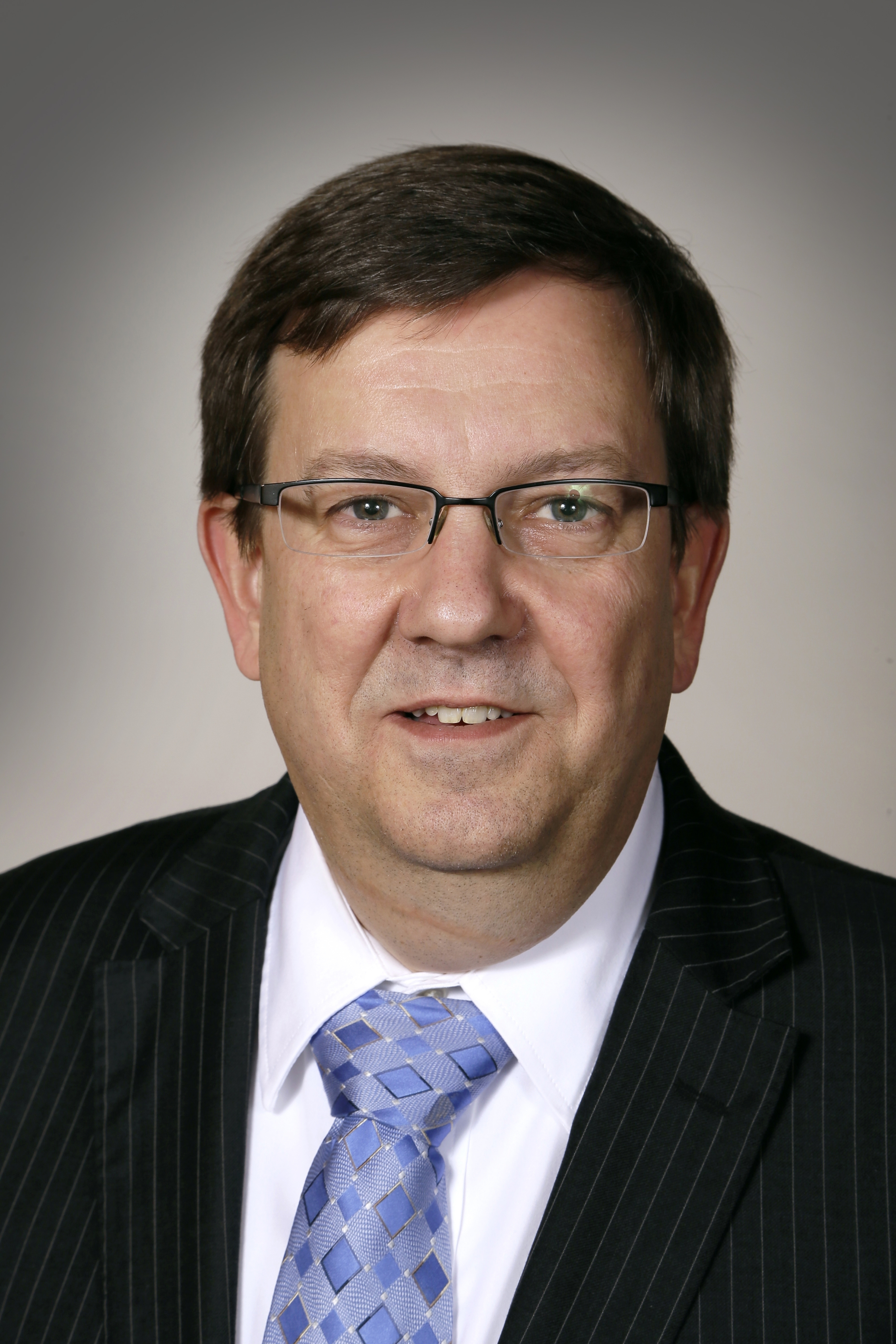

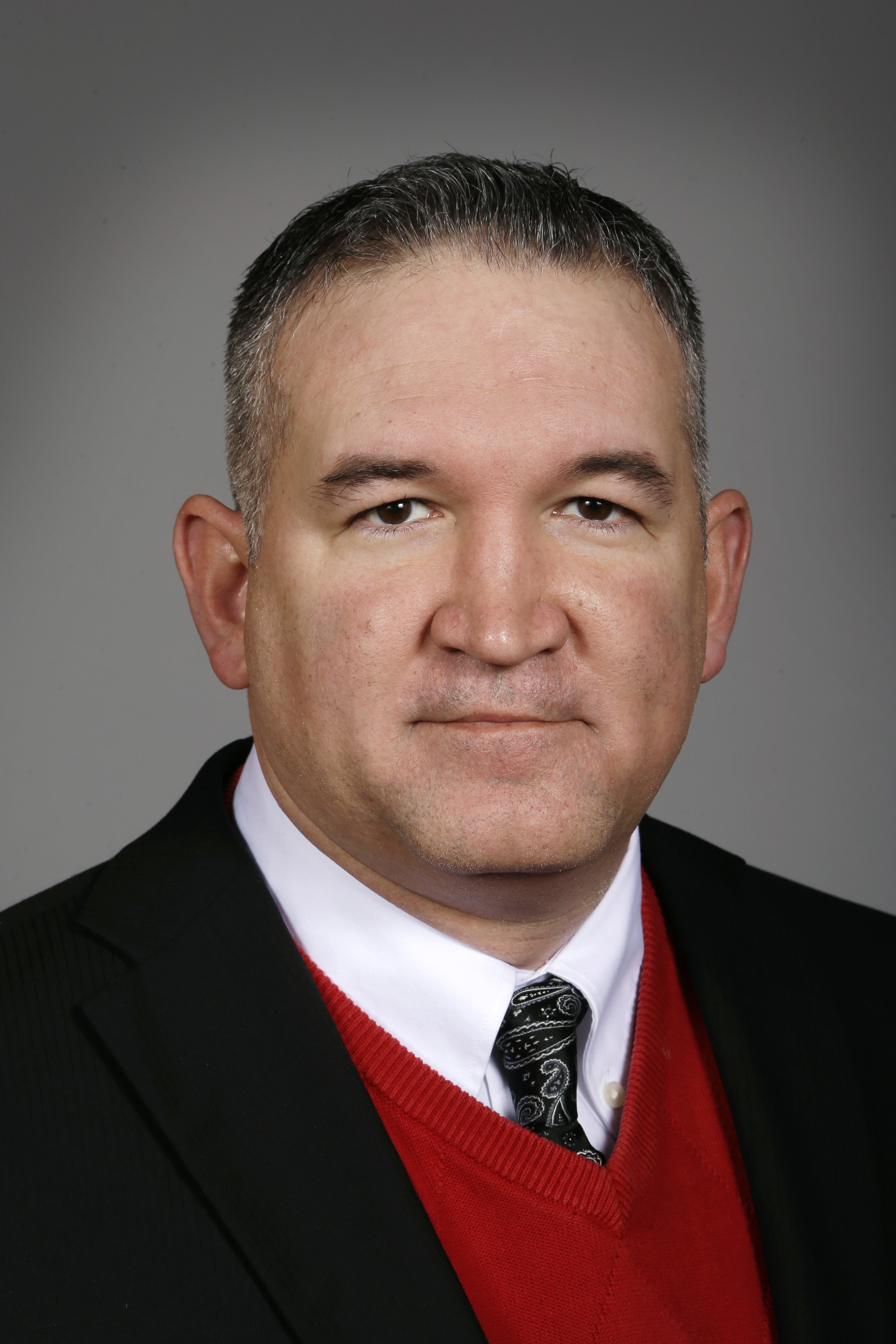
	Majority party	Minority party
Leader	Kraig Paulsen	Kevin McCarthy
Party	Republican	Democratic
Leader's seat	35th district	33rd district
Last election	60	40
Seats after	53	47
Seat change	▼7	▲7
Speaker of the House before election
Kraig Paulsen
Republican
Elected Speaker of the House
Kraig Paulsen
Republican

The 2012 Iowa House of Representatives election was held on November 6, 2012, to determine which party would control the Iowa House of Representatives for the following two years. All 100 seats were up for election and the primary was held on June 5, 2012. This was the first election for the Iowa House using the new legislative maps that were enacted following the 2010 census. Prior to the election 60 seats were held by Republicans and 40 were held by Democrats. The general election saw the Democrats flip 7 seats, meaning that Republicans kept control of the chamber.

== Predictions ==
Source	Ranking	As of
Governing	Likely R	October 24, 2012

== Retirements ==
Seventeen incumbents (13 Republicans and 4 Democrats) did not run for re-election in 2012. Those incumbents were:

1. District 5: Royd Chambers (R) retired.
2. District 9: Stewart Iverson (R) retired.
3. District 18: Andrew Wenthe (D) retired.
4. District 23: Dan Rasmussen (R) retired.
5. District 29: Nathan Willems (D) retired.
6. District 40: Lance Horbach (R) retired.
7. District 42: Kim Pearson (R) retired.
8. District 50: Dave Tjepkes (R) retired.
9. District 63: Scott Raecker (R) retired.
10. District 64: Janet Petersen (D) retired.
11. District 71: Jim Van Engelenhoven (R) retired.
12. District 72: Rich Arnold (R) retired.
13. District 74: Glen Massie (R) retired.
14. District 76: Betty De Boef (R) retired.
15. District 79: Jeff Kaufmann (R) retired.
16. District 94: Kurt Swaim (D) retired.
17. District 97: Rich Anderson (R) retired.

== Incumbents defeated ==
=== In primary ===
1. District 39: Erik Helland (R) lost renomination to Jake Highfill.
2. District 50: Annette Sweeney (R) lost renomination to Pat Grassley.

=== In the general election ===
1. District 7: John Wittneben (D) lost re-election to Tedd Gassman.
2. District 13: Jeremy Taylor (R) lost re-election to Chris Hall.
3. District 56: Bob Hager (R) lost re-election to Patti Ruff.
4. District 66: Renee Schulte (R) lost re-election to Art Staed.
5. District 68: Nick Wagner (R) lost re-election to Daniel Lundby.
6. District 92: Ross Paustian (R) lost re-election to Frank Wood.

== Closest races ==
Seats where the margin of victory was under 10%:

1. District 7, 0.20% (gain)
2. District 43, 0.20%
3. District 63, 0.60%
4. District 80, 0.60%
5. District 68, 0.60% (gain)
6. District 55, 1.20%
7. District 72, 1.20%
8. District 95, 1.20%
9. District 56, 2.00% (gain)
10. District 58, 2.60%
11. District 60, 3.80%
12. District 15, 4.00%
13. District 26, 4.00%
14. District 30, 4.00%
15. District 39, 4.00%
16. District 92, 4.60% (gain)
17. District 47, 4.80%
18. District 76, 5.20%
19. District 67, 5.60%
20. District 40, 6.20%
21. District 13, 6.40% (gain)
22. District 91, 6.40%
23. District 88, 6.80%
24. District 38, 9.20%
25. District 25, 9.60%

== Results ==
=== District 1 ===
District 1 election, 2012
Party	Candidate	Votes	%
Republican	Jeff Smith (Incumbent)	13,604	100.0%
Total votes		13,604	100.0%
Republican hold			

=== District 2 ===
District 2 election, 2012
Party	Candidate	Votes	%
Republican	Megan Jones	8,652	56.50%
Democratic	Steve Bomgaars	6,652	43.40%
Total votes		15,304	100.0%
Republican hold			

=== District 3 ===
District 3 election, 2012
Party	Candidate	Votes	%
Republican	Dan Huseman (Incumbent)	12,461	100.0%
Total votes		12,461	100.0%
Republican hold			

=== District 4 ===
District 4 election, 2012
Party	Candidate	Votes	%
Republican	Dwayne Alons (Incumbent)	13,846	100.0%
Total votes		13,846	100.0%
Republican hold			

=== District 5 ===
District 5 election, 2012
Party	Candidate	Votes	%
Republican	Chuck Soderberg (Incumbent)	12,011	100.0%
Total votes		12,011	100.0%
Republican hold			

=== District 6 ===
District 6 election, 2012
Party	Candidate	Votes	%
Republican	Ron Jorgensen (Incumbent)	10,793	100.0%
Total votes		10,793	100.0%
Republican hold			

=== District 7 ===
District 7 election, 2012
Party	Candidate	Votes	%
Republican	Tedd Gassman	7,669	50.10%
Democratic	John Wittneben (Incumbent)	7,625	49.90%
Total votes		15,294	100.0%
Republican gain from Democratic			

=== District 8 ===
District 8 election, 2012
Party	Candidate	Votes	%
Republican	Henry Rayhons (Incumbent)	11,585	100.0%
Total votes		11,585	100.0%
Republican hold			

=== District 9 ===
District 9 election, 2012
Party	Candidate	Votes	%
Democratic	Helen Miller (Incumbent)	8,399	60.60%
Republican	Matt Alcazar	5,450	39.40%
Total votes		13,849	100.0%
Democratic hold			

=== District 10 ===
District 10 election, 2012
Party	Candidate	Votes	%
Republican	Tom W. Shaw (Incumbent)	12,339	100.0%
Total votes		12,339	100.0%
Republican hold			

=== District 11 ===
District 11 election, 2012
Party	Candidate	Votes	%
Republican	Gary Worthan (Incumbent)	9,980	100.0%
Total votes		9,980	100.0%
Republican hold			

=== District 12 ===
District 12 election, 2012
Party	Candidate	Votes	%
Democratic	Dan Muhlbauer (Incumbent)	9,189	61.00%
Republican	Barney Bornhoft	5,861	39.00%
Total votes		15,050	100.0%
Democratic hold			

=== District 13 ===
District 13 election, 2012
Party	Candidate	Votes	%
Democratic	Chris Hall (Incumbent)	6,410	53.20%
Republican	Jeremy Taylor (Incumbent)	5,615	46.80%
Total votes		15,050	100.0%
Democratic gain from Republican			

=== District 14 ===
District 14 election, 2012
Party	Candidate	Votes	%
Democratic	David Dawson	6,617	59.40%
Republican	Greg Grupp	4,494	40.60%
Total votes		11,111	100.0%
Democratic hold			

=== District 15 ===
District 15 election, 2012
Party	Candidate	Votes	%
Republican	Mark Brandenburg (Incumbent)	5,452	52.00%
Democratic	George Warren Yaple	5,013	48.00%
Total votes		10,465	100.0%
Republican hold			

=== District 16 ===
District 16 election, 2012
Party	Candidate	Votes	%
Republican	Mary Ann Hanusa (Incumbent)	6,847	57.10%
Democratic	Heidi Guggisberg-Coners	5,117	42.90%
Total votes		11,964	100.0%
Republican hold			

=== District 17 ===
District 17 election, 2012
Party	Candidate	Votes	%
Republican	Matt Windschitl (Incumbent)	11,153	100.0%
Total votes		11,153	100.0%
Republican hold			

=== District 18 ===
District 18 election, 2012
Party	Candidate	Votes	%
Republican	Jason Schultz (Incumbent)	8,351	65.20%
Democratic	Kasey Friedrichsen	4,406	34.80%
Total votes		12,757	100.0%
Republican hold			

=== District 19 ===
District 19 election, 2012
Party	Candidate	Votes	%
Republican	Ralph Watts (Incumbent)	9,908	58.50%
Democratic	Kenneth P. Herring	7,009	41.50%
Total votes		16,917	100.0%
Republican hold			

=== District 20 ===
District 20 election, 2012
Party	Candidate	Votes	%
Republican	Clel Baudler (Incumbent)	8,109	57.80%
Democratic	Greg Nepstad	5,883	42.20%
Total votes		13,992	100.0%
Republican hold			

=== District 21 ===
District 21 election, 2012
Party	Candidate	Votes	%
Republican	Jack Drake (Incumbent)	8,322	56.90%
Democratic	John Rose	6,297	43.10%
Total votes		14,619	100.0%
Republican hold			

=== District 22 ===
District 22 election, 2012
Party	Candidate	Votes	%
Republican	Greg Forristall (Incumbent)	13,180	100.0%
Total votes		13,180	100.0%
Republican hold			

=== District 23 ===
District 23 election, 2012
Party	Candidate	Votes	%
Republican	Mark Costello	10,743	100.0%
Total votes		10,743	100.0%
Republican hold			

=== District 24 ===
District 24 election, 2012
Party	Candidate	Votes	%
Republican	Cecil Dolecheck (Incumbent)	11,036	100.0%
Total votes		11,036	100.0%
Republican hold			

=== District 25 ===
District 25 election, 2012
Party	Candidate	Votes	%
Republican	Julian Garrett (Incumbent)	9,082	54.80%
Democratic	Katie Routh	7,487	45.20%
Total votes		16,569	100.0%
Republican hold			

=== District 26 ===
District 26 election, 2012
Party	Candidate	Votes	%
Democratic	Scott Ourth	8,452	52.00%
Republican	Steve McCoy	7,758	48.00%
Total votes		16,210	100.0%
Democratic hold			

=== District 27 ===
District 27 election, 2012
Party	Candidate	Votes	%
Republican	Joel Fry (Incumbent)	8,230	67.30%
Independent	Ruth Eileen Smith	3,977	32.70%
Total votes		12,207	100.0%
Republican hold			

=== District 28 ===
District 28 election, 2012
Party	Candidate	Votes	%
Republican	Greg Heartsill	8,197	55.50%
Democratic	Megan Suhr	6,569	44.50%
Total votes		14,766	100.0%
Republican hold			

=== District 29 ===
District 29 election, 2012
Party	Candidate	Votes	%
Democratic	Dan Kelley (Incumbent)	9,831	62.30%
Republican	Gabe Swersie	5,927	37.70%
Total votes		15,758	100.0%
Democratic hold			

=== District 30 ===
District 30 election, 2012
Party	Candidate	Votes	%
Democratic	Joe Riding	8,764	52.00%
Republican	Jim Carley	8,044	48.00%
Total votes		16,808	100.0%
Democratic hold			

=== District 31 ===
District 31 election, 2012
Party	Candidate	Votes	%
Democratic	Rick Olson (Incumbent)	9,803	100.0%
Total votes		9,803	100.0%
Democratic hold			

=== District 32 ===
District 32 election, 2012
Party	Candidate	Votes	%
Democratic	Ruth Ann Gaines (Incumbent)	8,073	72.10%
Republican	Joe Corbin	3,109	37.90%
Total votes		11,182	100.0%
Democratic hold			

=== District 33 ===
District 33 election, 2012
Party	Candidate	Votes	%
Democratic	Kevin McCarthy (Incumbent)	8,772	72.40%
Republican	Daniel G. LeRette	3,303	37.60%
Total votes		12,075	100.0%
Democratic hold			

=== District 34 ===
District 34 election, 2012
Party	Candidate	Votes	%
Democratic	Bruce Hunter (Incumbent)	8,813	65.50%
Republican	Patti Branco	4,608	34.50%
Total votes		13,421	100.0%
Democratic hold			

=== District 35 ===
District 35 election, 2012
Party	Candidate	Votes	%
Democratic	Ako Abdul-Samad (Incumbent)	7,508	73.20%
Republican	Terrance Williams	2,727	26.80%
Total votes		10,235	100.0%
Democratic hold			

=== District 36 ===
District 36 election, 2012
Party	Candidate	Votes	%
Democratic	Marti Anderson	11,360	67.70%
Republican	Jeff Ibbotson	5,368	32.30%
Total votes		16,728	100.0%
Democratic hold			

=== District 37 ===
District 37 election, 2012
Party	Candidate	Votes	%
Republican	John Landon	11,042	74.80%
Independent	N. John Boehm	3,598	25.20%
Total votes		14,640	100.0%
Republican hold			

=== District 38 ===
District 38 election, 2012
Party	Candidate	Votes	%
Republican	Kevin Koester (Incumbent)	8,331	52.40%
Democratic	John Phoenix	6,858	43.20%
Independent	Brett H. Nelson	686	4.40%
Total votes		15,875	100.0%
Republican hold			

=== District 39 ===
District 39 election, 2012
Party	Candidate	Votes	%
Republican	Jake Highfill	9,218	52.00%
Democratic	Kelsey Clark	8,466	48.00%
Total votes		17,684	100.0%
Republican hold			

=== District 40 ===
District 40 election, 2012
Party	Candidate	Votes	%
Democratic	John Forbes	9,113	53.10%
Republican	Mike Brown	8,044	46.90%
Total votes		17,157	100.0%
Democratic hold			

=== District 41 ===
District 41 election, 2012
Party	Candidate	Votes	%
Democratic	Jo Oldson (Incumbent)	12,055	70.30%
Republican	Clarke Davidson	5,054	29.70%
Total votes		17,109	100.0%
Democratic hold			

=== District 42 ===
District 42 election, 2012
Party	Candidate	Votes	%
Republican	Peter Cownie (Incumbent)	9,581	56.60%
Democratic	Mike McRae	7,341	43.40%
Total votes		16,922	100.0%
Republican hold			

=== District 43 ===
District 43 election, 2012
Party	Candidate	Votes	%
Republican	Chris Hagenow (Incumbent)	8,741	50.10%
Democratic	Susan Judkins	8,719	49.90%
Total votes		17,460	100.0%
Republican hold			

=== District 44 ===
District 44 election, 2012
Party	Candidate	Votes	%
Republican	Rob Taylor	10,101	58.20%
Democratic	Eric Brenneman	7,242	41.80%
Total votes		17,343	100.0%
Republican hold			

=== District 45 ===
District 45 election, 2012
Party	Candidate	Votes	%
Democratic	Beth Wessel-Kroeschell (Incumbent)	8,699	59.20%
Republican	Dane Nealson	5,081	34.60%
Independent	Eric Cooper	888	6.20%
Total votes		14,668	100.0%
Democratic hold			

=== District 46 ===
District 46 election, 2012
Party	Candidate	Votes	%
Democratic	Lisa Heddens (Incumbent)	8,830	62.80%
Republican	Stephen Quist	5,209	37.20%
Total votes		14,039	100.0%
Democratic hold			

=== District 47 ===
District 47 election, 2012
Party	Candidate	Votes	%
Republican	Chip Baltimore (Incumbent)	8,133	52.40%
Democratic	Donovan Olson	7,377	47.60%
Total votes		15,510	100.0%
Republican hold			

=== District 48 ===
District 48 election, 2012
Party	Candidate	Votes	%
Republican	Robert Bacon	8,485	55.10%
Democratic	Becky Perkovich	6,889	44.90%
Total votes		15,374	100.0%
Republican hold			

=== District 49 ===
District 49 election, 2012
Party	Candidate	Votes	%
Republican	Dave Deyoe (Incumbent)	9,192	59.80%
Democratic	Kevin Ericson	6,171	40.20%
Total votes		15,363	100.0%
Republican hold			

=== District 50 ===
District 50 election, 2012
Party	Candidate	Votes	%
Republican	Pat Grassley (Incumbent)	12,187	100.0%
Total votes		12,187	100.0%
Republican hold			

=== District 51 ===
District 51 election, 2012
Party	Candidate	Votes	%
Republican	Joshua Byrnes (Incumbent)	9,714	64.50%
Democratic	Eric S. Hungerford	5,324	35.50%
Total votes		15,038	100.0%
Republican hold			

=== District 52 ===
District 52 election, 2012
Party	Candidate	Votes	%
Democratic	Brian Quirk (Incumbent)	9,777	71.30%
Independent	Craig Clark	3,916	28.70%
Total votes		13,693	100.0%
Democratic hold			

=== District 53 ===
District 53 election, 2012
Party	Candidate	Votes	%
Democratic	Sharon Steckman (Incumbent)	12,269	100.0%
Total votes		12,269	100.0%
Democratic hold			

=== District 54 ===
District 54 election, 2012
Party	Candidate	Votes	%
Republican	Linda Upmeyer (Incumbent)	12,349	100.0%
Total votes		12,349	100.0%
Republican hold			

=== District 55 ===
District 55 election, 2012
Party	Candidate	Votes	%
Democratic	Roger Thomas (Incumbent)	7,781	50.60%
Republican	Michael T. Klimesh	7,585	49.40%
Total votes		15,196	100.0%
Democratic hold			

=== District 56 ===
District 56 election, 2012
Party	Candidate	Votes	%
Democratic	Patti Ruff	7,361	51.00%
Republican	Bob Hager (Incumbent)	7,054	49.00%
Total votes		14,415	100.0%
Democratic gain from Republican			

=== District 57 ===
District 57 election, 2012
Party	Candidate	Votes	%
Democratic	Nancy Dunkel (Incumbent)	11,779	100.0%
Total votes		11,779	100.0%
Democratic hold			

=== District 58 ===
District 58 election, 2012
Party	Candidate	Votes	%
Republican	Brian Moore (Incumbent)	7,964	51.30%
Democratic	Tom Schueller	7,549	48.70%
Total votes		15,513	100.0%
Republican hold			

=== District 59 ===
District 59 election, 2012
Party	Candidate	Votes	%
Democratic	Bob Kressig (Incumbent)	8,762	56.90%
Republican	James R. Kenyon	6,621	43.10%
Total votes		15,383	100.0%
Democratic hold			

=== District 60 ===
District 60 election, 2012
Party	Candidate	Votes	%
Republican	Walt Rogers (Incumbent)	8,966	51.90%
Democratic	Bob Greenwood	8,298	48.10%
Total votes		17,264	100.0%
Republican hold			

=== District 61 ===
District 61 election, 2012
Party	Candidate	Votes	%
Democratic	Anesa Kajtazović (Incumbent)	9,602	70.20%
Republican	Lyn Tackett	4,063	29.80%
Total votes		13,665	100.0%
Democratic hold			

=== District 62 ===
District 62 election, 2012
Party	Candidate	Votes	%
Democratic	Deborah Berry (Incumbent)	10,488	87.00%
Independent	Chad Folken	1,539	13.00%
Total votes		12,027	100.0%
Democratic hold			

=== District 63 ===
District 63 election, 2012
Party	Candidate	Votes	%
Republican	Sandy Salmon	8,298	50.30%
Democratic	Bill Heckroth	8,183	49.70%
Total votes		16,481	100.0%
Republican hold			

=== District 64 ===
District 64 election, 2012
Party	Candidate	Votes	%
Democratic	Bruce Bearinger	9,493	65.40%
Republican	Jim Givant	5,007	34.60%
Total votes		14,500	100.0%
Democratic hold			

=== District 65 ===
District 65 election, 2012
Party	Candidate	Votes	%
Democratic	Tyler Olson (Incumbent)	12,269	100.0%
Total votes		12,269	100.0%
Democratic hold			

=== District 66 ===
District 66 election, 2012
Party	Candidate	Votes	%
Democratic	Art Staed	9,286	55.00%
Republican	Renee Schulte (Incumbent)	7,575	45.00%
Total votes		16,861	100.0%
Democratic gain from Republican			

=== District 67 ===
District 67 election, 2012
Party	Candidate	Votes	%
Republican	Kraig Paulsen (Incumbent)	8,898	52.80%
Democratic	Mark Seidl	7,947	47.20%
Total votes		16,845	100.0%
Republican hold			

=== District 68 ===
District 68 election, 2012
Party	Candidate	Votes	%
Democratic	Daniel Lundby	8,480	50.30%
Republican	Nick Wagner (Incumbent)	8,363	49.70%
Total votes		16,843	100.0%
Democratic gain from Republican			

=== District 69 ===
District 69 election, 2012
Party	Candidate	Votes	%
Democratic	Kirsten Running-Marquardt (Incumbent)	11,316	100.0%
Total votes		11,316	100.0%
Democratic hold			

=== District 70 ===
District 70 election, 2012
Party	Candidate	Votes	%
Democratic	Todd Taylor (Incumbent)	10,487	63.80%
Republican	Lance Lefebure	5,929	36.20%
Total votes		16,416	100.0%
Democratic hold			

=== District 71 ===
District 71 election, 2012
Party	Candidate	Votes	%
Democratic	Mark Smith (Incumbent)	7,911	59.30%
Republican	Allen Burt	5,431	40.70%
Total votes		13,342	100.0%
Democratic hold			

=== District 72 ===
District 72 election, 2012
Party	Candidate	Votes	%
Republican	Dean Fisher	7,778	50.60%
Democratic	Nathan Wrage	7,562	49.40%
Total votes		15,340	100.0%
Republican hold			

=== District 73 ===
District 73 election, 2012
Party	Candidate	Votes	%
Republican	Bobby Kaufmann	9,068	56.30%
Democratic	Dick Schwab	7,016	43.70%
Total votes		16,084	100.0%
Republican hold			

=== District 74 ===
District 74 election, 2012
Party	Candidate	Votes	%
Democratic	David Jacoby (Incumbent)	12,246	100.0%
Total votes		12,246	100.0%
Democratic hold			

=== District 75 ===
District 75 election, 2012
Party	Candidate	Votes	%
Republican	Dawn Pettengill (Incumbent)	9,166	58.50%
Democratic	Sandra K. Cronbaugh	6,479	41.50%
Total votes		15,645	100.0%
Republican hold			

=== District 76 ===
District 76 election, 2012
Party	Candidate	Votes	%
Republican	David Maxwell	8,401	52.60%
Democratic	Rachel Bly	7,561	47.40%
Total votes		15,962	100.0%
Republican hold			

=== District 77 ===
District 77 election, 2012
Party	Candidate	Votes	%
Democratic	Sally Stutsman	9,907	59.80%
Republican	Steve Sherman	6,641	40.20%
Total votes		16,548	100.0%
Democratic hold			

=== District 78 ===
District 78 election, 2012
Party	Candidate	Votes	%
Republican	Jarad Klein (Incumbent)	10,715	100.0%
Total votes		10,715	100.0%
Republican hold			

=== District 79 ===
District 79 election, 2012
Party	Candidate	Votes	%
Republican	Guy Vander Linden (Incumbent)	10,804	72.00%
Democratic	Chris Wilson	4,177	28.00%
Total votes		14,981	100.0%
Republican hold			

=== District 80 ===
District 80 election, 2012
Party	Candidate	Votes	%
Republican	Larry Sheets	7,271	50.30%
Democratic	Joseph Judge	7,161	49.70%
Total votes		14,432	100.0%
Republican hold			

=== District 81 ===
District 81 election, 2012
Party	Candidate	Votes	%
Democratic	Mary Gaskill (Incumbent)	7,706	59.80%
Republican	Blake Smith	5,158	40.20%
Total votes		12,864	100.0%
Democratic hold			

=== District 82 ===
District 82 election, 2012
Party	Candidate	Votes	%
Democratic	Curt Hanson (Incumbent)	8,613	58.90%
Republican	James F. Johnson	5,984	40.10%
Total votes		14,597	100.0%
Democratic hold			

=== District 83 ===
District 83 election, 2012
Party	Candidate	Votes	%
Democratic	Jerry Kearns (Incumbent)	9,447	63.60%
Republican	James Steffen	5,373	36.40%
Total votes		14,820	100.0%
Democratic hold			

=== District 84 ===
District 84 election, 2012
Party	Candidate	Votes	%
Republican	Dave Heaton (Incumbent)	11,674	100.0%
Total votes		11,674	100.0%
Republican hold			

=== District 85 ===
District 85 election, 2012
Party	Candidate	Votes	%
Democratic	Vicki Lensing (Incumbent)	14,241	100.0%
Total votes		14,241	100.0%
Democratic hold			

=== District 86 ===
District 86 election, 2012
Party	Candidate	Votes	%
Democratic	Mary Mascher (Incumbent)	12,834	100.0%
Total votes		12,834	100.0%
Democratic hold			

=== District 87 ===
District 87 election, 2012
Party	Candidate	Votes	%
Democratic	Dennis Cohoon (Incumbent)	6,898	47.20%
Independent	Dan Cahill	5,234	35.80%
Republican	Andrew Wilson	2,489	17.00%
Total votes		14,621	100.0%
Democratic hold			

=== District 88 ===
District 88 election, 2012
Party	Candidate	Votes	%
Republican	Thomas Sands (Incumbent)	7,548	53.40%
Democratic	Sara Sedlacek	6,550	46.60%
Total votes		14,098	100.0%
Republican hold			

=== District 89 ===
District 89 election, 2012
Party	Candidate	Votes	%
Democratic	Jim Lykam (Incumbent)	10,357	67.40%
Republican	Bill Edmond	4,992	32.60%
Total votes		15,349	100.0%
Democratic hold			

=== District 90 ===
District 90 election, 2012
Party	Candidate	Votes	%
Democratic	Cindy Winckler (Incumbent)	8,988	73.20%
Republican	Ryan Roberson	2,692	21.90%
Independent	Mark Riley	587	4.90%
Total votes		12,267	100.0%
Democratic hold			

=== District 91 ===
District 91 election, 2012
Party	Candidate	Votes	%
Republican	Mark Lofgren (Incumbent)	7,426	53.20%
Democratic	John Dabeet	6,511	46.80%
Total votes		13,937	100.0%
Republican hold			

=== District 92 ===
District 92 election, 2012
Party	Candidate	Votes	%
Democratic	Frank Wood	8,392	52.30%
Republican	Ross Paustian (Incumbent)	7,626	47.70%
Total votes		16,018	100.0%
Democratic gain from Republican			

=== District 93 ===
District 93 election, 2012
Party	Candidate	Votes	%
Democratic	Phyllis Thede (Incumbent)	9,679	56.50%
Republican	Mark Nelson	7,429	43.50%
Total votes		17,108	100.0%
Democratic hold			

=== District 94 ===
District 94 election, 2012
Party	Candidate	Votes	%
Republican	Linda Miller (Incumbent)	10,330	55.40%
Democratic	Maria Bribriesco	8,314	44.60%
Total votes		18,644	100.0%
Republican hold			

=== District 95 ===
District 95 election, 2012
Party	Candidate	Votes	%
Republican	Quentin Stanerson	8,494	50.60%
Democratic	Kristin Keast	8,294	49.40%
Total votes		16,788	100.0%
Republican hold			

=== District 96 ===
District 96 election, 2012
Party	Candidate	Votes	%
Republican	Lee Hein (Incumbent)	10,276	100.0%
Total votes		10,276	100.0%
Republican hold			

=== District 97 ===
District 97 election, 2012
Party	Candidate	Votes	%
Republican	Steven Olson (Incumbent)	10,088	60.50%
Democratic	Ted Whisler	6,572	39.50%
Total votes		16,660	100.0%
Republican hold			

=== District 98 ===
District 98 election, 2012
Party	Candidate	Votes	%
Democratic	Mary Wolfe (Incumbent)	10,052	76.20%
Independent	Carolyn Grimes	3,129	23.80%
Total votes		13,181	100.0%
Democratic hold			

=== District 99 ===
District 99 election, 2012
Party	Candidate	Votes	%
Democratic	Pat Murphy (Incumbent)	10,098	59.60%
Republican	Paul Kern	6,822	40.40%
Total votes		16,920	100.0%
Democratic hold			

=== District 100 ===
District 100 election, 2012
Party	Candidate	Votes	%
Democratic	Charles Isenhart (Incumbent)	10,557	100.0%
Total votes		10,557	100.0%
Democratic hold			
