= Bradly Banks =

American politician (born 1952)

Member of the Iowa Senate from the 2nd district
- In office January 11, 1993 – January 12, 1997
- Preceded by: Donald V. Doyle
- Succeeded by: John Redwine

Member of the Iowa House of Representatives from the 5th district
- In office January 9, 1989 – January 10, 1993
- Preceded by: Donald Paulin
- Succeeded by: Lee J. Plasier

Personal details
- Born: Bradly C. Banks; July 20, 1952 (age 74) Akron, Iowa, U.S.
- Party: Republican
- Spouse: Carla (m. 1970)
- Children: 3
- Education: Western Iowa Tech Community College
- Occupation: Politician, farmer

Military service
- Allegiance: United States
- Branch/service: United States Army
- Years of service: 1972–1974

Bradly C. Banks (born July 20, 1952) is an American former politician.

Banks was born in Akron, Iowa, on July 20, 1952, to parents Lloyd John and Annabelle Banks. Bradly Banks attended the Westfield Community Schools, after which he graduated from Western Iowa Technical Community College in 1972. He served two years of active duty in the United States Army between 1972 and 1974, then became a reservist until 1978. He ran a farm in Plymouth County, Iowa.

Banks represented Plymouth County as a Republican in the Iowa General Assembly from 1989 to 1997. He was elected to two consecutive terms as a member of the Iowa House of Representatives from District 5 from 1989 to 1993, then served a single four-year term in the Iowa Senate for District 2.

Banks married his wife Carla in 1970. The couple raised three sons.
