= Henry Stone (born 1971) =

American politician (born 1971)

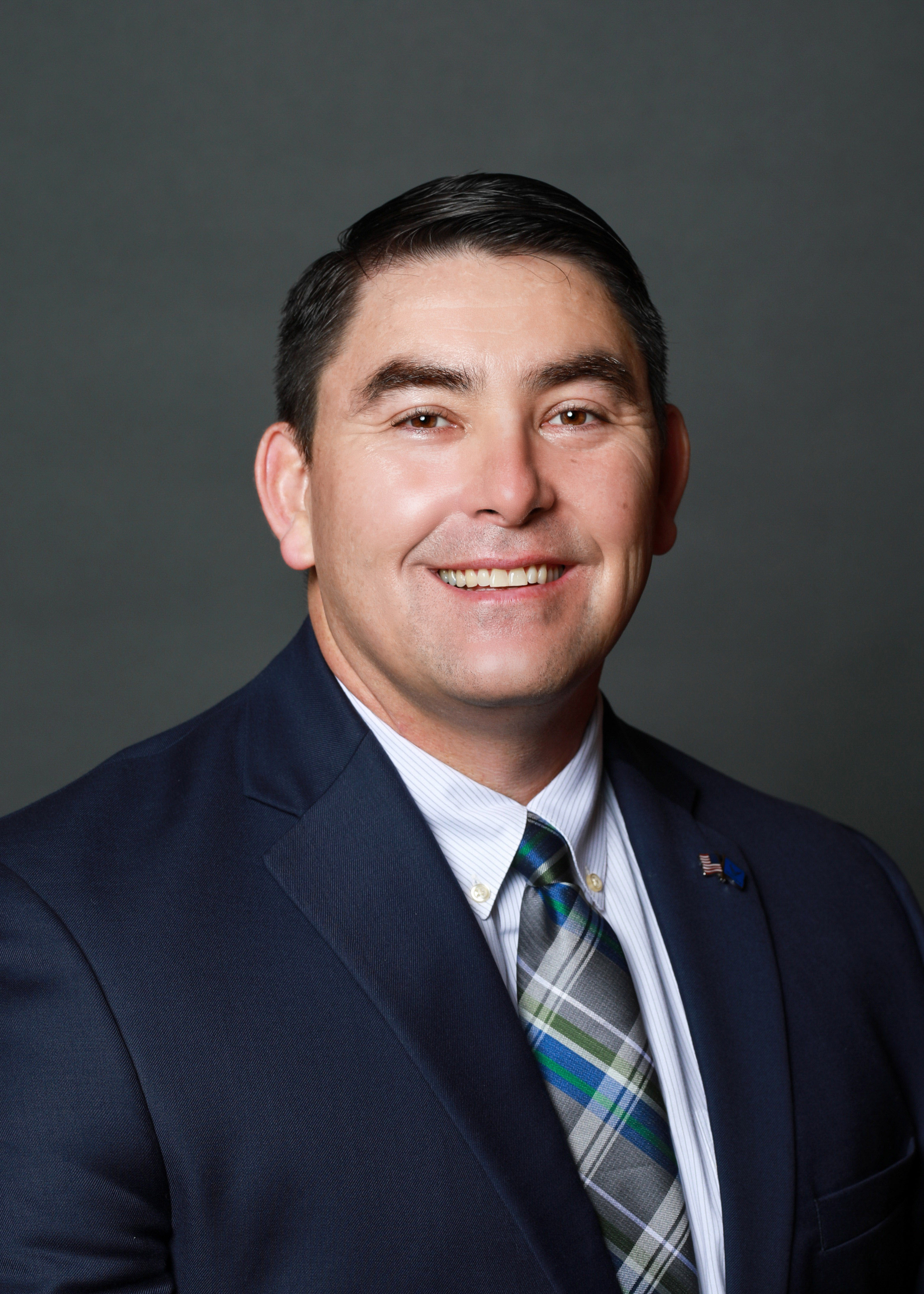
- Stone in 2021

Member of the Iowa House of Representatives from the 9th district
- Incumbent
- Assumed office January 9, 2023
- Preceded by: Dennis Bush

Member of the Iowa House of Representatives from the 7th district
- In office January 11, 2021 – January 8, 2023
- Preceded by: Chuck Holz
- Succeeded by: Zach Dieken

Personal details
- Born: 1971 (age 54–55) Gyeonggi Province, South Korea
- Party: Republican
- Spouse: Pennie
- Children: 4
- Education: University of Phoenix (BBA); Trident University International (MEd)

Military service
- Branch/service: United States Air Force
- Rank: Master Sergeant

Henry Stone (born 1971) is an American politician serving as a member of the Iowa House of Representatives from the 9th district. Elected in November 2020, he assumed office on January 11, 2021.

== Early life and education ==
Stone was born in 1971 in Gyeonggi Province, South Korea, raised in a military family, and lived throughout the United States as a child. After graduating from high school, he joined the United States Air Force. He served in the Air Force for 22 years and retired as a master sergeant. He earned a Bachelor of Business Administration from the University of Phoenix and a Master of Education from Trident University International.

== Career ==
Since retiring from the military, Stone has worked as a college football coach. He was an assistant coach and offensive coordinator at Waldorf University where he coached wide receivers and quarterbacks. He was elected to the Iowa House of Representatives in November 2020 for District 7 and assumed office on January 11, 2021. He served as vice chair of the House Economic Growth Committee and currently serves on the Leadership Team as the Majority Whip. Stone ran for reelection in 2022 from District 9.

Iowa House of Representatives
Preceded by Ann Meyer	9th District; 2023 – present	Succeeded by Incumbent
Preceded by Tedd Gassman	7th District; 2021 – 2023	Succeeded by Mike Sexton
