= Fimmen =

Fimmen is a surname. Notable people with the surname include:

- Edo Fimmen (1881–1942), Dutch trade unionist
- Kurt Fimmen, German World War II Navy commander
- Waldo Fimmen (1889–1968), American politician
