= Ross S. Whisler =

American politician

Member of the Iowa House of Representatives from the 3rd district
- In office January 11, 1965 – January 8, 1967
- Preceded by: Dewey Goode
- Succeeded by: Delmont Moffitt

Personal details
- Born: December 3, 1891 Udell, Iowa, United States
- Died: July 31, 1981 (aged 89) Mexico, Missouri, United States
- Party: Democratic
- Spouse: Lucille B. Whisler
- Children: Denny R. Whisler

Ross S. Whisler (December 3, 1891 – July 31, 1981) was an American politician from the state of Iowa.

Whisler was born in Udell, Appanoose County, Iowa in 1891. He served as a Democrat for one term in the Iowa House of Representatives from January 11, 1965, to January 8, 1967. Whisler died in his son's hometown of Mexico, Missouri, on July 31, 1981.

Iowa House of Representatives
Preceded by Dewey Goode	3rd district 1965–1967	Succeeded by Delmont Moffitt
