= Delmont Moffitt =

American politician (1911–2001)

Delmont T. Moffitt

Member of the Iowa House of Representatives from the 4th district 3rd (1967-1969); 96th (1971-1973)
- In office January 9, 1961 – January 13, 1963; January 14, 1963 – January 10, 1965; January 9, 1967 – January 12, 1969; January 11, 1971 – January 7, 1973
- Preceded by: Kenneth E. Owen
- Succeeded by: Horace J. Daggett

Personal details
- Born: Delmont Theodore Moffitt; December 21, 1911 Woodstock, Minnesota, United States
- Died: June 30, 2011 (aged 99) Centerville, Iowa, United States
- Party: Republican

Delmont T. Moffitt (December 21, 1911 – June 30, 2001) was an American politician from the state of Iowa.

Moffitt was born in Woodstock, Pipestone County, Minnesota in 1911. He served as a Republican in the Iowa House of Representatives from 1961 to 1965, 1967 to 1969, and 1971 to 1973. Moffitt died in Centerville, Iowa, in 2001.

Iowa House of Representatives
Preceded by Kenneth Owen	4th district 1961–1965	Succeeded by vacant
Preceded by Ross S. Whisler	3rd district 1967–1969	Succeeded by Dewey Goode
Preceded by Niels Nielsen	96th district 1971–1973	Succeeded by H. Daggett
