= Claude Gordy =

American politician

Member of the Iowa House of Representatives from the 3rd district
- In office January 12, 1959 – January 8, 1961
- Preceded by: Dewey Goode
- Succeeded by: Dewey Goode

Personal details
- Born: Claude Royce Gordy; December 24, 1931 Bloomfield, Iowa, U.S.
- Died: October 26, 1971 (aged 39) Bloomfield, Iowa, U.S.
- Party: Democratic
- Spouse: Hildred Wilkinson
- Children: 4
- Occupation: Teacher

Claude Royce Gordy (December 24, 1931 – October 26, 1971) was an American politician from the state of Iowa.

Gordy was born in Bloomfield, Iowa, in 1931. He served as a Democrat for one term in the Iowa House of Representatives from January 12, 1959 to January 8, 1961. Gordy died in Bloomfield in 1971.

Iowa House of Representatives
Preceded by Dewey Goode	3rd district 1959–1961	Succeeded by Dewey Goode
