= Dewey Goode =

American politician

Member of the Iowa Senate
- In office 1941–1945

Member of the Iowa House of Representatives
- In office 1933–1941; 1949–1959; 1961–1965; 1969–1972

Personal details
- Born: Dewey Emmitt Goode; June 2, 1898 Bloomfield, Iowa, United States
- Died: July 26, 1972 (aged 74) Bloomfield, Iowa, United States
- Party: Republican

Dewey Emmitt Goode (1898–1972) was an American politician from the state of Iowa. During a legislative career that spanned five decades, the Republican Goode served a total of 13 terms in the Iowa House of Representatives and one term in the Iowa State Senate.

== Biography ==
=== Early years ===
Dewey Emmitt Goode was born June 2, 1898, at Bloomfield, Iowa, in 1898 to Mr. and Mrs. L.E. Goode. The elder Goode ran a produce company in Bloomfield, for whom Dewey later worked, together with his brother.

Goode married the former Zona McIntire in Bloomfield on June 10, 1917.

=== Career ===
Early in 1932, the 31-year old Goode announced his candidacy for a seat in the Iowa General Assembly under the banner of the Republican Party. The primary was contested, being joined by J.F. Johnson, a local farmer. Goode emerged victorious and was assigned to seats on the Judiciary and Liquor Control committees in the forthcoming Iowa legislature.

Goode would subsequently gain re-election to three more consecutive terms, winning electoral mandates in the elections of November 1934, 1936, and 1938. During his early time in the legislature as a member of the Republican minority, Goode was known for efforts to curb costs of state government by limiting the salaries and expense accounts of state employees and for his regular opposition to action of the state liquor commission, over which he had a legislative role of oversight.

The Republicans won control of the Assembly in the election of 1938, and Goode was appointed chair of the House Rules committee. In this capacity Goode worked to shorten the length, and thus lower the cost, of Iowa legislative sessions by imposing an early deadline for the introduction of new legislation, a date which was to be moved to the last legislative day of February. Goode was also appointed in March to a special bipartisan committee established to "winnow" some 500 pending bills to identify those meriting further consideration during the final weeks of the legislative session.

In 1940, Goode ran for election to the Iowa State Senate, winning the race and serving a single four-year term.

Goode was returned to the Iowa legislature in November 1948, beginning a series of five more consecutive terms to office. He would leave the assembly early in 1959 following a defeat in 1958, but regained a seat in November 1960, with his tenure extended by re-election in 1962.

Out of the legislature again after early 1965, Goode was the winner of two more terms of office in November 1968 and 1970, with his district boundaries being changed in the latter race as the result of the 1970 federal census. Goode was named chair of the House Transportation Committee for the annual sessions of 1971 or 1972, but failing health prevented him from participating in the final legislative session.

=== Death and legacy ===
Goode died on March 26, 1972, at the Davis County Hospital in Bloomfield following a long illness. He was 73 years old at the time of his death.

Goode was the majority floor leader for the Republicans during three legislative sessions and was House Speaker pro tempore for one session.

At the time of his death, Goode's 30 years of service in the Iowa legislature was the third longest tenure in state history, behind the 32-year careers of fellow Republicans Frank Byers and Arch McFarlane.

== Footnotes ==
Iowa House of Representatives
Preceded by Samuel Randolph	3rd district 1933–1941	Succeeded by Waldo Fimmen
Iowa Senate
Preceded by Hugh Guernsey	3rd district 1941–1945	Succeeded by James R. Barkley
Iowa House of Representatives
Preceded by Waldo Fimmen	3rd district 1949–1959	Succeeded by Claude Gordy
Preceded by Claude Gordy	3rd district 1961–1965	Succeeded by Ross S. Whisler
Preceded by Delmont Moffitt	3rd district 1969–1971	Succeeded by Irvin Bergman
Preceded by Irvin Bergman	98th district 1971–1972	Succeeded by L. Schroeder
