= Dieken =

Dieken is a surname. Notable people with the surname include:

- Doug Dieken (born 1949), American football player and commentator
- Zach Dieken (born 1990), American police officer and politician
