= Robert Driesen =

American politician

Member of the Iowa House of Representatives from the 3rd district
- Member-elect
- Assumed office January 1, 2027
- Preceded by: Thomas Jeneary

Personal details
- Party: Republican

Robert Driesen is an American politician. A member of the Republican Party, he was elected to the Iowa House of Representatives in 2026, representing the 3rd district. He succeeded fellow Republican Thomas Jeneary in the 2026 election. Driesen is from Ireton, Iowa. He was the member service director for North West Rural Electric Cooperative in Orange City, Iowa.
