= Iowa's 5th House of Representatives district =

American legislative district

House District 5
- Type: District of the Lower house
- Location: Iowa
- Representative: Zach Dieken
- Parent organization: Iowa General Assembly

The 5th District of the Iowa House of Representatives in the state of Iowa. It is currently composed of Osceola and O'Brien Counties, as well as part of Cherokee and Buena Vista Counties.

== Current elected officials ==
Zach Dieken is the representative currently representing the district.

== Past representatives ==
The district has previously been represented by:

- Rollin Edelen, 1971–1973
- Lester Menke, 1973–1983
- Donald Paulin, 1983–1989
- Bradly Banks, 1989–1993
- Lee J. Plasier, 1993–1995
- Kenneth Veenstra, 1995–1999
- Dwayne Alons, 1999–2003
- Royd Chambers, 2003–2013
- Chuck Soderberg, 2013–2015
- Chuck Holz, 2015–2018
- Thomas Jeneary, 2019–2023
- Zach Dieken, 2023–2027
