= Waldo Fimmen =

American politician (1899–1968)

Member of the Iowa House of Representatives from the 3rd district
- In office January 13, 1941 – January 9, 1949
- Preceded by: Dewey Goode
- Succeeded by: Dewey Goode

Personal details
- Born: Waldo Ralph Fimmen; June 3, 1899 Des Moines County, Iowa, U.S.
- Died: May 20, 1968 (aged 68) Bloomfield, Iowa, U.S.
- Party: Republican
- Spouse: Mildred Wharton
- Education: University of Iowa (J.D.)
- Occupation: Attorney (Fimmen and Stephens, Law Offices)

Waldo Ralph Fimmen (June 3, 1899 – May 20, 1968) was an American politician.

Fimmen was born June 3, 1899, in Des Moines County, Iowa, to Henry Fimmen and Lily Westling. He graduated from Burlington High School in 1917. Fimmen married Mildred Wharton in 1931. He served as a Republican in the Iowa House of Representatives from 1941 to 1949. Fimmen died May 20, 1968, in Bloomfield.

Iowa House of Representatives
Preceded by Dewey Goode	3rd district 1941–1949	Succeeded by Dewey Goode
