= Harold Easterly Davidson =

American politician (1891–1971)

Member of the Iowa House of Representatives from the 9th district
- In office January 13, 1919 – January 9, 1921

Personal details
- Born: March 1, 1891 Olin, Iowa, U.S.
- Died: January 21, 1971 (aged 79)
- Party: Republican
- Spouse: Thelma Cheese (m. 1924)
- Children: 2
- Education: Drake University
- Occupation: Politician

Harold Easterly Davidson (March 1, 1891 – January 21, 1971) was an American politician.

Harold Easterly Davidson was a native of Olin, Iowa, born to parents Harold E. Davidson and Allie Easterly Davidson on March 1, 1891. He attended high school in his hometown before enrolling at the Drake University College of Liberal Arts. At Drake, he played football and ran track as a sprinter. After completing his undergraduate degree, Davidson was employed by Milwaukee Road for one year. He then obtained a degree from the Drake University Law School and passed the bar in 1916. Davidson settled in Clarinda, where he practiced law alongside former classmate Elwood Leaf. The partnership successively included W. F. Stipe, Davidson's brother Forrest, and son Richard, who worked with William C. Hemphill.

Davidson, a Republican, served one term on the Iowa House of Representatives for District 9 from 1919 to 1921. His political career continued after he left the state legislature. Davidson was elected to the mayoralty of Clarinda in 1925, 1927, and 1939. He chaired the Page County Republican Party from 1928 to 1936. Davidson contested the office of Iowa Attorney General later that year, and lost to John H. Mitchell. From 1939, he was legal counsel for the Iowa Commerce Commission. He left the position in 1943 and was elevated to a judgeship in the fifteenth judicial district, from which he retired in 1966. Davidson died on January 21, 1971.
