= Ingwer Hansen =

American politician (1912–2000)

Member of the Iowa House of Representatives from the 3rd district
- In office January 8, 1973 – January 9, 1983
- Preceded by: Irvin L. Bergman
- Succeeded by: Leo P. Miller

Personal details
- Born: August 8, 1912 Hartley, Iowa
- Died: February 7, 2000 (aged 87) Hartley, Iowa
- Party: Republican

Ingwer L. Hansen (August 8, 1912 – February 7, 2000) was an American politician who sat in the Iowa House of Representatives from the 3rd district from 1973 to 1983. He began working for the United States Postal Service in 1930, was in the United States Army during World War II from 1944 to 1946, returned to USPS after military service, and retired in 1972.
