= Lee J. Plasier =

American politician and businessman (born 1942)

Leroy James Plasier (born September 21, 1942) is an American business manager and politician, having served in the Iowa State House of Representatives from 1987 until 1995.

== Early life ==
Plasier was born on September 21, 1942, in Hull, Iowa, the son of Henry and Genevieve Plasier. Plasier graduated from Western Christian High School in Hull, Iowa, and later earned a B.A. from Calvin College in Grand Rapids, Michigan, in 1966.

== Career ==
Plasier worked as a manager and stockholder of a plumbing and heating wholesale business. He previously served as manager and stockholder of a mechanical contracting company. His professional background also includes managing an office for the General Electric Credit Corporation and working with a mobile home sales company in Fremont, Michigan. He is a past president of the Jaycees, vice president of his church council and the Handicap Village board. He was also a member and past president of the local chapter of the Association for Public Justice.

He served in the Iowa State House of Representatives as a Republican for eight years; his first six years (1987–1993) in Iowa's 6th district, and his last two years (1993–1995) in Iowa's 5th district. During his time in the legislature, he was chairman of various Chamber of Commerce committees. In the 6th district, he was succeeded by WWII veteran Richard Vande Hoef. In the 5th district, he was succeeded by businessman Kenneth Veenstra.

== Elections ==
=== 1986 ===
In the Republican primary for Iowa's 6th House of Representatives district, Plasier ran against Robert M. Dunlop and Clifton Wjerda. The incumbent representative, Wilmer Rensink, was retiring to run for a seat in the Iowa Senate. Plasier won the primary against Dunlop and Wjerda. In the general election, he did not have a Democratic challenger. He was elected with 7,223 votes, and had zero opposition.

=== 1988 ===
In 1988, he sought re-election. He won the Republican primary. In the general election, he did not have a Democratic challenger. He was elected with 9,711 votes, and had zero opposition.

=== 1990 ===
In 1990, he sought re-election. He won the Republican primary. In the general election, he did not have a Democratic challenger. He was elected with 8,150 votes, and had zero opposition.

=== 1992 ===
Following state redistricting, in 1992, Plasier sought re-election in Iowa's 5th district, instead of Iowa's 6th district. He won the primary. In the general election, he did not have a Democratic challenger. He was elected with 10,472 votes, and had zero opposition.

He did not seek re-election in 1994, and was succeeded by Republican Kenneth Veenstra.

== Personal life ==
He married Roselyn (Posey) K. Meyer on April 12, 1969. They have three children: Michael, Eric, and Timothy.
