= Iowa's 9th House of Representatives district =

American legislative district

House District 9
- Type: District of the Lower house
- Location: Iowa
- Representative: Henry Stone
- Parent organization: Iowa General Assembly

The 9th District of the Iowa House of Representatives in the state of Iowa. It is currently composed of Emmet and Winnebago Counties, as well as part of Kossuth County.

== Current elected officials ==
Henry Stone is the representative currently representing the district.

== Past representatives ==
The district has previously been represented by:

- Harold Easterly Davidson, 1919–1921
- Delbert L. Trowbridge, 1971–1973
- Del Stromer, 1973–1983
- Ruhl Maulsby, 1983–1993
- Thomas H. Miller, 1993–1995
- Dan Huseman, 1995–2003
- George Eichhorn, 2003–2007
- McKinley Bailey, 2007–2011
- Stewart Iverson, 2011–2013
- Helen Miller, 2013–2019
- Ann Meyer, 2019–2023
