= Donald Paulin =

American politician (born 1933)

Donald J. Paulin

Member of the Iowa House of Representatives from the 5th district
- In office January 10, 1983 – January 8, 1989

Personal details
- Born: October 29, 1933 (age 92) Plymouth County, Iowa, U.S.
- Party: Republican
- Spouse: Ramona
- Children: 5
- Parent(s): E.O. Paulin; Ruth James Paulin
- Education: Westmar College
- Occupation: Politician, businessman

Military service
- Allegiance: United States
- Branch/service: United States Navy
- Years of service: 1952–1956
- Battles/wars: Korean War

Donald J. Paulin (born October 29, 1933) is a retired American politician and businessman.

Born in Plymouth County, Iowa, Paulin graduated from Union Consolidated High School. He served in the United States Navy during the Korean War. He attended Westmar University for three years. Paulin was a kitchen cabinet retailer and president of a building materials company. Paulin served as mayor of Le Mars, Iowa. From 1983 to 1989, Paulin served in the Iowa House of Representatives and was a Republican.
