= Dennis Bush =

American politician

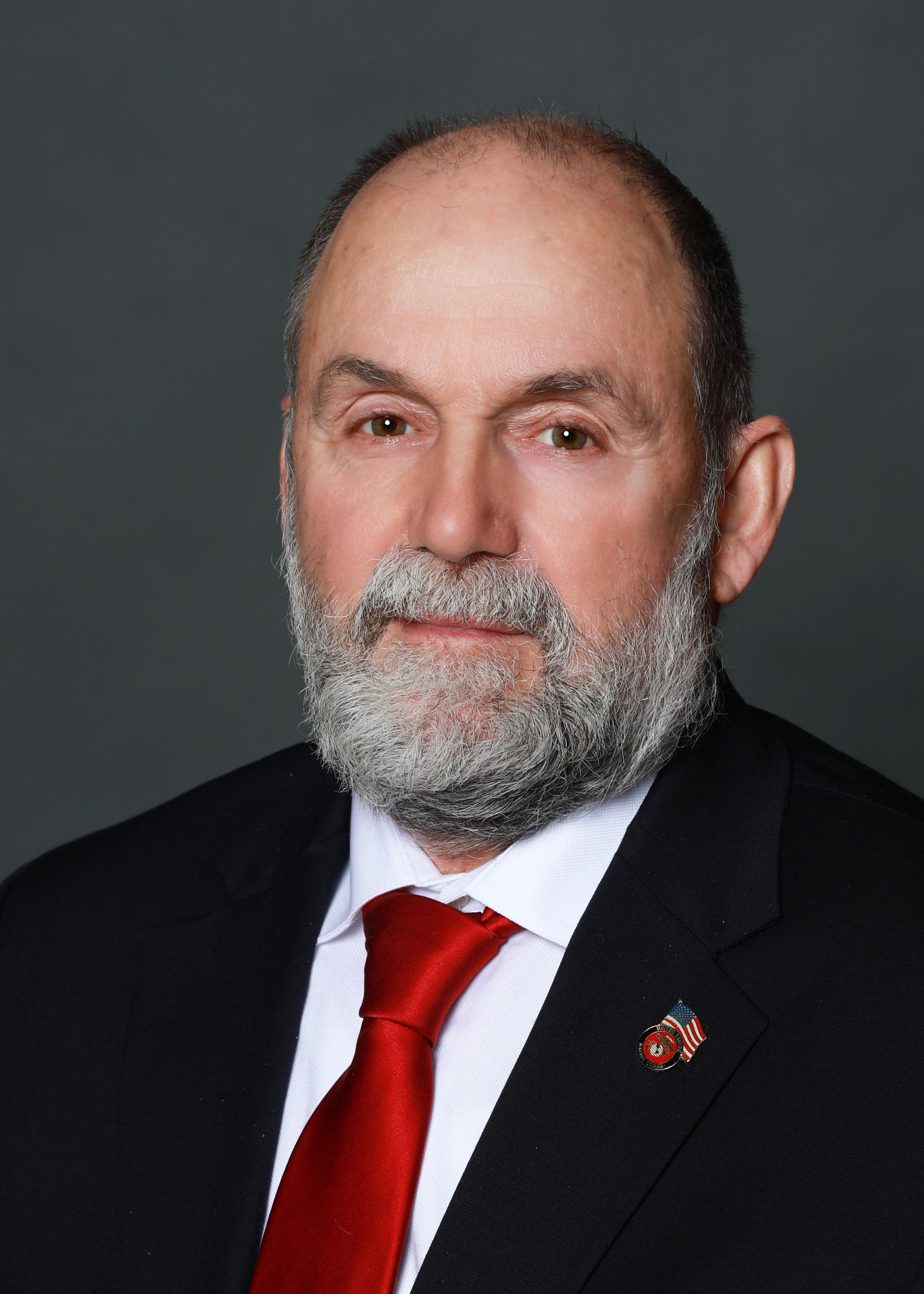
- Bush in 2021

Member of the Iowa House of Representatives from the 3rd district
- In office January 11, 2021 – January 9, 2023
- Preceded by: Dan Huseman
- Succeeded by: Thomas Jeneary

Personal details
- Born: Cherokee County, Iowa, U.S.
- Party: Republican
- Occupation: Farmer

Dennis Bush (born c. 1951) is an American politician from Iowa.

== Early life and career ==
Bush is a Cherokee County native who graduated from Meriden-Cleghorn High School in 1969, and was in the United States Marine Corps between 1971 and 1973. He married Deb in 1973 and they had two children, Randy and Nathan.

== Political career ==
In 2012, Bush contested the second district seat of the Cherokee County board of supervisors. Bush, a Republican candidate, defeated the Democratic incumbent Larry Prunty. Bush won a second term as county supervisor in 2016. He vacated his seat in 2020 to campaign for the Iowa General Assembly and was succeeded as county supervisor by Bryan Peterson.

In January 2020, Bush announced that he would run for the Third District seat in the Iowa House of Representatives. The seat was held by the long time representative Dan Huseman, who stated that he would retire. Bush defeated Lynn Evans and Mark McHugh in a Republican Party primary election held on June 2, 2020. Bush ran unopposed in the 2020 general election. Unofficial results for the 2020 general election showed that Bush won over 12,000 votes, or 99 percent of ballots cast. As a result of redistricting, and a move from Cleghorn to Cherokee, Bush ran for the open House District 5 during the 2022 election cycle. He finished ahead of the paralegal Thomas Kuiper in the 2022 Republican Party primary, but behind the Iowa State Patrol officer Zachary Dieken, who was endorsed by Kim Reynolds.
