= O. Kay Henderson =

American pundit

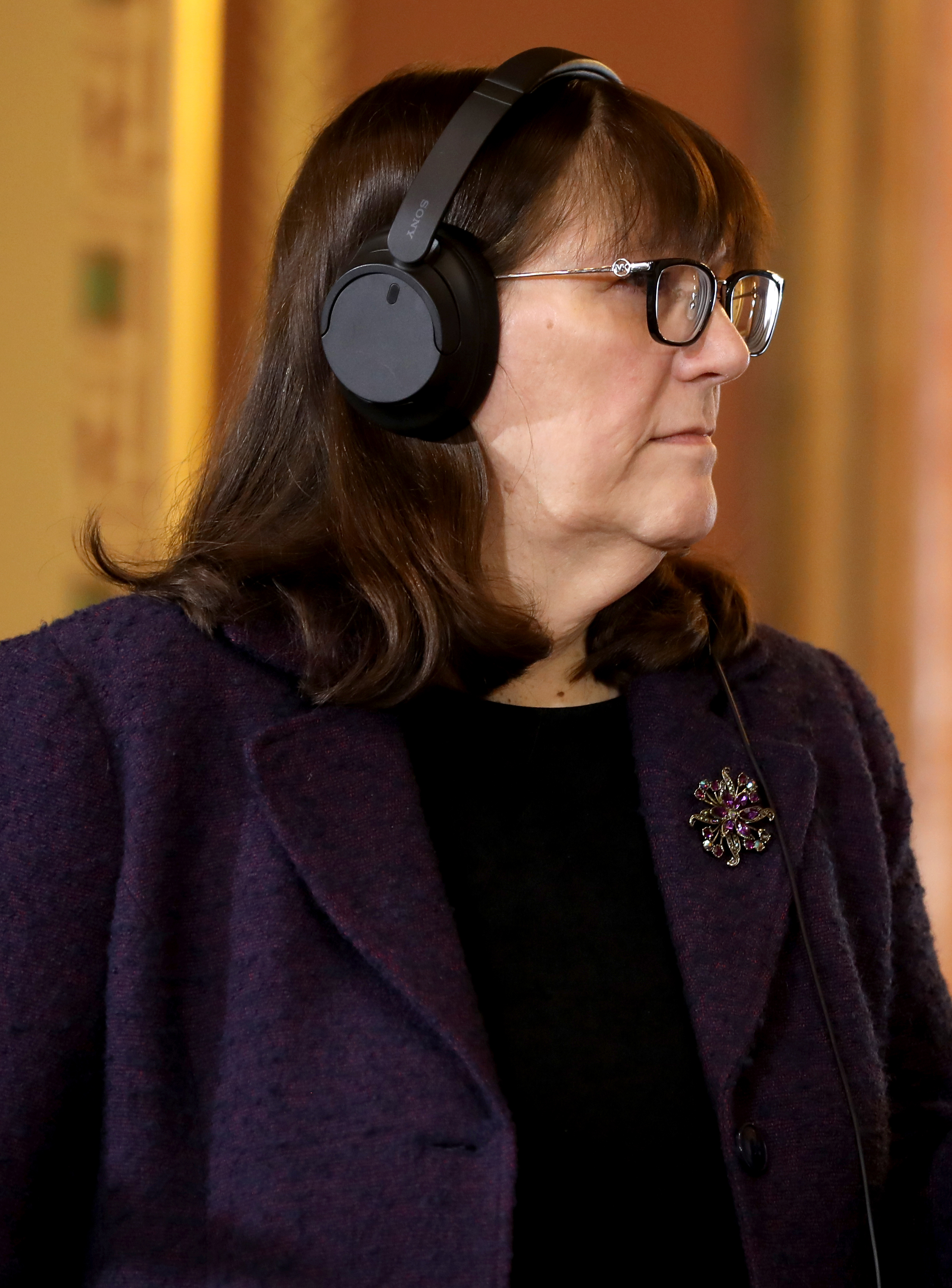
- Henderson in 2024
- Born: Onette Kay Henderson
- Other name: Kay Henderson
- Occupations: Political news director and reporter
- Years active: 1987 – present

O. Kay Henderson (born November 3, 1964) is an American political news director and reporter. She has worked with Radio Iowa since 1987 and has won the 2002 Jack Shelley Award. She became the first female host of Iowa Press on September 17, 2021.

== Career ==
Henderson was a director of national political news in Iowa, Missouri, Minnesota, and Wisconsin. She spent two terms as the National Association of State Radio Networks' news directors' group president. Her career with Radio Iowa began in 1987 as a reporter. In 2002, Henderson won the Jack Shelley Award from the Iowa Broadcast News Association. She has also been on PBS NewsHour, Meet the Press on NBC, This Week on ABC, CNN, Fox News, and MSNBC.

Henderson has been the news director of Radio Iowa for over 20 years and has reported on the Iowa presidential caucuses, including interviewing presidential candidates. Christi Parsons of the Chicago Tribune said that presidential candidates take Henderson "pretty seriously" with Tommy Vietor, a spokesman for Barack Obama during his 2008 campaign, saying, "She's the voice of Iowa". Vietor also said, "If you want to deliver a message and you're not talking to Kay, you're not doing it effectively." National news media consider Henderson to be an Iowa political authority. She is the Iowa Capitol press corps dean and has been an Iowa Press guest panelist. In 2021, Henderson took over the role of host for the public affairs show Iowa Press from David Yepsen. Her host debut was on September 17, 2021. Over the show's run for 50 years, Henderson is the first female host.

== Personal life ==
Henderson was born on November 3, 1964, the day of the 1964 United States presidential election in which Lyndon B. Johnson won the presidency in a landslide; her father had spent the day counting ballots as an election judge and her mother voted from her hospital room. Her parents allowed her siblings to name her, and "Onette Kay," or "Okay," was chosen. Her father, Guy Henderson, worked for the Farm Bureau. Henderson attended Iowa State University.
