= Thomas Jeneary =

American politician from Iowa

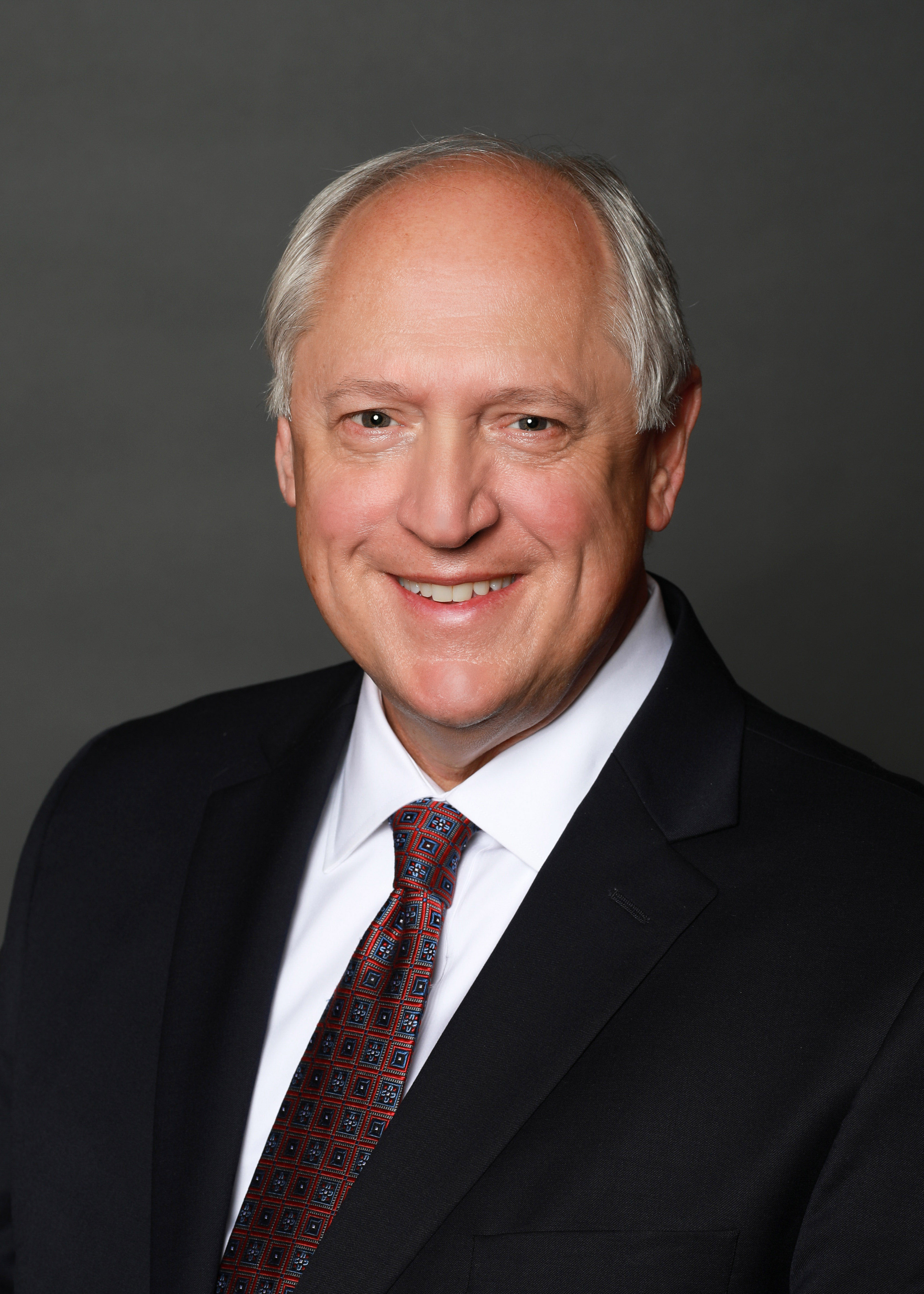
- 2021 Legislative Portrait

Member of the Iowa House of Representatives from the 3rd district
- Incumbent
- Assumed office January 9, 2023
- Preceded by: Dennis Bush
- Succeeded by: Robert Driesen (elect)

Member of the Iowa House of Representatives from the 5th district
- In office January 14, 2019 – January 8, 2023
- Preceded by: Chuck Holz
- Succeeded by: Zach Dieken

Personal details
- Born: March 31, 1952 (age 74) Des Moines, Iowa, U.S.
- Party: Republican
- Education: University of Iowa
- Profession: Dentist, funeral director
- Website: Representative Jeneary

Thomas Michael Jeneary (born March 31, 1952) is an American politician, retired dentist and former funeral director serving in the Iowa House of Representatives from the 3rd district since 2023. A Republican was elected to the Iowa House of Representatives in 2018, representing the 5th district from 2019 to January 8, 2023. He was reelected from the 3rd district in 2022 and again in 2024. In January 2026, Jeneary announced that he would not seek re-election and would retire at the end of the 2026 legislative session.

He was born in Des Moines, Iowa and attended West Liberty High School in West Liberty, IA. He received his B.A. from the University of Iowa. He graduated from the Dallas Institute of Mortuary Science and received his Doctor of Dental Surgery degree from the University of Iowa College of Dentistry.

Jeneary is a retired dentist and funeral director. He was formerly the Vice Chair of the Iowa Board of Dental Examiners.

Jeneary resides in Le Mars, Iowa with his wife, Pam, and two sons.

Iowa House of Representatives
| Preceded by Dennis Bush | 3rd District; 2023 – present | Succeeded by Incumbent |
| Preceded by Chuck Holz | 5th District; 2019 – 2023 | Succeeded by Zach Dieken |
