= Iowa's 6th House of Representatives district =

American legislative district

House District 6
- Type: District of the Lower house
- Location: Iowa
- Representative: Megan Jones
- Parent organization: Iowa General Assembly

The 6th District of the Iowa House of Representatives in the state of Iowa is composed of parts of Clay and Buena Vista counties.

== Representatives ==
The district has been represented by:

- Berl E. Priebe, 1971–1973
- Dennis L. Freeman, 1973–1975
- Keith Baker, 1975–1979
- Richard L. Groth, 1979–1983
- Wilmer Rensink, 1983–1987
- Lee J. Plasier, 1987–1993
- Richard P. Vande Hoef, 1993–1999
- David Johnson, 1999–2003
- Greg Stevens, 2003–2005
- Mike May, 2005–2011
- Jeff Smith, 2011–2013
- Ron Jorgensen, 2013–2017
- Jim Carlin, 2017–2018
- Jacob Bossman, 2018–2023
- Megan Jones, 2023-
