= Chuck Holz =

American politician (born 1952)

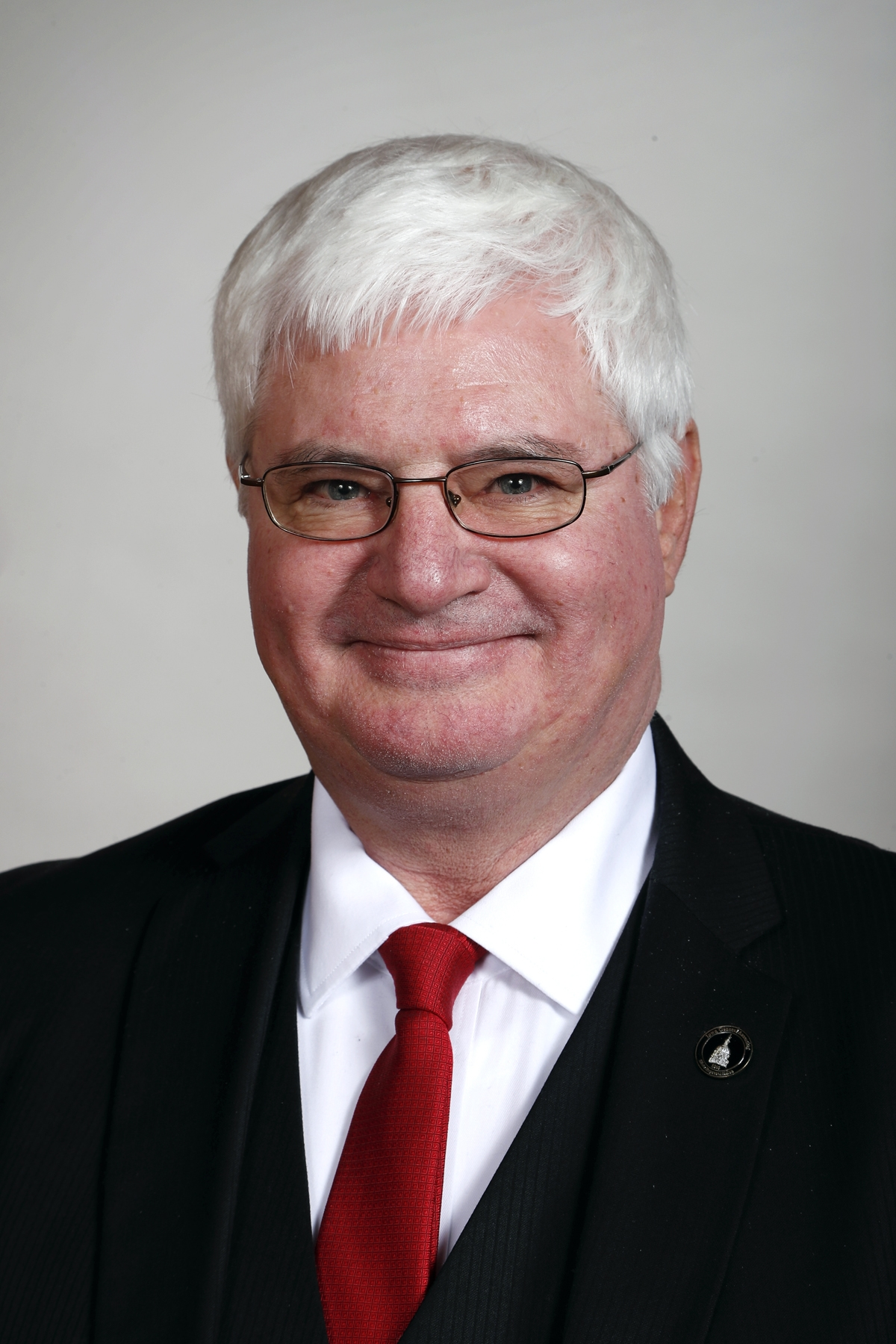

Member of the Iowa House of Representatives from the 5th district
- In office December 2, 2015 – 2018
- Preceded by: Chuck Soderberg
- Succeeded by: Thomas Jeneary

Personal details
- Born: 1952 (age 73–74)
- Party: Republican
- Spouse: Pat
- Children: Joshua, Christopher, Daniel
- Education: Iowa State University
- Profession: retired veterinarian
- Website: legis.iowa.gov/...

Chuck Holz (born 1952) is a Republican member of the Iowa House of Representatives, representing the 5th district. Wheeler was first elected in a November 3, 2015 special election held to fill a vacancy created when Republican Representative Chuck Soderberg resigned upon moving out of district for a new job.

Holz was a member of the Le Mars School Board for 18 years, including 2 years as board president.

== Electoral history ==
Election	Political result	Candidate	Party	Votes	%
Iowa House of Representatives special election, 2015; District 5 Turnout: 1,550	Republican hold	Chuck Holz	Republican	1,536	99.10%
Iowa House of Representatives special election, 2015; District 5 Turnout: 1,550	Republican hold	Write-In		14	0.90%
Iowa House of Representatives elections, 2016; District 5 Turnout: 15,228	Republican hold	Chuck Holz	Republican	11,774	77.32%
Iowa House of Representatives elections, 2016; District 5 Turnout: 15,228	Republican hold	Patrick Ritz	Democratic	3,445	22.62%
Iowa House of Representatives elections, 2016; District 5 Turnout: 15,228	Republican hold	Write-In		9	0.06%
