= Zach Dieken =

American politician

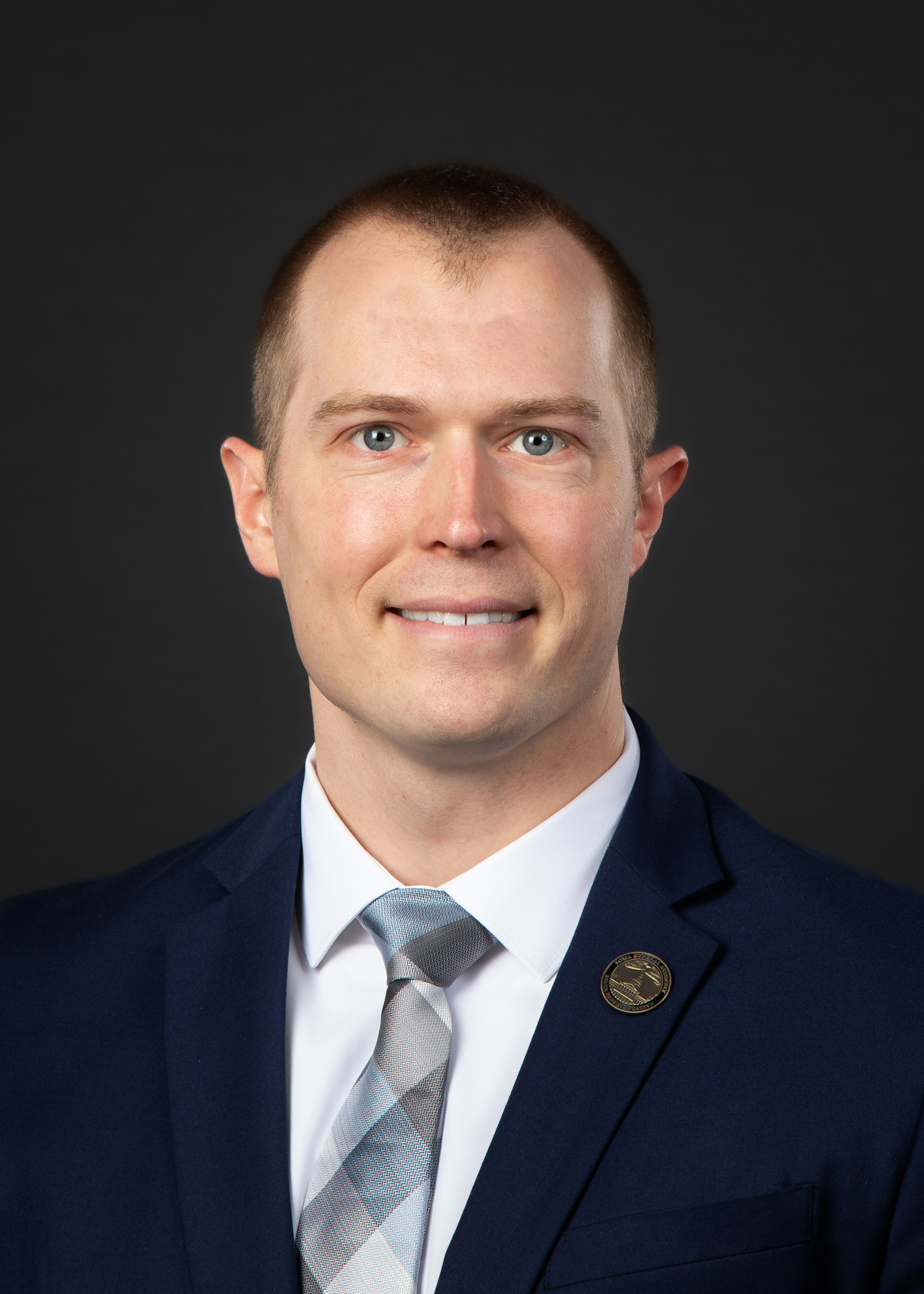
- Dieken in 2023

Member of the Iowa House of Representatives from the 5th district
- Incumbent
- Assumed office January 9, 2023
- Preceded by: Tom Jeneary

Personal details
- Born: 1990 (age 35–36) Minneapolis, Minnesota, U.S.
- Party: Republican
- Education: Northwestern College

Zachary Dieken is an American politician. He currently represents District 5 in the Iowa House of Representatives and serves as an Iowa State Patrol Trooper. In late 2025, he announced he would not be seeking reelection.

== Biography ==
Dieken was born in 1990 in Minneapolis and graduated from George–Little Rock Senior High School, where he played baseball. He received a bachelor's degree in sociology and criminal justice from Northwestern College in 2012. Prior to being elected to the Iowa House of Representatives, Dieken worked as a state patrol trooper and a substitute teacher. As of March 2025, media outlets reported that he still served as a state patrol trooper.

Dieken lives in Granville, Iowa. He and his wife Megan have three children.

== Political career ==
Dieken announced his intention to run in the Republican primary to represent the newly created fifth district of the Iowa House of Representatives on November 15, 2021. He ran as a strong conservative, emphasizing his support for a private school voucher program which incumbent Dennis Bush opposed. Since taking office, he has been described as among the most conservative state legislators in Iowa. Dieken received an endorsement from Governor Kim Reynolds, and won the June 7, 2022 primary with 55.8% of the vote, beating Bush and Tom Kuiper.

Dieken ran unopposed in the November 8, 2022 general election and took office January 9, 2023. In 2024, he won re-election, beating independent candidate Michael Schnoes with 77.8% of the vote.

He serves as vice chair of the Environmental Protection committee and as a member of the Agriculture and Public Safety committees. Dieken has sponsored bills to increase requirements for CO_{2} pipeline expansions, to amend the Iowa constitution to forbid same-sex marriage, and to require pre-birth child support.

In 2024, Dieken said that cities and counties should set property taxes in defiance of state law, citing the "doctrine of the lesser magistrates." This statement was criticized by local government officials and newspapers. In January 2025, Dieken introduced a bill to better define tailgating.

In December 2025, Dieken announced that he would not be seeking reelection in 2026.
