= Royd Chambers =

American politician (born 1961)

Royd E. Chambers
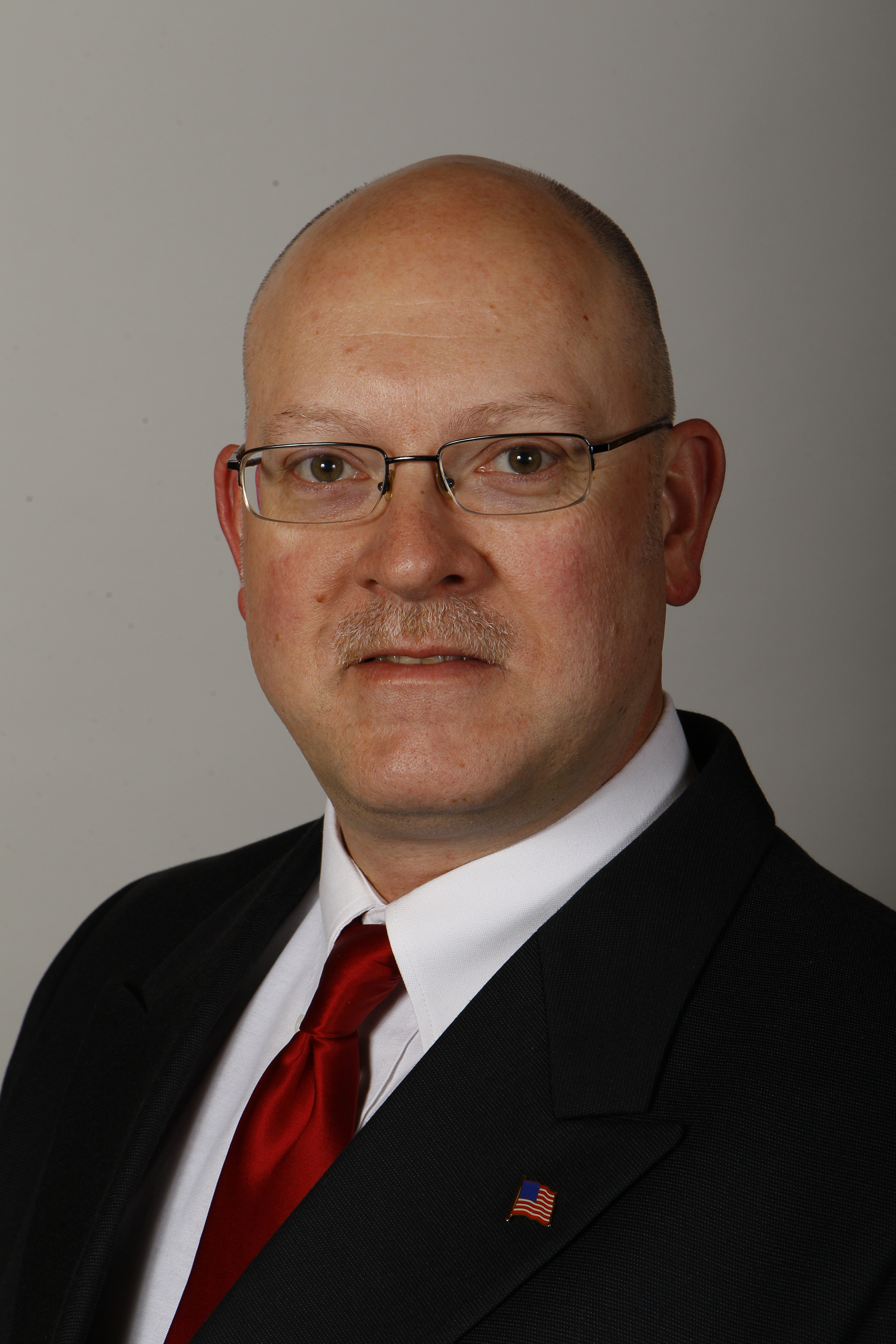

Member of the Iowa House of Representatives from the 5th district
- In office January 13, 2003 – January 13, 2013
- Preceded by: Dwayne Alons
- Succeeded by: Chuck Soderberg

Personal details
- Born: June 28, 1961 (age 65) Adair County, Iowa, U.S.
- Party: Republican
- Website: legis.iowa.gov/...

Royd E. Chambers (born June 28, 1961, in Adair County, Iowa) was the Iowa State Representative from the 5th District. He served in the Iowa House of Representatives from 2003 through 2013.

Chambers served on several committees in the Iowa House – the Appropriations committee; the Education committee; the Labor committee; and the Veterans Affairs committee. He also served as ranking member of the Education Appropriations Subcommittee.

Chambers was re-elected in 2006 with 7,736 votes, running unopposed.

== Education ==
Chambers graduated from Bridgewater-Fontanelle High School. He obtained his B.A. from Buena Vista University.

== Organizations ==
Chambers is a member of the following organizations:

- Iowa Air National Guard
- Sheldon Christian Retirement Home Board of Directors
- O'Brien County Farm Bureau
- Iowa Pork Producers
- O'Brien County Sportsman Club
- Osceola County Sportsman Club
- Clay County Pheasants Forever
- National Muzzle Loading Rifle Association
- National Field Archery Association
- National Wild Turkey Federation
- National Rifle Association of America
- Sheldon American Legion Post #145
- Sheldon United Methodist Church

== Family ==
Chambers is married to his wife Barb and together they have a son, Jacob, and a daughter, Sarah.

Iowa House of Representatives
Preceded by Dwayne Alons	5th District; 2003–2013	Succeeded by Chuck Soderberg
