= Chuck Soderberg =

American politician

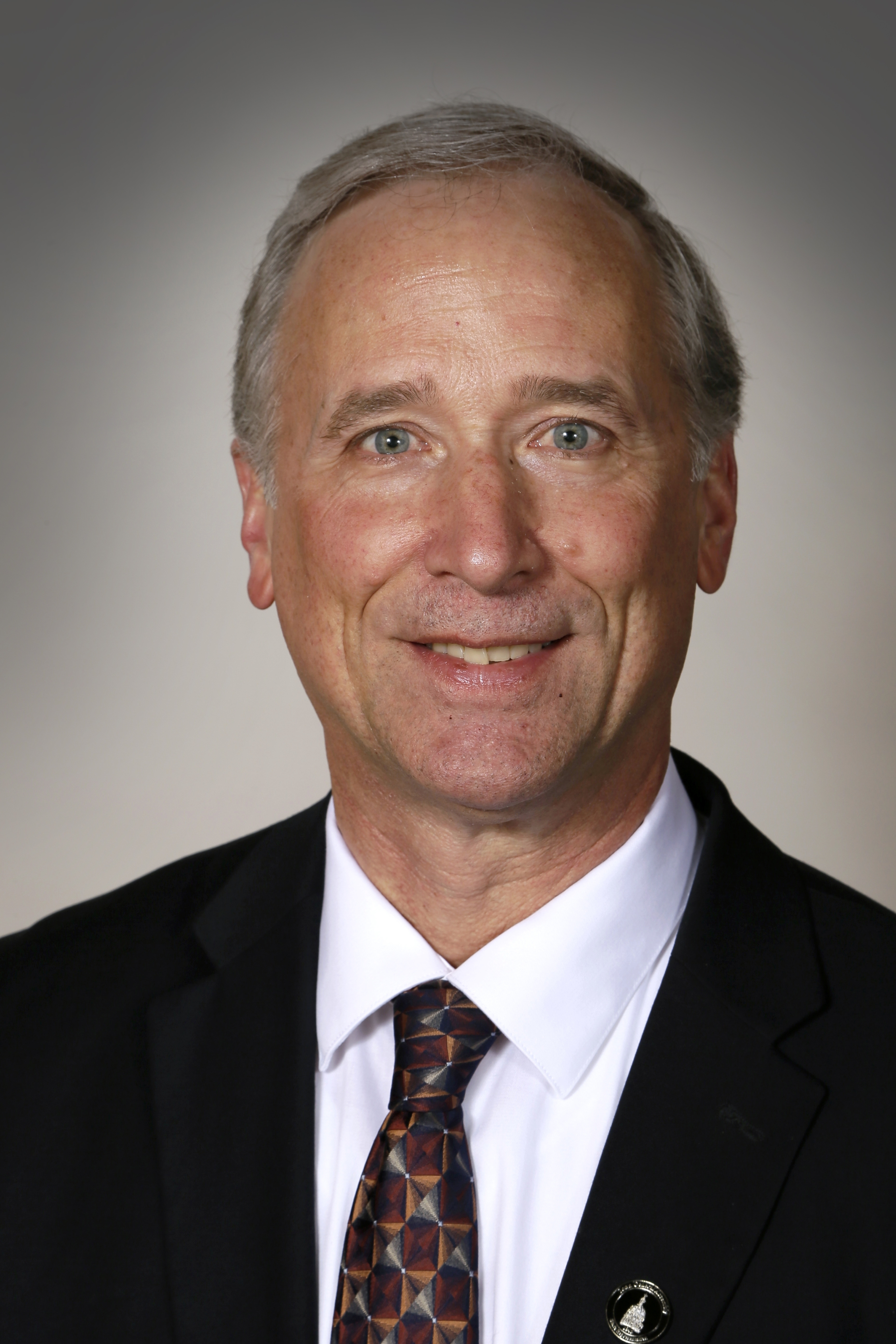

Member of the Iowa House of Representatives from the 5th district 3rd (2005–2013)
- In office January 10, 2005 – September 14, 2015
- Preceded by: Ralph Klemme
- Succeeded by: Chuck Holz

Personal details
- Born: May 24, 1957 (age 69) Burt, Iowa, U.S.
- Party: Republican
- Spouse(s): Linda, Dawn
- Children: 2 children.
- Education: Westmar College
- Occupation: Executive Vice President, Iowa Association of Rural Electric Cooperatives
- Website: legis.iowa.gov/...

Chuck Soderberg (born May 24, 1957) was the Iowa State Representative from the 5th District. He served in the Iowa House of Representatives from 2005 through 2015. Soderberg was born in Burt, Iowa. He has a B.A. in education from Westmar College.

As of January 2013, Soderberg serves on several committees in the Iowa House – Commerce and Environmental Protections committees. He also serves as the chair of the Appropriations Committee.

Soderberg has been employed by the energy cooperative Northwest Iowa Power Cooperative for the past 24 years and is currently vice president of Planning and Legislative Services at NIPCO.

== Biography ==
Soderberg was first elected to the House in 2004. Chuck is the Vice-President of Planning for Northwest Iowa Power Cooperative. He was born on May 24, 1957, in Algona, Iowa. His father, Gerald, and mother, Beryl, were dairy farmers. Chuck has one brother and three sisters.

Soderberg grew up near the town of Burt, Iowa. He graduated from the Burt Community School District in 1975. Following high school graduation, he attended one year at Iowa Lakes Community College then transferred to Westmar College in Le Mars. He graduated from Westmar in 1979.

Soderberg has two children, Leah, living in St. Paul, MN, and Andrew, living in Seattle, WA.

Soderberg and his wife, Dawn, attend the Calvin Christian Reform Church in Le Mars.

Prior to becoming elected to the House, Soderberg served on the Le Mars City Council from 1998 to 2004. He has served on several boards, including the Siouxland Interstate Metropolitan Planning Council, Le Mars Business Initiative Corporation, and the Le Mars Chamber of Commerce. In addition, he serves on the St. Luke’s Hospital Foundation Board where he helped raise money for the Children’s Miracle Network. He is a past little league coach, and fundraiser for the American Cancer Society, American Heart Association and Habitat for Humanity.

In 2008, Soderberg promoted a book, along with four of his House colleagues, which rejects the notion that human activity impacts global warming.

== Electoral history ==
*incumbent

3rd District contests

Election	Political result	Candidate	Party	Votes	%
Iowa House of Representatives primary elections, 2004; District 3 Turnout: 4,811	Republican	Chuck Soderberg	Republican	2,912	60.53%
Iowa House of Representatives primary elections, 2004; District 3 Turnout: 4,811	Republican	Kent Schwiesow	Republican	1,894	39.37%
Iowa House of Representatives general elections, 2004; District 3	Republican hold	Chuck Soderberg	Republican	unopposed	
Iowa House of Representatives primary elections, 2006; District 3	Republican	Chuck Soderberg*	Republican	unopposed	
Iowa House of Representatives general elections, 2006; District 3	Republican hold	Chuck Soderberg*	Republican	unopposed	
Iowa House of Representatives primary elections, 2008; District 3	Republican	Chuck Soderberg*	Republican	unopposed	
Iowa House of Representatives general elections, 2008; District 3 Turnout: 13,847	Republican hold	Chuck Soderberg*	Republican	10,456	75.51%
Iowa House of Representatives general elections, 2008; District 3 Turnout: 13,847	Republican hold	T.J. Templeton	Democratic	3,283	23.71%
Iowa House of Representatives primary elections, 2010; District 3	Republican	Chuck Soderberg*	Republican	unopposed	
Iowa House of Representatives general elections, 2010; District 3	Republican hold	Chuck Soderberg*	Republican	unopposed	

Election	Political result	Candidate	Party	Votes	%
Iowa House of Representatives primary elections, 2012; District 5	Republican	Chuck Soderberg	Republican	unopposed	
Iowa House of Representatives general elections, 2012; District 5	Republican (newly redistricted)	Chuck Soderberg*	Republican	unopposed	

Iowa House of Representatives
Preceded by Ralph Klemme	3rd District; 2005–2013	Succeeded by Dan Huseman
Preceded by Royd Chambers	5th District; 2013–2015	Succeeded by Chuck Holz
