= Dan Huseman =

American politician (born 1952)

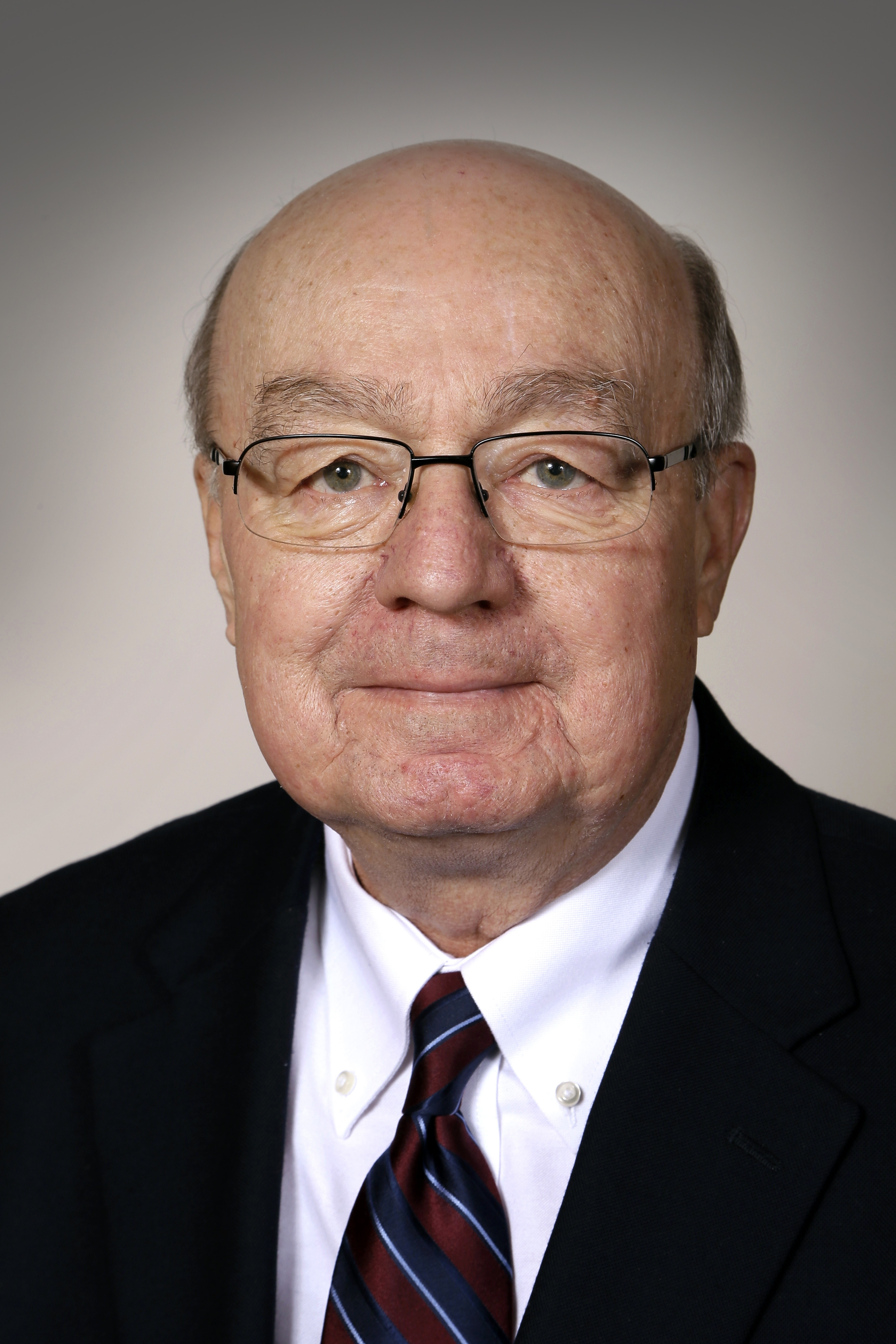

Member of the Iowa House of Representatives from the 3rd district 53rd (2003–2013) 9th (1995–2003)
- In office January 9, 1995 – January 10, 2021
- Preceded by: Tom Miller
- Succeeded by: Dennis Bush

Personal details
- Born: June 28, 1952 (age 74) Cherokee, Iowa, U.S.
- Party: Republican
- Education: Buena Vista College
- Occupation: Farmer
- Website: legis.iowa.gov/...

Daniel Adair Huseman (born June 28, 1952) is an American politician. A Republican, he has served in the Iowa House of Representatives since 1995. He was born in Cherokee and received his BA from Buena Vista College. Huseman announced in January 2020 that he would retire from the state house upon the conclusion of his thirteenth term in office.

Huseman and his wife Barbara raised three children.

== Electoral history ==
9th District contests

Election	Political result	Candidate	Party	Votes	%
Iowa House of Representatives primary elections, 1994; District 9 Turnout: 4,661	Republican	Dan Huseman	Republican	3,248	69.68%
Iowa House of Representatives primary elections, 1994; District 9 Turnout: 4,661	Republican	Richard C. Waterbury	Republican	1,410	30.25%
Iowa House of Representatives general elections, 1994; District 9	Republican hold	Dan Huseman	Republican	unopposed	
Iowa House of Representatives primary elections, 1996; District 9	Republican	Dan Huseman*	Republican	unopposed	
Iowa House of Representatives general elections, 1996; District 9	Republican hold	Dan Huseman*	Republican	unopposed	
Iowa House of Representatives primary elections, 1998; District 9	Republican	Dan Huseman*	Republican	unopposed	
Iowa House of Representatives general elections, 1998; District 9	Republican hold	Dan Huseman*	Republican	unopposed	
Iowa House of Representatives primary elections, 2000; District 9	Republican	Dan Huseman*	Republican	unopposed	
Iowa House of Representatives general elections, 2000; District 9	Republican hold	Dan Huseman*	Republican	unopposed	

53rd District contests

Election	Political result	Candidate	Party	Votes	%
Iowa House of Representatives primary elections, 2002; District 53	Republican	Dan Huseman*	Republican	unopposed	
Iowa House of Representatives general elections, 2002; District 53; Turnout: 8,724	Republican (newly redistricted)	Dan Huseman*	Republican	6,025	69.06%
Iowa House of Representatives general elections, 2002; District 53; Turnout: 8,724	Republican (newly redistricted)	Bob Byers	Independent	2,690	30.83%
Iowa House of Representatives primary elections, 2004; District 53	Republican	Dan Huseman*	Republican	unopposed	
Iowa House of Representatives general elections, 2004; District 53; Turnout: 14,687	Republican hold	Dan Huseman*	Republican	8,773	59.73%
Iowa House of Representatives general elections, 2004; District 53; Turnout: 14,687	Republican hold	Dick Sokolowski	Democratic	5,910	40.24%
Iowa House of Representatives primary elections, 2006; District 53	Republican	Dan Huseman*	Republican	unopposed	
Iowa House of Representatives general elections, 2006; District 53	Republican hold	Dan Huseman*	Republican	unopposed	
Iowa House of Representatives primary elections, 2008; District 53	Republican	Dan Huseman*	Republican	unopposed	
Iowa House of Representatives general elections, 2008; District 53; Turnout: 14,635	Republican hold	Dan Huseman*	Republican	8,532	58.30%
Iowa House of Representatives general elections, 2008; District 53; Turnout: 14,635	Republican hold	Lori Sokolowski	Democratic	6,094	41.64%
Iowa House of Representatives primary elections, 2010; District 53	Republican	Daniel Huseman*	Republican	unopposed	
Iowa House of Representatives general elections, 2010; District 53	Republican hold	Daniel Huseman*	Republican	unopposed	

Election	Political result	Candidate	Party	Votes	%
Iowa House of Representatives primary elections, 2012; District 3	Republican	Dan Huseman*	Republican	unopposed	
Iowa House of Representatives general elections, 2012; District 3	Republican (newly redistricted)	Dan Huseman*	Republican	unopposed	

Iowa House of Representatives
Preceded by Thomas Miller	9th District; 1995–2003	Succeeded by George Eichhorn
Preceded by Dick Taylor	53rd District; 2003–2013	Succeeded by Sharon S. Steckman
Preceded by Chuck Soderberg	3rd District; 2013–present	Succeeded by Incumbent
