= Iowa's 3rd House of Representatives district =

American legislative district

House District 3
- Type: District of the Lower house
- Location: Iowa
- Representative: Thomas Jeneary
- Parent organization: Iowa General Assembly

The 3rd District of the Iowa House of Representatives in the state of Iowa is composed of parts of Sioux and Plymouth counties.

== Representatives ==
The district has been represented by:

- Irvin L. Bergman, 1971–1973
- Ingwer L. Hansen, 1973–1983
- Leo P. Miller, 1983–1985
- Don Shoning, 1985–1993
- Christopher Rants, 1993–2003
- Ralph Klemme, 2003–2005
- Chuck Soderberg, 2005–2013
- Dan Huseman, 2013–2021
- Dennis Bush, 2021–2023
- Thomas Jeneary, 2023–2027
- Robert Driesen, 2027
