= Chris Hagenow =

American attorney and politician

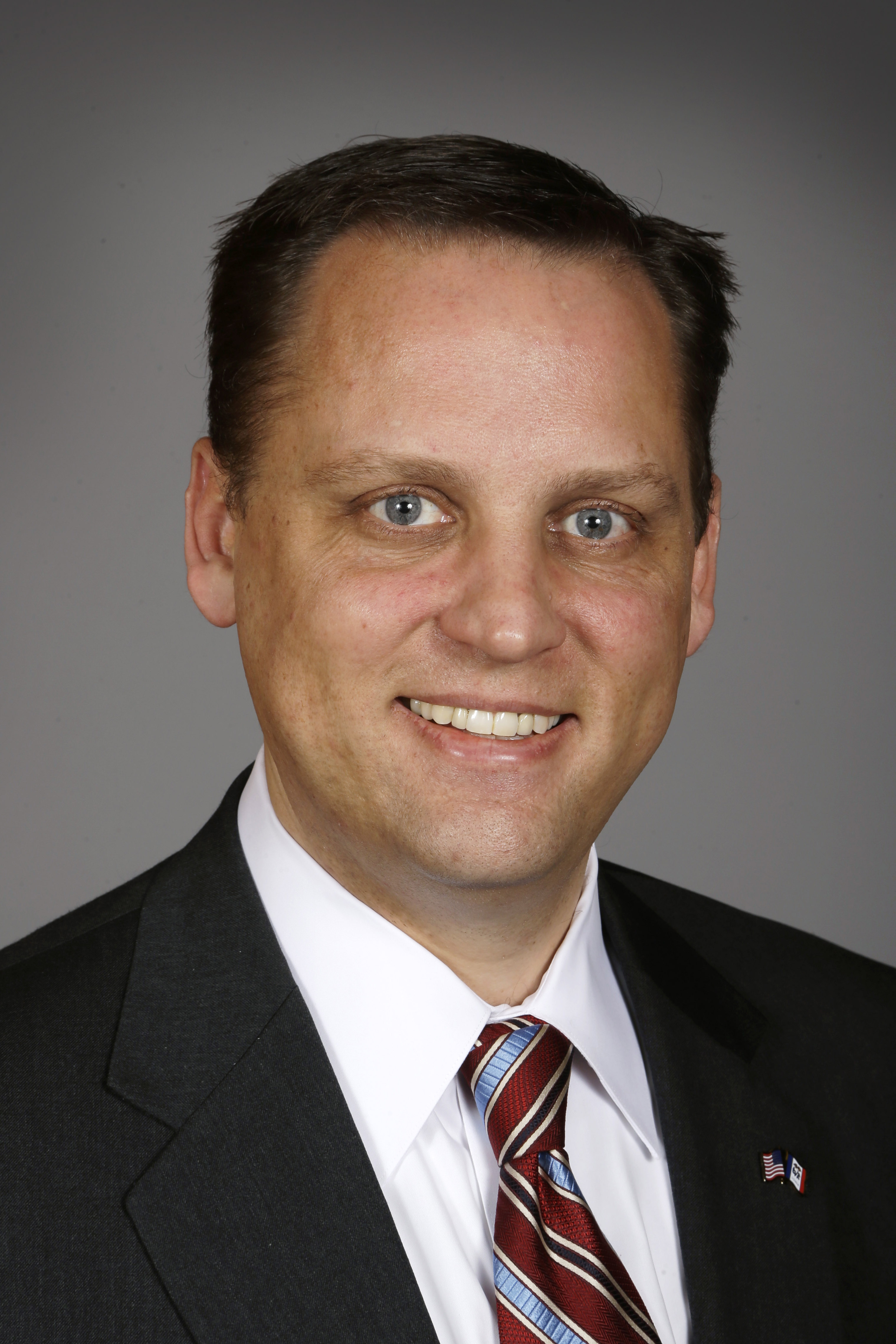

Majority Leader of the Iowa House of Representatives
- In office January 14, 2016 – January 13, 2020
- Preceded by: Linda Upmeyer
- Succeeded by: Matt Windschitl

Member of the Iowa House of Representatives from the 19th district 43rd (2013–2019) 59th (2009–2013)
- In office January 2009 – January 2021
- Preceded by: Dan Clute
- Succeeded by: Carter Nordman

Personal details
- Born: January 19, 1972 (age 54) St. Charles, Missouri, U.S.
- Party: Republican
- Spouse: Amanda
- Children: 3
- Education: University of Northern Iowa (BA); University of Iowa (JD)
- Website: Campaign website

Chris Hagenow (born January 19, 1972) is an American attorney and politician who served as a member of the Iowa House of Representatives from 2009 to 2021.

Hagenow served as majority leader for the Republican caucus and also served on the Administration and Rules, Judiciary, Legislative Council, State Government, and Ways and Means committees.

== Early life and education ==
Hagenow grew up in Cedar Falls, Iowa. He graduated from Price Laboratory School and magna cum laude from the University of Northern Iowa with a bachelor's degree in 1994. Hagenow earned a J.D. degree from the University of Iowa College of Law in 1997 and became a member of the Iowa State Bar Association.

== Career ==
He is a founding partner of the Des Moines law firm Whitaker, Hagenow & Gustoff, LLP.

Hagenow was first elected to the Iowa House in 2008 and as of 2017 has been serving his fourth term, representing House District 43. Following the 2012 election, Hagenow was elected House majority whip for the 85th General Assembly. He previously served as the chairman as the House Government Oversight Committee. Hagenow was a member of the Ways and Means, Judiciary, State Government and Administration and Rules committees. Following the 2015 legislative session and Speaker Kraig Paulsen's resignation as speaker of the House, Majority Leader Linda Upmeyer was elected to replace Paulsen with Hagenow being elected as Majority Leader starting in the 2016 legislative session. It is estimated that Mr. Hagenow spent over $420,000 to hold his seat during the 2016 election. In 2018, following incumbent Representative Ralph Watts' retirement, Hagenow moved and was elected to represent House District 19 located in Dallas and Polk counties.

=== 2008 ===
Hagenow ran for Iowa House of Representatives in the 2008 elections for District 59. In the Republican primary election, he defeated Susan Murphy.

District 59 Republican Primary Election	Percentage	Votes
Chris Hagenow	58%	734
Susan Murphy	42%	536
Total	100%	1,271

In the general election he defeated Democratic candidate, and Mayor of Windsor Heights, Jerry Sullivan.

District 59 Election	Percentage	Votes
Chris Hagenow (R)	50%	8,240
Jerry Sulivan (D)	50%	8,147
Write-ins	0%	21
Total	100%	16,408

=== 2010 ===
Hagenow ran for Iowa House of Representatives in the 2010 elections representing District 59. He defeated Democratic candidate Andrew McDowell.

District 59 Election	Percentage	Votes
Chris Hagenow (R)	58%	7,650
Andrew McDowell (D)	42%	5,510
Write-ins	0%	15
Total	100%	13,175

=== 2012 ===
Hagenow ran in the 2012 elections for Iowa House of Representatives representing District 43, due to redistricting. He defeated Democratic candidate Susan Judkins.

District 43 Election	Percentage	Votes
Chris Hagenow (R)	50%	8,741
Susan Judkins (D)	50%	8,719
Write-ins	0%	17
Total	100%	17,477

Initial reports on November 6, 2012 showed Hagenow ahead by 22 votes. On November 15, Judkins formally requested a recount, but she later halted the recount saying "Questions about whether all absentee ballots were counted have been satisfactorily answered and I believe my narrow loss would likely stand even if all ballots were considered."

=== 2014 ===
Hagenow ran for re-election in the 2014 elections for Iowa House of Representatives representing District 43. Hagenow defeated Democratic challenger Kim Robinson.

District 43 Election	Percentage	Votes
Chris Hagenow (R)	56%	7,589
Kim Robinson (D)	44%	5,911
Write-ins	0%	12
Total	100%	13,512

=== 2016 ===
Hagenow ran for re-election in the 2016 elections for Iowa House of Representatives representing District 43. Hagenow defeated Democratic challenger Jennifer Konfrst.

District 43 Election	Percentage	Votes
Chris Hagenow (R)	51.6%	8,798
Jennifer Konfrst (D)	48.4%	8,259
Total	100%	17,057

Iowa House of Representatives
Preceded by Linda Upmeyer	Majority Leader of the Iowa House of Representatives; 2016–2020	Succeeded by Matt Windschitl
