= Iowa's 47th House of Representatives district =

American legislative district

House District 47
- Type: District of the Lower house
- Location: Iowa
- Representative: Carter Nordman
- Parent organization: Iowa General Assembly

The 47th District of the Iowa House of Representatives in the state of Iowa. It is currently composed of Greene and Guthrie Counties, as well as part of Dallas County.

== Current elected officials ==
Carter Nordman is the representative currently representing the district.

== Past representatives ==
The district has previously been represented by:

- Nathan F. Sorg, 1971–1973
- Raburn G. Miller, 1973–1974
- Opal Louise Miller, 1975–1979
- Ruhl Maulsby, 1979–1983
- Myron B. Oxley, 1983–1987
- Mary Lundby, 1987–1993
- Barry Brauns, 1993–2003
- Ralph Watts, 2003–2013
- Chip Baltimore, 2013–2019
- Phil Thompson, 2019–2023
