= Iowa's 48th House of Representatives district =

American legislative district

House District 48
- Type: District of the Lower house
- Location: Iowa
- Representative: Chad Behn
- Parent organization: Iowa General Assembly

The 48th District of the Iowa House of Representatives in the state of Iowa. It is currently composed of Boone County, as well as part of Story County.

== Current elected officials ==
Chad Behn is the representative currently representing the district.

== Past representatives ==
The district has previously been represented by:

- Harold C. McCormick, 1971–1973
- Wayne D. Bennett, 1973–1983
- Darrell Hanson, 1983–1993
- James F. Hahn, 1993–2003
- Donovan Olson, 2003–2011
- Chip Baltimore, 2011–2013
- Robert Bacon, 2013–2023
- Phil Thompson, 2023–2025
- Chad Behn, 2025–Present
