= Zach Nunn =

American politician (born 1979)

- Official portrait, 2025

Member of the U.S. House of Representatives from Iowa's 3rd district
- Incumbent
- Assumed office January 3, 2023
- Preceded by: Cindy Axne

Member of the Iowa Senate from the 15th district
- In office January 14, 2019 – January 3, 2023
- Preceded by: Chaz Allen
- Succeeded by: Tony Bisignano

Member of the Iowa House of Representatives from the 30th district
- In office January 12, 2015 – January 14, 2019
- Preceded by: Joe Riding
- Succeeded by: Brian Lohse

Personal details
- Born: Zachary Martin Nunn; May 4, 1979 (age 47) Story City, Iowa, U.S.
- Party: Republican
- Spouse: Kelly Nunn
- Children: 6
- Education: Drake University (BA); Air University (MMAS); Selwyn College, Cambridge (MSt)
- Website: House website Campaign website

Military service
- Branch: United States Air Force; Iowa Air National Guard
- Service years: 2004–present
- Rank: Colonel
- Unit: 132nd Wing

Zachary Martin Nunn (born May 4, 1979) is an American politician and United States Air Force officer who has served as the U.S. representative for Iowa's 3rd congressional district since 2023. A member of the Republican Party, he was a member of the Iowa Senate for the 15th district from 2019 to 2023 and the Iowa House of Representatives for the 30th district from 2015 to 2019.

Nunn ran for a seat in the United States House of Representatives in 2022 to represent Iowa's 3rd congressional district, defeating incumbent Democrat Cindy Axne. He was re-elected in 2024, but lost reelection in 2026 to Democrat Sarah Trone Garriott.

== Early life and education ==
Nunn was born on May 4, 1979, in Story City, Iowa, to Curtis and Luann Nunn. He was raised in Altoona. He graduated from Southeast Polk High School in 1998, where he was named an All American Scholar.

He earned a Bachelor of Arts degree in political science and international relations from Drake University in 2002. While at Drake, he served as a senator in the student senate starting in 1999.

He earned a Master of Science in military operational art and science from the Air Command and Staff College at Air University in 2004 and a Master of Studies in international security from Selwyn College, Cambridge, in 2007.

== Career ==
=== Early career ===
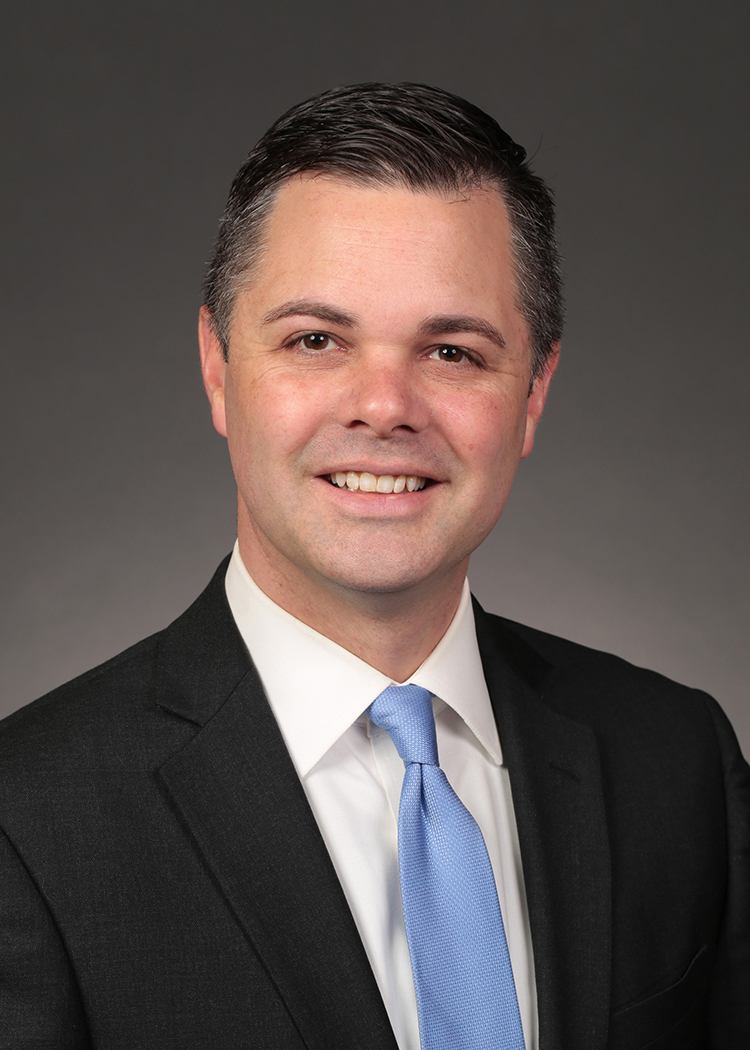
Nunn during his tenure as a state representative, 2017

Nunn was a member of the United States Air Force and later the Iowa Air National Guard since 2004. In 2021, he held the rank of lieutenant colonel and was commander of the 233rd Intelligence Squadron, 132nd Wing, Iowa Air National Guard. Nunn also worked as a cybersecurity consultant. On June 11, 2024, Nunn was promoted to the rank of colonel.

Nunn was a member of the research staff for Sir Peter Bottomley, a member of the British House of Commons, in 2002. He was a member of U.S. senator Chuck Grassley's legislative staff in 2004. Nunn was later director of cybersecurity policy for the United States National Security Council during the Obama administration.

=== Iowa Legislature ===
Nunn was a member of the Iowa House of Representatives from 2015 to 2019. He was a member of the Iowa Senate from 2019 to 2023.

== U.S House of Representatives ==
=== Elections ===
==== 2022 ====
In 2021, Nunn announced his candidacy for Iowa's 3rd congressional district in the 2022 election against incumbent Cindy Axne, the only Democrat in Iowa's congressional delegation. The 3rd district, which covers central Iowa, became more rural and conservative-leaning after the 2020 redistricting cycle, taking in nine new counties. The race was considered among the nation's most competitive House races. Nunn was endorsed by Donald Trump, Nikki Haley, and Tom Cotton, and easily won the June Republican primary election against two other candidates.

Nunn won the 2022 election against Cindy Axne, 50.3% to 49.6%.

==== 2024 ====
On Sunday, November 3, the Des Moines Register released the final Iowa Poll, which suggested that Iowans preferred the Democrat to the Republican at 48% to 41%.

Nunn won a second term, proving the Iowa Poll wrong. He defeated Democratic nominee Lanon Baccam, 51.9% to 48.1%.

=== Tenure ===
In April 2025, Nunn introduced bipartisan legislation designed to combat scams targeting older Americans. The Guarding Unprotected Aging Retirees from Deception Act, which is co-sponsored with Josh Gottheimer (D-New Jersey) and Scott Fitzgerald (R-Wisconsin), would give local law enforcement better access to tools to trace scammers' fraudulent activity.

Nunn also introduced the Social Security Overpayment Relief Act, which would limit the ability of the Social Security Administration (SSA) to recover money overpaid due to errors on the part of the SSA. The SSA would no longer be able to demand repayment of over payments more than ten years old unless there is associated fraudulent activity.

In May 2025, Nunn, along with Ayanna Pressley (D-MA) and Lauren Underwood (D-IL), introduced the bipartisan HEALTH for MOM Act, which aims to expand access to maternal healthcare in areas lacking maternity care.

On May 2, Nunn announced he was not running for governor, following Governor Kim Reynolds' announcement that she was retiring.

Rep. Nunn co-chairs the Congressional Caucus on Foster Youth.

=== Committee assignments ===
For the 119th Congress:

- Committee on Agriculture
  - Subcommittee on Commodity Markets, Digital Assets, and Rural Development
  - Subcommittee on General Farm Commodities, Risk Management, and Credit
- Committee on Financial Services
  - Subcommittee on Capital Markets
  - Subcommittee on National Security, Illicit Finance and International Financial Institutions
  - Subcommittee on Digital Assets, Financial Technology, and Artificial Intelligence
- Select Committee on the Strategic Competition Between the United States and the Chinese Communist Party

== Political positions ==
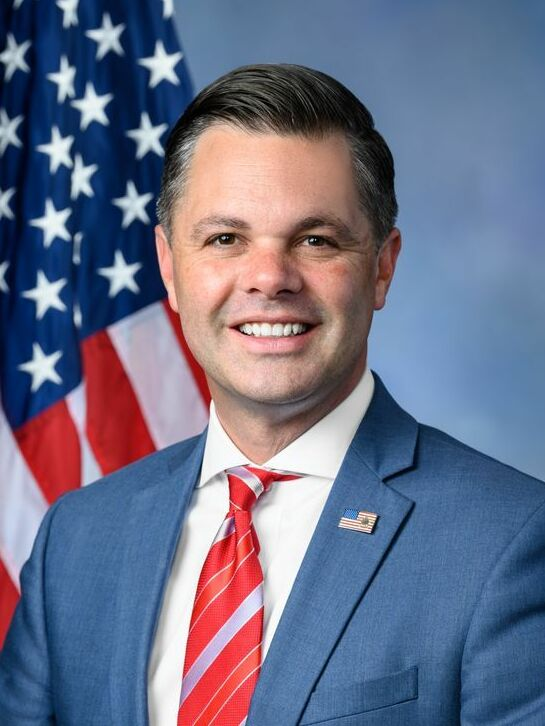
Rep. Nunn during the 118th Congress, 2023

Axios described Nunn as having "carved out a niche as a vocal moderate on key issues".

=== Abortion ===
Nunn opposes abortion with exceptions, including life of the mother, rape, and incest. Nunn opposes a federal ban on abortion and believes this policy should be left up to the states. He has said that anyone should have access to tools to start a family, including IVF, fertility treatments, and adoption.

=== Foreign policy ===
Nunn supports Trump in the 2026 Iran war, and has endorsed the nuclear rationale for the war. In April 2026, he stated that the war should not continue endlessly, and that it should be "resolved speedily". In June 2026, Nunn voted against a war powers resolution that would have limited President Trump's ability to wage war in Iran until congressional consent had been obtained.

=== Infrastructure ===
Nunn opposes the Bipartisan Infrastructure Act, and said there was far too much waste in the law.

=== January 6 ===
In an April 2022 appearance as a congressional candidate, Nunn said of the January 6 United States Capitol attack, "If a bunch of middle Americans can overwhelm our Capitol, and the Capitol police, who are funded to the tune of billions of dollars, can't stop a bunch of middle-aged individuals from walking onto the floor, we have a serious problem with our nation's security." He expressed disapproval of the United States House Select Committee on the January 6 Attack, terming it a "Nancy Pelosi committee determined to find someone that they can hang a noose around."

== Personal life ==
Nunn married Kelly in 2013 in Washington, D.C. It was her second marriage, and she had two children from her first marriage. Nunn and Kelly later had two children and adopted two sisters they had previously fostered.

== Electoral history ==
=== 2014 ===
Iowa's 30th House of Representatives district primary election, 2014
Party	Candidate	Votes	%
Republican	Zach Nunn	1,108	100.0
Total votes		1,108	100.0

Iowa's 30th House of Representatives district general election, 2014
Party	Candidate	Votes	%
Republican	Zach Nunn	7,323	56.00
Democratic	Joe Riding (incumbent)	5,733	44.00
Total votes		13,056	100.0
Republican gain from Democratic			

=== 2016 ===
Iowa's 30th House of Representatives district primary election, 2016
Party	Candidate	Votes	%
Republican	Zach Nunn (incumbent)	553	100.0
Total votes		553	100.0
Republican hold			

Iowa's 30th House of Representatives district general election, 2016
Party	Candidate	Votes	%
Republican	Zach Nunn (incumbent)	11,442	62.05
Democratic	Joe Riding	6,999	37.95
Total votes		18,441	100.0
Republican hold			

=== 2018 ===
Iowa's 15th Senate district primary election, 2018
Party	Candidate	Votes	%
Republican	Zach Nunn	737	89%
	Write-ins and undervotes	84	11%
Total votes		821	100%

Iowa's 15th Senate district general election, 2018
Party	Candidate	Votes	%
Republican	Zach Nunn	16,988	57.0
Democratic	Dan Nieland	12,830	43.0
Total votes		29,818	100.0
Republican gain from Democratic			

=== 2022 ===
Iowa's 3rd congressional district Republican primary, 2022
Party	Candidate	Votes	%
Republican	Zach Nunn	30,500	65.75
Republican	Nicole Hasso	8,996	19.39
Republican	Gary Leffler	6,802	14.66
Write-in		89	0.19
Total votes		46,387	100.0

Iowa's 3rd congressional district general election, 2022
Party	Candidate	Votes	%
Republican	Zach Nunn	156,262	50.26
Democratic	Cindy Axne (incumbent)	154,117	49.57
Write-in		534	0.17
Total votes		310,913	100.0
Republican gain from Democratic			

=== 2024 ===
Iowa's 3rd congressional district Republican primary, 2024
Party	Candidate	Votes	%
Republican	Zach Nunn (incumbent)	21,103	98.30
Write-in		365	1.70
Total votes		21,468	100.0

Iowa's 3rd congressional district general election, 2024
Party	Candidate	Votes	%
Republican	Zach Nunn (incumbent)	213,625	51.78
Democratic	Lanon Baccam	197,777	47.93
Write-in		1,197	0.29
Total votes		412,599	100.0

U.S. House of Representatives
Preceded by Cindy Axne	Member of the U.S. House of Representatives from Iowa's 3rd congressional district 2023–present	Incumbent
U.S. order of precedence (ceremonial)
Preceded by Kevin Mullin	United States representatives by seniority 341st	Succeeded by Andy Ogles
