= Edgewater Beach =

Edgewater Beach may refer to the following places:

- Edgewater Beach, Ontario
- Edgewater Beach, Wisconsin
- Edgewater Beach, a section of Edgewater, Chicago

== See also ==
- Edgewater Beach Hotel, hotel in Edgewater, Chicago
