= Dan Clute =

American politician (born 1966)

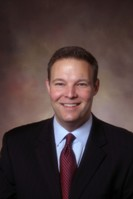

Member of the Iowa House of Representatives from the 59th district
- In office 2007–2009
- Preceded by: Gene Maddox
- Succeeded by: Chris Hagenow

Personal details
- Born: January 14, 1966 (age 60) Mason City, Iowa
- Party: Republican
- Spouse: None
- Children: Grant, Grayson
- Education: University of Iowa
- Occupation: Regional Business Development Executive, MidWestOne Financial Group
- Profession: Banking

Dan Clute (born January 14, 1966) represented the 59th District in the Iowa House of Representatives 2007–2009. He received his BBA (1988) and MBA (1989, with “First in Class” honors) from the University of Iowa, and is Market President at MidWestOne Financial Group

Clute was elected in 2006 with 7,250 votes (58%), defeating Democrat Jim Sammler. Mike Huckabee appeared at a campaign event for him 9 September 2009 in Clive. In the Iowa House, Clute served on the Commerce committee, the Economic Growth committee, the Local Government committee, and the Economic Development Appropriations Subcommittee. His campaign raised and spent money in 2007, but hardly at all in 2008; he was not a candidate for the Iowa General Assembly in 2008.

Before his election to the Iowa House he was elected to the Clive City Council in a special election in 2003 and to a four-year term in 2004. He began in politics at the age of ten years, and was a College Republican. After establishing his career in the Des Moines area, he joined the Bull Moose Club of young Republican professionals. He worked for George W. Bush's Iowa caucus effort in the 2000 Republican Party presidential primaries.

Mr. Clute was employed at Wells Fargo Financial (1989–2000) before joining the Citi Cards operations center in West Des Moines, Iowa. He has lived in Clive since 1997, and is a member of the Lions Club and Historical Society there. He was elected President of the Juvenile Diabetes Foundation's board of directors, and Vice President of the Greater Des Moines Habitat for Humanity's board. In 2003 he was named to the Des Moines Business Record’s “40 Under 40” list, and honored on 2004 with Mason City High School Distinguished Alumni Award – Alumnus of the Decade 1980’s.

Iowa House of Representatives
Preceded by Gene Maddox	59th District; 2007 – 2009	Succeeded by Chris Hagenow
