= Bay Settlement, Wisconsin =

- Unincorporated community
- Location within Wisconsin Location within the United States
- Coordinates: 44°33′11″N 87°53′26″W
- Country: United States
- State: Wisconsin
- County: Brown
- Town: Scott
- Elevation: 732 ft (223 m)
- Time zone: UTC-6 (Central (CST))
  - Summer (DST): UTC-5 (CDT)
- Area code: 920
- GNIS feature ID: 1561321

Bay Settlement is an unincorporated community located in the town of Scott, Brown County, Wisconsin, United States. Bay Settlement is located on the outskirts of Green Bay, 7 miles (11 km) east-northeast of the city's downtown.

== History ==
Bay Settlement is one of the oldest settlements in Wisconsin, as only Green Bay, De Pere, and Prairie du Chien were established earlier. The settlement had a population of eight people in 1830. The community is home to Holy Cross Church, one of the oldest Catholic congregations in the county, which succeeded a mission established at Bay Settlement in 1834.

Although settlers from eastern states began to move into the vicinity of Bay Settlement during the late 1830s and the 1840s, the area remained sparsely settled until the two decades following 1850. The increasing tide of immigrants into Wisconsin from the East and from Europe reached the peninsula in mid-century.

During the 1850s and 1860s, all the lands surrounding Bay Settlement were occupied, and the hamlet emerged as a focal point for institutional and commercial services. The original French-Indian and later American settlers were joined by Belgians, Dutch, Germans, and a few Irish, thus mixing the population in nationality and language.

In 1868, a post office opened in Bay Settlement.
