= Jean Nicolet =

French coureur des bois (1598–1642)

Jean Nicolet Sieur de Belleborne
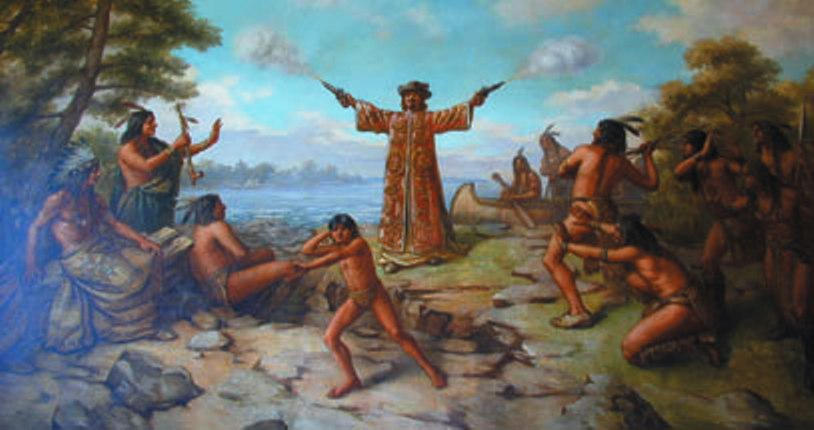
- Jean Nicolet, Franz Edward Rohrbeck, landing at the Bay of Green Bay in 1634.
- Born: 1598; Cherbourg, Cherbourg-en-Cotentin, Kingdom of France
- Died: 29 October 1642 (aged 43–44); Saint Lawrence River, Quebec City, New France
- Cause of death: Drowning
- Known for: first European to explore Lake Michigan first European to set foot in Wisconsin
- Children: Euphrosine-Madeleine Nicolet
- Parents: Thomas Nicollet (father); Marguerite de Lamer (mother)

Jean Nicolet (Nicollet), Sieur de Belleborne (French pronunciation: [ʒɑ̃ nikɔlɛ]; 1598 – 29 October 1642) was a French coureur des bois noted for discovering Lake Michigan, Mackinac Island, Green Bay, and being the first European to set foot in what is now the U.S. state of Wisconsin.

== Early life ==
Nicolet (Nicollet) was born in Cherbourg, France, in the late 1590s, the son of Thomas Nicollet, who was "messenger ordinary of the King between Paris and Cherbourg", and Marguerite de Lamer. They were members of the Roman Catholic Church. He was a known friend of Samuel de Champlain and Étienne Brule and was attracted to Canada to participate in Champlain's plan to train young French men as explorers and traders by having them live among Native Americans at a time when the French were setting up fur trading under the Compagnie des Marchands.

== Arrival at Quebec ==
In 1618, Nicolet immigrated to Quebec as a clerk to train as an interpreter for the Compagnie des Marchands, a trading monopoly owned by members of the French aristocracy. As an employee, Nicolet was a faithful supporter of the Ancien Régime.

To learn the language of the First Nations, Nicolet was sent to live with the Algonquins on an island, a friendly settlement located along the important Ottawa River fur trade route. Upon his return to Quebec in 1620, he was assigned to live among the Odawa and Algonquin people in the Lake Nipissing region. During his nine-year stay, he ran a store and traded with the native peoples in the area.

He had a relationship with a Nipissing woman, and they had a daughter, whom he named Euphrosine-Madeleine Nicolet. When Nicolet returned to Quebec, he brought his daughter with him to educate her among the French. On July 19, 1629, when Quebec fell to the Kirke brothers who took control for England, Nicolet fled to the safety of the Huron country. He worked from there against English interests until the French were restored to power. After Canada was restored to France he married Marguerite Couillard, the daughter of leading Quebec settler Guillaume Couillard and Marie-Guillemette Hébert, also the goddaughter of Champlain. The couple were residents of Trois-Rivières in later life, where they raised children.

== Exploration of Wisconsin ==
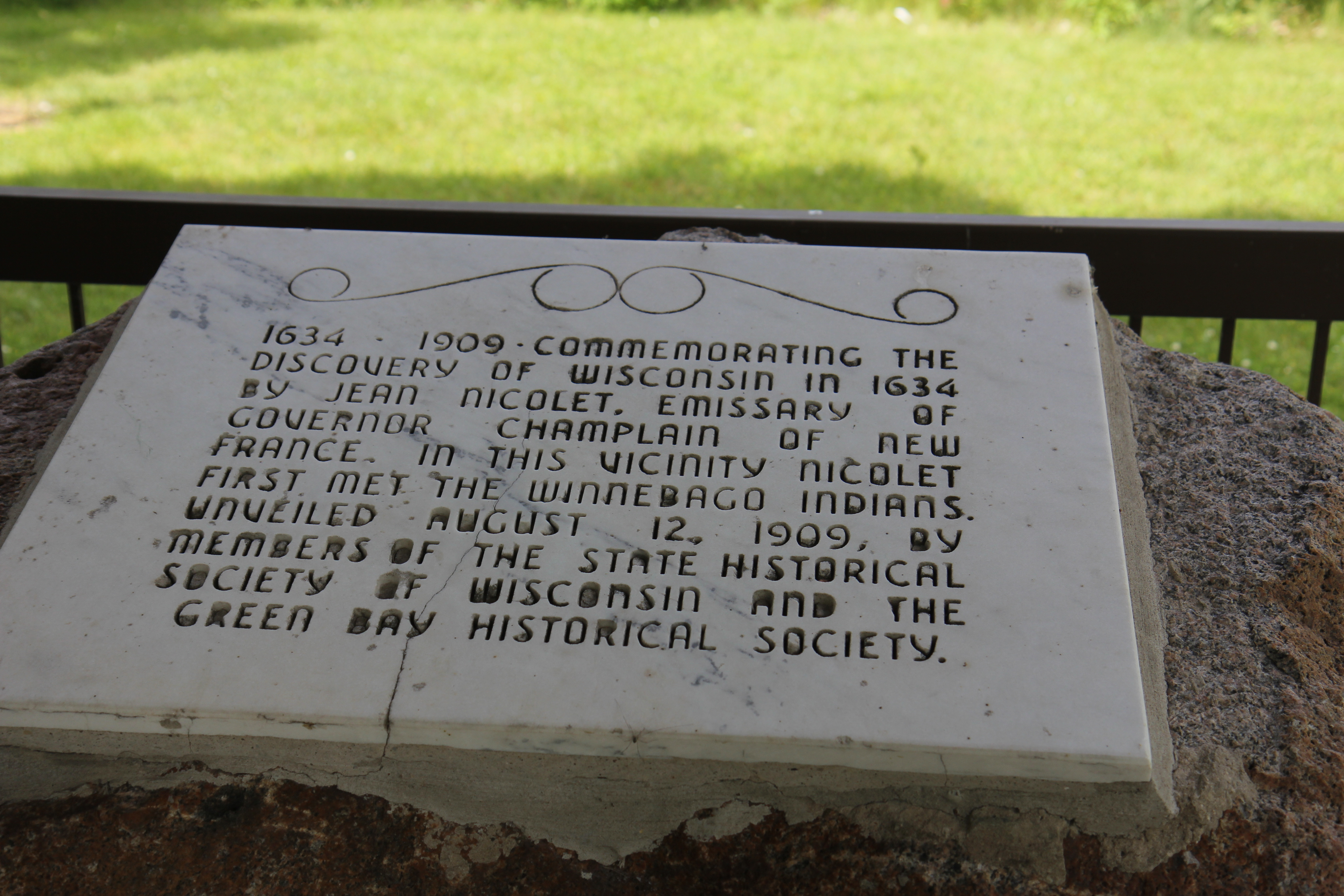
1909 plaque commemorating Nicolet's landing in Red Bank, Wisconsin.

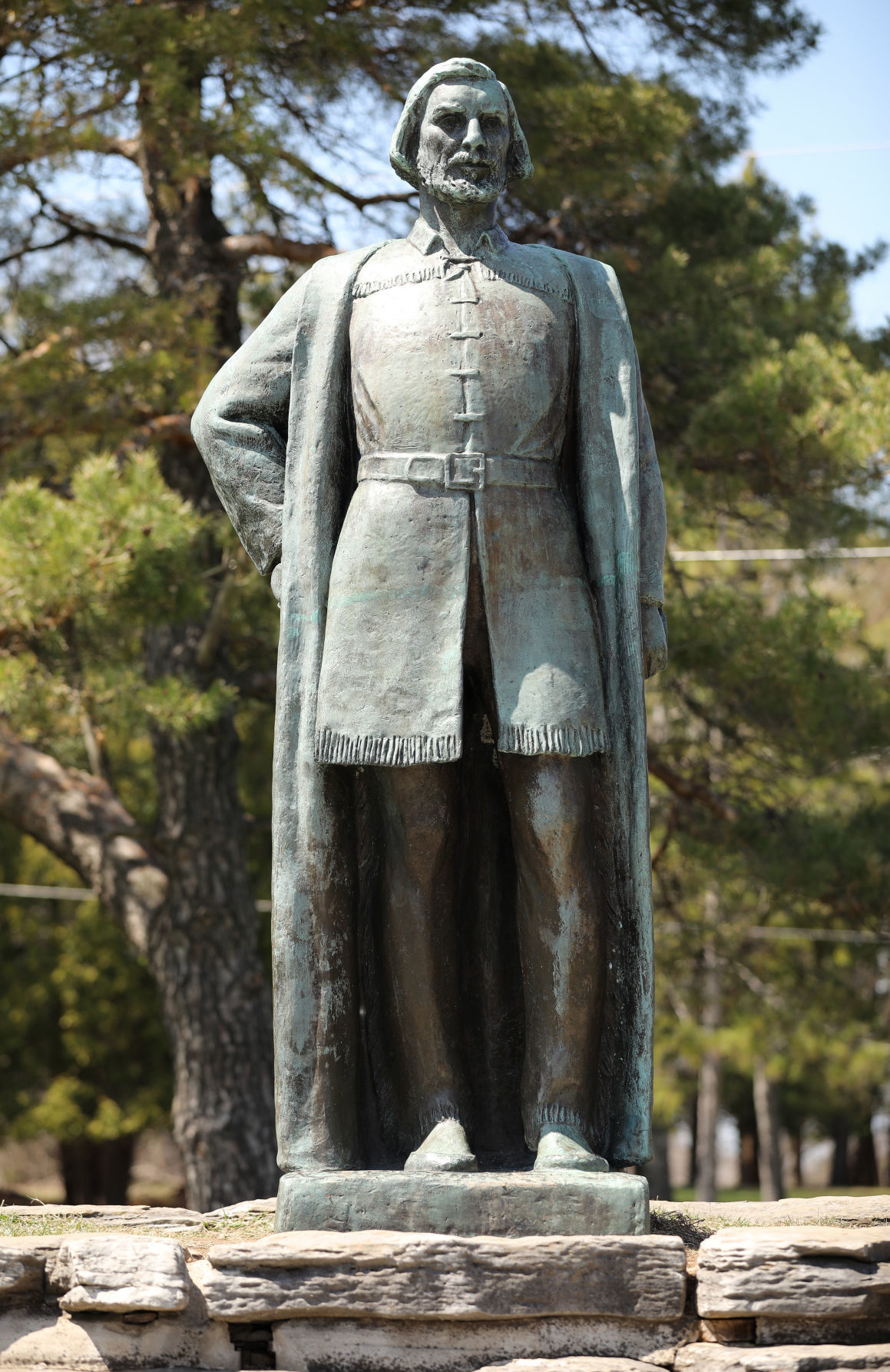
A 1951 statue of Nicolet stands in Green Bay, Wisconsin.

In July 1634, Nicolet traveled west into the Great Lakes. He was sent, likely by Champlain, to make peace in the conflict between French-allied native tribes and the Ho-Chunk. Nicolet landed on the shore of Green Bay, likely in September, the first European to do so. Stepping off the boat, he donned a silk robe and fired two pistols which he held in each hand; Barthélemy Vimont writes "the women and children fled at the sight of a man who carried thunder in both hands". Traditionally, it has been said that Nicolet's landing took place at Red Banks, a Ho-Chunk village. However, historian Patrick J. Jung points out that the Ho-Chunk village likely did not exist in 1634 and argues that Nicolet's diplomatic mission makes him more likely to have landed at Menekaunee, the main settlement of the neutral Menominee, near present-day Marinette, Wisconsin.

Nicolet's journals do not survive, and the only contemporary sources describing his 1634 voyage are brief summaries written by Paul Le Jeune and Vimont several years later. With few primary sources, many speculative stories and myths about Nicolet's journey have been repeated for centuries without evidence. For instance, it is often claimed that Nicolet's purpose was to find the mythical Northwest Passage to the Pacific Ocean, rather than to conduct diplomacy. According to these stories, his silk robe was supposedly of Chinese import, and he wore it because he expected to reach China at the western end of Green Bay. Part of this theory relies on the name given to the Ho-Chunk by the Potawatomi, Winnebago, meaning "bad-smelling water". Le Jeune writes that natives used this term to refer to both oceanic saltwater and foul smells in freshwater lakes. However, there is no contemporary evidence for the claim that Nicolet believed the "bad-smelling water" could be the gateway to the Pacific.

Others claim that Nicolet continued traveling up the Fox River, possibly reaching Portage and entering the Mississippi River watershed. Le Jeune writes that Nicolet had knowledge of the Illinois Confederation, suggesting that he could have traveled south through what is now Wisconsin into Illinois. However, Vimont writes that Nicolet immediately returned to Huronia after the peace conference was finished, and Nicolet could have gathered knowledge of the Illinois from the natives he met at Green Bay rather than by traveling there himself. Nicolet certainly had returned to Trois-Rivières by December 1635, according to Le Jeune, but may have arrived earlier than that.

== Death ==
On 29 October 1642, Nicolet drowned after his boat capsized just off Quebec City in Saint Lawrence River. He was either 43 or 44 years old. His body was never found.

== Legacy ==
External videos
- "Jean Nicollet " – Historica Canada. - Heritage Minutes (1:01 min)

- Nicolet, Quebec, along with its high school L'École Secondaire Jean-Nicolet
- Nicolet Area Technical College in Rhinelander, Wisconsin
- Nicolet High School in suburban Milwaukee
- In 1950, a statue of him was erected and is now located at Wequiock Falls County Park, about 10 miles northeast of Green Bay and a mile from where it is believed he landed.
- Nicolet's landing at Red Banks is commemorated by a 1910 mural at the Neville Public Museum in Green Bay, Wisconsin.
- In 1906, the Jean Nicolet Chapter of the Daughters of the American Revolution was organized.
- Nicolet National Bank
- Nicolet National Forest
- Nicolet Beach in Peninsula State Park, Wisconsin
- Nicollet Avenue in Winnipeg, Manitoba
- Liberty ship SS Jean Nicolet, launched in October 1943.
- Nicolet paper mill in De Pere, Wisconsin
- Nicolet Boulevard on Doty Island, Wisconsin, dividing the cities of Menasha and Neenah
- Nicolet Elementary School (closed 2022) on Doty Island in Menasha, Wisconsin
