= Wequiock, Wisconsin =

- Unincorporated community
- Location within Wisconsin Location within the United States
- Coordinates: 44°34′03″N 87°52′52″W
- Country: United States
- State: Wisconsin
- County: Brown
- Town: Scott
- Elevation: 725 ft (221 m)
- Time zone: UTC-6 (Central (CST))
  - Summer (DST): UTC-5 (CDT)
- Area code: 920
- GNIS feature ID: 1576431

Wequiock is an unincorporated community located in the town of Scott, Brown County, Wisconsin, United States.

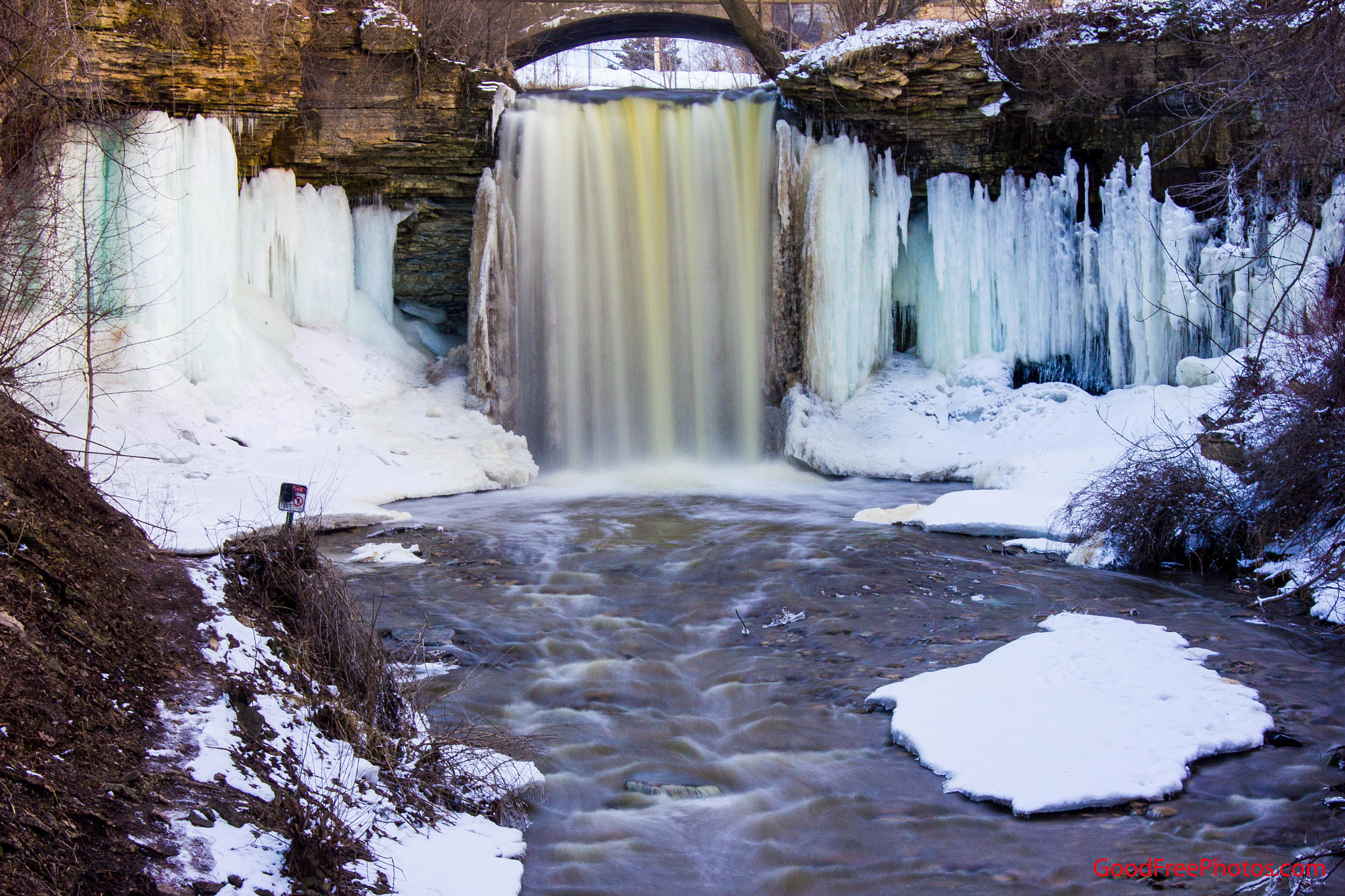
Wequiock Falls, in a county park of the same name along Highway 57
