= Scott, Brown County, Wisconsin =

Scott, Wisconsin
- Town
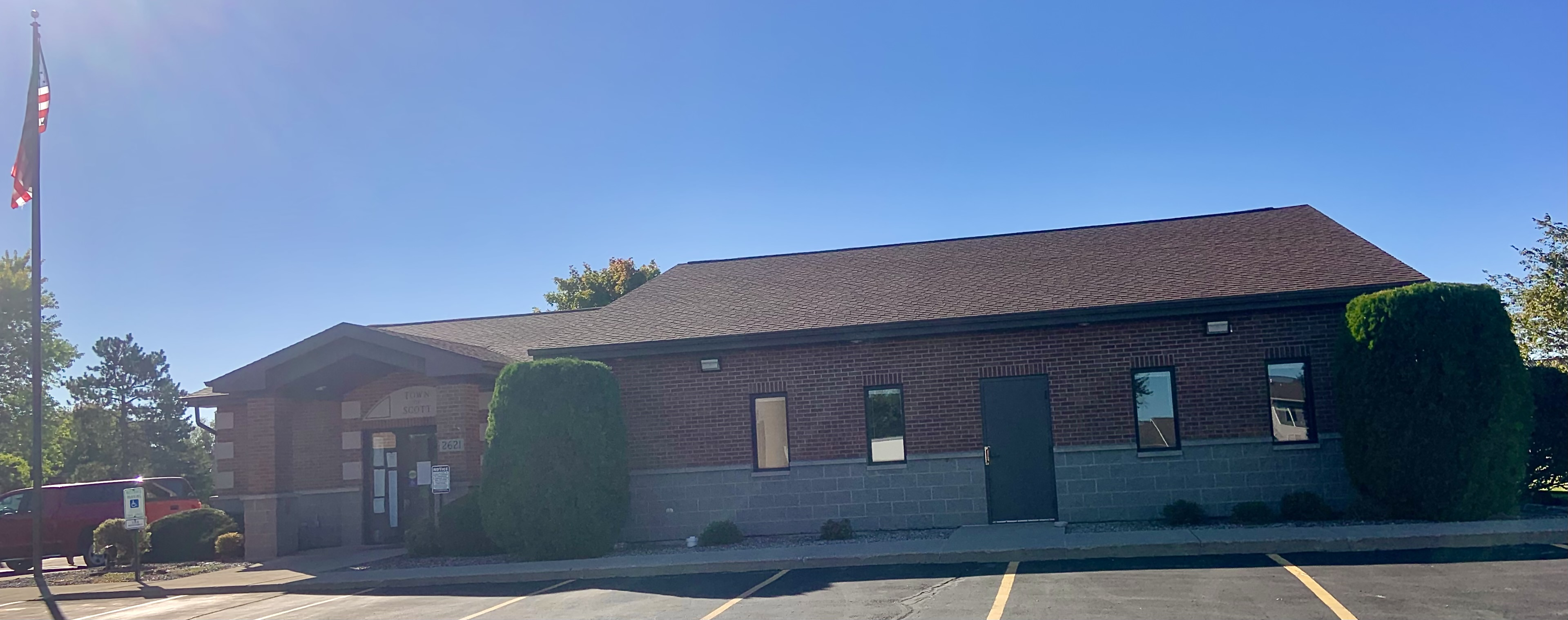
- Town hall

- Location in Brown County and the state of Wisconsin.
- Coordinates: 44°34′55″N 87°52′27″W
- Country: United States
- State: Wisconsin
- County: Brown

Area
  - Total: 52.7 sq mi (136.5 km^{2})
  - Land: 18.1 sq mi (47.0 km^{2})
  - Water: 34.6 sq mi (89.5 km^{2})
- Elevation: 643 ft (196 m)

Population (2020)
  - Total: 3,636
  - Density: 195/sq mi (75.4/km^{2})
- Time zone: UTC-6 (Central (CST))
  - Summer (DST): UTC-5 (CDT)
- Area code: 920
- FIPS code: 55-72200
- GNIS feature ID: 1584113
- Website: www.townofscott.com

Scott is a town in Brown County in the U.S. state of Wisconsin. As of the 2020 census, the population was 3,636.

== History ==
November 1859 the Brown County Board of Supervisors voted to divide the Town of Green Bay into smaller townships, one of which was to become the present Town of Scott. Three names were proposed: Liberty, Pochequette, and Scott. This last name was a favorite of Robert Gibson (first town chairman), probably because it evoked memories of his homeland. Presumably it was in honor of Sir Walter Scott.

== Communities ==
- Bay Settlement is an unincorporated community located at the intersection of Bay Settlement Road and Church Road. The immediate area is one of Wisconsin's oldest settlements with only nearby Green Bay and De Pere in addition to Prairie Du Chien in the southwest part of the state being older than the community.
- Benderville is an unincorporated community located at the intersection of County Road A and Point Comfort Road.
- Chapel Ridge is an unincorporated community split between the city of Green Bay and the town of Scott along Bay Settlement Road. University of Wisconsin-Green Bay is located just to the west.
- Edgewater Beach is an unincorporated community along the shores of Green Bay in between Benderville and Dyckesville.
- New Franken is an unincorporated community located partially within the town of Scott along County Road T north of WIS 54. The portion south of the state highway is in the town of Humboldt.
- Red Banks is an unincorporated community located to the west of Benderville. In 1634, Jean Nicolet landed at Red Banks becoming the first European to explore the present state of Wisconsin.
- Wequiock is an unincorporated community located just west of WIS 57 at the intersection of Bay Settlement Road and VanLaanen Road. Wequiock County Park is northeast of the community.

== Geography ==
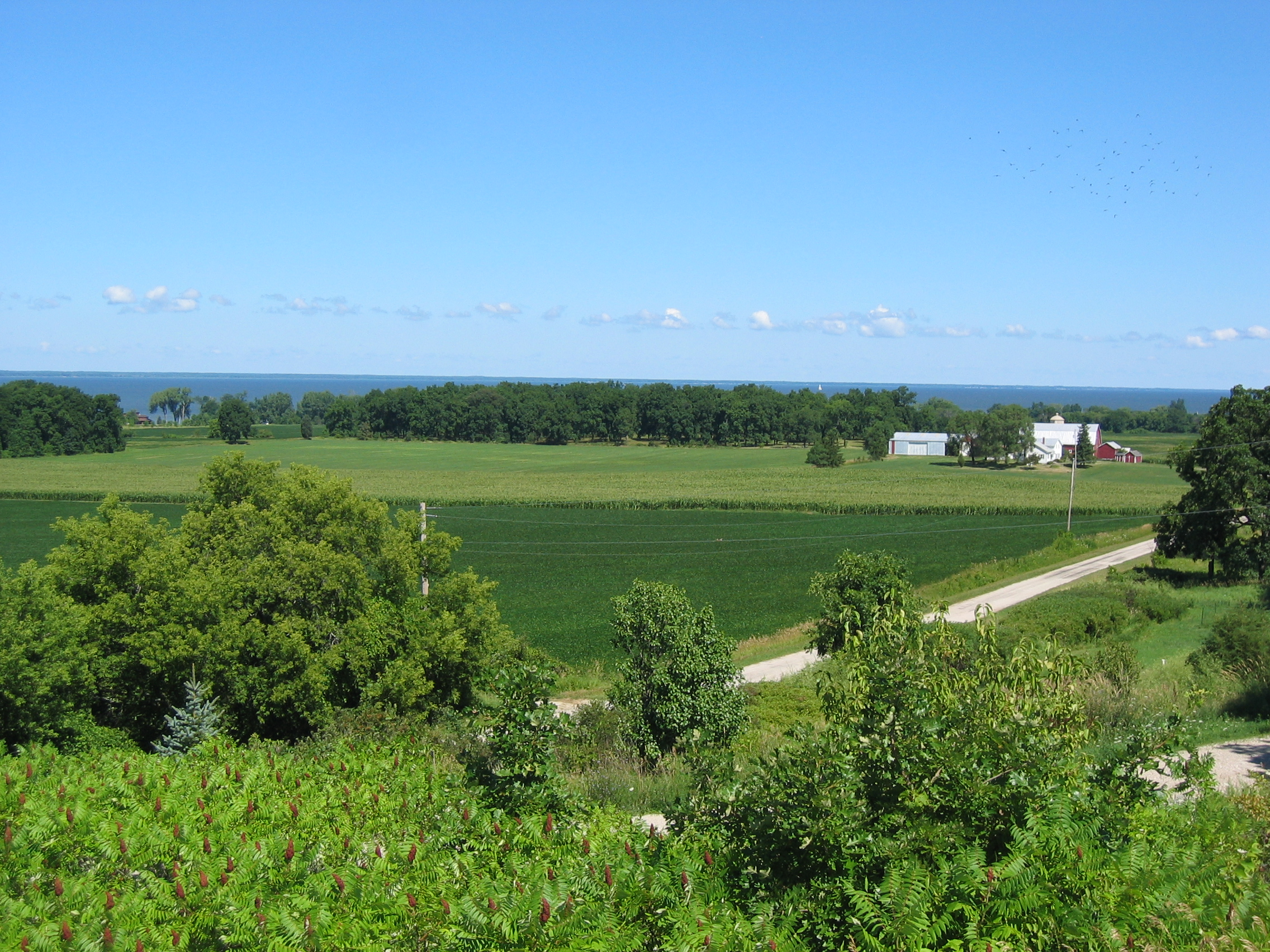
Wequiock Road (foreground) and Van Lieshout Road (background) in the town of Scott

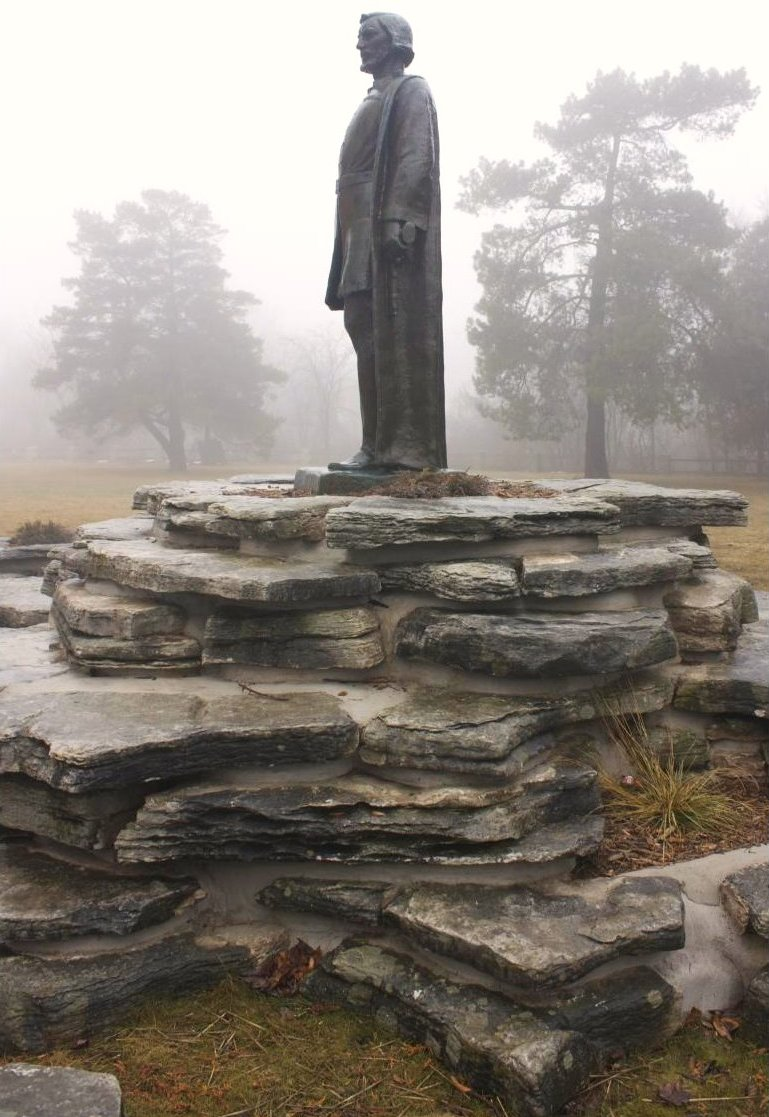
Jean Nicolet statue near State Highway 57 in southeastern Scott.

Scott is located in northeastern Brown County along the southeastern shore of Green Bay, an arm of Lake Michigan. The city of Green Bay borders the town to the west and south. The town of Green Bay, a separate municipality, borders Scott to the east, and the town of Humboldt lies to the south.

According to the United States Census Bureau, Scott has a total area of 52.7 square miles (136.5 km^{2}), of which 18.1 square miles (47.0 km^{2}) is land and 34.6 square miles (89.5 km^{2}), or 65.58%, is water.

The Hazen archeological site consists of remains left from a 19th-century farmstead located in the town.

== Demographics ==
Historical population
Census	Pop.	Note	%±
2000	3,712		—
2010	3,545		−4.5%
2020	3,636		2.6%
U.S. Decennial Census

As of the census of 2000, there were 3,712 people, 1,145 households, and 906 families residing in the town. The population density was 188.5 people per square mile (72.8/km^{2}). There were 1,234 housing units at an average density of 62.7 per square mile (24.2/km^{2}). The racial makeup of the town was 96.12% White, 1.62% African American, 0.35% Native American, 0.65% Asian, 0.57% from other races, and 0.70% from two or more races. Hispanic or Latino of any race were 1.48% of the population.

There were 1,145 households, out of which 37.9% had children under the age of 18 living with them, 71.9% were married couples living together, 4.0% had a female householder with no husband present, and 20.8% were non-families. 14.7% of all households were made up of individuals, and 4.3% had someone living alone who was 65 years of age or older. The average household size was 2.73 and the average family size was 3.04.

In the town, the population was spread out, with 23.0% under the age of 18, 16.8% from 18 to 24, 30.7% from 25 to 44, 22.1% from 45 to 64, and 7.5% who were 65 years of age or older. The median age was 33 years. For every 100 females, there were 95.6 males. For every 100 females age 18 and over, there were 98.3 males.

The median income for a household in the town was $58,051, and the median income for a family was $62,138. Males had a median income of $41,996 versus $26,167 for females. The per capita income for the town was $21,992. About 0.6% of families and 2.0% of the population were below the poverty line, including 0.6% of those under age 18 and 0.6% of those age 65 or over.
