= Benderville, Wisconsin =

- Unincorporated community
- Location within Wisconsin Location within the United States
- Coordinates: 44°36′41″N 87°51′18″W
- Country: United States
- State: Wisconsin
- County: Brown
- Town: Scott
- Elevation: 610 ft (190 m)
- Time zone: UTC-6 (Central (CST))
  - Summer (DST): UTC-5 (CDT)
- Area code: 920
- GNIS feature ID: 1561556

Benderville is an unincorporated community located in the town of Scott, Brown County, Wisconsin, United States. Benderville is located on County Highway A near the southeastern shore of Green Bay, 10.5 miles (16.9 km) northeast of the city of Green Bay.
