= Ruhl Maulsby =

American politician (1923–1996)

Member of the Iowa House of Representatives from the 9th district
- In office January 10, 1983 – January 10, 1993
- Preceded by: Del Stromer
- Succeeded by: Thomas H. Miller

Member of the Iowa House of Representatives from the 47th district
- In office January 8, 1979 – January 9, 1983
- Preceded by: Opal Miller
- Succeeded by: Myron B. Oxley

Personal details
- Born: October 18, 1923 Rockwell City, Iowa
- Died: February 24, 1996 (aged 72)
- Party: Republican

Ruhl Maulsby (October 18, 1923 – February 24, 1996) was an American politician who served in the Iowa House of Representatives from 1979 to 1993.
