= Carter Nordman =

American politician (born 1998)

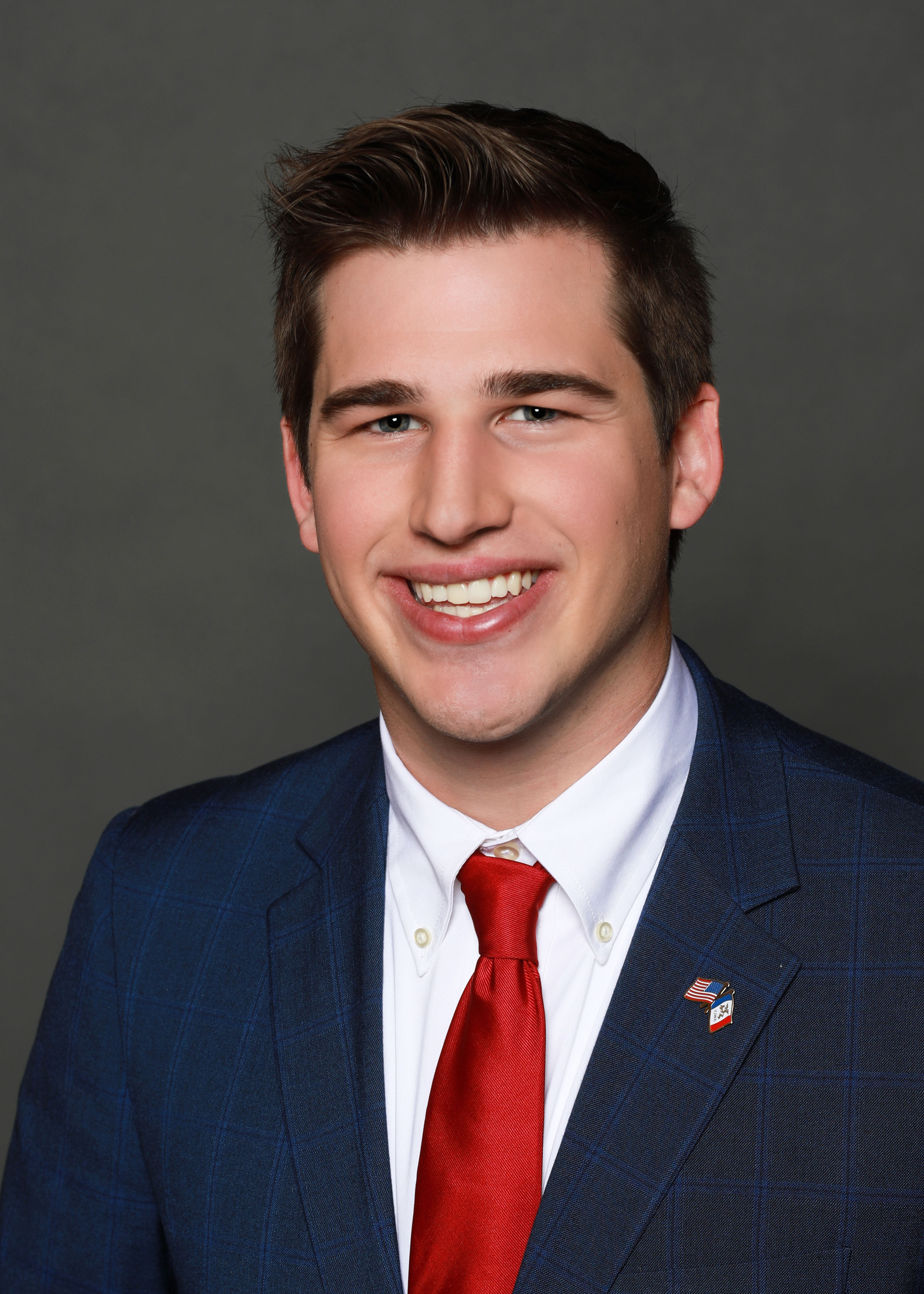
- Nordman in 2021

Member of the Iowa House of Representatives from the 47th district
- Incumbent
- Assumed office January 11, 2021
- Preceded by: Chris Hagenow

Personal details
- Born: May 27, 1998 (age 28)
- Party: Republican
- Education: University of Northern Iowa (BBA)

Carter F. Nordman (born May 27, 1998) is an American politician serving as a member of the Iowa House of Representatives from the 47th district. Elected in November 2020, he assumed office on January 11, 2021. Nordman is the youngest state legislator in Iowa and one of the youngest in the United States.

== Early life and education ==
A native of Adel, Iowa, Nordman graduated from Adel DeSoto Minburn High School. Nordman earned a Bachelor of Business Administration from the University of Northern Iowa.

== Career ==
Shortly after his high school graduation, Nordman ran for mayor of Adel against incumbent Jim Peters, losing narrowly in a closely contested election. From 2017 to 2019, Nordman served as a Legislative Assistant for members of the Iowa House of Representatives. He also previously served as Chair of the Adel Parks and Recreation Board.

=== Iowa House of Representatives ===
Nordman was elected to the Iowa House of Representatives in November 2020 and assumed office on January 11, 2021. Nordman serves as chairman of the House Ways and Means Committee. He is also a member of the Administration & Rules, Commerce, and Judiciary Committees. Nordman is also a member of the Human Rights Board.

Iowa House of Representatives
Preceded by Phil Thompson	47th District; 2023 – present	Succeeded by Incumbent
Preceded by Chris Hagenow	19th District; 2021 – 2023	Succeeded by Brent Siegrist
