= Joe Riding =

American politician

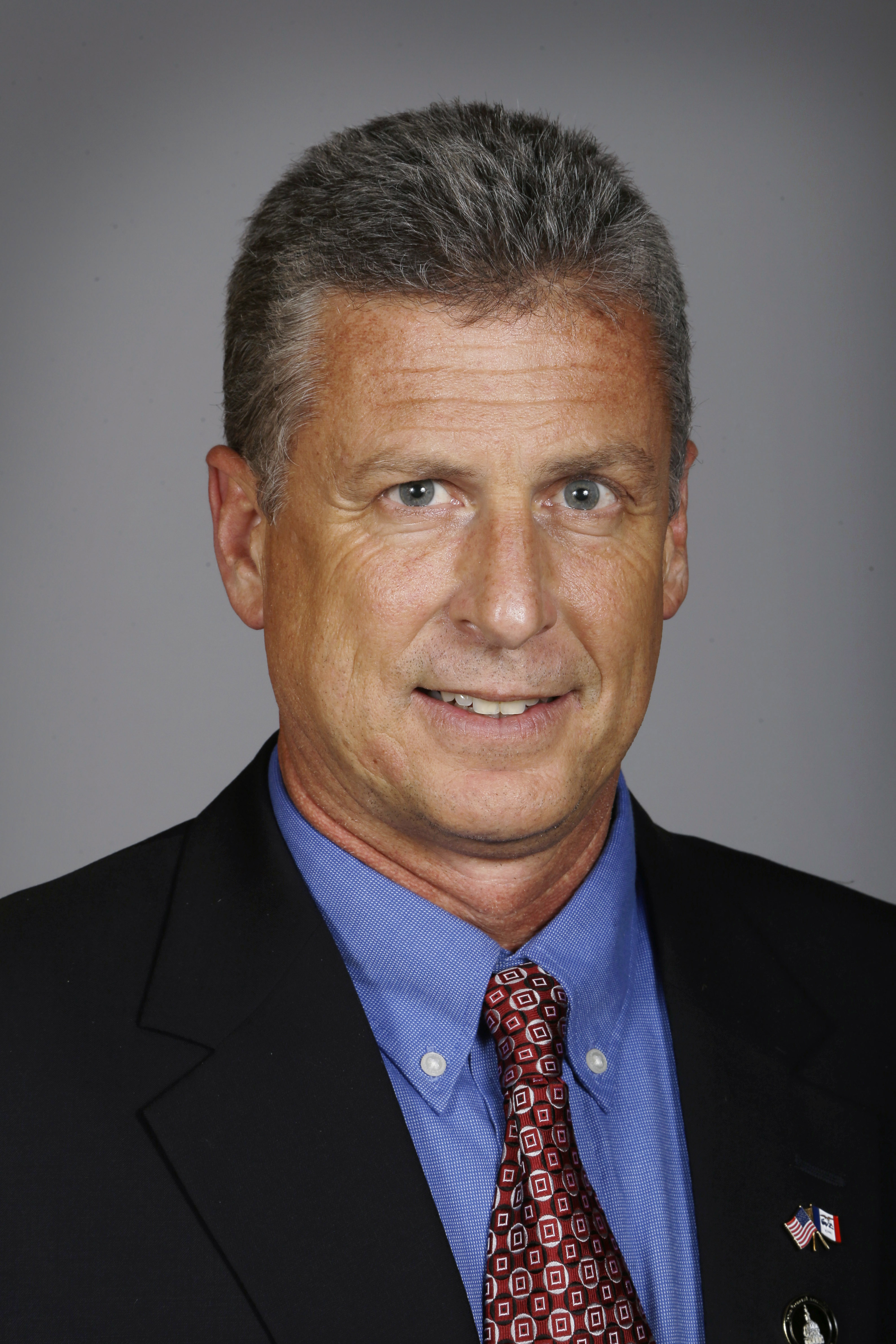

Member of the Iowa House of Representatives from the 30th district
- In office January 14, 2013 – January 11, 2015
- Preceded by: David Jacoby
- Succeeded by: Zach Nunn

Personal details
- Born: August 8, 1962 (age 64) St. Paul, Minnesota, U.S.
- Party: Democratic
- Spouse: Leann
- Children: 2 children
- Education: Upper Iowa University
- Website: Riding's website

Joe Riding (born August 8, 1962) is an American politician. A Democrat, he served in the Iowa House of Representatives from 2013 to 2015.

== Early life and political career ==
Riding was born in St. Paul, Minnesota on August 8, 1962. He was raised in Altoona, Iowa, and graduated from Southeast Polk High School before earning a degree from Upper Iowa University. Riding and his wife Leann own the Terrace Hills Golf Course. He won the Iowa House of Representatives, District 30 seat in 2012, facing Republican candidate Jim Carley. Riding lost to Zach Nunn in a 2014 bid for a second term, and lost again to Nunn in 2016.

As a member of the Iowa House, Riding served on several committees, among them the Commerce, Local Government, Transportation, and Ways and Means committees. He also served as a member of the Administration and Regulation Appropriations Subcommittee.

== Electoral history ==
*incumbent

Election	Political result	Candidate	Party	Votes	%
Iowa House of Representatives primary elections, 2012; District 30	Democratic	Joe Riding	Democratic	unopposed	
Iowa House of Representatives general elections, 2012; District 30; Turnout: 17,575	Democratic (newly redistricted)	Joe Riding	Democratic	8,764	49.87%
Iowa House of Representatives general elections, 2012; District 30; Turnout: 17,575	Democratic (newly redistricted)	Jim Carley	Republican	8,044	45.77%

Iowa House of Representatives
Preceded by David Jacoby	30th District; 2013 – 2015	Succeeded by Zach Nunn
