= Red Banks, Brown County, Wisconsin =

Red Banks, Wisconsin
- Unincorporated community
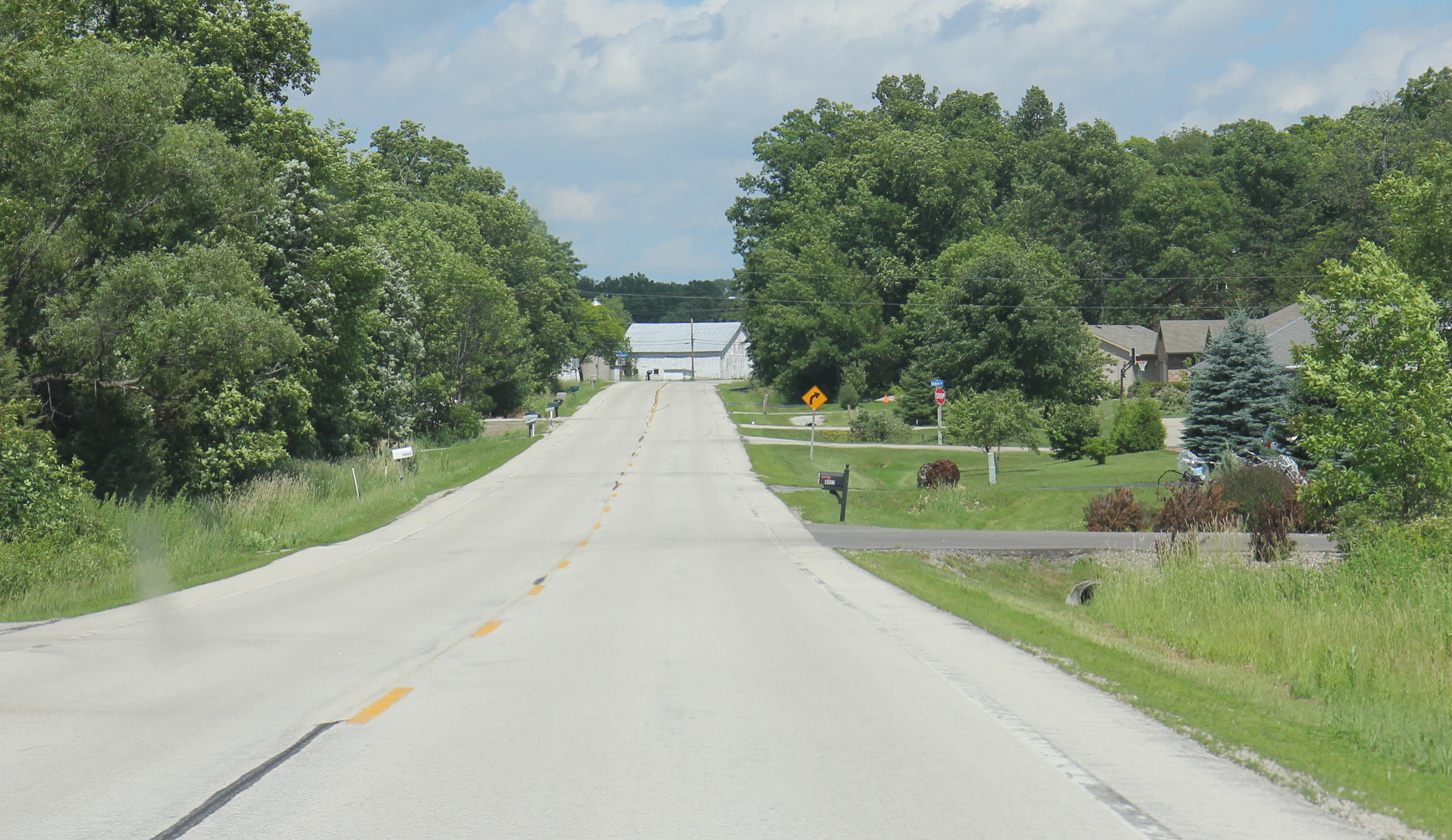
- Looking east in Red Banks

- Location within Wisconsin Location within the United States
- Coordinates: 44°36′40″N 87°51′47″W
- Country: United States
- State: Wisconsin
- County: Brown
- Town: Scott
- Elevation: 630 ft (190 m)
- Time zone: UTC-6 (Central (CST))
  - Summer (DST): UTC-5 (CDT)
- Area code: 920
- GNIS feature ID: 1572129

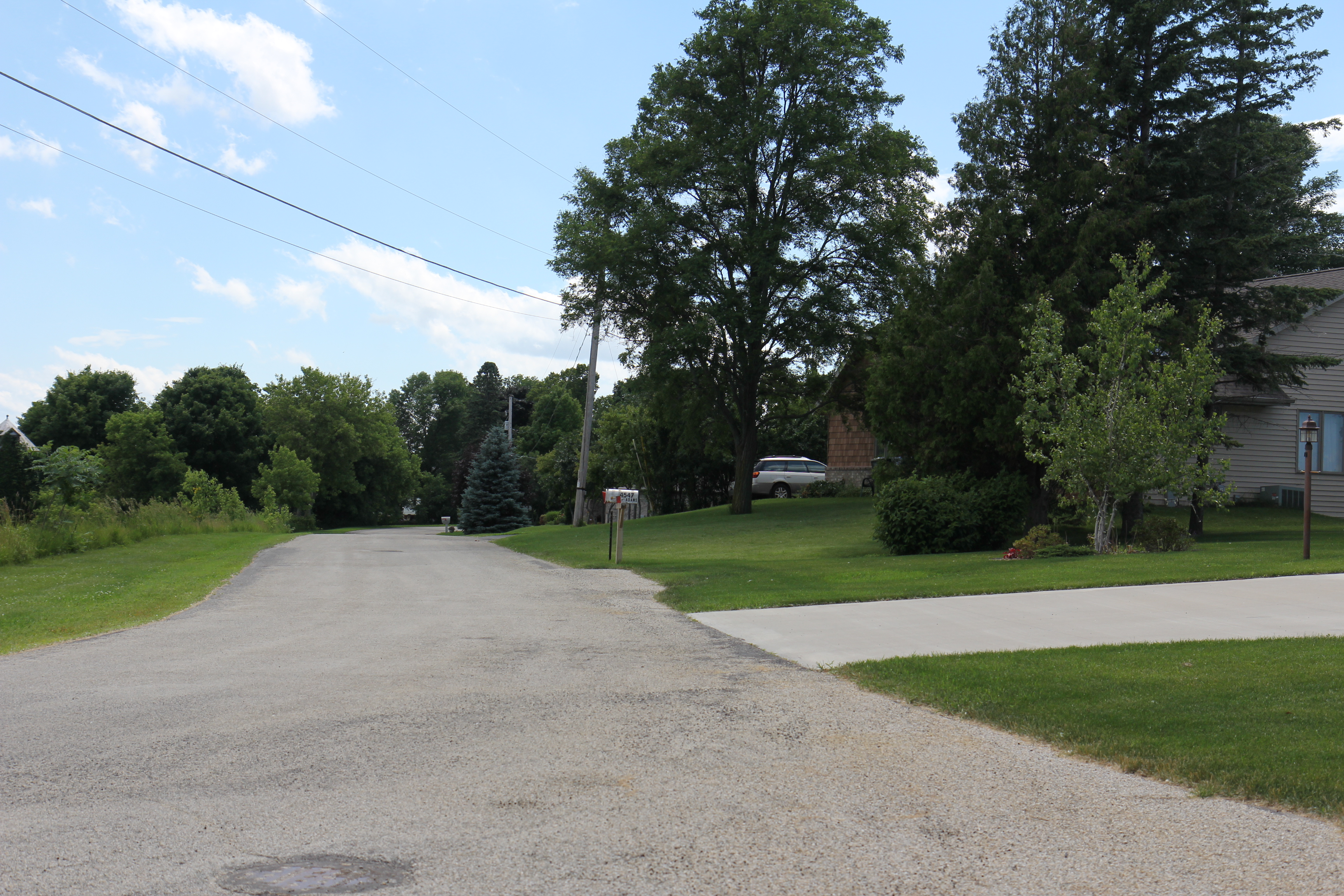
Looking south in Red Banks

Red Banks is an unincorporated community located in the town of Scott, Brown County, Wisconsin, United States.

== History ==
The area in which Red Banks is now located was historically inhabited by several Indigenous peoples. The Menominee and the Potawatomi are both recorded as having been present in the area in the past. In Potawatomi, Red Banks is called "mskwedbénang".

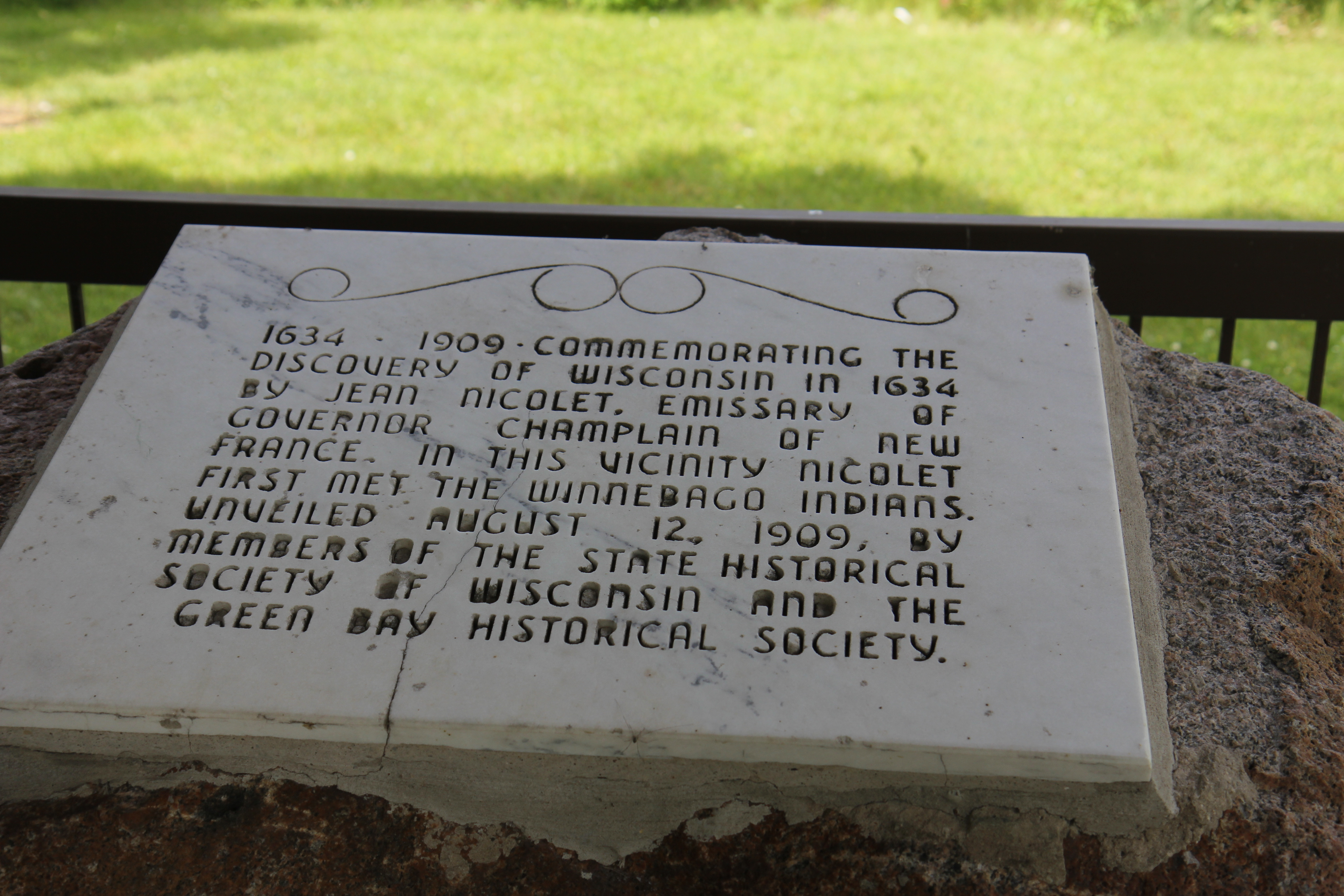
Nicolet plaque near Red Bank

In 1634, Jean Nicolet landed at Red Banks becoming the first European to explore the present state of Wisconsin.
