= Chad Behn =

American politician

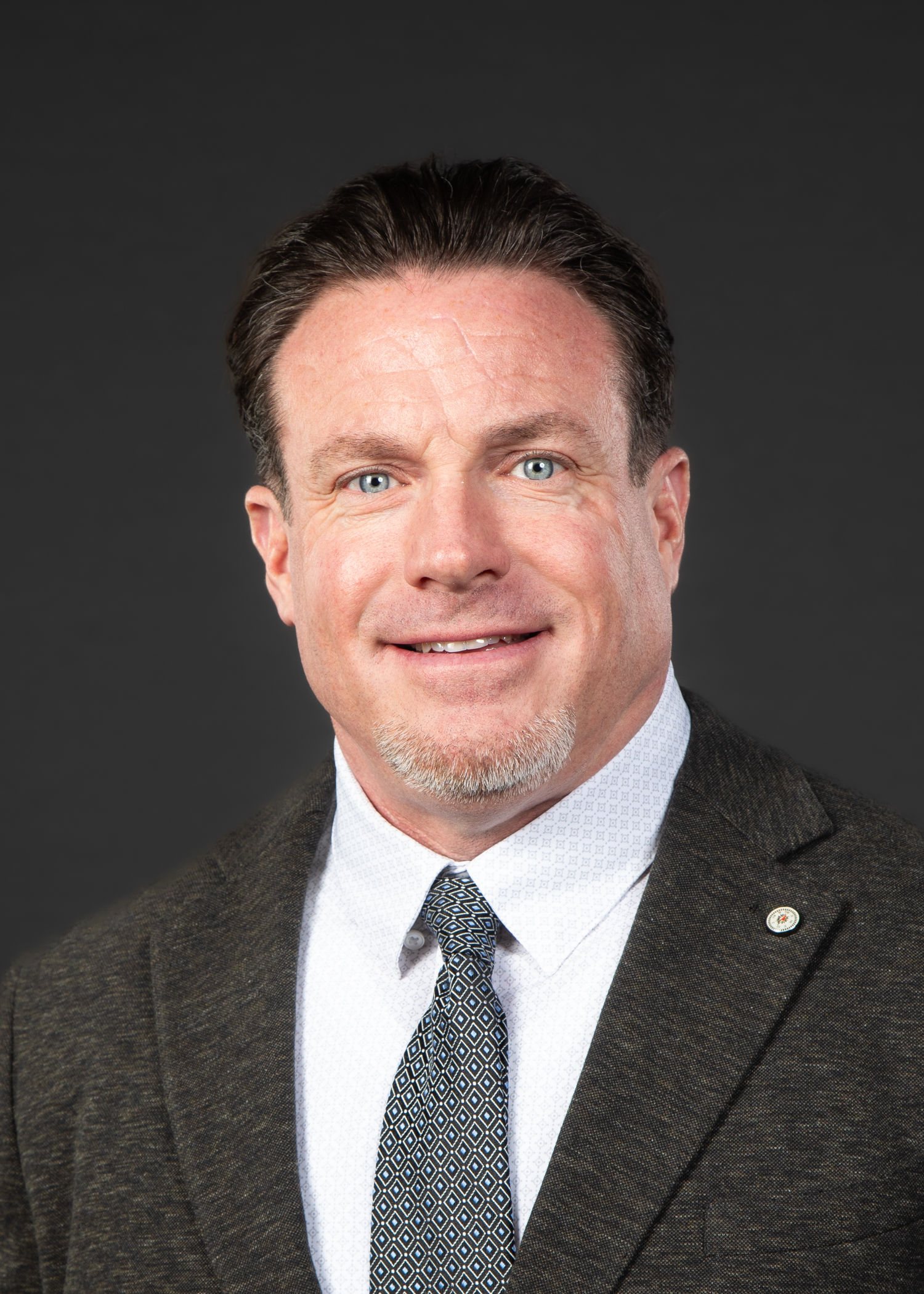

Member of the Iowa House of Representatives from the 48th district
- Incumbent
- Assumed office January 13, 2025
- Preceded by: Phil Thompson

Personal details
- Born: Boone County, Iowa
- Party: Republican
- Parent: Jerry Behn (father)

Chad Behn is an American politician. He serves as a Republican member for the 48th district in the Iowa House of Representatives since 2025.

Behn was born and raised in rural Boone County, Iowa. He is the son of Senator Jerry Behn.

== Political Career ==
Behn first ran as Republican nominee for the Iowa Senate in 2020, losing the primary to Jesse Green. In 2024 he ran again, this time for Iowa House District 48, comprising Boone County and portions of western Story County, and eventually won and defeated Democrat Penny Vossler in the general election.

=== 91st Iowa General Assembly Committee assignments ===
Behn serves on the following committees in the Iowa House:

- Agriculture (vice chair)
- Education
- Transportation
- Ways and Means
