= Linda Upmeyer =

American politician

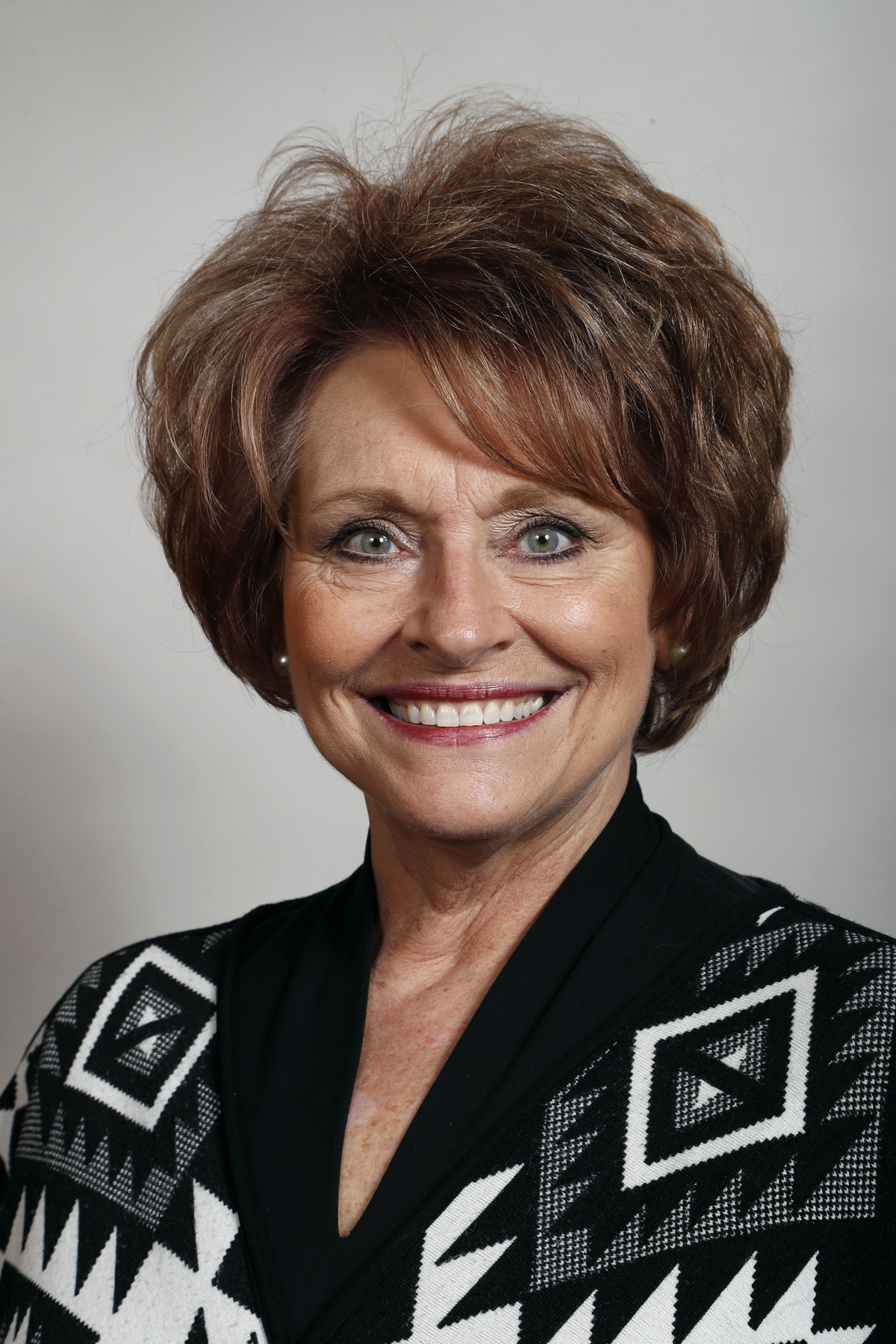

Speaker of the Iowa House of Representatives
- In office January 14, 2016 – January 13, 2020
- Preceded by: Kraig Paulsen
- Succeeded by: Pat Grassley

Member of the Iowa House of Representatives from the 54th district 14th (2003–2016)
- In office January 13, 2003 – January 11, 2021
- Preceded by: Clarence Hoffman
- Succeeded by: Shannon Latham

Personal details
- Born: July 23, 1952 (age 74) Mason City, Iowa, U.S.
- Party: Republican
- Spouse: Doug Upmeyer
- Children: 5
- Education: North Iowa Area Community College; University of Iowa (BS); Drake University (MS)

Linda L. Upmeyer (born July 23, 1952) is an American politician who served in the Iowa House of Representatives from the 54th district from 2003 to 2021 and as the Speaker of the Iowa House of Representatives from 2016 to 2020. She was the first female Speaker in Iowa's history. She received her BSN from the University of Iowa and her MSN from Drake University. On August 19, 2015, Upmeyer was elected by the members of the Iowa House of Representatives Republican majority to serve as the Speaker of the House. Upmeyer's father, Del Stromer, served as Speaker from 1981–82.

Upmeyer formerly served on the Administration and Rules committee in the Iowa House. She was also a member of the Legislative Council.

== Biography ==
Upmeyer was born in Mason City, Iowa, to Del Stromer and Harriett Ostendorf. She grew up in Garner on the family farm. First elected in 2002, Upmeyer serves as the Majority Leader of the Iowa House of Representatives. She is a cardiology nurse practitioner. She is the National Chair of the American Legislative Exchange Council (ALEC), an organization funded by the Koch brothers and focused on limited government, free markets, and federalism.

== Electoral history ==
Election	Political result	Candidate	Party	Votes	%
Iowa House of Representatives primary elections, 2002; District 12; Turnout: 4,112	Republican (newly redistricted)	Linda Upmeyer	Republican	2,799	68
Iowa House of Representatives primary elections, 2002; District 12; Turnout: 4,112	Republican (newly redistricted)	Kirk Kraft	Republican	1,309	32
Iowa House of Representatives elections, 2002; District 12; Turnout: 10,820	Republican (newly redistricted)	Linda Upmeyer	Republican	6,617	61
Iowa House of Representatives elections, 2002; District 12; Turnout: 10,820	Republican (newly redistricted)	Jim Braun	Democratic	4,197	39
Iowa House of Representatives elections, 2004; District 12; Turnout: 15,033	Republican hold	Linda Upmeyer*	Republican	10,436	
Iowa House of Representatives elections, 2004; District 12; Turnout: 15,033	Republican hold	Vernon Harper	Democratic	4,585	31
Iowa House of Representatives elections, 2006; District 12	Republican hold	Linda Upmeyer*	Republican	unopposed	
Iowa House of Representatives elections, 2008; District 12; Turnout: 14,474	Republican hold	Linda Upmeyer*	Republican	10,086	70
Iowa House of Representatives elections, 2008; District 12; Turnout: 14,474	Republican hold	Randall Rainer	Democratic	4,380	30
Iowa House of Representatives elections, 2010; District 12	Republican hold	Linda Upmeyer*	Republican	unopposed	
Iowa House of Representatives general elections, 2012; District 54	Republican (newly redistricted)	Linda Upmeyer*	Republican	unopposed	

* = incumbent

== See also ==
- List of female speakers of legislatures in the United States

Iowa House of Representatives
Preceded by Clarence Hoffman	Member of the Iowa House of Representatives from the 12th district 2003–2013	Succeeded by Dan Muhlbauer
Preceded by Ron Jorgensen	Member of the Iowa House of Representatives from the 54th district 2013–2021	Succeeded by Shannon Latham
Political offices
Preceded by Kraig Paulsen	Speaker of the Iowa House of Representatives; 2016–2020	Succeeded by Pat Grassley
