= MidWestOne Financial Group =

American financial and banking company

MidWestOne Financial Group, Inc.
- Company type: Public
- Traded as: Nasdaq: MOFG; Russell 2000 Component
- Industry: Banking
- Founded: 1983; 43 years ago
- Headquarters: Iowa City, Iowa, U.S.
- Key people: Charles N. Reeves (CEO); Barry S. Ray (CFO)
- Revenue: ▲$0.049 billion (2019)
- Net income: ▲$0.0436 billion (2019)
- Total assets: ▲$4.653 billion (2019)
- Total equity: ▲$0.508 billion (2019)
- Owner: Nicolet Bankshares
- Number of employees: 802
- Website: midwestone.bank

MidWestOne Financial Group, Inc. is a bank holding company headquartered in Iowa City, Iowa that operates 56 bank branches. The third-largest bank headquartered in Iowa, it operates in Iowa, Minnesota, Wisconsin, Colorado, and Florida.

== History ==
The subsidiary bank was founded as Iowa State Bank & Trust Company in 1934 by Ben S. Summerwill. In 1983, ISB Financial Corp. was established as a privately held banking holding company for ISB&TC.

In March 2008, ISB Financial merged with MidWestOne Financial Group and took MidWestOne Financial Group, Inc. as the name of the company. In May 2015, four years after chairman W. Richard Summerwill retired, the bank acquired Minnesota-based Central Bancshares for $134 million in cash and stock.

Having opened its first branch in Denver, Colorado in 2017, it hired Barry S. Ray as its Chief Financial Officer in June of the following year and Charles N. Reeves as its CEO in November 2022.

On October 23, 2025, it was announced that MidWestOne would be acquired by Nicolet Bankshares in a $864 million all-stock deal. When it completed the merger of its operations with the Iowa firm in February 2026, Nicolet stated that the MidWestOne locations would subsequently adopt its brand.
