= Phil Thompson (Iowa politician) =

American politician

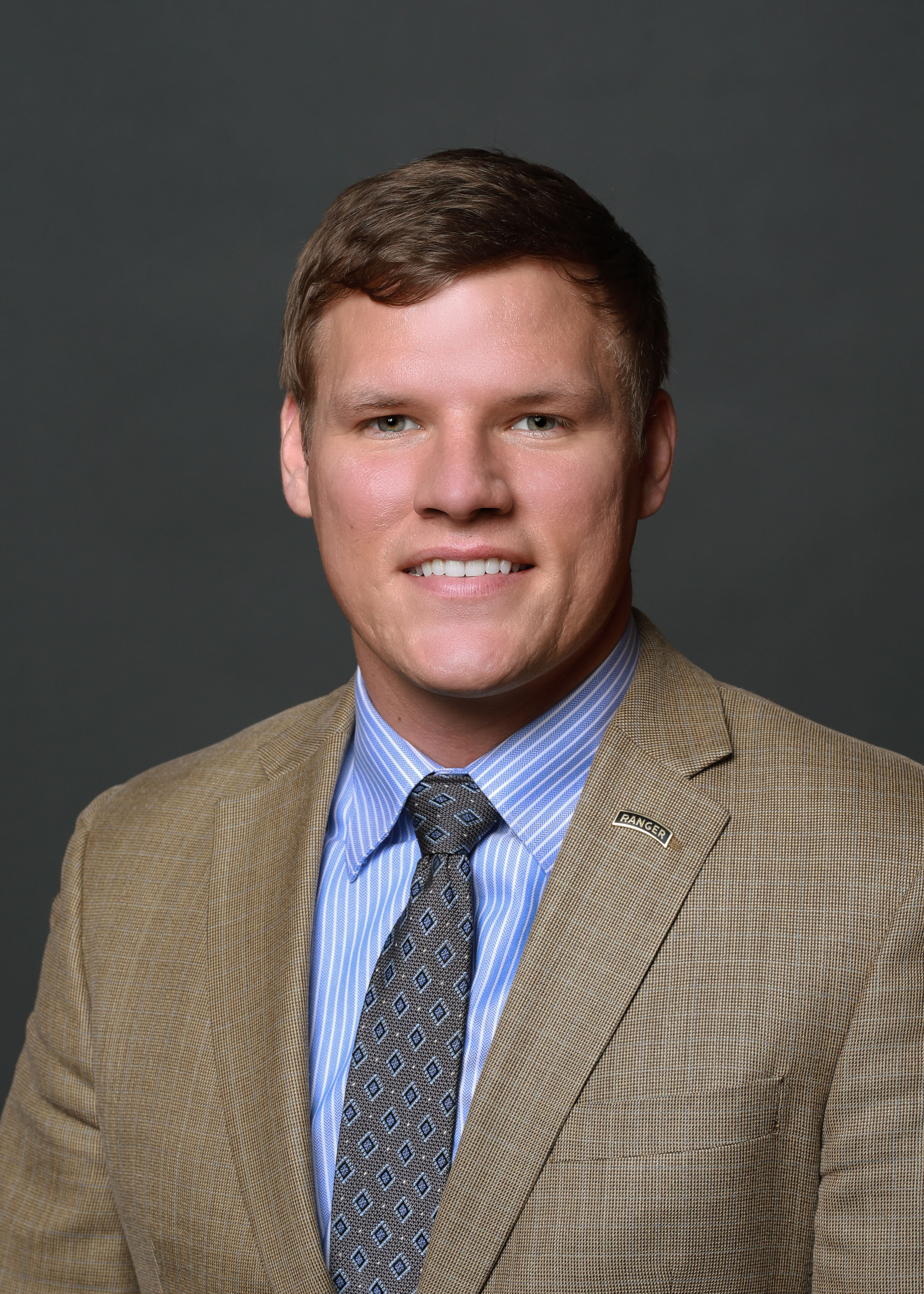

Member of the Iowa House of Representatives
- In office January 14, 2019 – January 12, 2025
- Preceded by: Chip Baltimore
- Succeeded by: Chad Behn
- Constituency: 47th district (2019–2023); 48th district (2023–2025)

Personal details
- Born: 1991 (age 34–35) Jefferson, Iowa, U.S.
- Party: Republican

Military service
- Branch/service: United States Army
- Unit: Iowa National Guard
- Battles/wars: Iraq War

Phil Thompson (born 1991) is an American politician who served as a member of the Iowa House of Representatives from the 48th. Elected in November 2018, he assumed office on January 14, 2019 and served until 2025.

== Early life and education ==
Thompson was born in Jefferson, Iowa in 1991. After graduating from Jefferson-Scranton High School, he enlisted in the U.S. Army. He also studied systems engineering at the United States Military Academy for two years.

== Career ==
Thompson served as an infantryman in the United States Army during the Iraq War. He later returned to Iowa and joined the Iowa National Guard. He worked as a field representative for the National Rifle Association Institute for Legislative Action and also served as an assistant for State Representative Dawn Pettengill. He was elected to the Iowa House of Representatives in November 2018 and assumed office on January 14, 2019.

Iowa House of Representatives
Preceded by Robert Bacon	48th District; 2023 – 2025	Succeeded by Incumbent
Preceded by Chip Baltimore	47th District; 2019 – 2023	Succeeded by Carter Nordman
