= Donovan Olson =

American politician (born 1965)

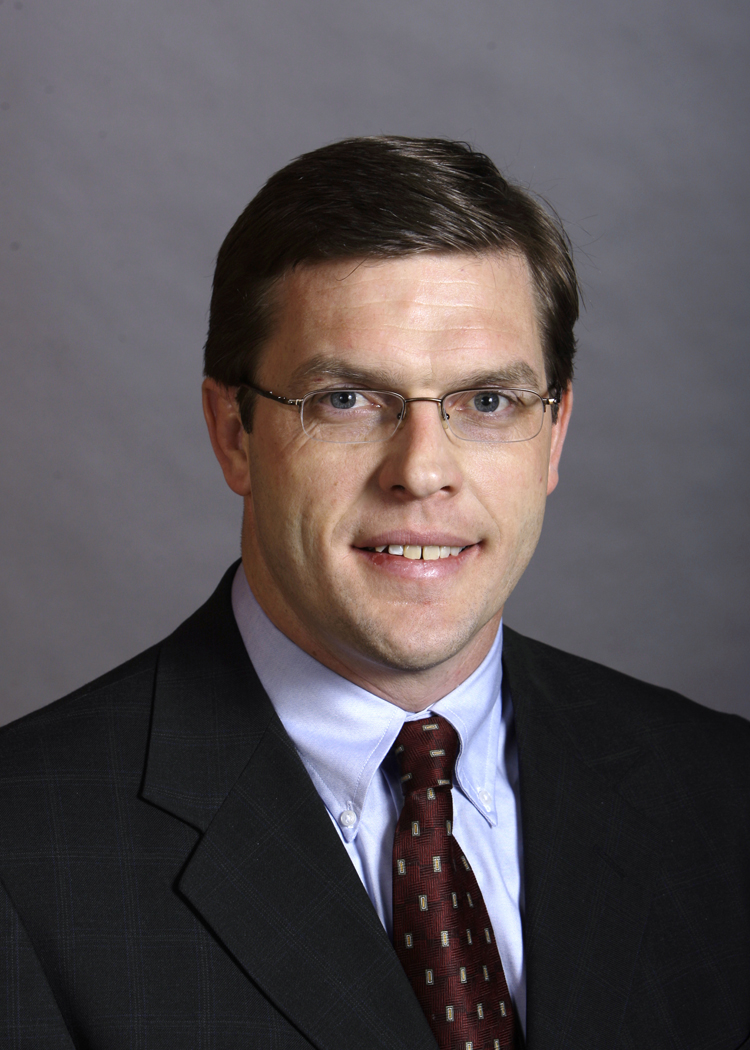

Member of the Iowa House of Representatives from the 48th district
- In office January 13, 2003 – January 9, 2011
- Preceded by: James Hahn
- Succeeded by: Chip Baltimore

Personal details
- Born: June 12, 1965 (age 61) Boone, Iowa
- Party: Democratic
- Spouse: Sue
- Education: Iowa State University
- Website: Olson's website

Donovan Olson (born June 12, 1965) is a former Iowa State Representative from the 48th District. A Democrat, he served in the Iowa House of Representatives from 2003 until 2011, when he lost re-election to Republican Chip Baltimore. He received his BA and MCRP from Iowa State University.

During his last term in the Iowa House, Olson served on the Commerce, Joint Government Oversight, Local Government, Transportationm, and Ways and Means committees. He also served as chair of the Environmental Protection Committee and as a member of the Agriculture and Natural Resources Appropriations Subcommittee and of the Climate Change Advisory Council.

== Electoral history ==
*incumbent

Election	Political result	Candidate	Party	Votes	%
Iowa House of Representatives primary elections, 2002; District 48; Turnout: 1,002	Democratic (newly redistricted)	Donovan Olson	Democratic	514	51.3
Iowa House of Representatives primary elections, 2002; District 48; Turnout: 1,002	Democratic (newly redistricted)	Mary Lee Weaver	Democratic	486	48.5
Iowa House of Representatives elections, 2002; District 48; Turnout: 10,164	Democratic (newly redistricted)	Donovan Olson	Democratic	5,177	50.9
Iowa House of Representatives elections, 2002; District 48; Turnout: 10,164	Democratic (newly redistricted)	Philip L. Stone	Republican	4,981	49.0
Iowa House of Representatives elections, 2004; District 48; Turnout: 13,977	Democratic hold	Donovan Olson*	Democratic	7,888	56.4
Iowa House of Representatives elections, 2004; District 48; Turnout: 13,977	Democratic hold	Charles Braun	Republican	6,086	43.5
Iowa House of Representatives elections, 2006; District 48; Turnout: 10,046	Democratic hold	Donovan Olson*	Democratic	6,145	61.2
Iowa House of Representatives elections, 2006; District 48; Turnout: 10,046	Democratic hold	Charles Braun	Republican	3,856	38.4
Iowa House of Representatives elections, 2008; District 48	Democratic hold	Donovan Olson*	Democratic	unopposed	
Iowa House of Representatives elections, 2010; District 48; Turnout: 10,988	Republican gain from Democratic	Chip Baltimore	Republican	5,384	49.0
Iowa House of Representatives elections, 2010; District 48; Turnout: 10,988	Republican gain from Democratic	Donovan Olson*	Democratic	5,361	48.9

Iowa House of Representatives
Preceded by James Hahn	48th District; 2003 – 2011	Succeeded by Chip Baltimore
