= Holy Cross Church and Convent =

Historic church in Wisconsin, United States

- U.S. National Register of Historic Places
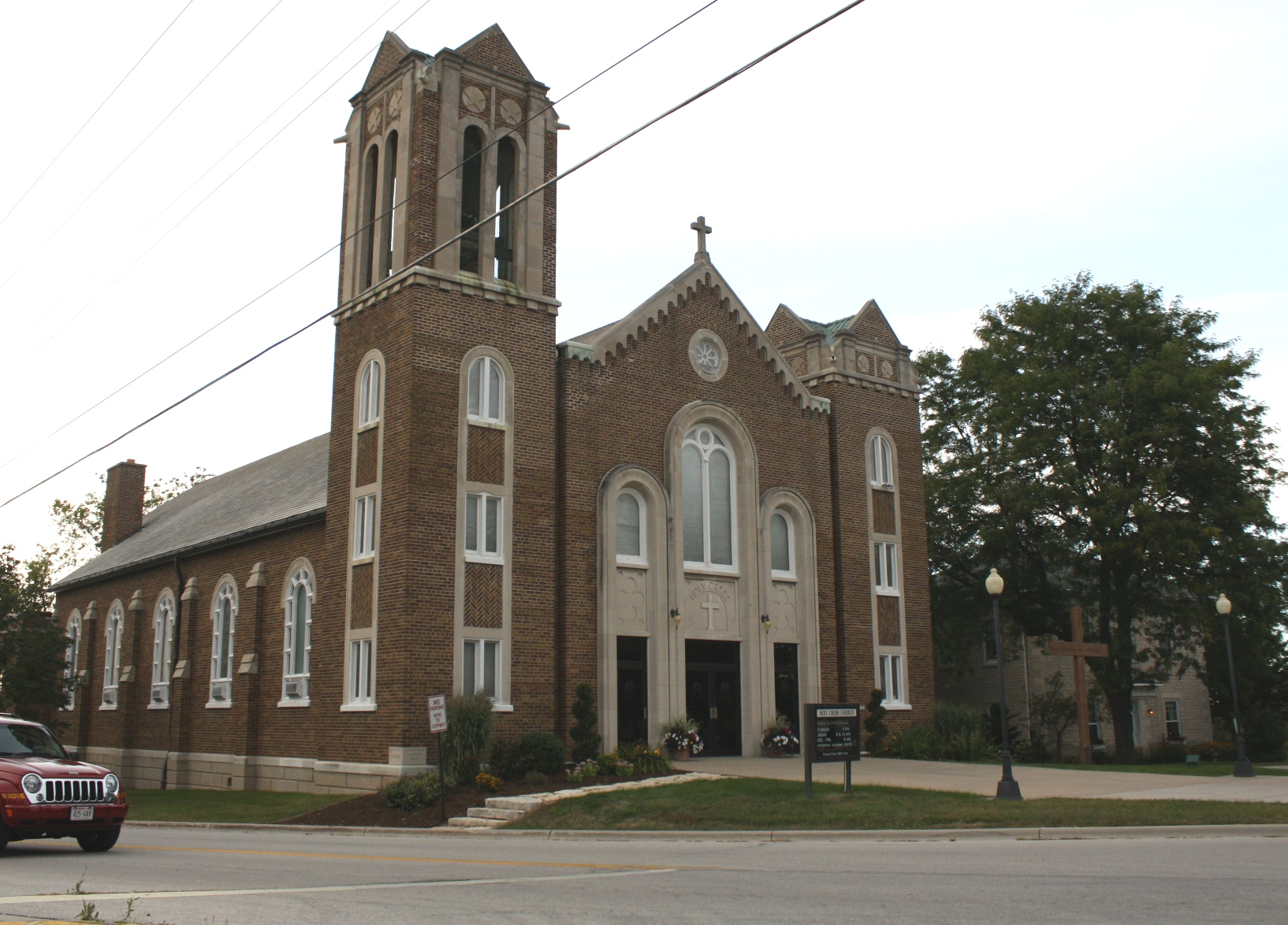

- Location within Wisconsin Location within the United States
- Location: 3001 Bay Settlement Rd., Green Bay, Wisconsin
- Coordinates: 44°33′20″N 87°53′27″W
- Area: 5.8 acres (2.3 ha)
- Built: 1862
- Architect: Foeller, Schober and Berners; Reynolds, William E.
- Architectural style: Romanesque, Italianate
- NRHP reference No.: 01000685
- Added to NRHP: June 28, 2001

Holy Cross Church and Convent is a Roman Catholic church complex in Green Bay, Wisconsin, with six structures built from 1862 to 1932 in various architectural styles. Currently, it is also a church school. The complex was added to the National Register of Historic Places on June 28, 2001, for its architectural significance.

Holy Cross parish has roots going back to 1834, when Father Van den Broek established a chapel in the Bay Settlement area. Around 1852 Father Edward Daems bought land at the site of the current complex and the parish built a pine church building, which no longer exists. In 1862 the rectory was built next to the pine church. In 1868 a school was added, which no longer exists. Surviving buildings include:

- The Holy Cross Church Rectory was built in 1862, a two-story cube with Italianate details, including a fine wooden bracketed cornice and a hipped roof. Walls are local limestone with quoins of cut stone. In 1900 a block of matching style and materials was added, probably as a kitchen. Another one-story addition was added around 1950.
- The Old White Laundry is a simple one-story frame building built around 1870, on a stone foundation. The north-facing gable has an oculus window. The building is now used for storage and as a root cellar.
- The bathhouse/outhouse, built around 1880 just south of the laundry, is a one-story cube with Italianate details matching the rectory. It is wooden, but the wood is scribed to look like limestone to match the rectory. Inside are two rooms. The front room was a washroom, and the back a privy.
- The Rectory Garage was built in 1930, brick and stone in Craftsman style.
- The current Holy Cross Church was built in 1931 to replace the original 1852 pine church. It was designed by William E. Reynolds of Green Bay in Romanesque Revival style, with an exterior of brown brick. The main entrance is flanked by two square towers, with the left tower larger and holding the original 1852 bell. Inside, the nave has a barrel-vaulted ceiling supported by columns.

The Sisters of St. Francis of the Holy Cross Convent was located to the North of the rectory, and consisted of several sections. A frame convent was built in 1880. In 1916, a two-story red brick building was added to the south of the 1880 section, designed by Foeller, Schober and Berners of Green Bay with Neo-Gothic details. It had a corner turret, a center bay, and a gable roof topped with a stone cross. In 1932 a three-story section was added to the north, designed by William E. Reynolds with Colonial Revival details. After a fire in 1959, the original 1880 convent was replaced with a four-story brick section, joining the other two sections into a U-shaped floorplan. In 2006, The Sisters of St. Francis of the Holy Cross moved into a new convent closer to the bay, to the west. The entire former convent was razed in 2012.
