= Nicolet Bankshares =

U.S. regional bank holding company

Nicolet Bankshares, Inc.
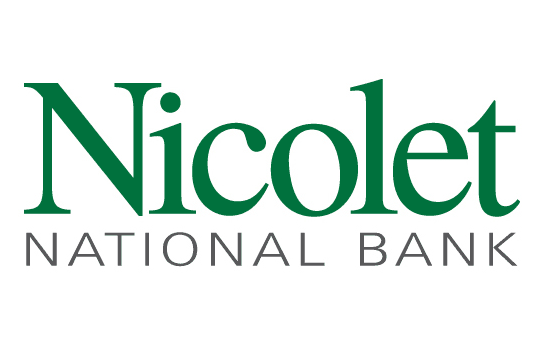
- Type: Public
- Traded as: NYSE: NIC; Russell 2000 component; S&P 600 component
- Industry: Banking, Financial services
- Founded: 2000; 26 years ago
- Headquarters: Green Bay, Wisconsin, United States
- Key people: Michael E. Daniels (president & CEO); Robert Atwell (executive chairman); Ann Lawson (CFO)
- Products: Retail Banking; Commercial Banking; Private Banking; Small Business Lending; Wealth Management
- Total assets: $2.29 billion
- Website: nicoletbank.com

Nicolet Bankshares, Inc. is a U.S. regional bank holding company based in Green Bay, Wisconsin. They are the parent company of Nicolet National Bank, the second largest Wisconsin-based bank.

As of June 30, 2021, it had over $6.1 billion in assets.

== History ==
Nicolet Bankshares was founded in November 2000, after founders Bob Atwell and Mike Daniels felt that the local bank they worked for was getting away from community banking, which they felt was important. In 2010, Nicolet acquired four branches from Anchor Bank. In 2013, they acquired both Mid-Wisconsin Bank and the Bank of Wausau.

In 2015, the company merged with Baylake Bank; the new company took the Nicolet National Bank name. On April 12, 2016, the shareholders of both banks voted in favor of merging the two banks. The $140 million deal closed on April 29, 2016.

In February 2020, Nicolet Bankshares announced plans to acquire West Bend, Wisconsin-based Commerce State Bank and its four branches in a deal valued at $129.6 million. Three months later in May 2020, Nicolet terminated its agreement to acquire Commerce State Bank citing the impact of coronavirus and falling stock price for the publicly traded Nicolet Bank.

On April 26, 2021 Robert B. Atwell left as chief executive officer at Nicolet Bank after 19 years. Mike Daniels was named President and Chief Executive Officer, and Bob Atwell was named Executive Chairman of Nicolet.

On September 3, 2021, Nicolet completed a merger with Mackinac Financial Corporation, headquartered in Manistique, Michigan, and operating as mBank with branches in Michigan's Upper Peninsula and northern Lower Peninsula. Nicolet shuttered the mBank branches in Menominee, Alanson, Kaleva, Mio, West Ishpeming, Negaunee, and the McClellan Avenue branch in Marquette. It also sold the Birmingham branch and lending office in Metro Detroit to the Bank of Ann Arbor.

On August 30, 2022 Nicolet Bankshares, Inc. completed a merger with Charter Bankshares, Inc. As a result, Charter merged with and into Nicolet, with Nicolet being the surviving corporation. Charter Bankshares was valued at 1.1 billion at the time of this acquisition.

In October 2025, Nicolet Bankshares agreed to acquire MidWestOne Financial Group in a $864 million all-stock deal.
