= Kraig Paulsen =

American attorney and politician

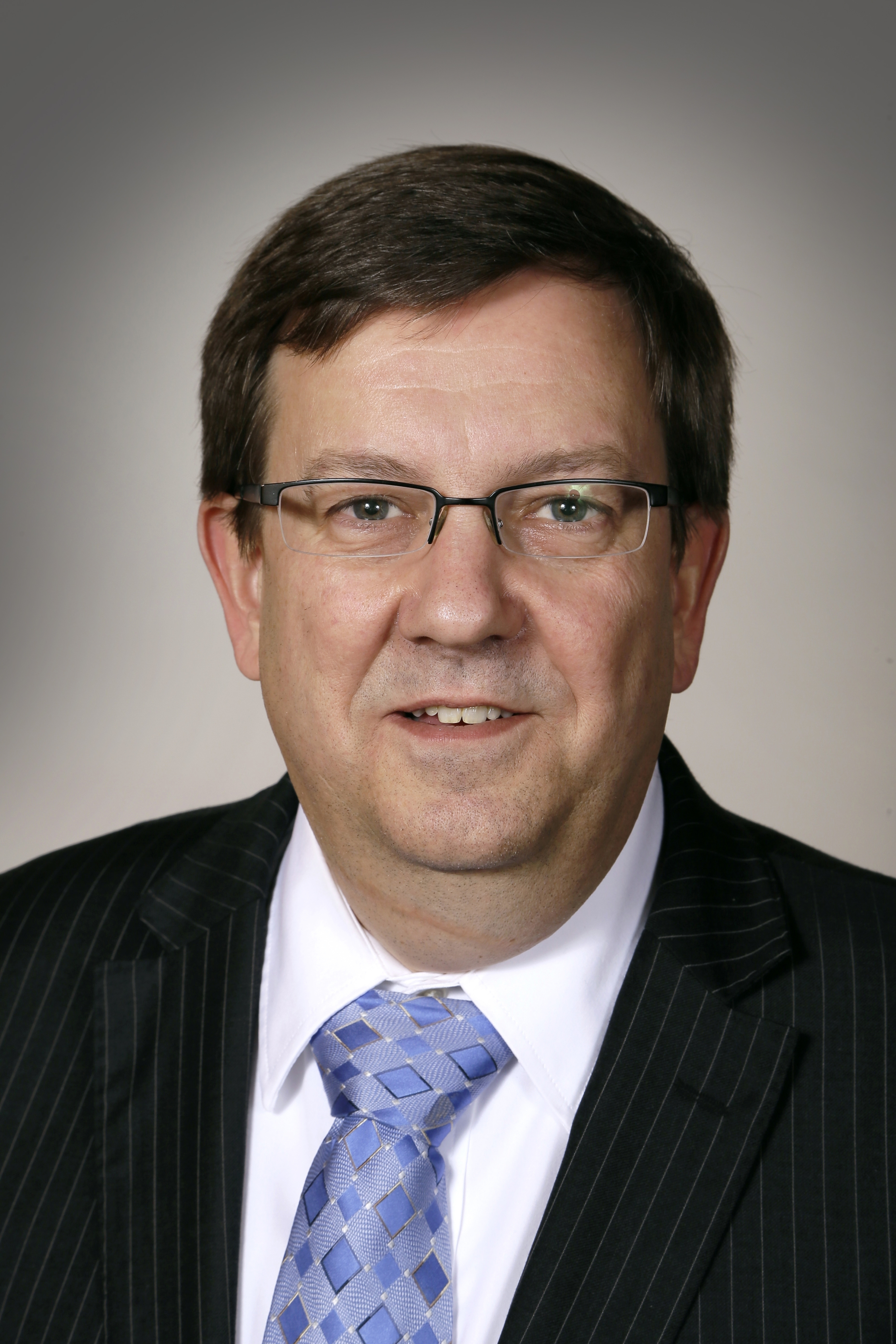
- Official portrait, 2015

Director of the Iowa Department of Management
- Incumbent
- Assumed office September 2021
- Governor: Kim Reynolds
- Preceded by: Mike Bousselot

Director of the Iowa Department of Revenue
- Incumbent
- Assumed office February 2019
- Governor: Kim Reynolds
- Preceded by: Courtney Kay-Decker

Speaker of the Iowa House of Representatives
- In office 2011–2015
- Preceded by: Pat Murphy
- Succeeded by: Linda Upmeyer

Member of the Iowa House of Representatives from the 67th district 35th (2003–2013)
- In office January 2003 – January 2017
- Preceded by: Pam Jochum
- Succeeded by: Ashley Hinson

Personal details
- Born: September 9, 1964 (age 61) Monticello, Iowa, U.S.
- Party: Republican
- Children: 4
- Education: Iowa State University (BBA); Embry–Riddle Aeronautical University (MBA); University of Iowa (JD)
- Website: House website

Military service
- Branch/service: United States Air Force

Kraig Paulsen (born September 9, 1964) is an American attorney and politician who served as a member of the Iowa House of Representatives from 2003 to 2017 and as speaker of the Iowa House of Representatives from 2011 to 2015.

== Early life and education ==
Paulsen was born in Monticello, Iowa. His father, Dr. Kenneth Paulsen, is a veterinarian. His mother, Marilyn Felker, is a retired hospital transcription manager. Paulsen has one brother and two sisters. He graduated from John F. Kennedy High School. He earned a Bachelor of Business Administration from Iowa State University 1987, an MBA from Embry–Riddle Aeronautical University in 1994, and a Juris Doctor from the University of Iowa College of Law in 2003.

== Career ==
Paulsen served United States Air Force, where he served as an operations group senior weapons instructor, maintenance flight commander, and squadron director of operations.

Paulsen was awarded the Meritorious Service Medal with one Oak Leaf Cluster, the USAF Commendation Medal, and the USAF Achievement Medal with one Oak Leaf Cluster. He was twice recognized as the Best Operations Crew in the USAF in his assigned weapon system, Air Force Space Command Maintenance Junior Officer Manager of the Year, and the Missile Wing Instructor of the Year.

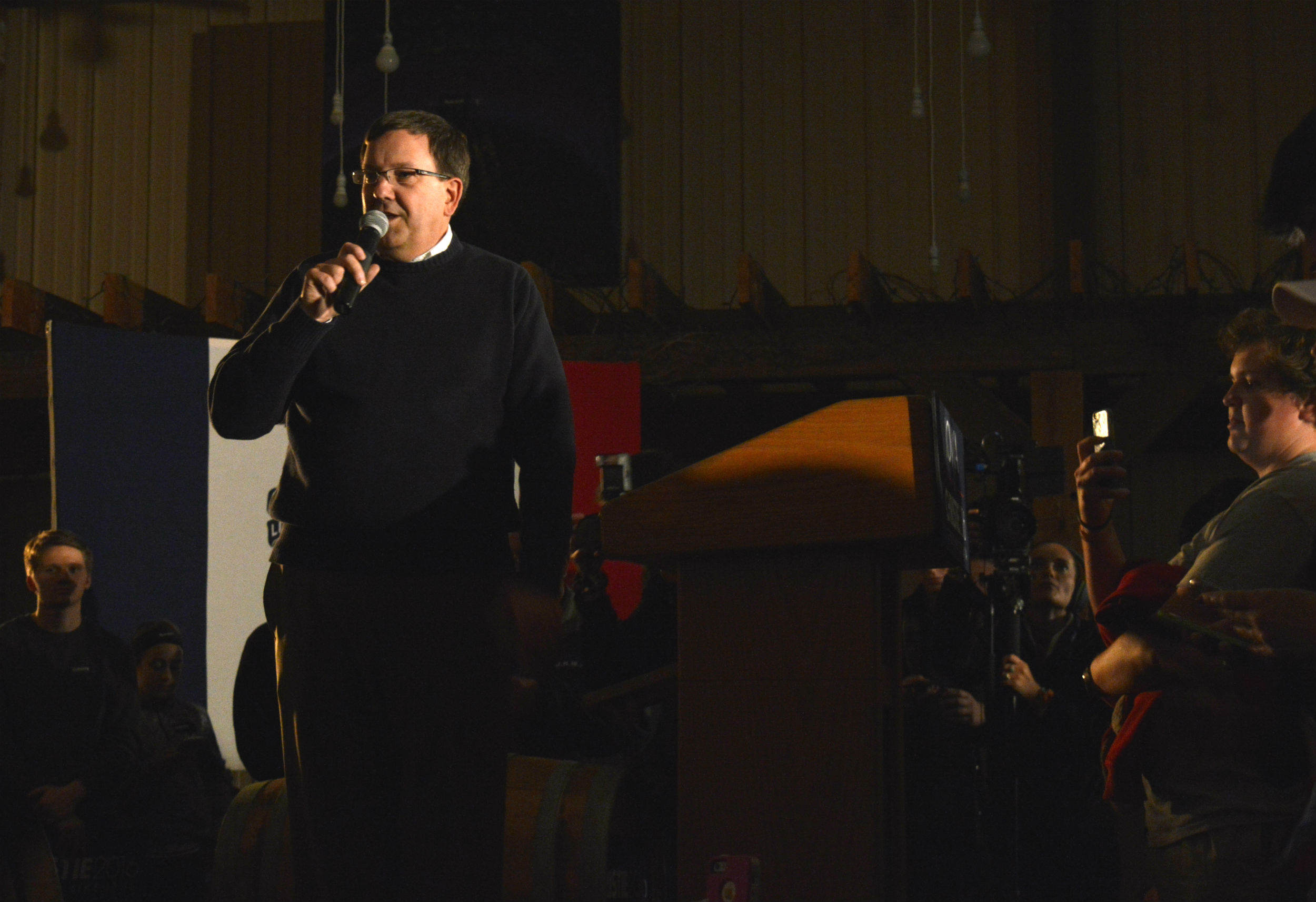
Paulsen speaking in 2016, at a rally for Chris Christie

Paulsen was first elected to the Iowa House in 2002 and serves House District 67, which includes: Hiawatha, Robins and portions of both Marion and Cedar Rapids. He served as speaker of the House from 2011 to 2015.

Paulsen was an attorney for CRST International, Inc. in Cedar Rapids.

In August 2015, Paulsen announced that he would step down as speaker of the House in January 2016 and would not seek re-election to the Iowa House in 2016. Paulsen then took an unadvertised position with Iowa State University in January 2016; leading a new supply chain initiative aimed at improving corporate engagement in research, experiential learning for students, and educational outreach for faculty and staff. The job Paulsen accepted was not advertised, as is required in most cases.

In 2019, Paulsen was appointed director of the Iowa Department of Revenue. In September 2021, he was appointed interim director of the Iowa Department of Management. Later, it was announced that Paulsen would continue in the role permanently and remain in the position as revenue director.

== Personal life ==
Paulsen married his high school sweetheart, Cathy, in Cedar Rapids in 1985. They have four children, a daughter and three sons. The Paulsen family are members of the New Covenant Bible Church in Cedar Rapids.

Iowa House of Representatives
| Preceded by Pam Jochum | Member of the Iowa House of Representatives from the 35th district 2003–2013 | Succeeded by Ako Abdul-Samad |
| Preceded by Kevin McCarthy | Member of the Iowa House of Representatives from the 67th district 2013–2017 | Succeeded by Ashley Hinson |
