= Del Stromer =

American politician

Member of the Iowa House of Representatives from the 86th district
- In office January 9, 1967 – January 10, 1971
- Preceded by: Vic Steuland

Member of the Iowa House of Representatives from the 8th district
- In office January 11, 1971 – January 7, 1973
- Succeeded by: Terry Branstad

Member of the Iowa House of Representatives from the 9th district
- In office January 8, 1973 – January 9, 1983

Member of the Iowa House of Representatives from the 17th district
- In office January 10, 1983 – January 13, 1991

Personal details
- Born: Delwyn Dean Stromer; April 22, 1930 Garner, Iowa, US
- Died: September 7, 2003 (aged 73) West Des Moines, Iowa, US
- Resting place: Concord Township Cemetery, Garner, Iowa
- Party: Republican
- Spouse(s): Harriet June Ostendorf (m. 1950–2003); his death
- Children: David, Pamela and Linda
- Website: Legislative website

Delwyn Dean Stromer (April 22, 1930 – September 7, 2003) was an American politician who served in the Iowa House of Representatives from 1967 to 1991. He served as Speaker of the Iowa House for two years, from 1981 to 1982. Stromer was a member of the United States Army Reserve from 1951 to 1959, and served on active duty from 1953 to 1955. He died in 2003 at Mercy Medical Center in West Des Moines of cardiovascular disease complications.
