= 2016 Iowa elections =

The 2016 Iowa general elections were held in the U.S. state of Iowa on November 8, 2016. One of Iowa's U.S. Senate seats and all four seats in the United States House of Representatives were up for election, as well as half of the Iowa Senate seats and all of the Iowa House of Representatives seats. Primary elections were held on June 7, 2016.

The Iowa Republican Party made large gains in the election, increasing its majority in the State House and taking control of the State Senate, giving the state a Republican trifecta for the first time since 1996.

== U.S. Senate ==
Incumbent Republican Senator Chuck Grassley sought re-election to a seventh term. Grassley defeated Democratic nominee Patty Judge and several third-party candidates in the general election, winning 60.09% of the vote.

== U.S. House of Representatives ==
All of Iowa's four seats in the United States House of Representatives were up for election in November. Party control remained unchanged after the general election.

== Iowa Senate ==
The 25 even-numbered Iowa Senate seats were up for election.

Affiliation	Party (Shading indicates majority caucus)			Total	
Affiliation	Democratic	Republican	Independent	Total	Vacant
Before 2016 elections	26	23	1	50	0
Latest voting share	52%	46%	2%		
After 2016 elections	20	29	1	50	0
New voting share	40%	58%	2%		

== Iowa House of Representatives ==
All 100 seats in the Iowa House of Representatives were up for election.

Affiliation	Party (Shading indicates majority caucus)		Total	
Affiliation	Republican	Democratic	Total	Vacant
Before 2016 elections	57	43	100	0
Latest voting share	57%	43%		
After 2016 elections	59	41	100	0
New voting share	59%	41%		
