= Chip Baltimore =

American politician

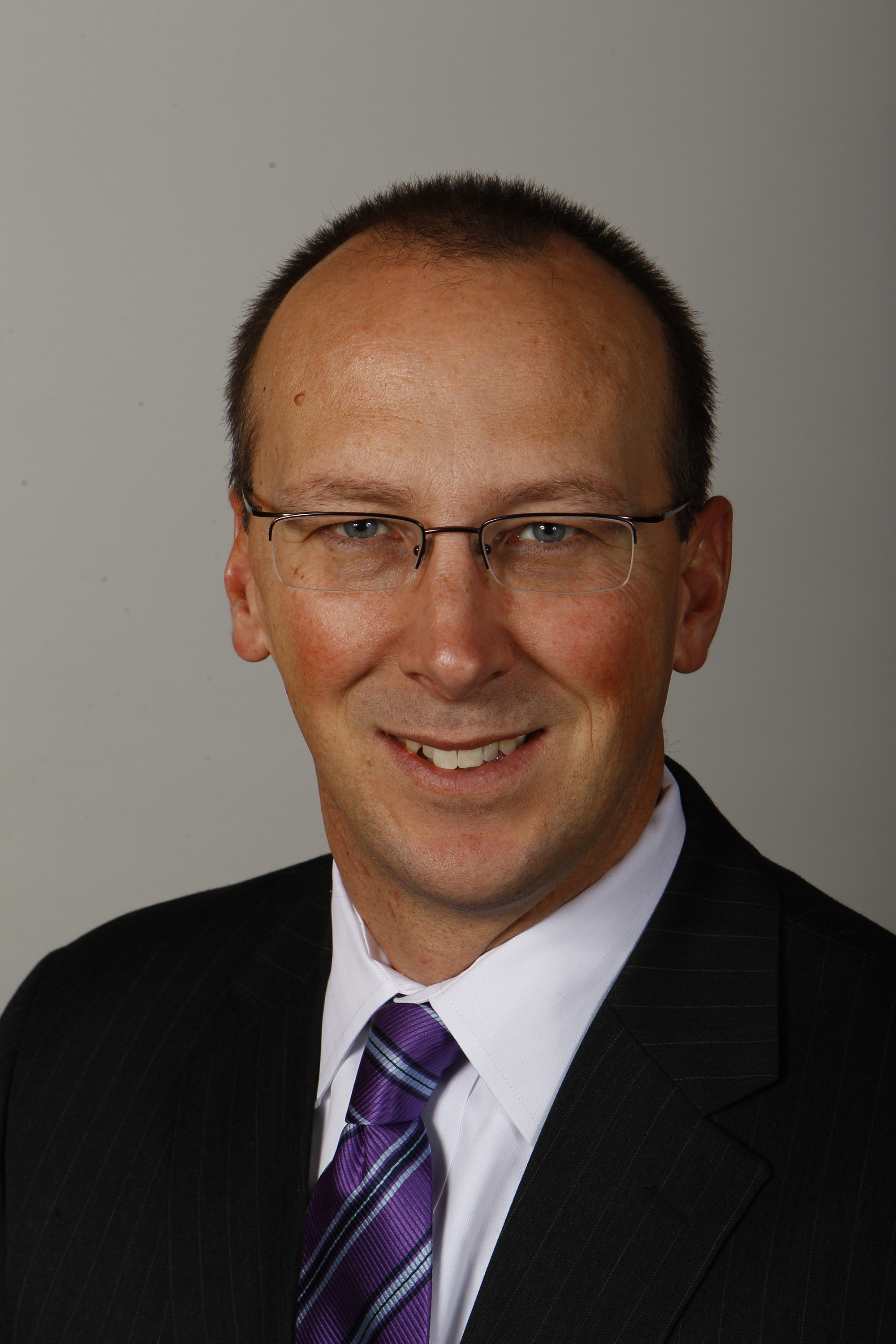

Member of the Iowa House of Representatives
- In office January 10, 2011 – January 14, 2019
- Preceded by: Donovan Olson
- Succeeded by: Phil Thompson
- Constituency: 48th (2011–2013); 47th (2013–2019)

Personal details
- Born: 1966 (age 59–60) Oskaloosa, Iowa, U.S.
- Party: Republican
- Children: 2
- Education: Iowa State University (BBA); University of Minnesota (JD)
- Profession: Attorney

Chip Baltimore is an American attorney and politician who served as a member of the Iowa House of Representatives from 2011 to 2019.

== Early life and education ==
Baltimore was born in Oskaloosa, Iowa in 1966. He was raised on a farm with his two siblings. After graduating from Oskaloosa Senior High School in 1984, he earned a Bachelor of Business Administration degree in finance and economics from Iowa State University and a Juris Doctor from the University of Minnesota Law School.

== Career ==
For most of his legal career he has practiced law in Boone, Iowa. Baltimore was first elected to the Iowa House of Representatives in 2010.

Baltimore served on several committees in the Iowa House, including the Commerce and Ways and Means committees, as well as the Justice Systems Appropriations Budget Subcommittee. He formerly served as the chair of the House Judiciary Committee. Baltimore did not seek re-election in 2018 and left office in January 2019.

In 2018, Baltimore pled guilty to operating a vehicle while intoxicated and possession of a dangerous weapon while under the influence. The plea was related to a traffic stop on January 19, 2018, in response to a report of a reckless driver.

Iowa House of Representatives
Preceded by Donovan Olson	48th District; 2011–2013	Succeeded by Rob Bacon
Preceded by Ralph Watts	47th District; 2013–present	Succeeded by Incumbent
