= Iowa's 23rd House of Representatives district =

American legislative district

House District 23
- Type: District of the Lower house
- Location: Iowa
- Representative: Ray Sorensen
- Parent organization: Iowa General Assembly

The 23rd District of the Iowa House of Representatives in the state of Iowa. It is currently composed of Adair and Madison Counties, as well as part of Dallas, Union, and Clarke Counties.

== Current elected officials ==
Ray Sorensen is the representative currently representing the district.

== Past representatives ==
The district has previously been represented by:

- Leonard C. Andersen, 1971–1973
- Scott Newhard, 1973–1979
- Andy McKean, 1979–1983
- Marv Diemer, 1983–1993
- William Witt, 1993–2003
- Dan Rasmussen, 2003–2009
- Gene Ficken, 2009–2011
- Dan Rasmussen, 2011–2013
- Mark Costello, 2013–2015
- David Sieck, 2015–2023
