= Paul Copenhaver =

American politician (1941–2014)

Member of the Iowa House of Representatives from the 58th district
- In office January 10, 1983 – January 13, 1985
- Preceded by: Philip Davitt
- Succeeded by: Mike Van Camp

Member of the Iowa House of Representatives from the 32nd district
- In office March 23, 1982 – January 9, 1983
- Preceded by: Kenneth Miller
- Succeeded by: Roger Halvorson

Personal details
- Born: September 3, 1941 Independence, Iowa
- Died: April 26, 2014 (aged 72) Washington, D.C.
- Party: Democratic

Paul G. Copenhaver (September 3, 1941 – April 26, 2014) was an American politician who served in the Iowa House of Representatives from 1982 to 1985.

He died of bladder cancer on April 26, 2014, in Washington, D.C. at age 72.
