= Iowa's 58th House of Representatives district =

NE Iowa House of Rep District

House District 58
- District 58 boundaries since 2023
- Type: District of the Iowa House of Representatives
- Location: Iowa
- Representative: Charley Thomson
- Parent organization: Iowa General Assembly

The 58th District of the Iowa House of Representatives is located in northeastern Iowa. As of the 2021 redistricting, it includes all of Chickasaw County and parts of Floyd and Bremer Counties.

== Geography ==
Larger towns in the district include Charles City, New Hampton, Oelwein, and Nashua.

== Demographics ==
According to 2019–2023 American Community Survey estimates, the district has:

- Median household income: approximately $71,800
- Predominantly rural population

== 2021 redistricting ==
In 2021, the Iowa Legislative Services Agency redrew state legislative districts based on the 2020 Census. The updated boundaries took effect for the 2022 elections, shifting District 58 to encompass all of Chickasaw County and parts of Floyd and Bremer Counties.

== Current elected officials ==
Charley Thomson (Republican) is the current representative for the district. He was first elected in 2022 and took office on January 9, 2023.

== Past representatives ==
The district has previously been represented by:

- Norman G. Jesse, 1971–1973
- Glen E. Bortell, 1973–1977
- Philip A. Davitt, 1977–1983
- Mike Van Camp, 1983–1989
- Jim Lykam, 1989–1991
- Steven Grubbs, 1991–1993
- Dennis Black, 1993–1995
- Danny Carroll, 1995–2003
- Clel Baudler, 2003–2013
- Brian Moore, 2013–2017
- Andy McKean, 2017–2021
- Steve Bradley, 2021–2023
- Charley Thomson, 2023–present

== Recent elections ==
Year	Republican	Democratic	Other	Total votes	Winner
2022	Charley Thomson – 7,376 (59.1%)	Dene Lundberg – 5,090 (40.8%)	14 (<0.1%)	12,480	Charley Thomson
2024	Charley Thomson – 10,060 (63.4%)	Gail Allison – 5,782 (36.4%)	21 (<0.1%)	15,863	Charley Thomson
