= Iowa's 20th House of Representatives district =

American legislative district

House District 20
- Type: District of the Lower house
- Location: Iowa
- Representative: Josh Turek
- Parent organization: Iowa General Assembly

The 20th District of the Iowa House of Representatives in the state of Iowa is part of Pottawattamie County. The seat is currently held by Iowa Senator-elect Josh Turek.

== Representatives ==
The district has been represented by:

- John W. Patten, 1971–1973
- Robert M. Carr, 1973–1975
- Tom Tauke, 1975–1979
- Mike Connolly, 1979–1983
- John D. Groninga, 1983–1993
- Dennis J. May, 1993–2003
- Willard Jenkins, 2003–2007
- Doris Kelley, 2007–2011
- Walt Rogers, 2011–2013
- Clel Baudler, 2013–2019
- Ray Sorensen, 2019–2023
- Josh Turek, 2023–2027
- Eric Armstrong 2027–Present
