= Marv Diemer =

American politician (1924–2013)

Member of the Iowa House of Representatives from the 23rd district
- In office January 10, 1983 – January 10, 1993
- Preceded by: Andy McKean
- Succeeded by: William Witt

Member of the Iowa House of Representatives from the 36th district
- In office January 8, 1979 – January 9, 1983
- Preceded by: Mary O'Halloran
- Succeeded by: Thomas J. Jochum

Personal details
- Born: Marvin E. Diemer; May 30, 1924 New Auburn, Minnesota, U.S.
- Died: April 23, 2013 (aged 88) Cedar Falls, Iowa, U.S.
- Party: Republican
- Spouse: Lois Fullbright (m. 1954)
- Children: 3
- Education: Drake University
- Occupation: Politician, businessman

Military service
- Allegiance: United States
- Branch/service: United States Marine Corps
- Battles/wars: World War II

Marvin E. "Marv" Diemer (May 30, 1924 – April 23, 2013) was an American businessman and legislator.

Born in New Auburn, Minnesota, Diemer served in the United States Marine Corps during World War II. He graduated from Drake University in 1950 and was a public accountant in Cedar Falls, Iowa. He served in the Iowa House of Representatives as a Republican 1979–1991. He died in Cedar Falls, Iowa.
