= James W. Burke =

American politician (1932–1983)

Member of the Iowa House of Representatives from the 58th district
- In office 1965–1967

Personal details
- Born: January 23, 1932 Sioux City, Iowa, U.S.
- Died: March 25, 1983 (aged 51)
- Party: Democratic
- Education: Morningside College; University of Iowa

James W. Burke (January 23, 1932 – March 25, 1983) was an American politician. He served as a Democratic member for the 58th district of the Iowa House of Representatives.

== Life and career ==
Burke was born in Sioux City, Iowa. He attended Morningside College and the University of Iowa.

Burke was a real estate salesman.

Burke served in the Iowa House of Representatives from 1965 to 1967.

Burke died on March 25, 1983, at the age of 51.
