= Iowa Freedom Rock Tour =

Painted boulder in Iowa, United States

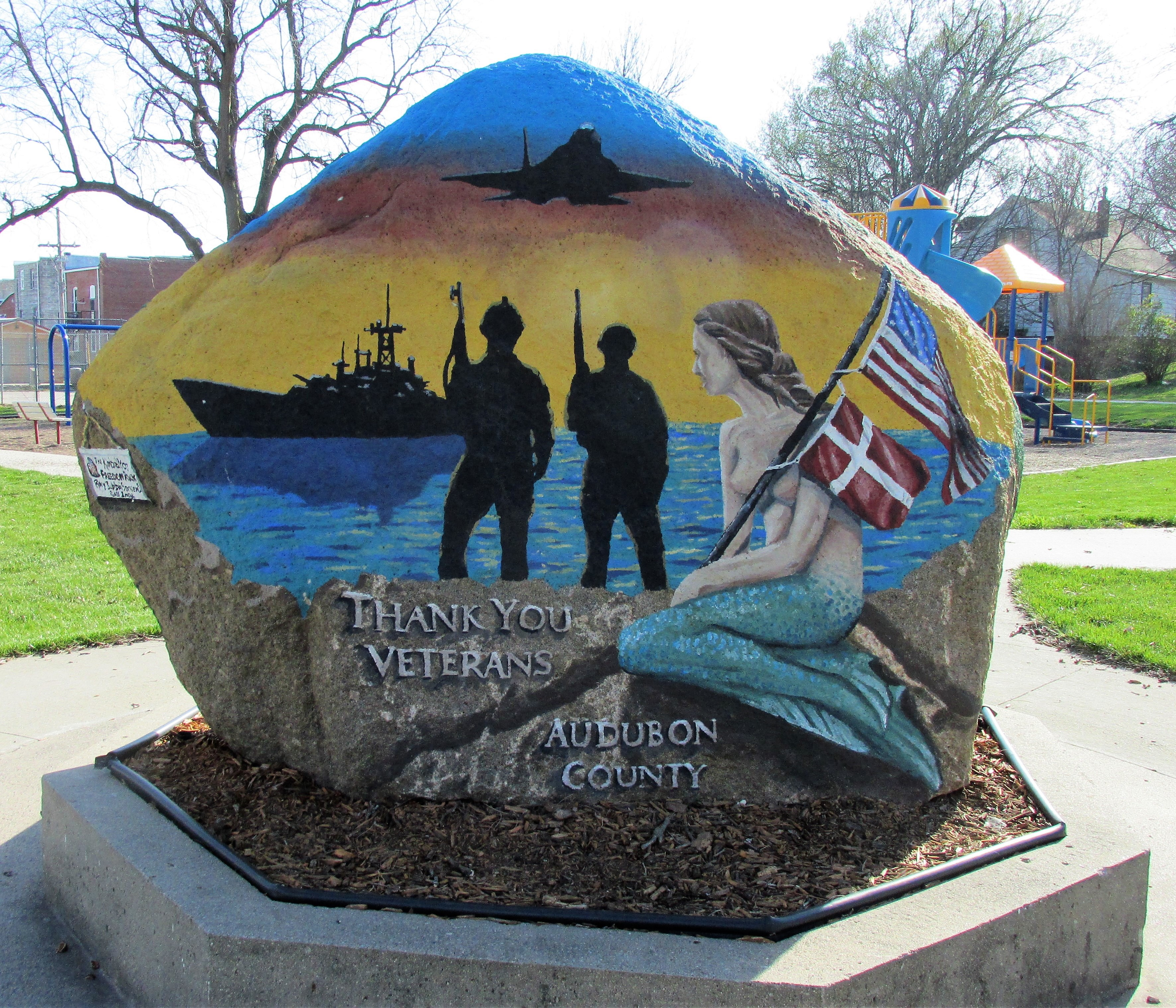
Freedom Rock in Kimballton, Iowa

The Iowa Freedom Rock Tour was an initiative started in 2013 by Ray "Bubba" Sorensen II to paint boulders with patriotic motifs in each county of Iowa. It began after the continued interest in the original Freedom Rock in Adair county, which the artist had been painting each year since 1999 for Memorial Day. As of 2023, Sorensen has completed his goal, and has also contributed to rock murals in six additional states.

== Background ==
The Freedom Rock (also known as the Patriotic Rock) is a 12-foot-tall (3.7 m) boulder located along Iowa Highway 25 at 2301-2319 120th Street — in Adair County and southwest of Menlo in western Iowa approximately one mile (1.6 km) south of exit 86 (Iowa 25 – Guthrie Center, Greenfield) on Interstate 80. The boulder weighs approximately 56 short tons (51 t; 50 long tons).

The rock is located on private property and was used for graffiti. Since 1999, however, it is repainted every year in time for Memorial Day with the purpose of thanking U.S. veterans and their families for their military service and sacrifice. The rock is painted by Bubba Sorensen II from Greenfield. Sorensen is not commissioned or paid to paint The Freedom Rock, he uses his own money along with donations and sales of Freedom Rock merchandise to fund the project. After watching Saving Private Ryan as a 19 year old at Iowa State University in 1999, Bubba was moved and painted the first Freedom Rock before Memorial Day with the words "THANK YOU VETERANS FOR OUR FREEDOM" over a painting of the six Marines raising the United States flag atop Mount Suribachi on Iwo Jima.

For the 25th anniversary of the Freedom Rock in 2023, Sorensen celebrated Medal of Honor recipients by painting images of WWI veteran USA Corporal Freddie Stowers, WWII veteran USN Commander Samuel D. Dealey, Korean War veteran USA Private First Class Jack Glennon Hanson, Vietnam veterans USAF pararescueman Staff Sergeant William H. Pitsenbarger and USMC Lance Corporal Miguel Keith and Afghanistan veteran and Navy SEAL Lieutenant Michael P. Murphy.

== Iowa Freedom Rock Tour ==
In the Spring of 2013, Sorensen began The Iowa Freedom Rock Tour by painting a Freedom Rock (patriotic themed rock) in every county in Iowa at a cost of US$5,000 plus lodging and supplies per rock, creating a unique statewide veterans memorial. The rocks placed in each county will not be repainted every year. He expected to take ten years to complete the painting of a freedom rock in each of Iowa's 99 counties, but during a 2016 update interview, he revealed he only had ten more counties in Iowa to book.

On October 27, 2016, the Greene County's Freedom Rock, which is located in front of the grain elevator in, Jefferson became the 55th rock he has painted in Iowa. On November 11, 2018, a Freedom Rock was unveiled at the Iowa Veterans Cemetery near Van Meter, Iowa. In 2021 on the 20th anniversary of 9/11 attacks in 2001, he painted portraits on the first Freedom Rock, which is located near Menlo, honoring Oscar Austin, Pat Tillman, and others.

On September 18, 2021, he completed The Iowa Freedom Rock Tour with the unveiling of his ninety-ninth Freedom Rock in Iowa which is located at the Central City Fairgrounds in Linn County, Iowa.

Sorenson returned to paint one final Freedom Rock, his hundredth, in Altoona, Iowa, at Adventureland near the Adventureland Inn. It is his last Freedom Rock painted during his Iowa Freedom Rock Tour. His last Freedom Rock was to be auctioned off on Veterans Day 2021.

== National tour plans ==
Sorenson stated in 2016 that after his Iowa tour, he planned to begin a nationwide 50 state tour.

As of June 1, 2021, he has painted Freedom Rocks in Minnesota, Wisconsin, Missouri, and Washington. As of September 27, 2021, he had painted additional Freedom Rocks in both Nebraska and North Dakota for a total of seven states with Freedom Rocks.
