= Mark Costello (Iowa politician) =

American politician (born 1961)

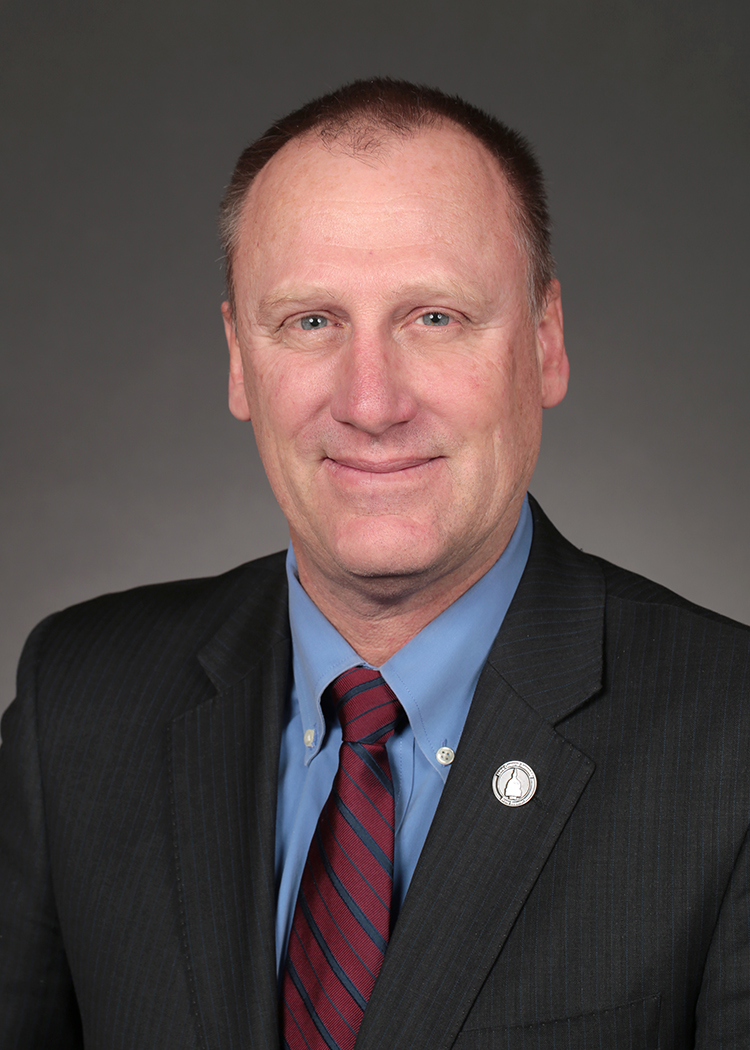

Member of the Iowa Senate from the 8th district
- Incumbent
- Assumed office January 12, 2015
- Preceded by: Joni Ernst
- Constituency: 8th District - (2023-Present); 12th District - (2015-2023)

Member of the Iowa House of Representatives from the 23rd district
- In office January 14, 2013 – December 30, 2014
- Preceded by: Dan Rasmussen
- Succeeded by: David Sieck

Personal details
- Born: October 24, 1961 (age 64) Omaha, Nebraska, U.S.
- Party: Republican
- Spouse: Rachel Costello
- Children: 5
- Education: University of Northern Iowa (BA)

Mark Costello (born October 24, 1961) is the Iowa State Senator from the 8th District. A Republican, he has served in the Iowa Senate since being elected in 2014. He had also previously served in the Iowa House of Representatives from 2013–2014.

== Biography ==
Costello was born in Omaha, Nebraska but moved to Imogene, Iowa as a kid. He graduated from Nishna Valley High School before going on to attend the University of Northern Iowa, receiving a B.A. in computer information systems.

After college Costello worked five years as a computer analyst with Garst Seed Company based in Coon Rapids before eventually returning to work on his family farm.

He and his wife Rachel were married in 2001. They have five children.

== Iowa House of Representatives ==
Mark Costello (R-Imogene) was first elected to the Iowa House in 2012 representing the 23rd District.

Mark served as Vice Chair of the Iowa House Health & Human Resources Budget Subcommittee. His other committee assignments of the 85th General Assembly include Human Resources, State Government, Veterans Affairs, and Labor.

== Iowa Senate ==
He won the December 30, 2014 special election to replace Joni Ernst in the Iowa State Senate after she was elected to the U.S. Senate. Ernst's predecessor in the 12th Senate district, Kim Reynolds, also went on to be elected statewide as Governor.

As of February 2020, Costello serves on the following committees: Ethics (Chair), Agriculture, Appropriations, Human Resources, and Veterans Affairs. He also serves on the Health and Human Services Appropriations Subcommittee (Chair), as well as the Health Policy Oversight Committee, Administrative Rules Review Committee, and the Medical Assistance Advisory Council.

== Electoral history ==
Election	Political result	Candidate	Party	Votes	%
Iowa House of Representatives primary elections, 2012; District 23; Turnout: 3,183	Republican	Mark Costello	Republican	1,710	53.72%
Iowa House of Representatives primary elections, 2012; District 23; Turnout: 3,183	Republican	Raymond Chase	Republican	854	26.83%
Iowa House of Representatives general election, 2012; District 23	Republican (newly redistricted)	Mark Costello	Republican	unopposed	

Iowa Senate 12th District special election, 2014
Party	Candidate	Votes	%
Republican	Mark Costello	3,138	74.7%
Democratic	Steven L. Adams	932	22.2%
Libertarian	Don W. Brantz	132	3.1%
Republican hold			

Iowa Senate 12th District election, 2016
Party	Candidate	Votes	%
Republican	Mark Costello	20,012	78.37%
Libertarian	Don Brantz	5,524	21.63%
Republican hold			

Iowa Senate
Preceded by Dan Dawson	8th District; 2023 – present	Succeeded by Incumbent
Preceded by Joni Ernst	12th District; 2015-2022	Succeeded by Amy Sinclair
Iowa House of Representatives
Preceded by Dan Rasmussen	23rd District; 2013-2014	Succeeded by David Sieck
