= New Auburn =

New Auburn is the name of several towns in the United States:

- New Auburn, Minnesota
- New Auburn, Wisconsin

== See also ==
- "New Auburn", a song by Big Red Machine featuring Anaïs Mitchell from the album How Long Do You Think It's Gonna Last?
