= List of killings by law enforcement officers in the United States, December 2022 =

This is a list of people reported killed by non-military law enforcement officers in the United States in December 2022, whether in the line of duty or not, and regardless of reason or method. The listing documents the occurrence of a death, making no implications regarding wrongdoing or justification on the part of the person killed or officer involved. Killings are arranged by date of the incident that caused death. Different death dates, if known, are noted in the description. The table below lists 116 people.

== December 2022 ==
Date	Name (age) of deceased	Race of deceased	Location	Description
2022-12-31	Margaret Dunn (17)	White	Addis, Louisiana	Police pursued a 24-year-old man for breaking into a home and stealing a vehicle. During the chase, a police car T-boned an uninvolved vehicle, killing two teenagers and injuring a man in the backseat. The 24-year-old man was charged with two counts of manslaughter. David Cauthron, the officer involved, was charged with negligent homicide.
2022-12-31	Carolina Gill (15)	White	Addis, Louisiana	Police pursued a 24-year-old man for breaking into a home and stealing a vehicle. During the chase, a police car T-boned an uninvolved vehicle, killing two teenagers and injuring a man in the backseat. The 24-year-old man was charged with two counts of manslaughter. David Cauthron, the officer involved, was charged with negligent homicide.
2022-12-31	Keith Murriel (41)	Black	Jackson, Mississippi	Police attempted to arrest Murriel for trespassing at a hotel on New Year's Eve. Police tased Murriel several times before placing him in a patrol vehicle, where he died. Two of the three officers involved were later charged with murder, and the third with manslaughter.
2022-12-31	Brandon Lynch (27)	White	Olathe, Kansas	
2022-12-31	Cody Wyatt Foos (27)	White	Tulsa, Oklahoma	
2022-12-31	James Allandale (61)	White	Pine Brook, New Jersey	
2022-12-30	Jacquline "Laney" Hudson (13)	White	Huntington, West Virginia	An off-duty deputy in a police cruiser drove through an intersection with a green light, striking Hudson. The deputy passed a field sobriety test at the scene.
2022-12-30	Unknown (30s)	Unknown	Houston, Texas	An officer struck a pedestrian crossing a freeway while responding to a non-emergency call.
2022-12-30	Dillion Pugsley (29)	White	Tacoma, Washington	Law enforcement responded to reports of shots fired, then engaged in a chase that ended with a police shooting. Police shot and killed Pugsley who they allege shot at them during the pursuit.
2022-12-30	William Allen Konkol (60)	White	Las Vegas, Nevada	
2022-12-30	Thomas Marshall (53)	Unknown	Kansas City, Kansas	
2022-12-29	William Shae McKay (44)	White	Norco, California	McKay killed a sheriff’s deputy during a traffic stop in the city of Jurupa Valley, east of Los Angeles. He escaped with a truck which became disabled on the Interstate 15 in Norco, and was shot and killed in the back by police.
2022-12-29	Michael J. Hanna (49)	White	West Fork, AR	
2022-12-29	Edward Townsend III (35)	White	The Villages, FL	
2022-12-29	Reynaldo Ricarde (29)	Unknown	Kahului, Hawaii	Police responded to reports of a suicidal man and encountered Ricarde, who had stabbed himself. An officer shot Ricarde after he charged at the officer holding a knife sharpener.
2022-12-29	Quayshawn Samuel (31)	Black	New York City, New York	
2022-12-29	Damean Alexander Jones (26)	White	Chattanooga, Tennessee	
2022-12-29	Randy Ness (57)	White	Post Falls, Idaho	
2022-12-28	Warren Merriman	Hispanic	San Bernardino, California	
2022-12-28	Terry Bowman (39)	White	Kansas City, Missouri	
2022-12-28	Enrique Lopez (56)	Hispanic	Long Island, New York	
2022-12-28	Nicholas Lassiter (32)	White	Amelia County, Virginia	
2022-12-27	Monet Darrisaw (34)	Black	Charlotte, NC	
2022-12-27	Sebastian Frank Osborn (29)	Unknown	Greeley, Colorado	
2022-12-26	Jenkins, Trevontay (16)	Black	Des Moines, Iowa	
2022-12-26	Zachary Dennis Zoran (34)	White	Barberton, Ohio	
2022-12-26	Jose Palacios Pascacio (46)	Hispanic	Hurricane, UT	
2022-12-25	Gabriel Navarro	Hispanic	Victorville, CA	
2022-12-25	Kyle Lobo (36)	Latino	San Marcos, Texas	Police responded to reports of an assault at an apartment and encountered Lobo, holding a child and a gun. Lobo handed the child to the woman who called, then allegedly pulled his gun, leading officers to shoot. Lobo was a former San Marcos Police officer who had resigned earlier in the year after he was charged with continuous violence against the family and injury to a child.
2022-12-24	Unidentified person	Unknown	El Centro, California	
2022-12-24	Michael Lee Delaney Jr. (32)	Black	Weatherford, Texas	
2022-12-23	Patrick Alexander (20)	Unknown	Fairbanks, Alaska	
2022-12-23	Rigo Mendez (39)	Hispanic	Weslaco, Texas	
2022-12-22	Willie Pendleton (61)	Black	Gardena, California	
2022-12-22	Deshawn L. Jones (45)	Black	Portsmouth, Virginia	
2022-12-22	Robert Allen Vancleave	White	Quitman, Texas	Vancleave was unarmed.
2022-12-21	Unnamed person (29)	White	West Valley City, Utah	
2022-12-21	Todd I. Jordan (53)	White	Sidney, Ohio	
2022-12-21	Fernando Fierro (44)	Hispanic	Lancaster, California	
2022-12-21	Brendan Pinkston (23)	White	Genesee County, Michigan	Pinkston was shot and killed by Genesee County Sheriff's Deputy as the two exchanged gunshots during an on-foot chase after Pinkston fell while climbing a fence. Initial reporting and police press releases suggested a second officer was shot by Pinkston, but later body camera footage showed that the second officer was actually shot by friendly fire from a third officer after the initial shooting had taken place.
2022-12-21	Corlunda McGinister (21)	Black	Richland, Mississippi	
2022-12-20	Travis Wayne Hellinger (38)	White	LaRue, Ohio	
2022-12-20	Ryan Eric Scholsser (30)	White	Holly Springs, North Carolina	
2022-12-20	Stanley Stubblefield (66)	White	Milwaukee, Wisconsin	
2022-12-20	Unnamed man	Unknown	Bakersfield, California	
2022-12-19	Brandon Varao (28)	Unknown	King City, California	
2022-12-19	Matthew C. Lopez (32)	Unknown	Kenosha, Wisconsin	
2022-12-19	Michael Cline (35)	White	Louisa County, Virginia	
2022-12-19	Unnamed man	Unknown	Berkeley County, West Virginia	
2022-12-18	Bradley Munroe (32)	Unknown	Chula Vista, California	
2022-12-18	Ali Naji (33)	Unknown	Dearborn, Michigan	Naji entered the Dearborn police station with a loaded gun and attempted to shoot an officer in the lobby. He was then shot and killed by the officer.
2022-12-18	Guillermo Medina (39)	Latino	Culver City, California	Police responded to a call that a man had threatened his wife with a handgun. Police pursued Medina through several neighborhoods before he crashed in Culver City and fled on foot, after which police shot him. According to body camera video, officers shot Medina after mistaking a cellphone for a gun. A replica handgun was found in the crashed vehicle.
2022-12-17	Joseph R. Coons (38)	White	Longview, WA	
2022-12-17	Unnamed male	Unknown	Orem, Utah	
2022-12-17	Victor Melendez (33)	Unknown	Tulare County, California	Melendez was unarmed.
2022-12-17	Alan Perez (51)	Latino	Opelika, Alabama	
2022-12-17	Unnamed person	Unknown	McDowell County, West Virginia	
2022-12-16	Nelson Graham (33)	Black	Augusta, GA	
2022-12-16	Arden Charles "Ace" Post (57)	Native American	Ballard, Utah	
2022-12-16	Mauricio Cisneros (47)	Latino	Evansville, Indiana	Police responded to a 911 hang-up call and encountered Cisneros holding a knife. After six minutes and 25 seconds of speaking with Cisneros, he stood up with the knife, and an officer tased him. He moved into a corner on the floor, and an officer shot him.
2022-12-16	Jaylin Keshawn McKenzie (21)	Black	Memphis, Tennessee	
2022-12-15	William Foxx Blakely	White	Belton, Missouri	
2022-12-15	Brent Alsleben (34)	White	New Auburn, Minnesota	Overnight, Alsleben was fatally shot during an encounter with Sibley County law enforcement.
2022-12-15	Brent Lee Kopacka (35)	White	Pullman, Washington	Officers responded to Kopacka threatening to kill his two roommates. After the roommates were removed, Kopacka barricaded himself inside and fired several shots. At some point, he was shot and killed by a SWAT officer.
2022-12-15	Brent A. Alsleben (34)	White	New Auburn, Minnesota	
2022-12-15	Jacob Cole Barnes	White	Stuttgart, Arkansas	
2022-12-14	Name Withheld	Unknown race	Miami, FL	
2022-12-14	Katie Lynn Powers (40)	White	Waukesha, Wisconsin	
2022-12-14	Amy Anderson (43)	White	Bay St. Louis, Mississippi	Police were called to a motel parking lot, where Anderson said she and her child were being followed. After the officers spoke with Anderson for around 40 minutes, she shot at them, killing Sergeant Steven Robin. She and Officer Branden Estorffe then shot at each other, with both being fatally shot. Anderson's child was not physically harmed.
2022-12-13	Mark McKinley Stanton (65)	White	Savannah, GA	
2022-12-13	Bradly Locklin (27)	Unknown	Waterford, California	
2022-12-12	Sean Hinton (42)	White	Powell, Ohio	
2022-12-12	Joshua Leon Wright (36)	Black	Kyle, Texas	A correctional officer shot an inmate, Wright, at a hospital after he allegedly assaulted the officer and fled. Few details were released, but Wright had been in jail for charges of unauthorized use of a motor vehicle, bail jumping, failure to appear, reckless driving, criminal mischief and evading arrest.
2022-12-12	Unknown (60)	Unknown	Orange City, Florida	A police vehicle struck a woman crossing a road outside a crosswalk.
2022-12-10	Isaiah Winkley (21)	White	Kiln, Mississippi	Police responded to reports of a burglary and shot Winkley. Few details were released.
2022-12-10	Justin Ruddell (41)	White	Brookings, Oregon	Ruddell was unarmed.
2022-12-10	Daniel Coello Villatoro (31)	Latino	Bluffdale, Utah	
2022-12-09	Unnamed man (48)	Unknown	Honolulu, Hawaii	
2022-12-09	Michael Stevens (57)	White	Rockbridge County, Virginia	
2022-12-09	Peter Birmingham (32)	Unknown	Corona, California	
2022-12-09	Morris Sprachman (102)	White	Massapequa, NY	
2022-12-09	Latoris A. Taylor (40)	Black	Memphis, Tennessee	
2022-12-08	Pierre Thompson	Unknown	Lombard, Illinois	
2022-12-08	John Ray Romero (58)	Unknown	San Diego, California	Police responded to reports of a man holding a gun to his head in the City Heights neighborhood. When police approached Romero, he ran, and held what appeared to be a gun to his head and told officers to shoot him, according to police. He then ran, and police shot him with less-lethal beanbags when he allegedly produced the item again. Romero fell, and three officers shot him as he got up with the item, later determined to be a pellet or BB gun, still in hand.
2022-12-08	Randy Goens (61)	White	Fort Collins, Colorado	
2022-12-08	Jose Reza-Navarro (52)	Latino	Baton Rouge, Louisiana	Reza-Navarro was unarmed.
2022-12-08	Justin Morgan (45)	Unknown	Poplar Bluff, Missouri	
2022-12-07	Troy Bullock (28)	Black	Washington, D.C.	An off-duty FBI agent shot a man, Bullock, during a fight at the Metro Center station. Surveillance video showed the two men fighting before falling over a railing, with the agent shooting Bullock about sixteen seconds afterwards. Police stated a gun was found on Bullock.
2022-12-07	Derek Large (34)	White	Homosassa, Florida	
2022-12-07	Mark D. Davenport (48)	White	Maryland Heights, Missouri	
2022-12-07	Jeremy Fowley (47)	White	Carbondale, Illinois	
2022-12-07	Stephen Bentley (34)	Unknown	Hayden, Alabama	
2022-12-07	Kevin J. Wallace (34)	White	Tucson, Arizona	
2022-12-06	Juan Carlos Enriquez Rodriguez (33)	Latino	Sacramento, California	A pickup truck pulled over on the side of the freeway after it ran out of gas. As brothers Juan and Lionel Enriquez Rodriguez worked on putting gas in the vehicle, they were struck by an on-duty police detective driving an unmarked vehicle that had crossed the white line. Both Juan and Lionel died, one at the scene and the other at the hospital. The detective had previously been sued for a separate crash that occurred in April 2021.
2022-12-06	Lionel Enriquez Rodriguez (32)	Latino	Sacramento, California	A pickup truck pulled over on the side of the freeway after it ran out of gas. As brothers Juan and Lionel Enriquez Rodriguez worked on putting gas in the vehicle, they were struck by an on-duty police detective driving an unmarked vehicle that had crossed the white line. Both Juan and Lionel died, one at the scene and the other at the hospital. The detective had previously been sued for a separate crash that occurred in April 2021.
2022-12-06	Dennis Happawana (32)	Unknown	Fresno, California	
2022-12-06	Sherrano Stingley (48)	Black	Sacramento, CA	
2022-12-06	Franco Miguel Anzaldua (24)	Latino	Woodsboro, Texas	
2022-12-05	Tavares Harrington (34)	Black	Raeford, North Carolina	
2022-12-05	Alberto Quintero Gomez (28)	Latino	Seeley, California	
2022-12-05	James West Jr. (39)	White	Memphis, Tennessee	
2022-12-05	Howard Johnson (24)	Black	Saint Paul, Minnesota	In the Dayton's Bluff neighborhood, police responded to a domestic assault allegedly involving Johnson and they set up a perimeter to apprehend him. A video surveillance camera captured Johnson attempt a carjacking of an uninvolved vehicle while displaying a gun. Police drove up to him and struck him with a squad car, knocking him to the ground. Johnson got up as an officer exited the police car and the two exchanged gunshots. Johnson was struck multiple times. He was transported to a hospital and later died.
2022-12-04	Daniel Rivera (39)	Latino	The Bronx, New York	
2022-12-04	Mark Limon (18)	Latino	Amado, Arizona	
2022-12-04	Steven Garcia (56)	Unknown	Tucson, Arizona	
2022-12-03	Austin Walsh (23)	White	Palm Bay, Florida	An off-duty Brevard County Sheriff's deputy and Walsh, his roommate and a fellow deputy, were standing and talking after taking a break from playing an online game with friends. According to the deputy, he jokingly pointed a gun at Walsh, wrongly believing it was unloaded, and pulled the trigger, shooting Walsh. The deputy was arrested by Florida Department of Law Enforcement agents and charged with manslaughter.
2022-12-03	Tiyzair Ahmad Huddleston (22)	Black	Norcross, Georgia	Police responded to a suspicious person call from a security guard. Police found the man and shot him after he allegedly ran towards them with a knife.
2022-12-03	Jerome Flanigan (51)	White	Johnson City, Tennessee	
2022-12-02	Ronald Wayne Green (45)	White	Rockwell, North Carolina	
2022-12-02	Donald Hodges (57)	White	Ridgeway, Virginia	
2022-12-02	Jonathan Wiseman (39)	White	New Castle County, Delaware	
2022-12-01	James Ready (42)	White	Terre Haute, Indiana	
2022-12-01	Deshawn Whitaker (28)	Black	Virginia Beach, Virginia	
2022-12-01	Benjamin Remley (36)	White	Daytona Beach, Florida	
2022-12-01	Dylan Walstrom (28)	White	Topeka, Kansas	
2022-12-01	Jesse Garcia (38)	Unknown	Tulare, California	

== See also ==
- Death in custody § United States
- Henry A. Wallace Police Crime Public Database
- List of cases of police brutality
- List of countries with annual rates and counts for killings by law enforcement officers
- List of law enforcement officers killed in the line of duty in the United States
- List of law enforcement officers convicted for an on-duty killing in the United States
- List of shootings by US immigration agents
- List of police reforms related to the George Floyd protests
- List of unarmed African Americans killed by law enforcement officers in the United States
- Lists of killings by law enforcement officers
- Police brutality in the United States
- Police misconduct § United States
- Police riot § United States
- Police use of deadly force in the United States
