= Dan Rasmussen =

American politician (born 1947)

Daniel J. Rasmussen
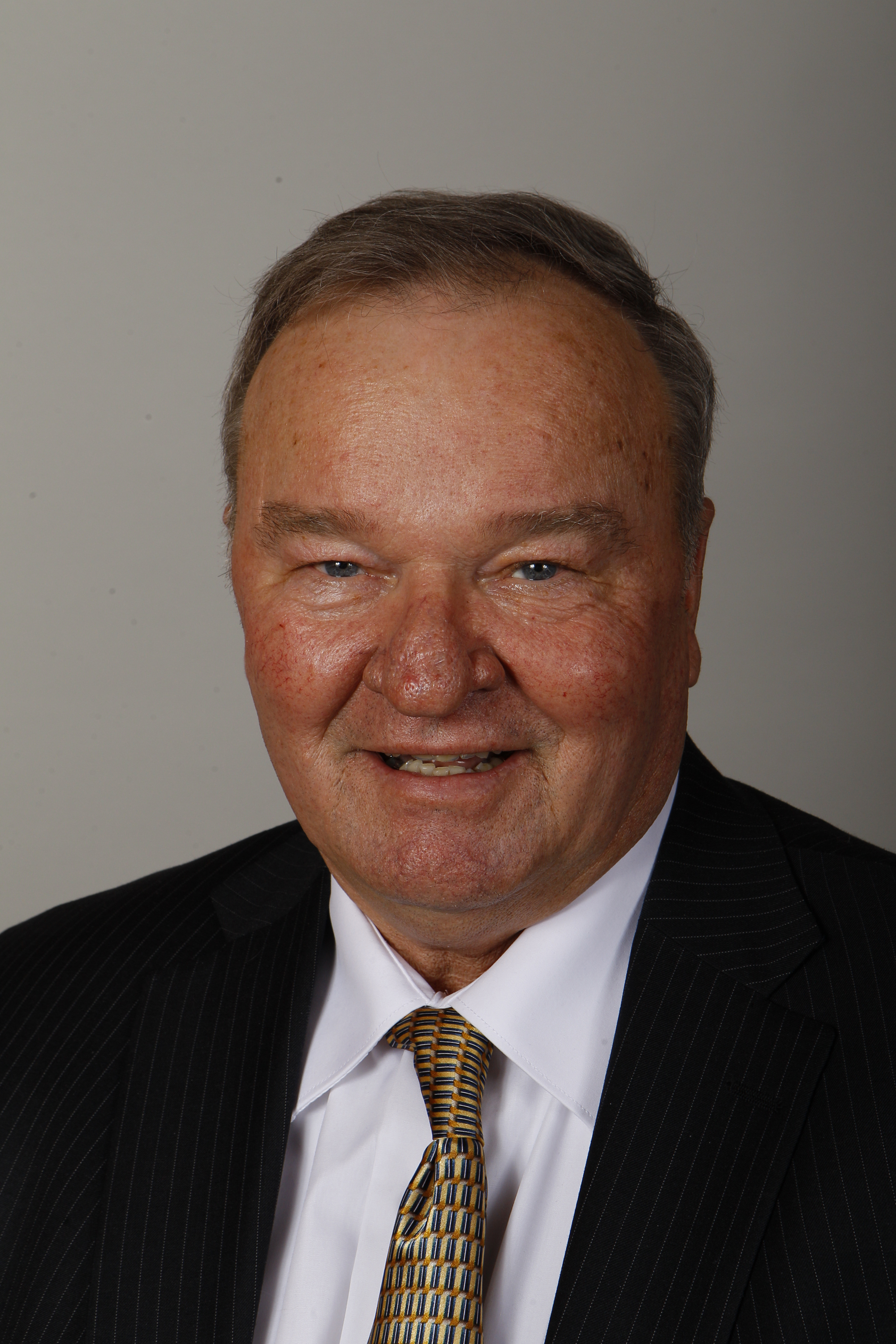

Member of the Iowa House of Representatives from the 23rd district
- Incumbent
- Assumed office January 10, 2011
- Preceded by: Gene Ficken

Member of the Iowa House of Representatives from the 23rd district
- In office January 13, 2003 – January 11, 2009
- Preceded by: William Witt
- Succeeded by: Gene Ficken

Personal details
- Born: August 12, 1947 (age 79) Independence, Iowa, U.S.
- Party: Republican
- Education: Iowa State University
- Occupation: Executive Director, ILICA
- Website: Rasmussen's website

Daniel Judd Rasmussen (born August 12, 1947) is the Iowa State Representative from the 23rd District since 2011. A Republican, he had previously served in the Iowa House of Representatives from 2003 to 2009. He received his BS from Iowa State University. He is the Executive Director for the Iowa Chapter of Land Improvement Contractors of America (ILICA).

As of October 2011, Rasmussen serves on several committees in the Iowa House - the Agriculture, Economic Growth/Rebuild Iowa, Natural Resources, and Transportation committees. His prior political experience included serving on the Independence School Board.

== Electoral history ==
Rasmussen first ran for election to the Iowa House in 2000, losing the election to the 28th District's incumbent Democrat, Steve Falck. The legislative districts were redrawn for the 2002 election, and Rasmussen defeated Democratic opponent Jeanette Randall in the race for the 23rd District. Rasmussen won re-election biennially until 2008, when he lost to Democrat Gene Ficken. In 2010, Rasmussen won the seat back in a re-match with Ficken.

*incumbent

Election	Political result	Candidate	Party	Votes	%
Iowa House of Representatives elections, 2000; District 28; Turnout: 11,619	Democratic hold	Steve Falck*	Democratic	7,927	68.2
Iowa House of Representatives elections, 2000; District 28; Turnout: 11,619	Democratic hold	Daniel J. Rasmussen	Republican	3,692	31.8
Iowa House of Representatives elections, 2002; District 23; Turnout: 10,065	Republican (newly redistricted)	Dan Rasmussen	Republican	5,180	51.5
Iowa House of Representatives elections, 2002; District 23; Turnout: 10,065	Republican (newly redistricted)	Jeanette Randall	Democratic	4,879	48.5
Iowa House of Representatives elections, 2004; District 23; Turnout: 14,359	Republican hold	Dan Rasmussen*	Republican	7,808	54.4
Iowa House of Representatives elections, 2004; District 23; Turnout: 14,359	Republican hold	Ron C. Miller	Democratic	6,543	45.6
Iowa House of Representatives elections, 2006; District 23; Turnout: 11,131	Republican hold	Dan Rasmussen*	Republican	5,716	51.4
Iowa House of Representatives elections, 2006; District 23; Turnout: 11,131	Republican hold	Pete McRoberts	Democratic	5,217	46.9
Iowa House of Representatives elections, 2008; District 23; Turnout: 14,286	Democratic gain from Republican	Gene Ficken	Democratic	7,520	52.6
Iowa House of Representatives elections, 2008; District 23; Turnout: 14,286	Democratic gain from Republican	Dan Rasmussen*	Republican	6,761	47.3
Iowa House of Representatives elections, 2010; District 23; Turnout: 11,206	Republican gain from Democratic	Dan Rasmussen	Republican	5,596	49.9
Iowa House of Representatives elections, 2010; District 23; Turnout: 11,206	Republican gain from Democratic	Gene Ficken*	Democratic	5,388	48.1

Iowa House of Representatives
Preceded by William Witt	23rd District; 2003 – 2009	Succeeded by Gene Ficken
Preceded by Gene Ficken	23rd District; 2011 – present	Succeeded by Incumbent
