= Glen Bortell =

American politician (1914–2015)

Member of the Iowa House of Representatives from the 58th district
- In office January 8, 1973 – January 9, 1977
- Preceded by: Norman Jesse
- Succeeded by: Philip Davitt

Member of the Iowa Senate from the 12th district
- In office December 16, 1969 – January 10, 1971
- Preceded by: Joseph Flatt
- Succeeded by: Alden Erskine

Personal details
- Born: September 9, 1914 Grinnell, Iowa
- Died: April 18, 2015 (aged 100) Inverness, Florida
- Party: Republican

Glen E. Bortell (September 9, 1914 – April 18, 2015) was an American politician who served in the Iowa Senate from the 12th district from 1969 to 1971 and in the Iowa House of Representatives from the 58th district from 1973 to 1977.

He died on April 18, 2015, in Inverness, Florida, at age 100.
