= Bob Hager =

Bob Hager may refer to:

- Robert Hager, analyst and former correspondent for the US television network NBC News
- Bob Hager (politician) (1961–2025), American politician, member of the Iowa House of Representatives
- Bob Hager (coach), head coach of varsity men's basketball at Oregon Agricultural College, today's Oregon State University, until the 1928–29 season
