= Eric Armstrong =

American politician and retired railroad executive

Representative-elect of the Iowa House of Representatives for the 20th district
- Assuming office January 11, 2027
- Succeeding: Josh Turek

Personal details
- Born: Burlington, Iowa, U.S.
- Party: Democratic
- Spouse: Hillary Parker
- Occupation: Railroad executive
- Website: Official website

Eric Armstrong is an American politician and retired railroad executive. He ran in the 2026 Iowa House of Representatives election in the 20th district as a Democrat before suspending his election campaign on September 7 to focus on his health, leading most Iowa Democrats to expect his defeat. In the November election, he defeated Republican nominee Keith Jones by ten points and will succeed Josh Turek, who won the 2026 U.S. Senate election in Iowa. In an interview with The New York Times after his victory, Armstrong said he would do his best to serve while dealing with his health issues. Armstrong, an ally of Turek who had previously worked with him on legislation, ran for the seat with Turek's encouragement.

His state house district represents Carter Lake and parts of Council Bluffs in Pottawattamie County.

== Early and personal life ==
Eric Armstrong was born and raised in Burlington, Iowa. He attended Southeastern Community College in Iowa. During his career, worked as a commercial salesman, as a railroad executive, and as an entrepreneur. He is married to Hillary Parker, a mechanical engineer originally from New York who has served in executive roles at Union Pacific Railroad. They have lived in Carter Lake, Iowa, for over 25 years as of 2026. They have two sons, who are both married with daughters of their own. Armstrong retired in the early-2020s.

Carter Lake is represented as part of Iowa's 20th House of Representatives district, which was held by Democrat Josh Turek during the 91st session of the Iowa House. During that session, Armstrong worked with Turek on a bill to change Iowa's laws on canopy materials for docks, with Iowa's laws on it being stricter than neighboring Nebraska in that they prohibited hard roofs. Armstrong traveled to Des Moines, Iowa's capital, 25 times to lobby lawmakers. He testified during a subcommittee hearing that softer enclosure materials are less stable and more vulnerable to storms. Parker was also active in lobbying for the bill and recalled in an interview that they baked hundreds of cookies and gave them to members, writing their bill's number on each cookie. The bill, Iowa House File 710, passed unanimously in the Iowa House of Representatives, passed the Iowa Senate, was signed into law by Governor Kim Reynolds on May 6, 2025, and took effect on July 1, 2025. Armstrong also worked with Turek on other bills and volunteered for his campaign.

== 2026 election ==
Turek did not seek reelection to the Iowa House of Representatives in 2026, instead launching a bid for the U.S. Senate. He encouraged Armstrong to run for his seat in the 2026 Iowa House of Representatives election during a Labor Day picnic in 2025. The 20th district is mostly suburban and encompasses Carter Lake and parts of Council Bluffs, both in Pottawattamie County. Armstrong later cited his work with Turek on the docking bill as an influence on his decision to run. He announced his candidacy in November 2025. He launched his campaign in February 2026, with an event at a bar and grill where he was introduced by Turek. After advancing from the primary election unopposed, Armstrong faced the Republican nominee Keith Jones, a retired police lieutenant and appointed member of the Pottawattamie County Board of Supervisors.

Armstrong campaigned on economic development in western Iowa and the issues of education and affordability. He received union backing from the Iowa AFL-CIO and Iowa State Education Association. He supported reproductive choice, incremental increases to the minimum wage, expanding access to pre-K, increased funding for public schools and the phasing out of private school vouchers, and attracting the development of grocery stores in the 20th district to overcome the issue of food deserts and create jobs not dependent on the Omaha metropolitan area. He attributes his political engagement and marketing strategy to his grandmother, who actively knocked on doors and distributed flyers for political candidates in his early 20s.

On September 7, 2026, Armstrong announced the suspension of his campaign, citing personal health issues. Iowa law provides a way for vacancies to be filled when a candidate withdraws from the race, but because of the timing of his announcement Armstrong remained on the ballot. Armstrong and most Iowa Democrats concluded that he would be defeated. In the 2026 midterms, the Democratic Party won a series of victories in Iowa and across the United States, leading to the election being called a "blue wave" or "blue tsunami". Turek was elected to the U.S. Senate, the first Democrat elected since 2008, Rob Sand was elected governor, and Democrats flipped three of Iowa's four congressional districts, won several other statewide offices, and gained seats in both houses of the legislature. Armstrong won 55.19% of the vote, defeating Jones and his 44.81%.

Bayliss Wagner of The New York Times called his victory an "illustration of the force of the blue wave that hit Iowa", and Max Kendix of The Times wrote that he had been "swept up in a remarkable blue wave". Democratic representative Sean Bagniewski attributed his victory to goodwill built by knocking on 17,000 doors before suspending his campaign, Republican representative Brent Siegrist attributed it to Turek's strong performance, and Jones said that Armstrong had done lots of work during the campaign before dropping out. In an interview with The New York Times, Armstrong said he would "do [his] best to represent" the district even with his health issues. In a Facebook post two days after the election, he thanked his supporters and said that voters had "sent a clear message about the direction they want for Iowa", also pledging to be transparent about his future. The Iowa House of Representatives will start their 2027–29 session on January 11, 2027.
