= Andy McKean =

American politician (born 1949)

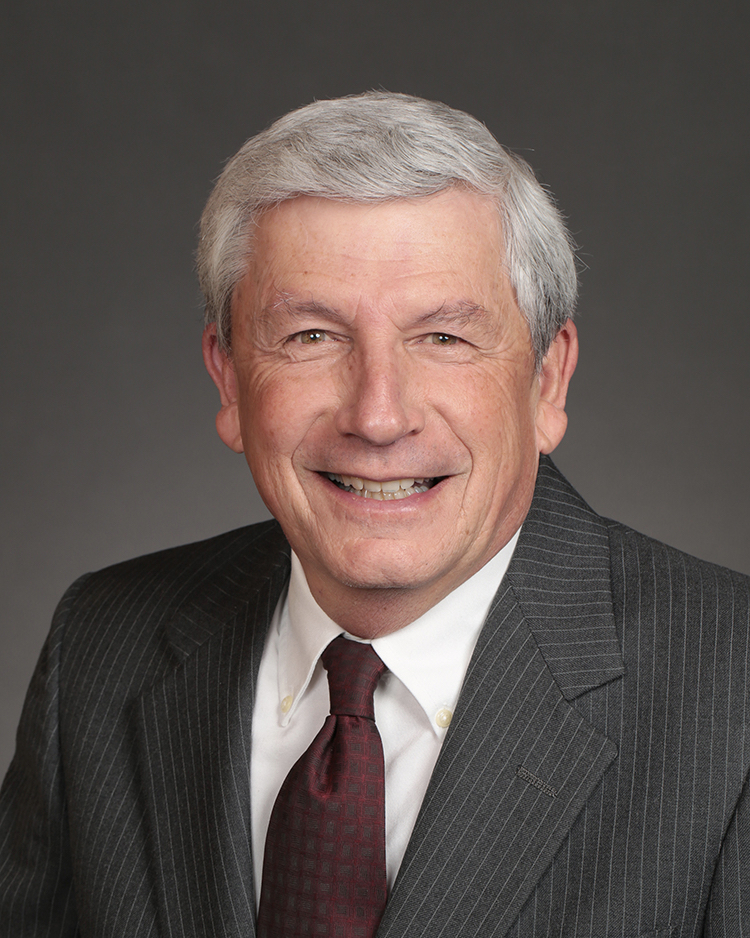

Member of the Iowa House of Representatives from the 58th district
- In office January 9, 2017 – January 10, 2021
- Preceded by: Brian Moore
- Succeeded by: Steven Bradley

Member of the Iowa Senate from the 28th district
- In office January 11, 1993 – January 12, 2003
- Preceded by: Richard Drake
- Succeeded by: James Seymour

Member of the Iowa House of Representatives from the 44th district
- In office January 10, 1983 – January 11, 1993
- Preceded by: Joyce Lonergan
- Succeeded by: Robert C. Arnould

Member of the Iowa House of Representatives from the 23rd district
- In office January 8, 1979 – January 10, 1983
- Preceded by: Scott Newhard
- Succeeded by: Marv Diemer

Personal details
- Born: Andrew John McKean; June 23, 1949 (age 77) New York, New York, U.S.
- Party: Democratic (2019–present)
- Other political affiliations: Republican (1978–2019)
- Spouse: Constance Hoefer (m. 1983)
- Education: Drake University; SUNY Oneonta; University of Rhode Island; University of Iowa
- Occupation: lawyer, businessman

Andrew John McKean (born June 23, 1949) is an American politician and retired attorney in the state of Iowa. He represented various districts in the Iowa House of Representatives, including District 23 from 1979 to 1983 and District 44 from 1983 to 1993. Afterward, he served in the Iowa Senate, representing District 28 from 1993 to 2003. He served as a supervisor of Jones County from 2003 to 2011. McKean returned to the Iowa House in 2016 after being elected to District 58, defeating Jessica Kean. In 2018, he was reelected, defeating Joe Oclon. On August 21, 2019, Republican Steven Bradley of Cascade, Iowa, announced that he would run against McKean after he chose to run as a Democrat. In the 2020 elections, Bradley defeated McKean.

McKean was a Republican from 1978 to 2019 and the longest-serving Republican in the Iowa state legislature. On April 23, 2019, he left the Republican Party, citing Donald Trump's influence on the party as his main reason.

== Early life and education ==
McKean was raised in New York state. He earned a bachelor's degree in political science from Oneonta State College and a master's degree in community planning from the University of Rhode Island. He moved to Iowa to explore his family roots in Anamosa and earned a Juris Doctor from the University of Iowa College of Law.

== Political career ==
In his nine terms in the Iowa House of Representatives and three terms in the Iowa Senate, McKean has had several leadership positions, including Senate President Pro Tem and Judiciary Committee Chair. He served as the House Ethics Committee Chair in the 88th General Assembly. From 1979 to 2003, McKean served in both the Iowa House and Senate. McKean served as a Jones County Supervisor from 2003 to 2011 and was appointed to the Iowa Public Information Board by Governor Terry Branstad. As an attorney, he served for Morley, Martelle, and Mechanicsville.

In 2016, McKean was elected to the Iowa House from District 58, defeating Jessica Kean. During that year, McKean accepted $111,954 from the Iowa GOP. He was reelected in 2018 with 5,752 votes (69%) to Joe Oclon's 2,567 (31%).

=== 2019 switch from Republican to Democrat ===
McKean was the longest-serving Republican in the Iowa state legislature. In 2019, he changed political parties and joined the Iowa House Democratic Caucus, citing Donald Trump's "poor example for the nation" as the main reason for his switch. Democratic representatives Todd Prichard and Karin Derry praised McKean for the decision. McKean has announced that he will run for reelection as a Democrat. After the switch, McKean became the seventh Republican to switch parties since the 2016 presidential election. On August 21, 2019, Republican dentist Steve Bradley of Cascade, Iowa, announced that he would run against McKean.

On June 13, 2019, McKean hosted Montana Governor Steve Bullock at his house. In October 2019, McKean endorsed Democratic presidential primary candidate Amy Klobuchar of Minnesota.

== Political positions ==
McKean believes that health care should be more affordable and Iowa's mental health system should be improved, which would help improve healthcare access. During his 2016 election, he believed that healthcare should be improved with an "emphasis on preventative efforts". He also supports legalizing marijuana for medical use, but not for recreational use, as he considers it a "gateway drug". In 2017, he twice voted to legalize medical marijuana. He voted against establishing a healthcare budget for 2019 and 2020.

McKean has expressed support for any tax reforms that would end loopholes, simplify tax systems, strengthen businesses, and fund state services. In 2018, he pledged to increase Iowa's minimum wage, but said he was concerned that it would end entry jobs and cause small businesses to have a strong "disadvantage with large corporations such as Walmart”.

In 2017, McKean voted for a bill that bans abortion after 20 weeks of pregnancy. But he opposes six-week abortion bans, saying they would “allow undue government intrusion into private family concerns”. He also voted against banning abortions after a heartbeat. In 2020, he supported a 24-hour waiting period on abortions, the lone Democrat in the Iowa House to do so.

McKean expressed support for Iowa's Constitution to protect the "right to bear arms", as well as the Second Amendment, but expressed doubt about telling judges to apply strict scrutiny to gun-related legislation. After the Parkland shooting in Florida, McKean expressed support for enacting gun laws, but questioned whether raising the age to buy guns would be helpful. He also expressed support for a Democratic alternative bill that is similar to the Second Amendment.

== Personal life ==
McKean and his wife, Connie, a native of Dubuque, live in a historic home on the edge of Anamosa, where they operated the Shaw House Bed and Breakfast for many years. Andy often plays piano for local events, at church functions, and in care centers and congregate meal sites. Connie was a three-term member of the Anamosa School Board. They have four children and three grandchildren.

McKean is a retired attorney and a member of the Jones County Bar Association. He attends the First Congregational United Church of Christ and calls square dances with his band, the Scotch Grove Pioneers. His hobbies include gardening and taking care of the couple's property; reading about history, politics, and culture; hiking; and playing music. McKean practiced law in Anamosa for 35 years, retiring in 2015. He taught planning law courses at the University of Iowa's graduate program in Urban and Regional Planning from 1978 to 1992. His grandfather, John McKean, was a judge who served in the Iowa State Senate and represented Jones County.

== See also ==
- List of American politicians who switched parties in office
