= Josh Turek =

American politician and Paralympian (born 1979)

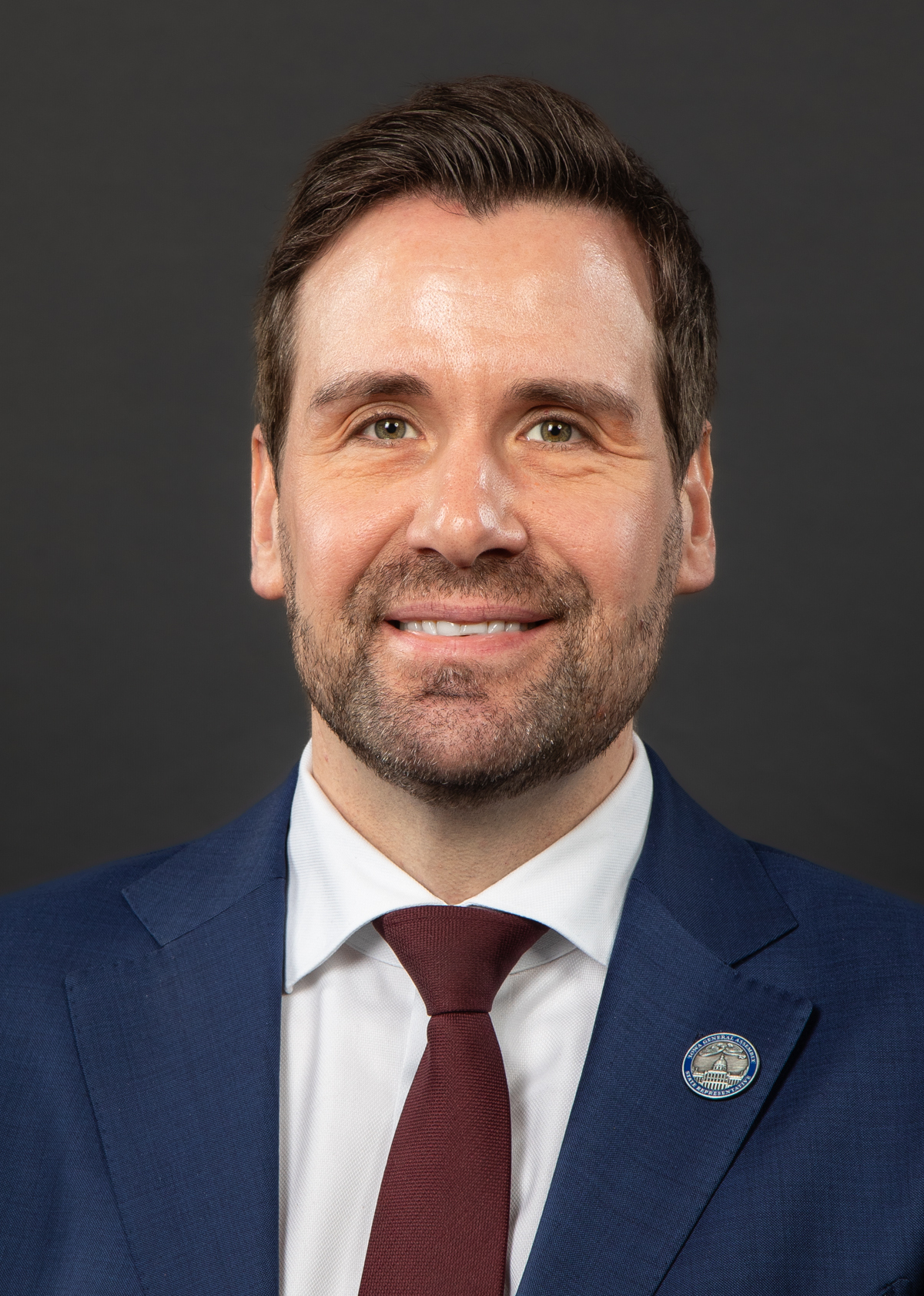
- Official portrait, 2023

United States Senator-elect from Iowa
- Assuming office January 3, 2027
- Succeeding: Joni Ernst

Member of the Iowa House of Representatives from the 20th district
- Incumbent
- Assumed office January 9, 2023
- Preceded by: Ray Sorensen (redistricted)

Personal details
- Born: Joshua Peter Turek; April 12, 1979 (age 47) Council Bluffs, Iowa, U.S.
- Party: Democratic
- Spouse: Jarolin Reyes (m. 2018)
- Relatives: John Turek (brother)
- Education: Southwest Minnesota State University (BA); DeVry University (MBA)
- Website: State House website; Campaign website
- Sports career
- Height: 5 ft 11 in (1.80 m)
- Sport: Wheelchair basketball
- Disability: Spina bifida
- Disability class: 3.5
- Coached by: Ron Lykins
Medal record
Men's wheelchair basketball
Representing the United States
Paralympic Games
Bronze medal – third place	2012 London	Team
Gold medal – first place	2016 Rio de Janeiro	Team
Gold medal – first place	2020 Tokyo	Team
World Championship
Silver medal – second place	2014 Incheon	Team
Parapan American Games
Gold medal – first place	2011 Guadalajara	Team
Gold medal – first place	2015 Toronto	Team
Gold medal – first place	2019 Lima	Team

Joshua Peter Turek (born April 12, 1979) is an American politician and former wheelchair basketball player who is a United States senator-elect from Iowa. He has served since 2023 as a member of the Iowa House of Representatives from the 20th district. A member of the Democratic Party, he was the party's nominee in the 2026 United States Senate election in Iowa, defeating Republican nominee Ashley Hinson.

Born in Council Bluffs, Iowa, Turek played collegiate wheelchair basketball at Southwest Minnesota State University and professionally in Europe for nearly two decades. A four-time Paralympian with the United States men's national wheelchair basketball team, he won a bronze medal at the 2012 Games and consecutive gold medals at the 2016 and 2020 Games.

Turek was first elected to the Iowa House of Representatives in 2022, becoming the Iowa Legislature's first permanently disabled lawmaker, and was reelected in 2024. He has been characterized as a moderate.

== Early life and education ==
Turek was born on April 12, 1979, in Council Bluffs, Iowa. His father, John Turek, served in the United States Navy during the Vietnam War and worked as a vocational school administrator, while his mother, Luellen, was a social worker and community college instructor. After the family's first child, a daughter, drowned in a pool as a toddler, Turek—the couple's third child—grew up with three sisters and a brother.

Born with spina bifida—a condition he has attributed to his father's wartime exposure to Agent Orange—Turek underwent multiple childhood surgeries to improve his mobility and has used a wheelchair his entire life. He began playing wheelchair basketball in seventh grade.

Turek graduated from Abraham Lincoln High School in Council Bluffs, earned a Bachelor of Arts in history from Southwest Minnesota State University in 2002, and later received a Master of Business Administration from DeVry University.

== Athletic career ==
From 1997 to 2002, Turek played wheelchair basketball at Southwest Minnesota State University, where he set school career records with 4,024 points and 1,213 rebounds. A four-time National Wheelchair Basketball Association (NWBA) All-American, he was inducted into the NWBA Hall of Fame in 2023.

After graduating, Turek played professionally in Europe for nearly two decades with clubs in Italy, France, and Spain, including Bidaideak Bilbao BS in the Spanish Wheelchair Basketball League.

Turek competed internationally for the United States men's national wheelchair basketball team under head coach Ron Lykins. Along with winning team gold medals at the 2011, 2015, and 2019 Parapan American Games, he helped the United States qualify for the 2020 Summer Paralympics during the 2019 tournament in Lima by leading the team with 18 points in a 67–36 semifinal victory over Argentina.

Across four Paralympic appearances beginning at the 2004 Games in Athens, Turek won a bronze medal at the 2012 Games in London and consecutive gold medals at the 2016 Games in Rio de Janeiro and the 2020 Games in Tokyo. He also earned a silver medal at the 2014 Wheelchair Basketball World Championships in Incheon.

After retiring from basketball, Turek worked for NuMotion, a mobility equipment provider, fitting patients for wheelchairs and navigating insurance coverage. Frustrated by insurance denials and delays affecting people with disabilities—and learning that Iowa had never elected a permanently physically disabled state legislator—he decided to run for the Iowa House of Representatives.

== Iowa House of Representatives ==
=== Elections ===
In March 2022, Turek announced his candidacy for Iowa's 20th House of Representatives district. In the November 2022 general election, a recount requested by Republican nominee Sarah Abdouch confirmed that Turek won by six votes out of roughly 6,800 cast. He was reelected in 2024, defeating Republican nominee James Wassell with 52.5% of the vote to Wassell's 47.5%. Before Turek was elected, the district had voted Republican in every presidential election since 1968. After Turek decided not to seek reelection to the legislature, the Democratic Party nominated his ally Eric Armstrong, whom Turek had encouraged to run. Armstrong suspended his campaign in September 2026 to focus on his health but was still elected with 55% of the vote in November, defeating Republican nominee Keith Jones.

=== Tenure ===
Turek took office on January 9, 2023, as the Iowa Legislature's first permanently disabled member. He said he intended to focus on disability policy. He spearheaded the bipartisan "Work Without Worry" program, legislation that eliminated Medicaid income limits for employed Iowans with disabilities.

In 2024, Turek introduced a bill to eliminate prescription and in-person physician visit requirements for Medicaid reimbursement of wheelchair repairs, arguing that the rules caused unnecessary delays. The bill stalled in the state senate, but the Iowa Department of Health and Human Services removed the requirements later that year.

In 2026, Turek co-sponsored a right-to-repair bill that passed the Iowa House but did not advance in the state senate.

=== Committee assignments ===
In the Iowa House, Turek serves on the Health and Human Services Committee and the Health Policy Oversight Committee. He previously sat on the Environmental Protection and Natural Resources Committees and served as ranking member of the Veterans Affairs Committee and the Health and Human Services Appropriations Subcommittee.

== U.S. Senate ==
=== Campaign ===
On August 12, 2025, Turek announced his candidacy for the U.S. Senate to succeed retiring Senator Joni Ernst. He faced State Senator Zach Wahls in the Democratic primary; The Des Moines Register wrote, "Turek casts a more moderate image that his supporters believe will appeal to independents and disaffected Republicans." Turek defeated Wahls in the June 2, 2026, primary and advanced to the general election against the Republican nominee, U.S. Representative Ashley Hinson.

Turek was endorsed by former U.S. President Barack Obama, whom Turek called "one of my political heroes ... He won Iowa twice and he's still beloved here. When he ran, he was leaning into hope and positivity and inspiration, which is what I'm trying to do." Obama spokesperson Eric Schultz said, "Obama has an attachment to the state of Iowa, and he found Josh a particularly inspiring leader who seems to be answering the call of service of this moment." Journalist Peter Hamby of Puck wrote that Turek and Iowa Democratic gubernatorial nominee Rob Sand "lay heartland aesthetics over their left-leaning politics".

== Political positions ==
Turek has been described as a moderate and has called himself a "common-sense" moderate and a "prairie populist". In a September 2026 interview with Jon Stewart, Turek advocated an anti-establishment platform for the Democratic Party, saying, "If we're going to once again win in prairie states, it's got to be with an economic populist message, a prairie populist message ... not just being the lesser of two evils—being a corporate Democrat."

=== Healthcare ===
Turek supports creating a public health insurance option and restoring enhanced Affordable Care Act (ACA) subsidies. He opposes cuts to Medicaid and has pledged to reverse Medicaid spending reductions. On reproductive rights, he favors passing federal legislation to codify the abortion protections formerly established under Roe v. Wade and has argued that Iowa's six-week abortion ban reduced the availability of OB-GYN services in the state.

=== Agriculture ===
Turek supports federal right-to-repair legislation requiring agricultural equipment manufacturers to make replacement parts, tools, and diagnostic software available to farmers and independent repair shops. He has called for ending the second Trump administration's tariffs, arguing that they have raised input costs for farmers and curtailed agricultural export markets. Additionally, he supports year-round sales of E15 blended gasoline and mandatory country-of-origin labeling for agricultural products. Turek said he supports passing a farm bill "that is actually good for rural communities and small family farms, not just Big Ag".

=== Artificial intelligence ===
Turek has criticized the concentration of artificial intelligence (AI) technology among a small number of corporations. He supports regulating data centers, opposes tax incentives for their operators, and has called for regulatory safeguards to prevent data centers from driving up residential electricity rates. While expressing concern over AI-related job displacement, he has maintained that the United States should remain competitive with China in the sector.

=== LGBTQ rights ===
In the Iowa House, he opposed legislation requiring schools to notify parents when a student asked for pronouns distinct from those matching their assigned gender, as well as a bill restricting transgender students from using school restrooms and locker rooms aligned with their gender identity, saying it also puts disabled people at risk. In 2025, Turek voted no on a bill removing gender identity protections from the Iowa Civil Rights Act and restricting birth certificate changes for trans people and also voted no on a bill barring Medicaid for gender-affirming surgeries, saying the bill did not address Medicaid wait lists and provider shortages.

During his campaign for the US Senate, Turek said he opposes the use of Medicaid funds for all gender-affirming care regardless of age, as well as gender-affirming surgery for minors and the participation of trans women in women's sports. These comments drew condemnation from other Democratic lawmakers, party leaders and LGBT rights groups. Following his election, Turek reiterated his support for restricting trans women in women’s sports and Medicaid funding for gender-affirming care for people of all ages.

=== Foreign policy ===
On August 18, 2025, during the Gaza war, Turek called for conditions on U.S. aid to Israel, saying: "The response at this point has been disproportionate, and I don't think that taxpayer dollars or United States support should be going toward the hurting or killing of children or civilians or certainly not impeding aid going into these areas."

Turek has also criticized the 2026 Iran war, calling it an "unnecessary war" in July 2026 and citing its strain on domestic fuel and living costs.

== Personal life ==
While playing professional basketball in Spain, Turek met Jarolin Reyes, an immigrant from the Dominican Republic; they married in 2018 and live in Council Bluffs, Iowa. His brother, John, and sister, Elisha, also played professional basketball in Europe.

Party political offices
Preceded by Theresa Greenfield	Democratic nominee for U.S. Senator from Iowa (Class 2); 2026	Most recent
U.S. Senate
Preceded by Joni Ernst	U.S. Senator (Class 2) from Iowa; Taking office 2027; Served alongside: Chuck Grassley	Elect
