= USS Miguel Keith =

US Navy expeditionary mobile base vessel

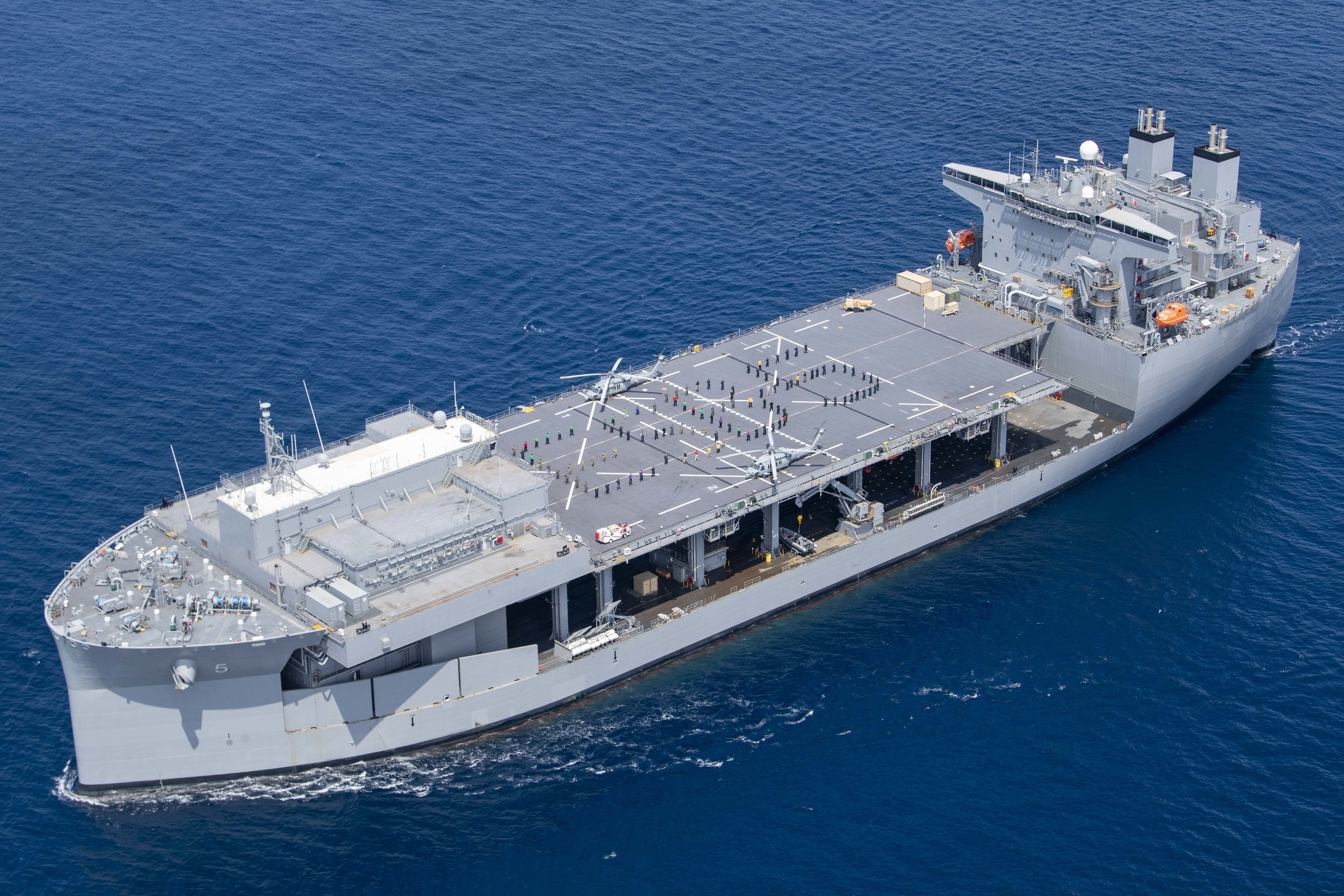

History

United States
- Namesake: Miguel Keith
- Builder: NASSCO – San Diego, California
- Laid down: 30 January 2018
- Launched: 10 August 2018
- Sponsored by: Eliadora Delores Keith
- Christened: 19 October 2019
- Acquired: 15 November 2019
- Commissioned: 8 May 2021
- Identification: IMO number: 9822803; MMSI number: 368926390; Callsign: NMKH
- Motto: Semper in pugna; (Always in the Fight)
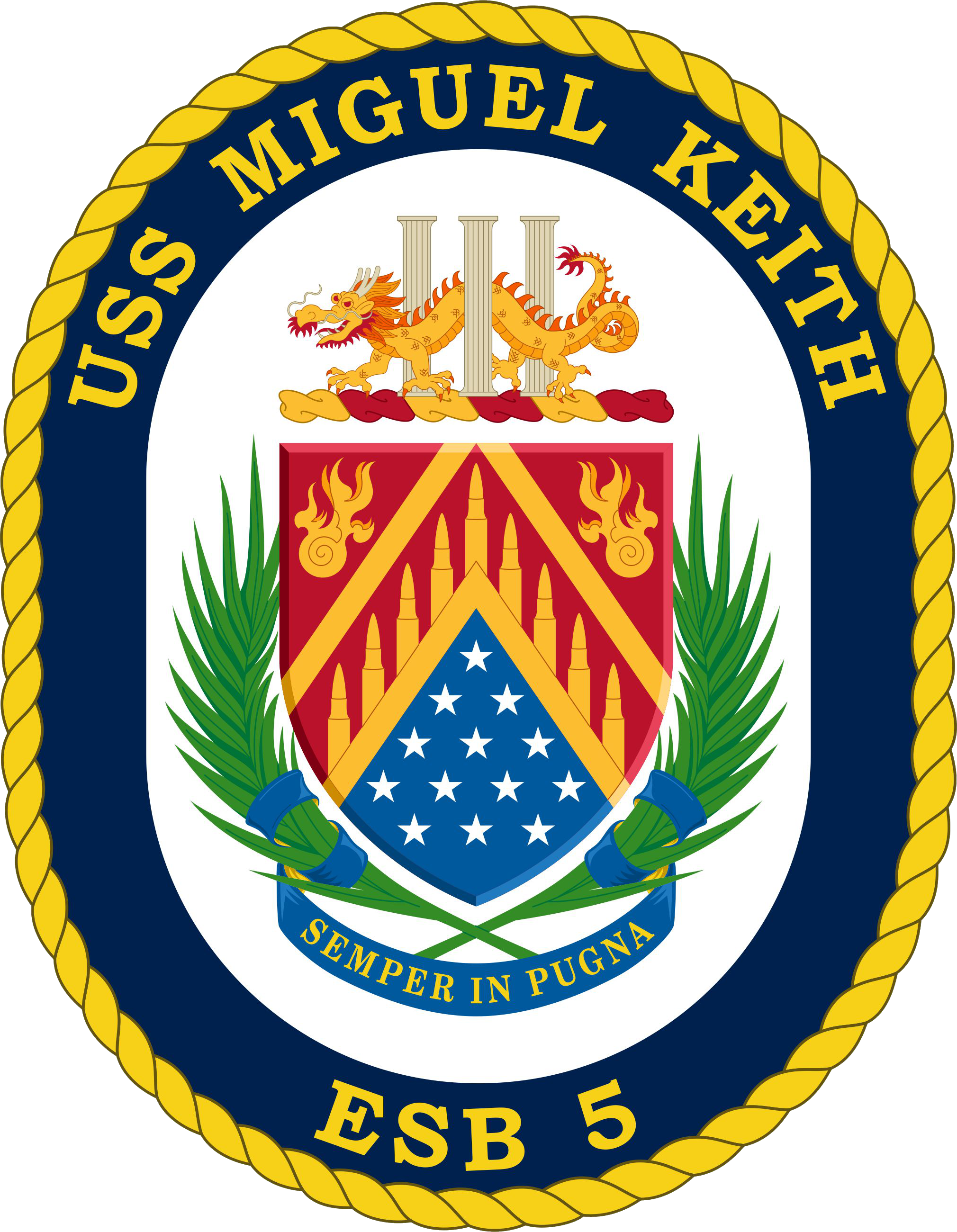
- Badge

General characteristics
- Class & type: Expeditionary Mobile Base
- Displacement: Approx. 90,000 long tons (100,000 short tons) fully loaded
- Length: 785 ft (239 m)
- Beam: 164 ft (50 m)
- Draft: 34.4 ft (10.5 m) @ full load; 39.4 ft (12.0 m) at load line
- Propulsion: Commercial Diesel-Electric
- Speed: 17 knots (31 km/h; 20 mph)
- Range: 9,500 nautical miles (17,600 km; 10,900 mi)
- Complement: 19 officers, 231 enlisted
- Aviation facilities: Four-spot flight deck and hangar

USS Miguel Keith (ESB-5) (formerly USNS Miguel Keith (T-ESB-5)) is a Lewis B. Puller-class expeditionary mobile base, one of three such ships in service with the United States Navy (USN) as of late 2021.

The ship was named in honor of US Marine Corps Lance Corporal Miguel Keith by Secretary of the Navy Richard V. Spencer at the 242nd Marine Corps Birthday Ball held in National Harbor, Maryland, on 5 November 2017. The ship's namesake received the Medal of Honor posthumously for combat action in Quang Ngai Province during the Vietnam War in 1970.

== Origins and concept ==
Miguel Keith was originally a non-commissioned ship, with a USNS prefix but, like her sister ships, she was commissioned by the Navy, in order to provide combatant commanders greater operational flexibility in utilizing the ESBs in accordance with the laws of armed conflict. Additionally, the vessel is particularly well-suited to humanitarian assistance and disaster response.

Miguel Keith had her keel laid on 30 January 2018 and she was delivered to the Navy on 15 November 2019. On 8 May 2021, Miguel Keith was commissioned into Navy service at Naval Air Station North Island. The ship was damaged while under construction when the National Steel and Shipbuilding Company's drydock was accidentally flooded on 11 July 2018.

== Design and equipment ==
The 240-meter vessel is designed to provide a floating helicopter landing base, and provide other support to military operations as an expeditionary sea base. The craft is officially a customizable floating command-and-control base and functionally a staging base, with the ability to launch helicopters and small boats, provide living quarters for troops, and command-and-control facilities. She can accommodate a variety of other facilities in shipping containers, including berthing for special operations troops, laundry facilities, or cold storage.

The ship has a large upper flight deck, or mission deck, suitable for a wide range of applications, including the simultaneous accommodation of four helicopters. Though the ship's deck can land and maintain the largest helicopters, it cannot accommodate F-35B Joint Strike Fighters, despite their short-takeoff and vertical-landing capabilities.

Below is an open space for storing equipment and for launching boats; however, there is no well deck to support the launching and recovery of hovercraft or larger boats. The flight deck separates forward and aft deckhouses. The forward deckhouse is home to a crew of 100 Navy personnel, rotated on a five-month cycle. Engineering and navigation are provided by about 40 civilian mariners berthed in the aft deckhouse.

== Deployment and operations ==
On her maiden deployment to the US 7th Fleet based in Japan, the ship left Hawaii on 20 September 2020, and arrived on 8 October 2021, anchoring off the Japanese coast near Nagasaki, Japan, at the US Naval base at Sasebo. Officially there to enhance capabilities to protect an open and free Indo-Pacific region, the arrival was suspected of being a US response to a growing Chinese military presence in the region.

In October 2021, the ship was damaged by an underwater volcanic eruption. Pumice and other debris entered engineering systems requiring the engines to be shut down for intensive at-sea remediation.
