= Steve Bradley (politician) =

American politician

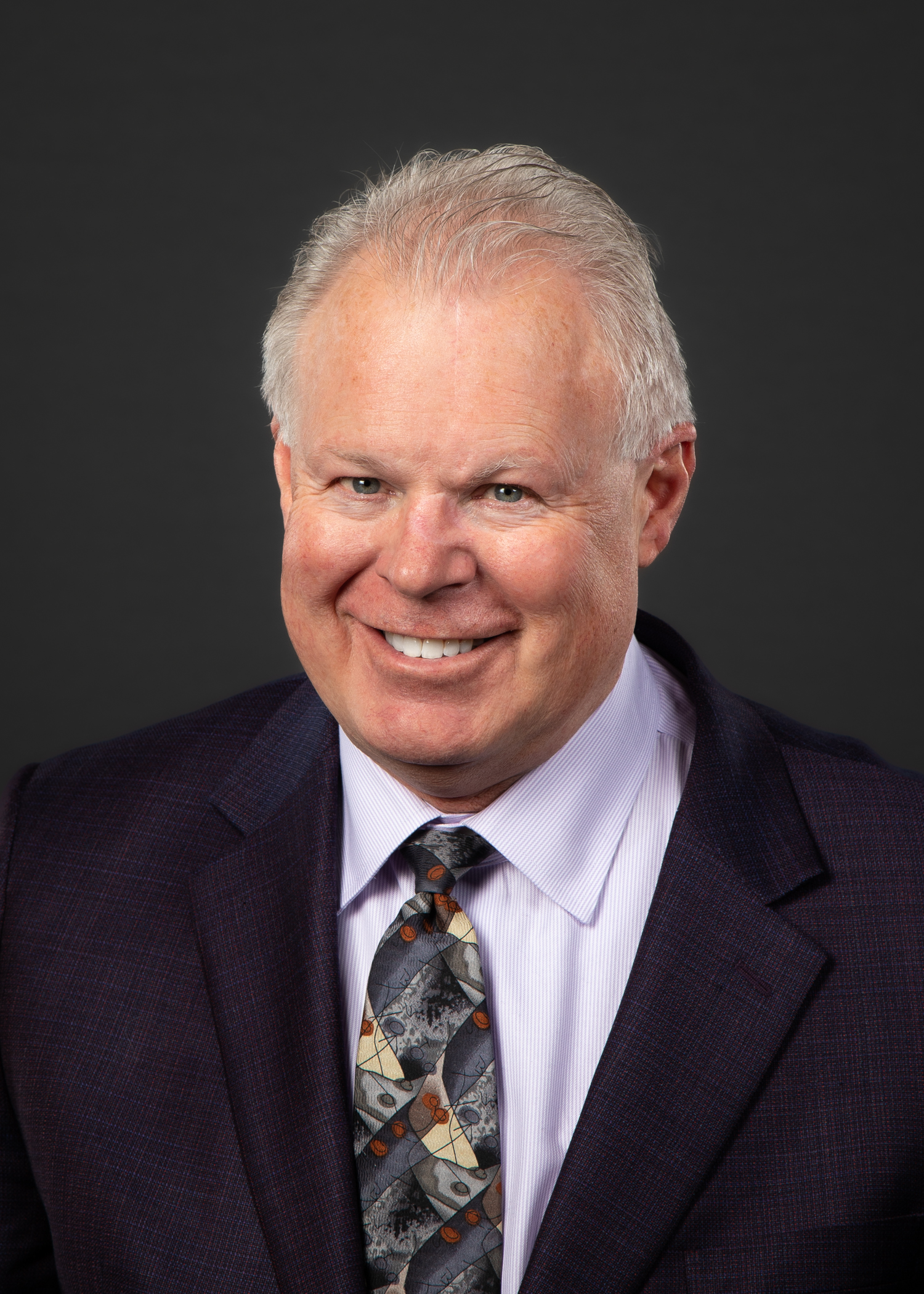

Member of the Iowa House of Representatives from the 58th district
- Incumbent
- Assumed office January 11, 2021
- Preceded by: Andy McKean

Personal details
- Born: Steven P. Bradley Napa, California, U.S.
- Party: Republican
- Education: University of Iowa (BS); Marquette University (DDS)

Dr. Steven P. Bradley is an American politician serving as a member of the Iowa House of Representatives from the 66th district. Elected in November 2020, he assumed office on January 11, 2021.

== Early life and education ==
Bradley was born in Napa, California while his father was serving in the United States Air Force. He later lived in Epworth, Iowa. After graduating from Western Dubuque High School, Bradley attended Loras College and the University of Dubuque before earning a bachelor's degree from the University of Iowa. He earned a dental degree from the Marquette University School of Dentistry.

== Career ==
Outside of politics, Bradley works as a dentist. He was elected to the Iowa House of Representatives in November 2020 and assumed office on January 11, 2021. Bradley also serves as vice chair of the House Human Resources Committee.

Iowa House of Representatives
| Preceded by Art Staed | 66th District; 2023 – present | Succeeded by Incumbent |
| Preceded by Andy McKean | 58th District; 2021 – 2023 | Succeeded by Charley Thomson |
