= Charley Thomson =

American politician (born 1960)

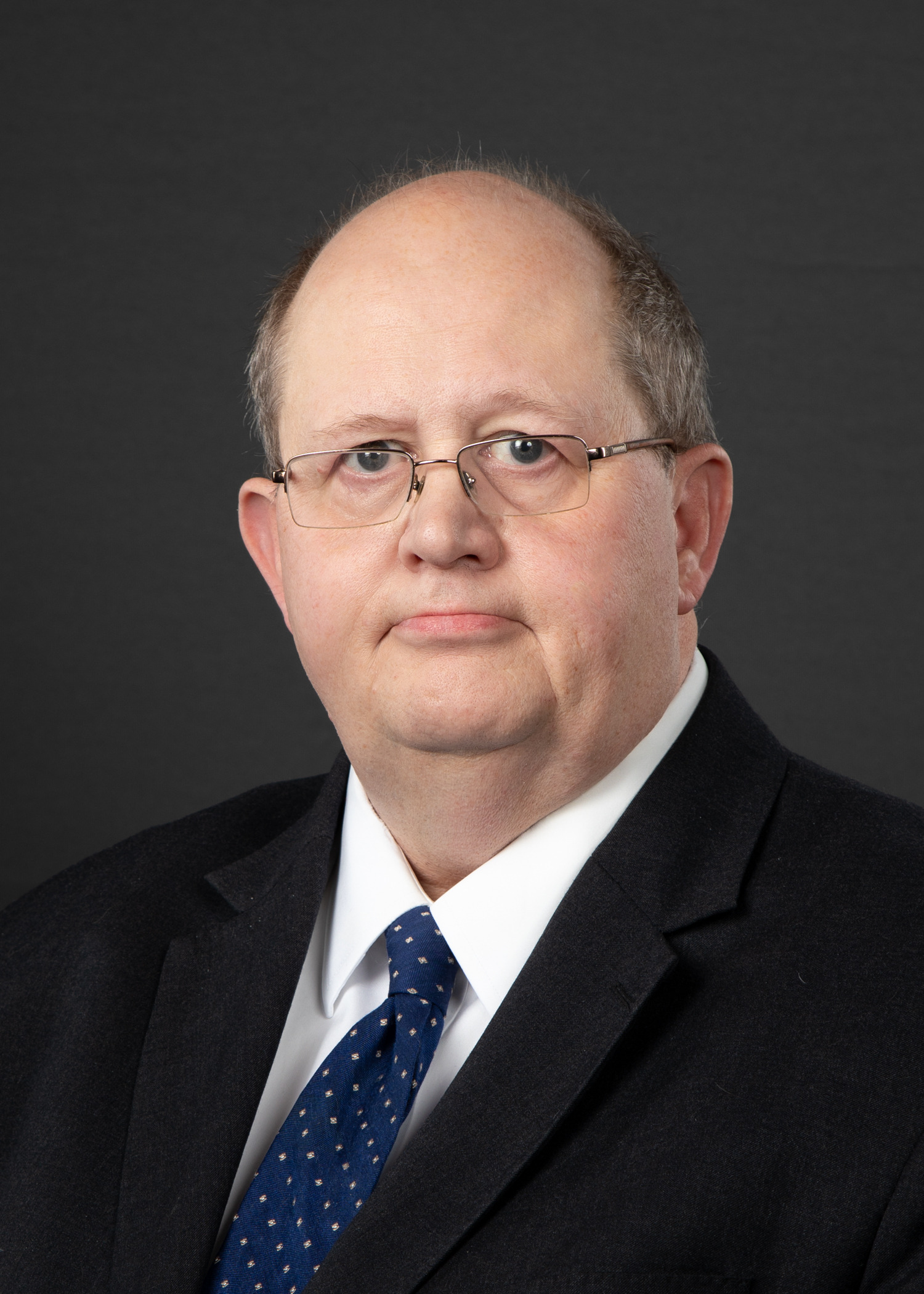

Member of the Iowa House of Representatives from the 58th district
- Incumbent
- Assumed office January 9, 2023
- Preceded by: Steve Bradley

Personal details
- Born: 1960 (age 65–66) Charles City, Iowa, U.S.
- Party: Republican
- Education: University of Michigan; University of Iowa
- Occupation: attorney

Charles M. Thomson (born 1960) is an American politician. Born in Charles City, Iowa, in 1960, he graduated from Charles City Community High School in 1978, earned a Bachelor of Arts degree from the University of Michigan in 1983, then obtained a Juris Doctor from the University of Iowa College of Law in 1987. Thomson practiced law, and lived in Charles City and Chicago. He was the lead developer of the McQuillen Place apartments in his hometown.

Thomson first ran for political office in 2020, losing to Craig Clark in the Republican Party primary for District 52 of the Iowa House of Representatives. He finished ahead of Jim Wright and Sean Galleger in the 2022 primary for House District 58, and defeated Democratic Party candidate Dene Lundberg in the general election. In the 2024 general election, Thomson defeated Gail Allison.

== Committee assignments ==
As of January 2025, Thomson serves on the following committees in the Iowa House:

- Government Oversight (chair)
- Commerce
- Judiciary
- Public Safety
- Federal and Other Funds Appropriations Subcommittee
- Public Retirement Systems Committee
- State Government Efficiency Review Committee
