= David Sieck =

American farmer and politician

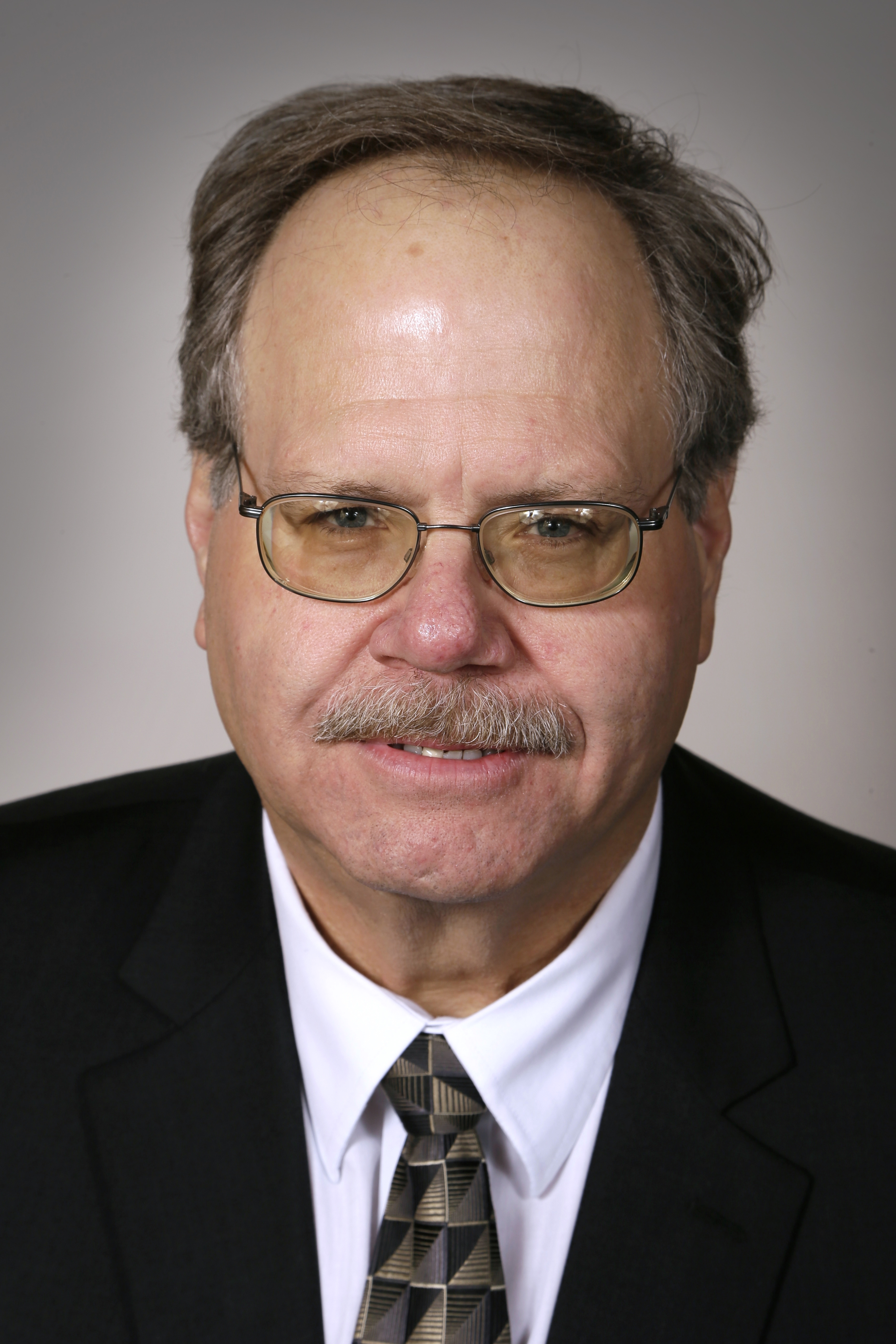
- 86th General Assembly portrait (2015)

Member of the Iowa House of Representatives from the 16th district
- Incumbent
- Assumed office February 16, 2015
- Preceded by: Mark Costello

Personal details
- Born: June 27, 1957 (age 69) Council Bluffs, Iowa, U.S.
- Party: Republican
- Spouse: Kim
- Children: 3
- Profession: Farmer, real estate agent
- Website: legis.iowa.gov/...

David Sieck (born June 27, 1957) is a member of the Iowa House of Representatives. Sieck, a farmer and Republican from Glenwood, Iowa, won a special election in February 2015 to fill the seat being vacated by Mark Costello, who was elected to the Iowa Senate to fill the seat formerly held by Joni Ernst. Sieck was born and raised in Council Bluffs, Iowa.

Iowa House of Representatives
Preceded by Brent Siegrist	16th District; 2023 – present	Succeeded by Incumbent
Preceded by Mark Costello	23rd District; 2015 – 2023	Succeeded by Ray Sorensen
