= Miguel Keith =

United States Marine Corps Medal of Honor recipient

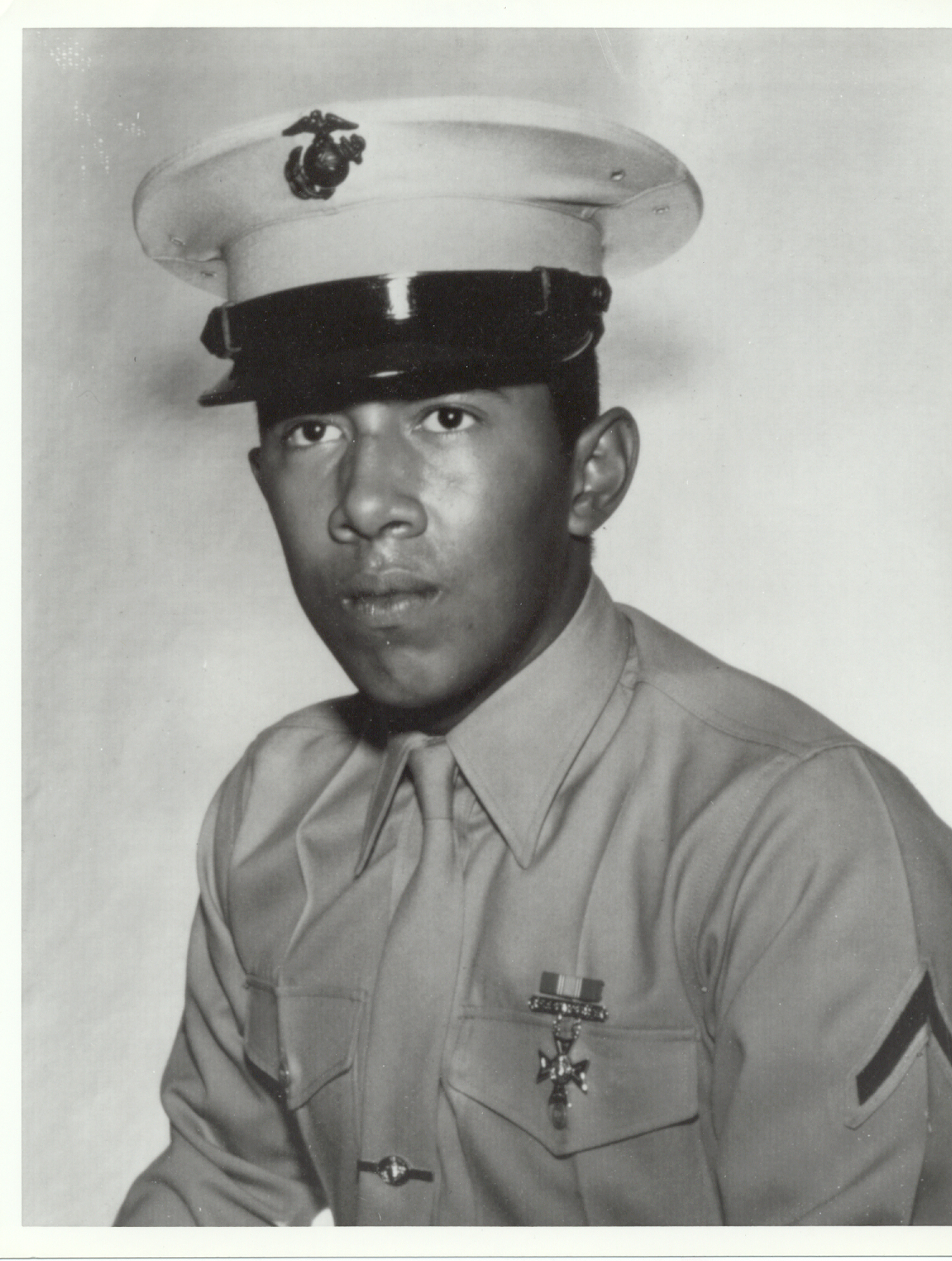
- Miguel Keith, posthumous Medal of Honor recipient
- Born: June 2, 1951; San Antonio, Texas, U.S.
- Died: May 8, 1970 (aged 18); Quảng Ngãi Province, South Vietnam
- Burial place: Forest Lawn Cemetery, Omaha, Nebraska
- Military career
- Allegiance: United States of America
- Branch: United States Marine Corps
- Service years: 1969–1970
- Rank: Lance Corporal
- Units: 1st Combined Action Group, III Marine Expeditionary Force
- Conflicts: Vietnam War †
- Awards: Medal of Honor; Purple Heart

Miguel Keith (June 2, 1951 – May 8, 1970) was a United States Marine who posthumously received the United States's highest military decoration, the Medal of Honor, for heroism in Vietnam in May 1970. Despite being severely wounded, he advanced on enemy attackers, allowing his platoon to rout the attack of a numerically superior enemy force.

== Early years ==
Miguel Keith, a Mexican-American, was born on June 2, 1951, in San Antonio, Texas. He left North High School in Omaha, Nebraska in December 1968, and enlisted in the U.S. Marine Corps Reserve at Omaha on January 21, 1969. He was discharged from the Reserves on April 30, 1969, and the following day, on May 1, 1969, he enlisted in the regular Marine Corps.

Ordered to Marine Corps Recruit Depot San Diego, California, on May 2, 1969, for recruit training, he completed training with the 1st Recruit Training Battalion on July 17, 1969. He was transferred to the Marine Corps Base, Camp Pendleton, California, for individual combat training with Company B, 1st Battalion, 2nd Infantry Training Regiment. On August 1, 1969, he was promoted to the rank of Private First Class.

Upon completion of individual combat training on September 18, 1969, he received orders to the Far East. On November 6, 1969, he arrived in the Republic of Vietnam and was assigned as a rifleman with the 1st Combined Action Group, III Marine Amphibious Force. On April 1, 1970, he was promoted to the rank of Lance Corporal.

While participating in combat in Quảng Ngãi Province on May 8, 1970, he was mortally wounded in the action for which he received the Medal of Honor. When his platoon was under heavy attack from a numerically superior enemy, Keith was seriously wounded. Despite his wounds, he advanced on the enemy with machine gun fire, killing three of the enemy advancing on the command post and dispersing the others. He was severely wounded by a grenade during this charge. In spite of his wounds and loss of blood, he charged a group of 25 attackers, causing them to retreat for cover. He was mortally wounded by enemy fire. His actions contributed significantly to his platoon's success in routing the enemy.

== Medal of Honor citation ==
The President of the United States in the name of The Congress takes pride in presenting the MEDAL OF HONOR posthumously to

LANCE CORPORAL MIGUEL KEITH
UNITED STATES MARINE CORPS

for service as set forth in the following CITATION:

For conspicuous gallantry and intrepidity at the risk of his life above and beyond the call of duty while serving as a machine gunner with Combined Action Platoon 1-3-2, III Marine Amphibious Force, operating in Quang Ngai Province, Republic of Vietnam. During the early morning of 8 May 1970, Lance Corporal Keith was seriously wounded when his platoon was subjected to a heavy ground attack by a greatly outnumbering enemy force. Despite his painful wounds, he ran across the fire-swept terrain to check the security of vital defensive positions, and then, while completely exposed to view, proceeded to deliver a hail of devastating machine gun fire against the enemy. Determined to stop five of the enemy approaching the command post, he rushed forward, firing as he advanced. He succeeded in disposing of three of the attackers and in dispersing the remaining two. At this point, a grenade detonated near Lance Corporal Keith, knocking him to the ground and inflicting further severe wounds. Fighting pain and weakness from loss of blood, he again braved the concentrated hostile fire to charge an estimated twenty-five enemy soldiers who were massing to attack. The vigor of his assault and his well-placed fire eliminated four of the enemy while the remainder fled for cover. During this valiant effort, he was mortally wounded by an enemy soldier. By his courageous and inspiring performance in the face of almost overwhelming odds, Lance Corporal Keith contributed in large measure to the success of his platoon in routing a numerically superior enemy force, and upheld the finest traditions of the Marine Corps and of the United States Naval Service.

/S/ RICHARD M. NIXON

Lance Corporal Keith was buried in Forest Lawn Cemetery, Omaha, Nebraska.

== Decorations ==
His medals and decorations include: the Medal of Honor, the Purple Heart, the Combat Action Ribbon, the National Defense Service Medal, the Vietnam Service Medal with one bronze star, and the Republic of Vietnam Campaign Medal.

Medal of Honor	Purple Heart	Combat Action Ribbon
National Defense Service Medal	Vietnam Service Medal with 1 bronze star	Vietnam Campaign Medal

== In memory ==
The Wall
Miguel Keith has his name inscribed on the Vietnam Veterans Memorial ("The Wall") on Panel 11W Line 132.

Henderson Hall barracks
Keith Hall, a new barracks at Henderson Hall, Headquarters Marine Corps, Arlington, Virginia was dedicated on March 18, 1983, honoring LCPL Miguel Keith. A bronze plaque in the lobby recounts the heroic actions of LCPL Keith.

US Navy ship
USS Miguel Keith (ESB-5) an Expeditionary Mobile Base (ESB) variant of the Montford Point-class Expeditionary Transfer Dock (ESD), both types of mobile sea bases, has been named in his honor and was commissioned on May 10, 2021.

Miguel Keith Park and Memorial
In 1994 a park in South Omaha was named after him. In 2013, a yellow ribbon sidewalk and monument were installed. The Marine Insignia monument from Omaha's Freedom Park relocated after it was damaged in Missouri River flooding in 2011. In 2019, a life size bronze statue was dedicated at Miguel Keith Park in honor of the Medal of Honor recipient.

== See also ==
- List of Medal of Honor recipients
- List of Medal of Honor recipients for the Vietnam War
- List of Hispanic Medal of Honor recipients
- Hispanics in the United States Marine Corps
