= Ray Sorensen (politician) =

Member of the Iowa House of Representatives

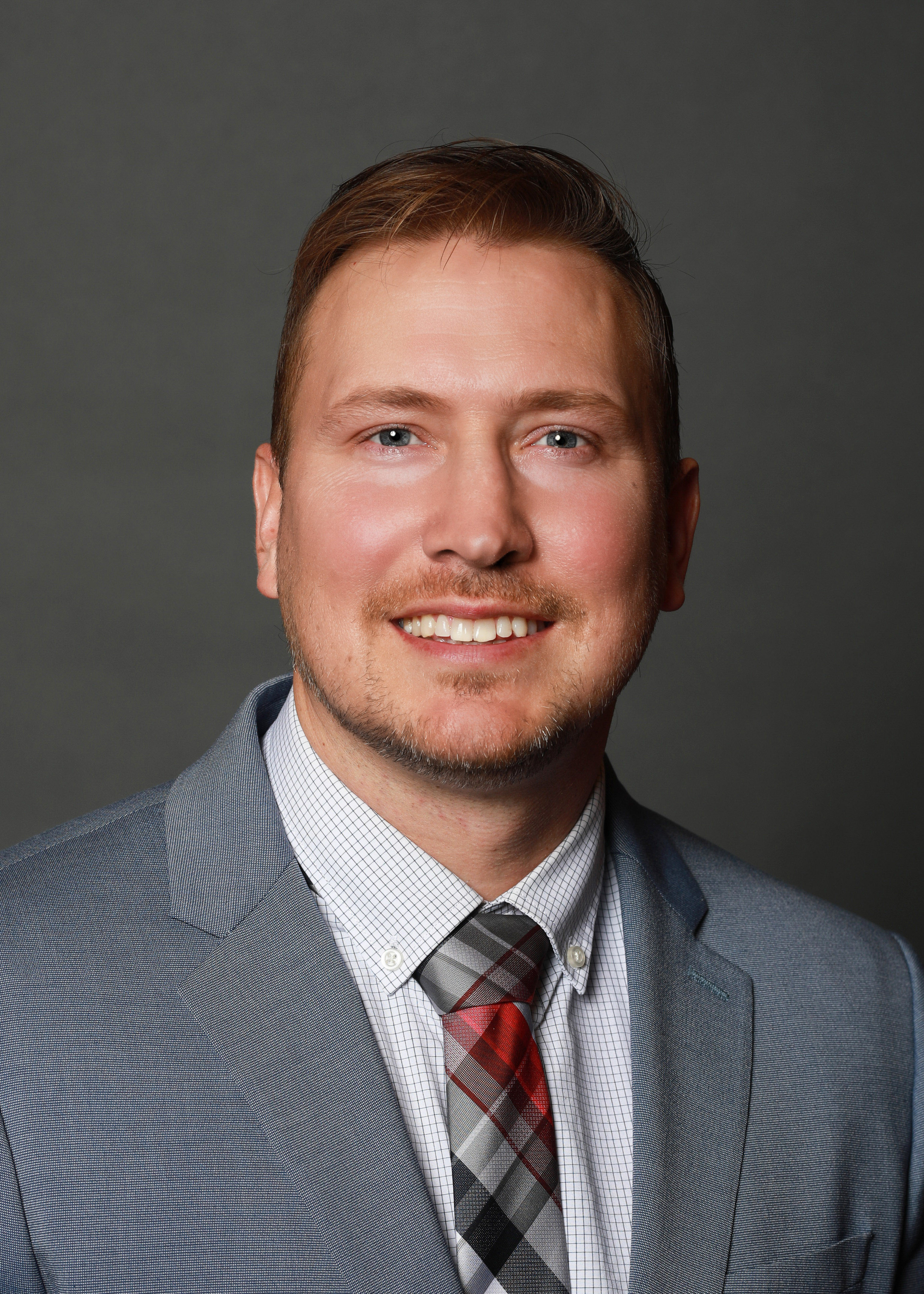
- Sorensen in 2021

Member of the Iowa House of Representatives from the 23rd district
- Incumbent
- Assumed office January 14, 2019
- Preceded by: Clel Baudler

Personal details
- Born: 1979 (age 46–47)
- Party: Republican
- Spouse: Maria
- Children: 3
- Education: Iowa State University

Ray "Bubba" Sorensen II (born 1979) is an American artist, businessman, and politician serving as a member of the Iowa House of Representatives from the 23rd district. Elected in November 2018, he assumed office on January 14, 2019.

== Early life and education ==
Sorensen was born in Creston, Iowa and raised in Fontanelle, Iowa. He studied art at Iowa State University.

== Career ==
Prior to entering politics, Sorensen worked as a graphic designer for Edje Technologies and Livestock Plus. He also co-owns, with his wife, Sorensen Studios, a photography and mural-painting business. After watching Saving Private Ryan as a 19 year old at Iowa State University in 1999, Sorensen was inspired to paint the first Freedom Rock, located along Interstate 80 near Menlo, Iowa.

Sorensen was elected to the Iowa House of Representatives in November 2018 and assumed office on January 14, 2019. He serves as chair of the House Economic Growth Committee. He previously served as vice chair of the House Appropriations Committee.

Iowa House of Representatives
Preceded by David Sieck	23rd District; 2023 – present	Succeeded by Incumbent
Preceded by Clel Baudler	20th District; 2019–2023	Succeeded by Josh Turek
