= Mike Van Camp =

American politician

Member of the Iowa House of Representatives from the 58th district
- In office January 10, 1983 – January 8, 1989
- Preceded by: Philip Davitt
- Succeeded by: Jim Lykam

Personal details
- Born: February 16, 1941 (age 85) Davenport, Iowa
- Party: Republican

Mike Van Camp (born February 16, 1941) is an American politician who served in the Iowa House of Representatives from the 58th district from 1983 to 1989.
