= Gene Ficken =

American politician

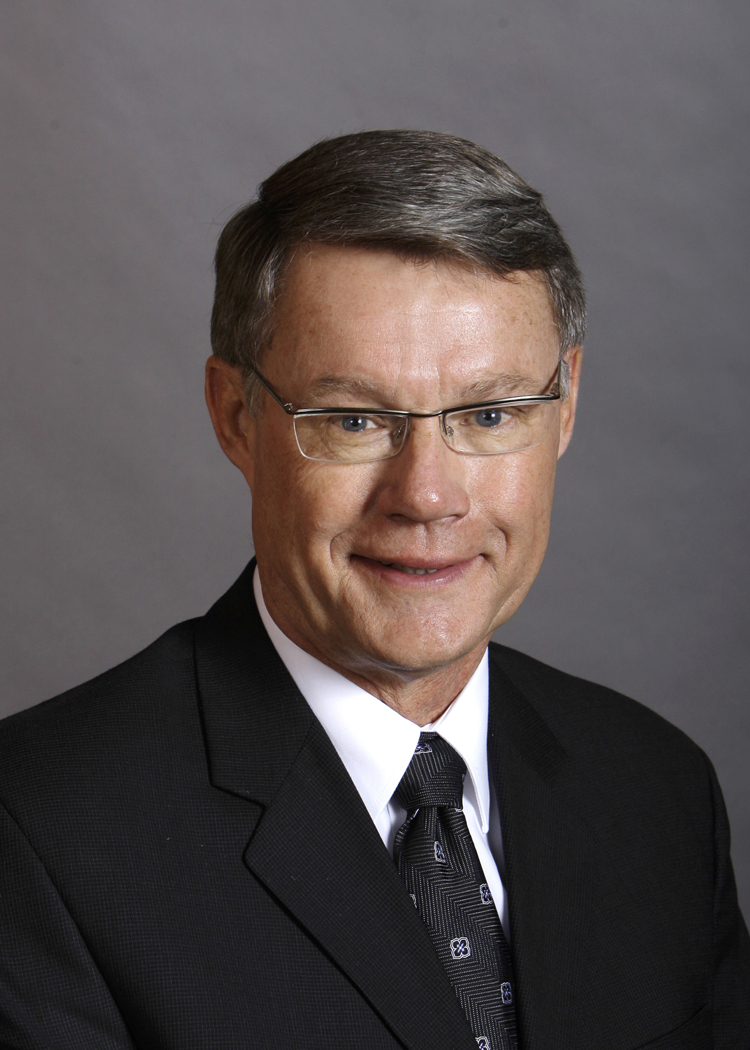

Member of the Iowa House of Representatives from the 23rd district
- Incumbent
- Assumed office 2008

Personal details
- Born: 1944 (age 81–82) Spirit Lake, Iowa
- Party: Democratic
- Education: University of Northern Iowa

Gene Ficken (born 1944) is a Democratic politician, representing the 23rd District in the Iowa House of Representatives since 2008.

Ficken is a retired teacher from Independence Community Schools and a small business owner.

He is a member of the Jaycees and Kiwanis.

== Committee membership ==
- Education Committee, Iowa House of Representatives (Vice Chair)
- Natural Resources Committee, Iowa House of Representatives
- Subcommittee on Education Appropriations
- Veterans Affairs Committee, Iowa House of Representatives

== Election ==
=== 2008 ===
On November 4, 2008, Ficken was elected to the 23rd District Seat in the Iowa House of Representatives, defeating Dan Rasmussen (R). Ficken raised $317,415 for his campaign, while Rasmussen raised $230,231.

=== 2010 ===
Iowa House of Representatives District 23 General Election Unofficial Iowa Election Results

Gene Ficken (D) (5381 votes) (49.02%)
Dan Rasmussen (R) (5587 votes) (50.90%)
write in (9 votes) (0.08%)
