= New Auburn, Minnesota =

City in Minnesota, United States

New Auburn
- City
- Location of New Auburn within Sibley County, Minnesota
- Coordinates: 44°40′22″N 94°13′55″W
- Country: United States
- State: Minnesota
- County: Sibley

Government
  - Type: Mayor - Council
  - Mayor: Mandy Grack

Area
  - Total: 0.68 sq mi (1.77 km^{2})
  - Land: 0.68 sq mi (1.77 km^{2})
  - Water: 0 sq mi (0.00 km^{2})
- Elevation: 1,011 ft (308 m)

Population (2020)
  - Total: 411
  - Density: 602.7/sq mi (232.69/km^{2})
- Time zone: UTC-6 (Central (CST))
  - Summer (DST): UTC-5 (CDT)
- ZIP code: 55366
- Area code: 320
- FIPS code: 27-45376
- GNIS feature ID: 2395184
- Website: https://newauburnmn.com/

New Auburn is a city in Sibley County, Minnesota, United States. As of the 2020 census, New Auburn had a population of 411.

== History ==
New Auburn was platted in 1856, and named after Auburn, New York. A post office called New Auburn has been in operation since 1857.

== Geography ==
According to the United States Census Bureau, the city has a total area of 0.69 square miles (1.79 km^{2}), all land.

Minnesota State Highway 22 serves as a main route in the community.

== Demographics ==
Historical population
Census	Pop.	Note	%±
1880	204		—
1900	274		—
1910	261		−4.7%
1920	209		−19.9%
1930	245		17.2%
1940	263		7.3%
1950	290		10.3%
1960	299		3.1%
1970	274		−8.4%
1980	331		20.8%
1990	363		9.7%
2000	488		34.4%
2010	456		−6.6%
2020	411		−9.9%
U.S. Decennial Census

=== 2010 census ===
As of the census of 2010, there were 456 people, 176 households, and 121 families residing in the city. The population density was 660.9 inhabitants per square mile (255.2/km^{2}). There were 206 housing units at an average density of 298.6 per square mile (115.3/km^{2}). The racial makeup of the city was 91.4% White, 6.8% from other races, and 1.8% from two or more races. Hispanic or Latino of any race were 12.5% of the population.

There were 176 households, of which 39.8% had children under the age of 18 living with them, 48.3% were married couples living together, 10.2% had a female householder with no husband present, 10.2% had a male householder with no wife present, and 31.3% were non-families. 25.0% of all households were made up of individuals, and 7.4% had someone living alone who was 65 years of age or older. The average household size was 2.59 and the average family size was 3.11.

The median age in the city was 32.8 years. 31.1% of residents were under the age of 18; 7.4% were between the ages of 18 and 24; 27% were from 25 to 44; 26.3% were from 45 to 64; and 8.1% were 65 years of age or older. The gender makeup of the city was 53.1% male and 46.9% female.

=== 2000 census ===
As of the census of 2000, there were 488 citizens, 169 households, and 130 families residing in the city. The population density was 987.6 citizens per square mile (384.5/km^{2}). There were 182 housing units at an average density of 368.3 per square mile (142.2/km^{2}). The racial makeup of the city was 90.37% White, 0.20% African American, 0.61% Native American, 8.40% from other races, and 0.41% from two or more races. Hispanic or Latino of any race were 14.34% of the population.

There were 169 households, out of which 41.4% had children under the age of 18 living with them, 58.0% were married couples living together, 8.9% had a female householder with no husband present, and 22.5% were non-families. 15.4% of all households were made up of individuals, and 7.1% had someone living alone who was 65 years of age or older. The average household size was 2.89 and the average family size was 3.11.

In the city, the population was spread out, with 34.4% under the age of 18, 10.2% from 18 to 24, 30.3% from 25 to 44, 16.8% from 45 to 64, and 8.2% who were 65 years of age or older. The median age was 28 years. For every 100 females, there were 100.8 males. For every 100 females age 18 and over, there were 100.0 males.

The median income for a household in the city was $38,542, and the median income for a family was $41,538. Males had a median income of $28,125 versus $24,500 for females. The per capita income for the city was $13,943. About 9.7% of families and 13.4% of the population were below the poverty line, including 19.6% of those under age 18 and 10.5% of those age 65 or over.

== Notable person ==
- Marv Diemer, Iowa state legislator
