= Philip Davitt =

American politician (1931–1994)

Member of the Iowa House of Representatives from the 68th district
- In office January 10, 1983 – January 13, 1985
- Preceded by: Jack E. Woods
- Succeeded by: Linda L. Beatty

Member of the Iowa House of Representatives from the 58th district
- In office January 10, 1977 – January 10, 1983
- Preceded by: Glen Bortell
- Succeeded by: Mike Van Camp

Personal details
- Born: May 23, 1931 Madison County, Iowa
- Died: October 21, 1994 (aged 63) Bella Vista, Arkansas
- Party: Democratic

Philip A. Davitt (May 23, 1931 – October 21, 1994) was an American politician who served in the Iowa House of Representatives from 1977 to 1985.

He died of a heart attack on October 21, 1994, in Bella Vista, Arkansas at age 63.
