= William Witt =

American politician

Member of the Iowa House of Representatives
- In office January 11, 1993 – January 12, 2003

Personal details
- Born: February 2, 1950 (age 76) Elkader, Iowa, United States
- Party: Democratic
- Spouse: Karen J. Franczyk
- Education: University of Northern Iowa
- Occupation: photojournalist

William G. Witt (born February 2, 1950) is an American politician in the state of Iowa.

== Biography ==
Witt was born in Elkader, Iowa and attended University of Northern Iowa. A Democrat, he served in the Iowa House of Representatives from 1993 to 2003 (23rd district). Witt specialized in the policy areas of long-term care of the elderly and persons with disabilities and natural resource conservation and environmental protection. He led an eight-year-long, ultimately successful, campaign to reform Iowa's Medicaid reimbursement system for long-term care facilities.

Writing and photographing under the byline "Bill Witt", he published numerous freelance magazine articles, as well as two books from the University of Iowa Press: Enchanted by Prairie (2009) and A Field Guide to Iowa's Native Orchids (2006). He won International Regional Magazine Awards (IRMA) for feature writing (1997) and photography (2000).
