= 2016 Iowa Republican presidential caucuses =

- February 1, 2016

30 pledged delegates to the Republican National Convention
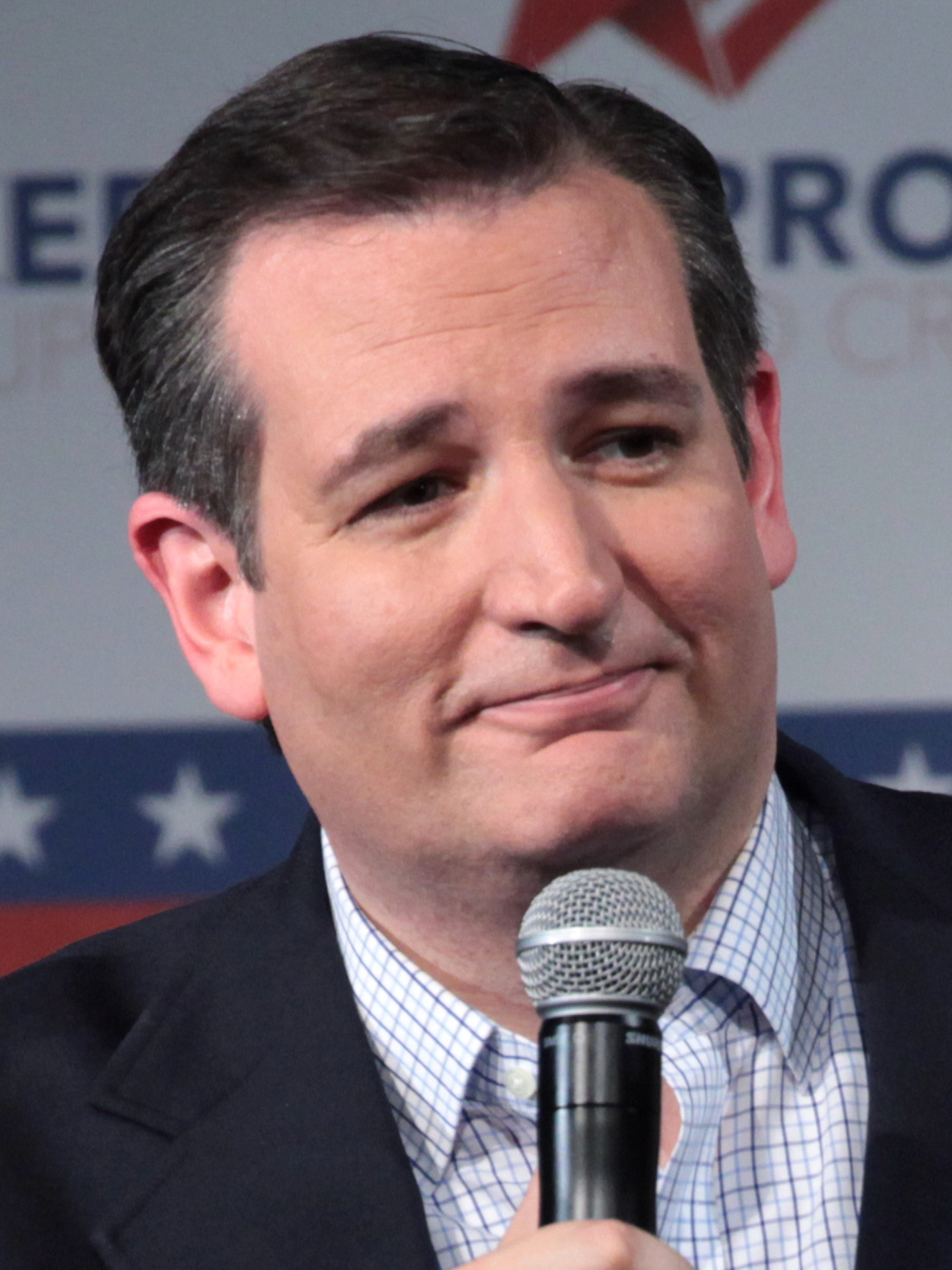

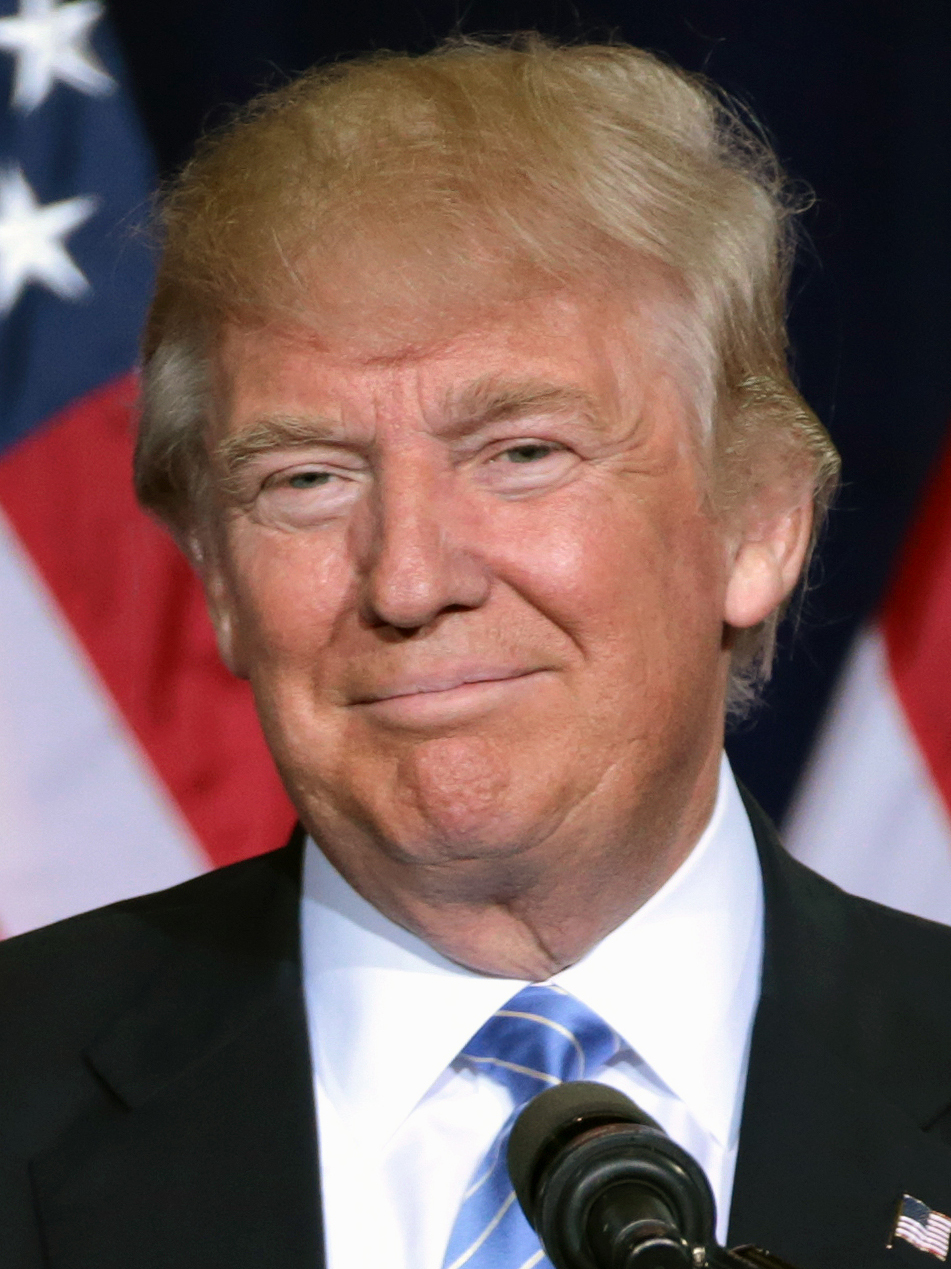

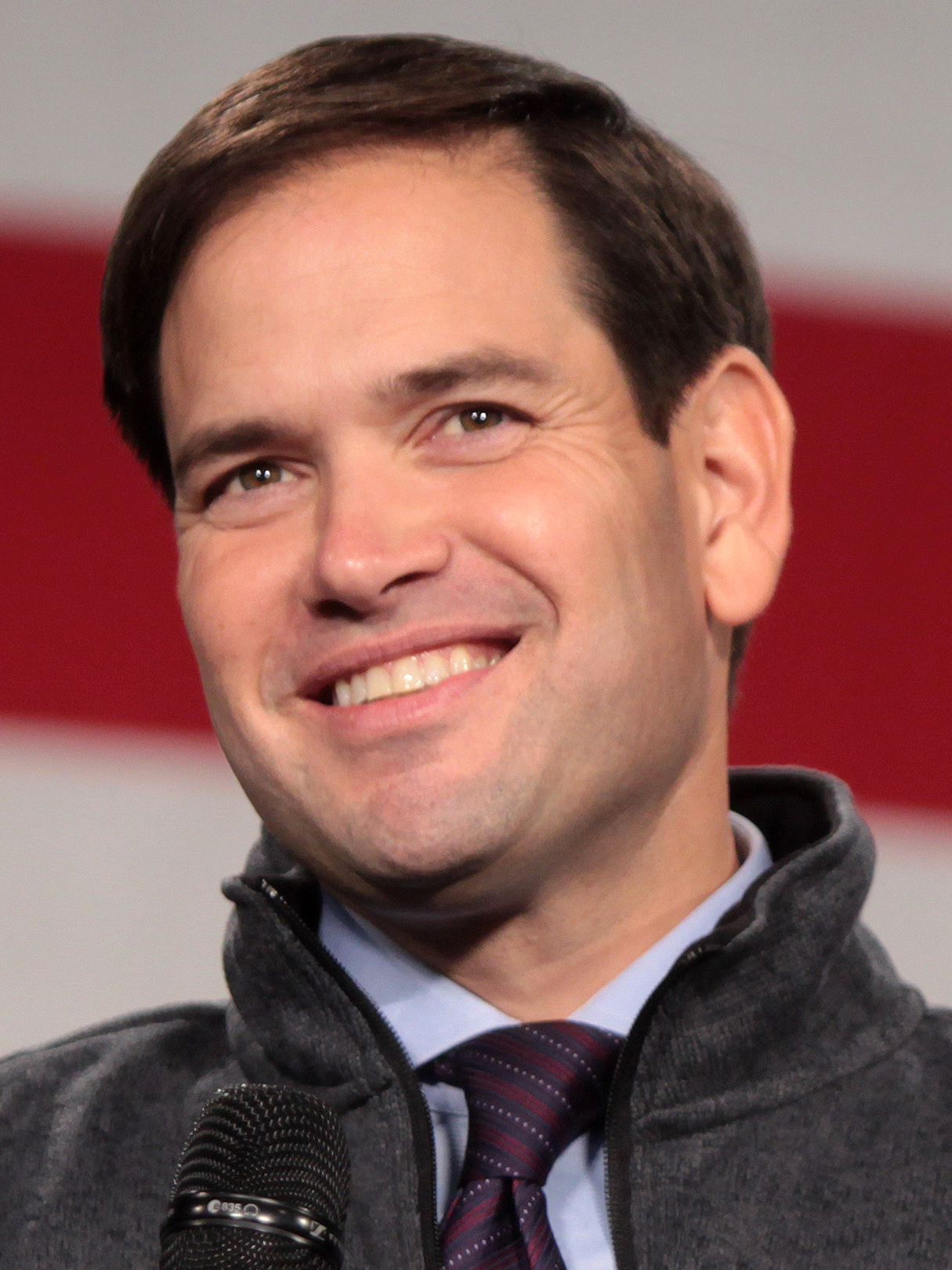

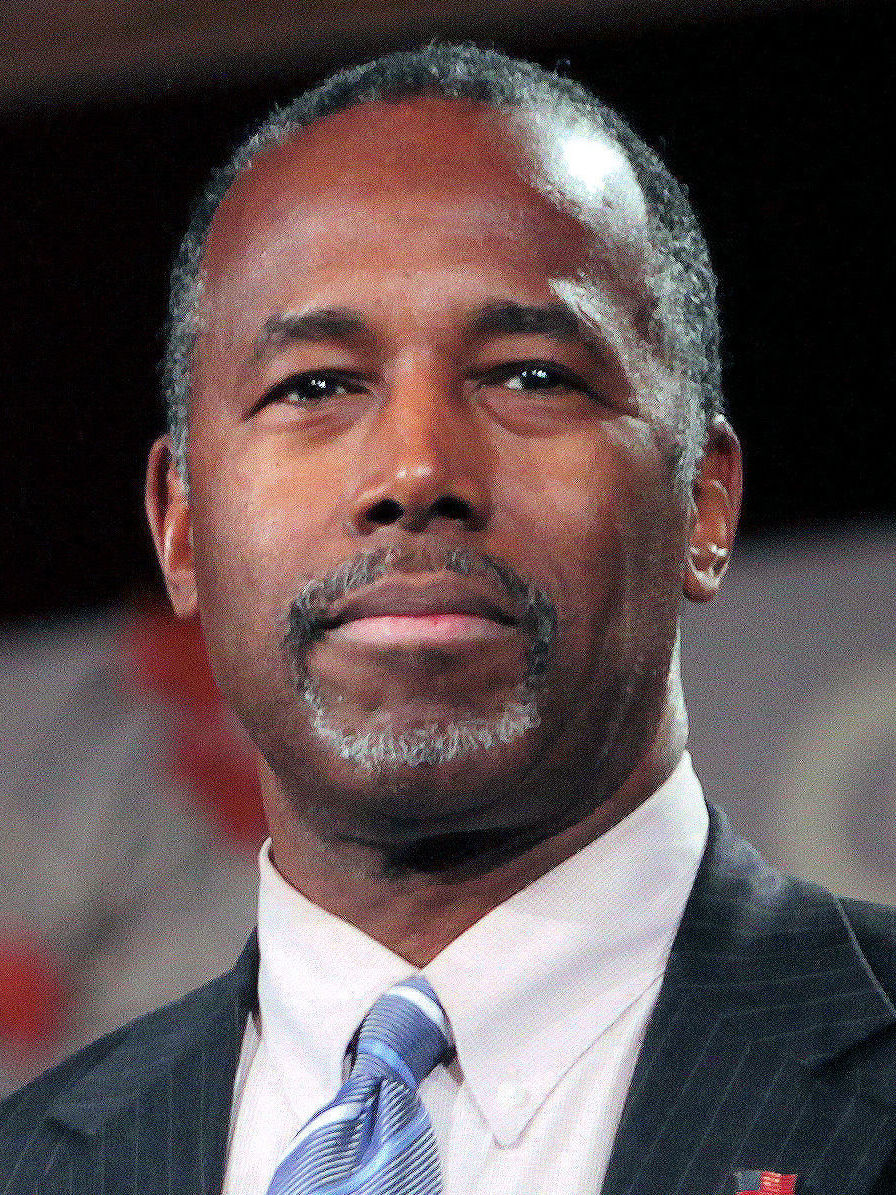

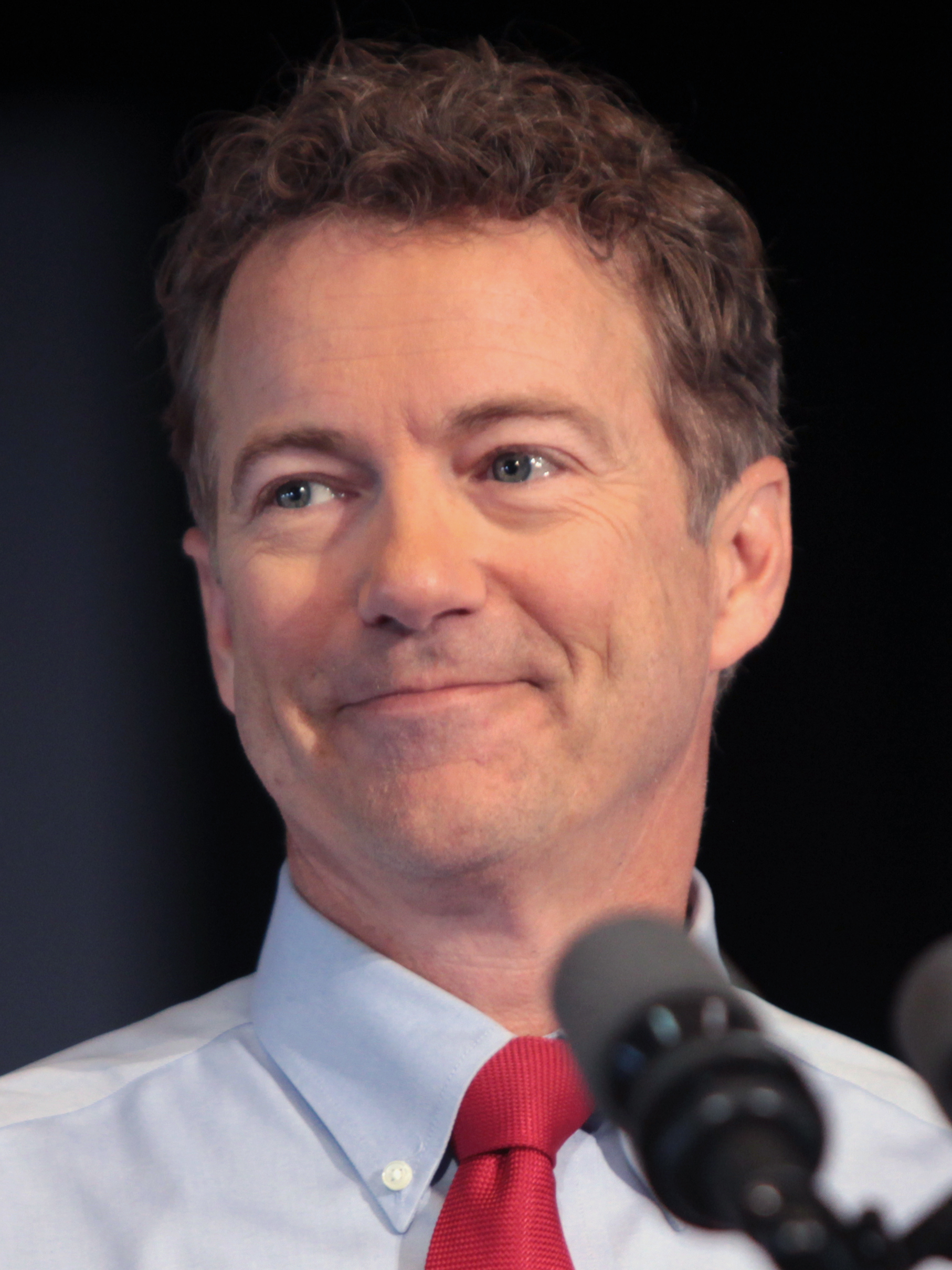

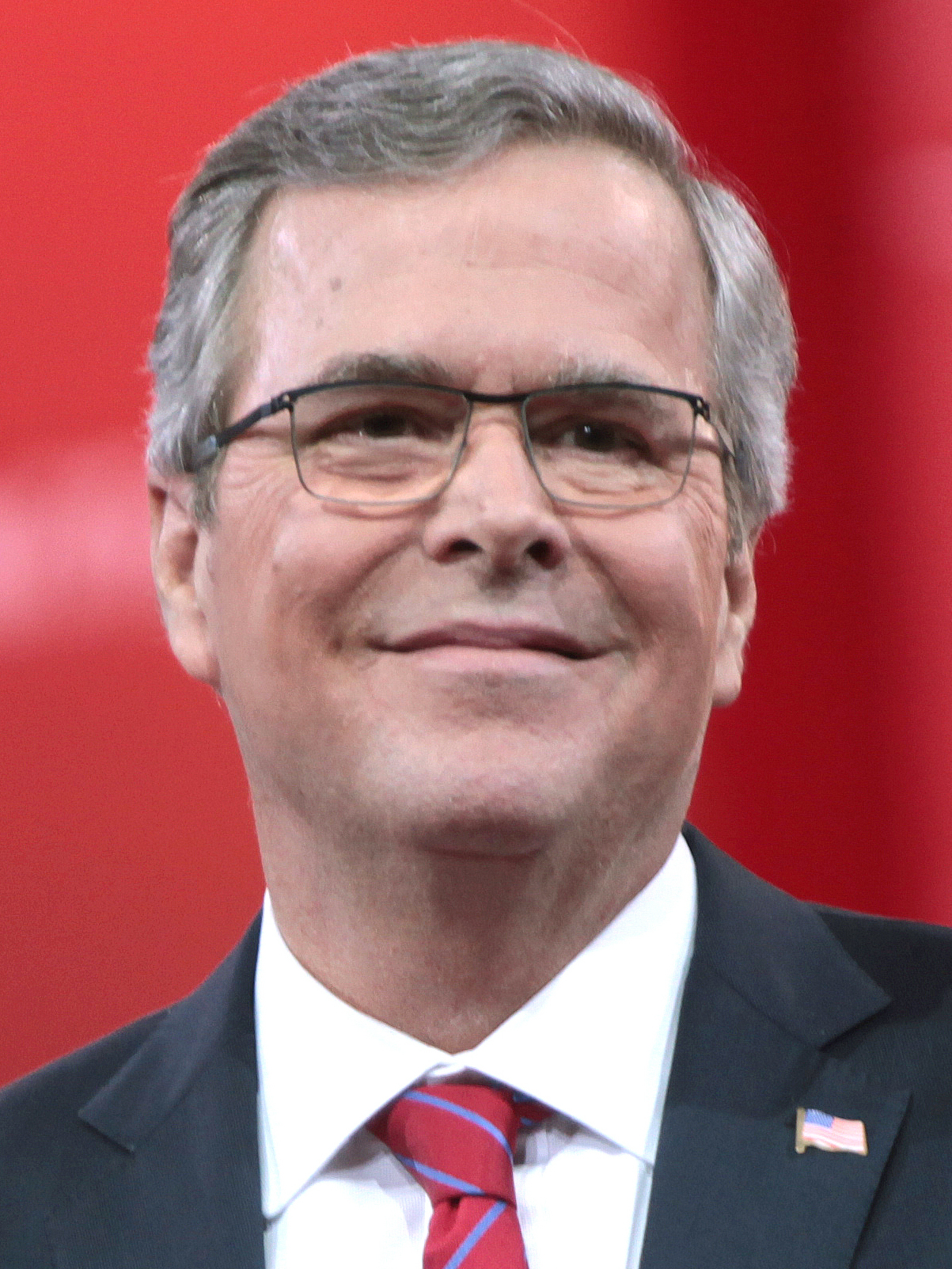

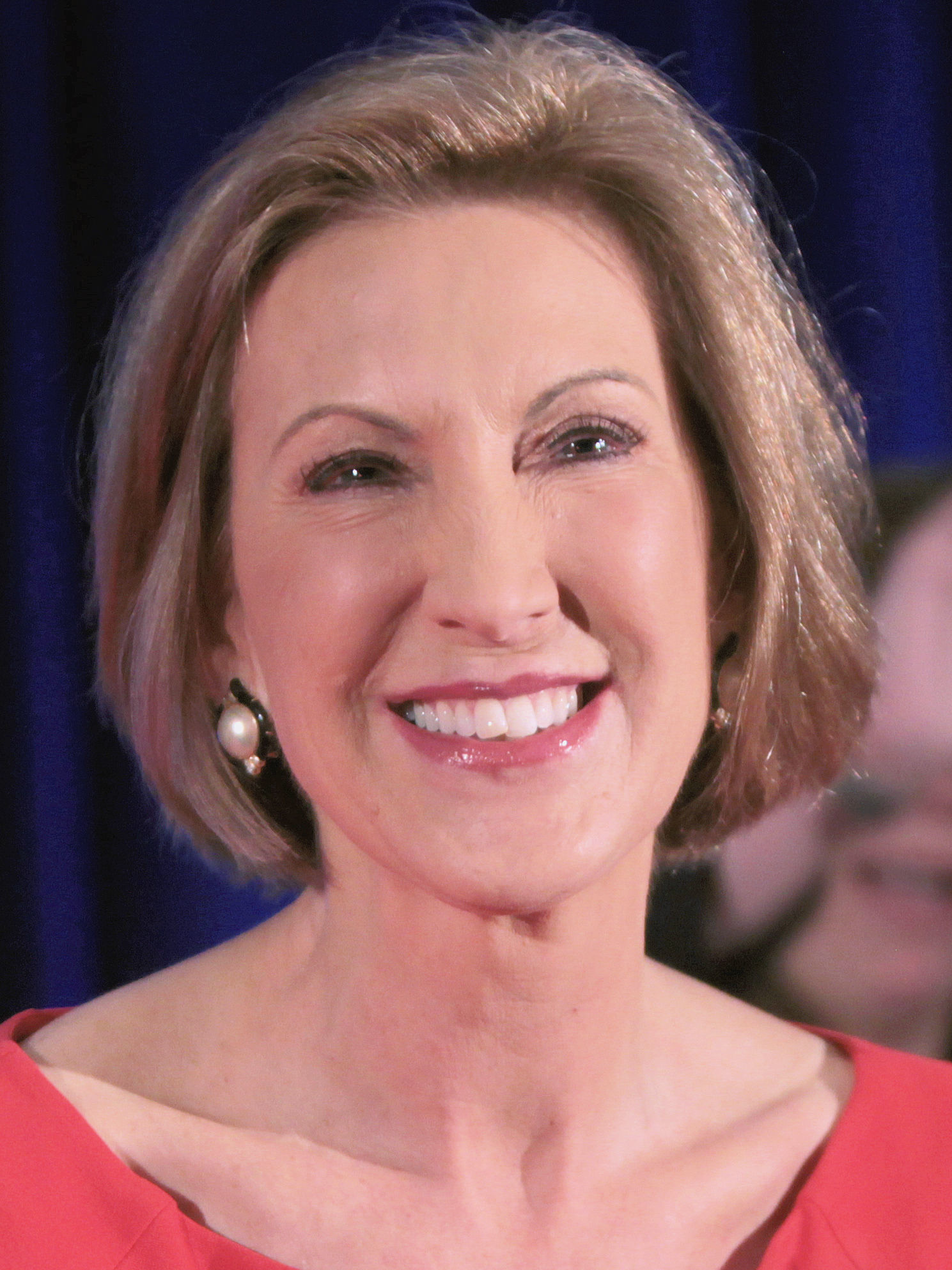

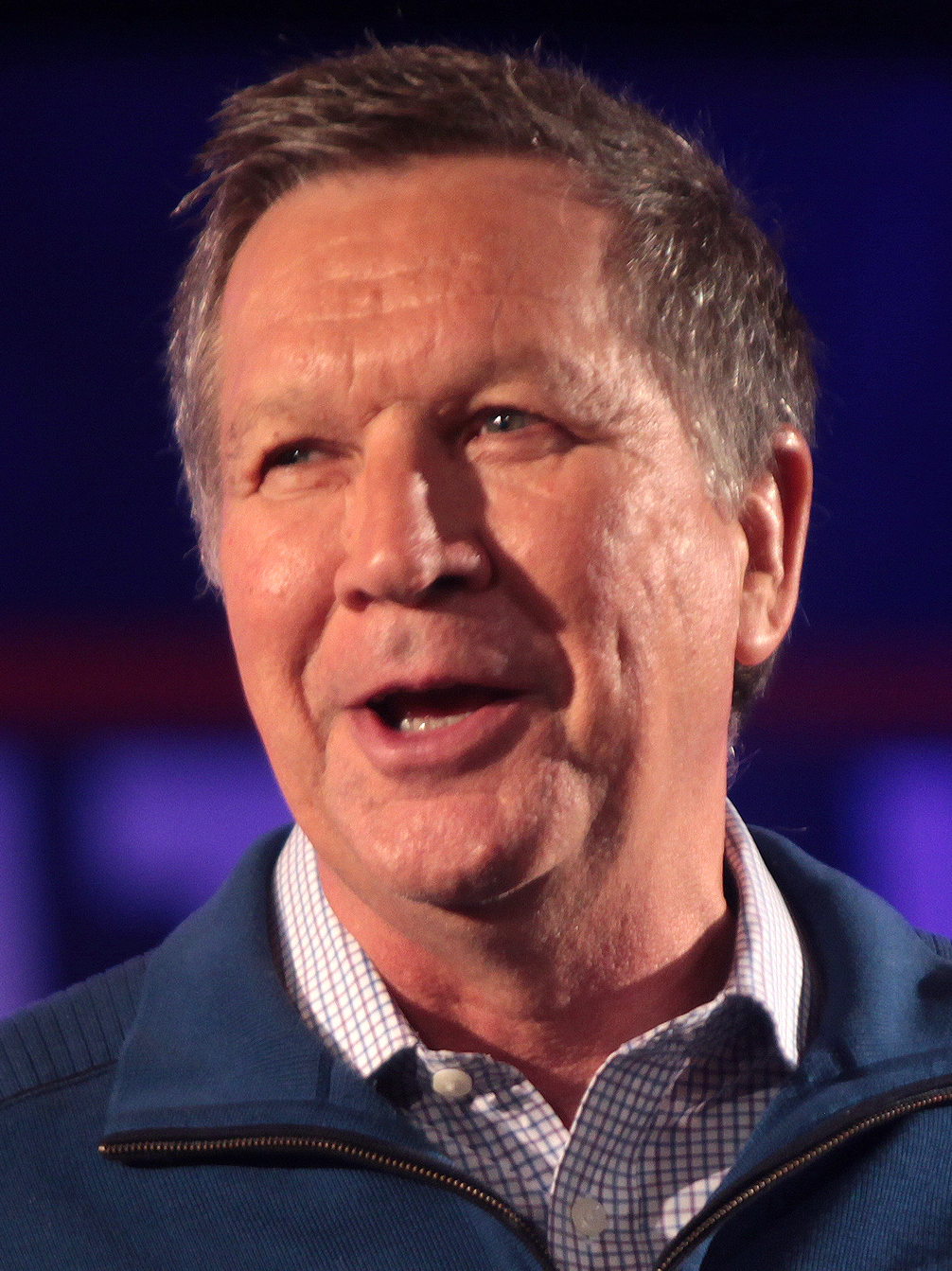

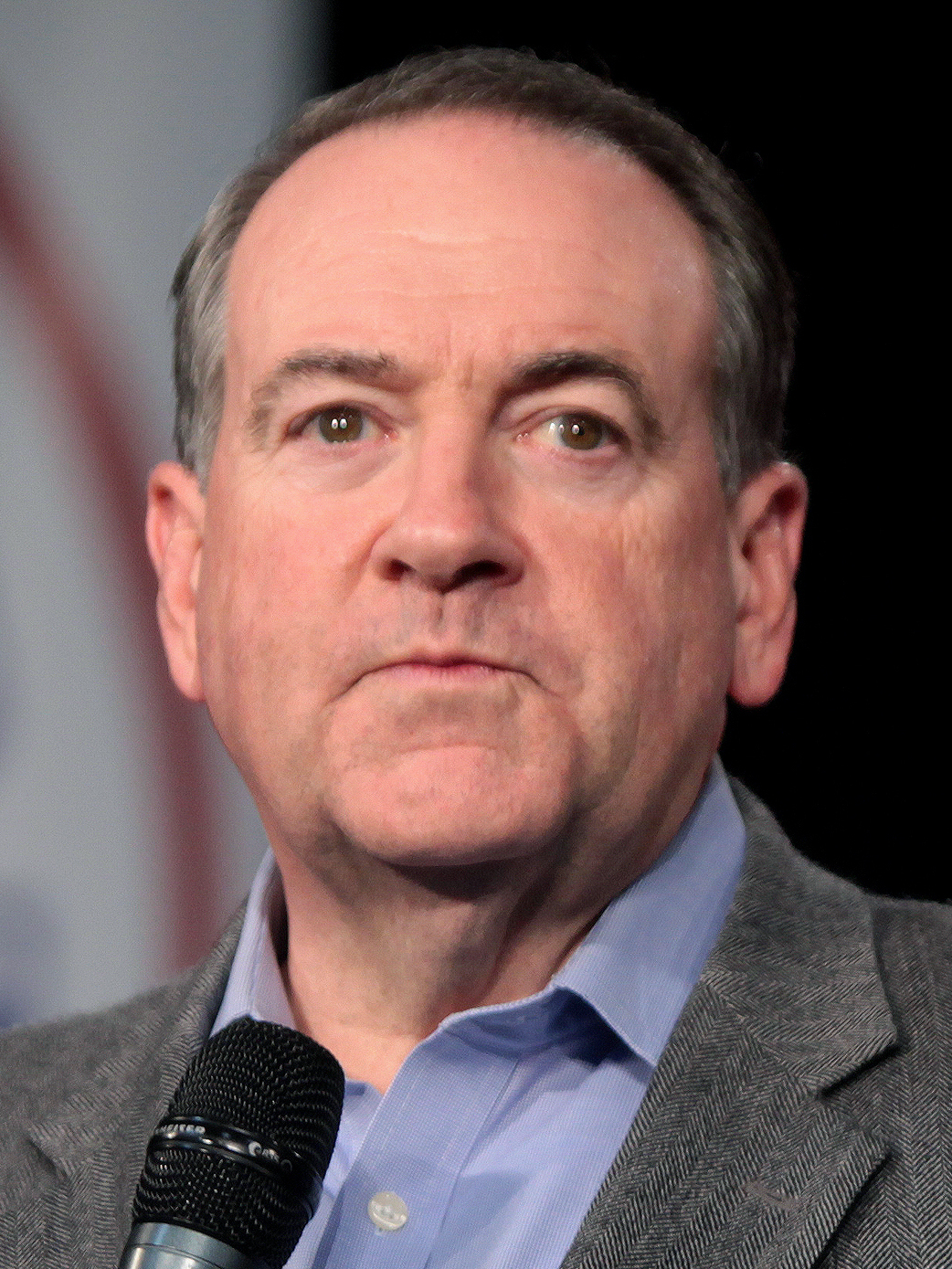
Candidate	Ted Cruz	Donald Trump	Marco Rubio
Home state	Texas	New York	Florida
Delegate count	8	7	7
Popular vote	51,666	45,429	43,228
Percentage	27.6%	24.3%	23.1%
Candidate	Ben Carson	Rand Paul	Jeb Bush
Home state	Virginia	Kentucky	Florida
Delegate count	3	1	1
Popular vote	17,394	8,481	5,238
Percentage	9.3%	4.5%	2.8%
Candidate	Carly Fiorina	John Kasich	Mike Huckabee
Home state	Virginia	Ohio	Arkansas
Delegate count	1	1	1
Popular vote	3,485	3,474	3,345
Percentage	1.9%	1.9%	1.8%
Results by county
Ted Cruz 20–30% 30-40% 40–50%	Donald Trump 20–30% 30–40% 40–50%	Marco Rubio 20–30% 30–40%
Tie

The 2016 Iowa Republican presidential caucuses took place on February 1 in the U.S. state of Iowa, traditionally marking the Republican Party's first nominating contest in their series of presidential primaries ahead of the 2016 presidential election.

The Democratic Party held its own Iowa caucuses on the same day.

Ted Cruz was able to defeat Donald Trump in the Iowa Caucus by winning over Evangelical caucus-goers; Cruz won 51,666 caucus votes or 27.6%, giving him a net gain of one delegate over Trump. Cruz visited all 99 counties of Iowa and held small events. Cruz outperformed his polling average, which predicted a narrow Trump victory in the caucus.

Following poor performances in the caucuses, Rand Paul, Mike Huckabee and Rick Santorum suspended their campaigns. Both Huckabee and Santorum had previously won the caucus in 2008 and 2012 respectively.

== Procedure ==
According to the Republican Party of Iowa's bylaws, if more than one candidate is nominated at the Republican National Convention, all of Iowa's delegates are bound to vote "proportionally in accordance with the outcome of the Iowa Caucuses" on the first ballot, even if the candidate has withdrawn from the race. The ballot is a blank piece of paper, and the candidates that voters may vote for in the non-binding preference poll included the following:

- Jeb Bush
- Ben Carson
- Chris Christie
- Ted Cruz
- Carly Fiorina
- Jim Gilmore
- John Kasich
- Marco Rubio
- Donald Trump
- Rand Paul
- Rick Santorum
- Mike Huckabee

=== Caucus operations ===
The caucuses began at 7:00 PM local time across 1,681 precincts statewide. After the selection of caucus chairs and secretaries, campaign representatives made speeches supporting their candidates before voters cast their preferences on paper ballots. The 2016 Republican caucuses set a new turnout record with 186,932 participants, significantly higher than the 121,503 who participated in 2012.

== Campaign ==
The Iowa caucuses required extensive ground organization and retail politics from the candidates. Ted Cruz's campaign pursued a traditional grassroots approach, completing the "Full Grassley" by visiting all 99 counties in Iowa while building relationships with evangelical and conservative leaders. His campaign utilized sophisticated data analytics and microtargeting to identify and turn out likely supporters.

Donald Trump opted for a less conventional strategy, focusing on large rallies that drew thousands of attendees across the state and earned media coverage. However, questions persisted about whether his unorthodox approach could successfully convert rally attendance into caucus participation from first-time voters.

Marco Rubio positioned himself as an electable conservative alternative, particularly appealing to suburban voters and party regulars. His campaign emphasized his youth and vision for a "New American Century," gaining momentum in the final weeks before the caucuses.

== Forums and debates ==
November 20, 2015 – Des Moines, Iowa The Presidential Family Forum was held in the Community Choice Credit Union Convention Center in Des Moines, Iowa. Ben Carson, Ted Cruz, Carly Fiorina, Mike Huckabee, Rand Paul, Marco Rubio, and Rick Santorum attended the forum hosted by evangelical Christian advocacy group The Family Leader. It was hosted by politician and political activist Bob Vander Plaats and moderated by political consultant and pollster Frank Luntz. Protesters interrupted the beginning of the event and were removed by police.

January 28, 2016 – Des Moines, Iowa The seventh debate was the second debate to air on Fox News. As in Fox's first debate, the moderators were Bret Baier, Megyn Kelly, and Chris Wallace. This was the last debate before actual voting began with the Iowa caucuses on February 1, 2016. Due to personality conflicts with Fox News, Donald Trump opted out of the debate.

== Endorsements ==
Cruz secured several influential endorsements that proved crucial to his victory, including Congressman Steve King, who represented Iowa's 4th congressional district, and Bob Vander Plaats, president of The Family Leader, a prominent evangelical organization.

Trump notably received limited support from Iowa Republican officials, though he led most pre-caucus polls. Meanwhile, Rubio gained important momentum when he received the endorsement of the Des Moines Register and other newspapers in the closing weeks of the campaign.

Jeb Bush

Former executive branch officials

- Mary Kramer, United States Ambassador to Barbados and the Eastern Caribbean (2004–2006)

U.S. Representatives

- Greg Ganske, IA-04 (1995–2003)

State Senators

- Charles Schneider, state senator from the District 22 (2013–present)

State Representatives

- Ron Jorgensen, state representative from the District 6 (2011–present)
- Greg Forristall, state representative from the District 22 (2007–present)
- Zach Nunn, state representative from the District 30 (2015–present)
- Renee Schulte, Former state representative from the District 37 (2008–2013)
- Robert Bacon, state representative from the District 48 (2013–Present)
- Ken Rizer, state representative from the District 68 (2015–present)
- Dave Heaton, state representative from the District 91 (1995–Present)
- Linda Miller, state representative from the District 94 (2007–Present)
Ben Carson

State Representatives

- Rob Taylor, state representative from the District 44 (2013–present)
Chris Christie

State Representatives

- Jake Highfill, state representative from the District 39 (2013–present)
- Chip Baltimore, state representative from the District 47 (2011–present)
- Dave Deyoe, state representative from the District 51 (2007–present)
- Kraig Paulsen, state representative from the District 67 (2003–present)
- Gary Carlson, state representative from the District 91 (2015–present)
Ted Cruz

U.S. Representatives

- Steve King, IA-04 (2003–Present)

State Senators

- Randy Feenstra, state senator from the 2nd district (2009–Present)
- Bill Anderson, state senator from the 3rd district (2011–Present)
- Dennis Guth, state senator from the 4th district (2013-Present)
- Jason Schultz, state senator from the 9th district (2015–Present)
- Jake Chapman, state senator from the 10th district (2013–Present)
- Jerry Behn, state senator from the 24th district (1997–Present)

State Representatives

- Terry Baxter, state representative from the District 8 (2015–Present)
- Steven Holt, state representative from the District 12 (2015–Present)
- Ralph Watts, state representative from the District 19 (2003–Present)
- Greg Heartsill, state representative from the District 28 (2013–Present)
- Sandy Salmon, state representative from the District 63 (2013–Present)
- Larry Sheets, state representative from the District 80 (2013–Present)

Notable individuals

- Bob Vander Plaats, political activist and president and CEO of The Family Leader
Carly Fiorina

State Senators

- David Johnson, state senator from the 1st district (2003-Present)

State Representatives

- Mike May, state representative from the District 6 (2005–2011)
- Mike Sexton, state representative from the District 7 (2015–present)
- Clel Baudler, state representative from the District 20 (1999–present)
- Josh Byrnes, state representative from the District 51 (2011–present)
- Steven Olson, state representative from the District 83 (2003–present)
- Ross Paustian, state representative from the District 92 (2015–present)
John Kasich

State Representatives

- Mary Ann Hanusa, state representative from the District 16 (2011–present)
- David Sieck, state representative from the District 86 (2015–present)
Mike Huckabee

State Representatives

- Tedd Gassman, state representative from the District 7 (2013–present)
Marco Rubio

State Senators

- Rick Bertrand, state senator from the 7th district (2011–present)
- Tom Shipley, state senator from the 11th district(2015-Present)
- Jack Whitver, state senator from the 19th district (2011–present)
- Dan Zumbach, state senator from the 48th district (2013–present)

State Representatives

- Megan Jones, state representative from the District 6 (2013–Present)
- John Wills, state representative from the District 10 (2015–Present)
- Brian Best, state representative from the District 11 (2015–Present)
- Bobby Kaufmann, state representative from the District 82 (2013–present)

Newspapers

- The Des Moines Register
- Sioux City Journal
Rick Santorum

State Representatives

- Dean Fisher, state representative from the District 53 (2013-Present)
- Walt Rogers, state representative from the District 60 (2011-Present)
Donald Trump

State Senators

- Brad Zaun, state senator from the 20th district (2005-Present)

=== Withdrawn candidates ===
Lindsey Graham (Withdrawn)

State Senators

- Tim Kapucian, state senator from the 38th district (2009-Present)
Bobby Jindal (Withdrawn)

State Representatives

- Matt Windschitl, state representative from the District 17 (2007–present)
Rick Perry (Withdrawn)

State Representatives

- Dawn Pettengill, state representative from the District 75 (2005-Present)
Scott Walker (Withdrawn)

State Senators

- Mark Costello, state senator from the 8th district (2015-Present)
- Jason Schultz, state senator from the 9th district (2015-Present)
- Julian Garrett, state senator from the 11th district (2013-Present)
- Amy Sinclair, state senator from the 14th district (2013-Present)

State Representatives

- John Landon, state representative from the District 37 (2013-Present)

== Polling ==
=== Aggregate polls ===
Source of poll aggregation	Dates administered	Dates updated	Marco Rubio Republican	Donald Trump Republican	Ted Cruz Republican	Margin
RealClearPolitics	until February 1, 2016	February 1, 2016	16.9%	28.6%	23.9%	Trump +4.7
FiveThirtyEight	until February 1, 2016	February 1, 2016	18.1%	25.6%	24.3%	Trump +1.3

Poll source	Date	1st	2nd	3rd	Other
Caucus results	February 1, 2016	Ted Cruz; 27.64%	Donald Trump; 24.30%	Marco Rubio; 23.12%	Ben Carson 9.30%, Rand Paul 4.54%, Jeb Bush 2.80%, Carly Fiorina 1.86%, John Kasich 1.86%, Mike Huckabee 1.79%, Chris Christie 1.76%, Rick Santorum 0.95%, Jim Gilmore 0.01%, Other 0.06%
Emerson College Margin of error: ± 5.6% Sample size: 298	January 29–31, 2016	Donald Trump; 27.3%	Ted Cruz; 25.6%	Marco Rubio; 21.6%	Mike Huckabee 4.7%, Jeb Bush 3.8%, John Kasich 3.8%, Rand Paul 3.4%, Ben Carson 3.4%, Chris Christie 3.2%, Carly Fiorina 1.7%, Rick Santorum 0.5%, Undecided 1%
Quinnipiac University Margin of error: ± 3.3% Sample size: 890	January 25–31, 2016	Donald Trump; 31%	Ted Cruz; 24%	Marco Rubio; 17%	Ben Carson 8%, Jeb Bush 4%, Rand Paul 4%, Mike Huckabee 3%, Carly Fiorina 2%, John Kasich 2%, Chris Christie 1%, Rick Santorum 1%, Jim Gilmore 0%, Not decided 3%
Opinion Savvy Margin of error: ± 3.2% Sample size: 887	January 29–30, 2016	Donald Trump; 20.1%	Ted Cruz; 19.4%	Marco Rubio; 18.6%	Ben Carson 9.0%, Rand Paul 8.6%, Jeb Bush 4.9%, Mike Huckabee 4.4%, John Kasich 4.0%, Carly Fiorina 3.8%, Chris Christie 3.0%, Rick Santorum 2.1%, Undecided 2.2%
Des Moines Register/ Bloomberg/Selzer Margin of error: ± 3.5% Sample size: 602	January 26–29, 2016	Donald Trump; 28%	Ted Cruz; 23%	Marco Rubio; 15%	Ben Carson 10%, Rand Paul 5%, Chris Christie 3%, Jeb Bush 2%, Mike Huckabee 2%, Carly Fiorina 2%, John Kasich 2%, Rick Santorum 2%, Jim Gimore 0%, Undecided 2%, Uncommitted 3%
Public Policy Polling Margin of error: ± 3.5% Sample size: 780	January 26–27, 2016	Donald Trump; 31%	Ted Cruz; 23%	Marco Rubio; 14%	Ben Carson 9%, Jeb Bush 4%, Mike Huckabee 4%, Rand Paul 4%, Carly Fiorina 3%, John Kasich 2%, Chris Christie 2%, Rick Santorum 1%, Jim Gimore 1%, Undecided 2%
NBC/WSJ/Marist Margin of error: ± 4.8% Sample size: 415	January 24–26, 2016	Donald Trump; 32%	Ted Cruz; 25%	Marco Rubio; 18%	Ben Carson 8%, Jeb Bush 4%, Carly Fiorina 2%, John Kasich 2%, Rand Paul 2%, Chris Christie 2%, Mike Huckabee 2%, Other 0%, Undecided 3%
Monmouth University Margin of error: ± 4.4% Sample size: 500	January 23–26, 2016	Donald Trump; 30%	Ted Cruz; 23%	Marco Rubio; 16%	Ben Carson 10%, Jeb Bush 4%, Rand Paul 3%, John Kasich 3%, Mike Huckabee 3%, Chris Christie 2%, Carly Fiorina 2%, Rick Santorum 1%, Jim Gilmore 0%, Other 0%, Undecided 3%
ARG Margin of error: ± 5.0% Sample size: 400	January 21–24, 2016	Donald Trump; 33%	Ted Cruz; 26%	Marco Rubio; 11%	Ben Carson 7%, Chris Christie 4%, Rand Paul 4%, Jeb Bush 3%, John Kasich 3%, Mike Huckabee 2%, Rick Santorum 1%, Carly Fiorina 1%, Jim Gilmore 0%, Other 1%, Undecided 5%
Quinnipiac University Margin of error: ± 3.8% Sample size: 651	January 18–24, 2016	Donald Trump; 31%	Ted Cruz; 29%	Marco Rubio; 13%	Ben Carson 7%, Rand Paul 5%, Jeb Bush 4%, Chris Christie 3%, Mike Huckabee 2%, Carly Fiorina 1%, John Kasich 1%, Jim Gilmore 0%, Rick Santorum 0%, Not decided 2%
ISU/WHO-HD Margin of error: ± ?% Sample size: 283	January 5–22, 2016	Ted Cruz; 25.8%	Donald Trump; 18.9%	Ben Carson; 13.4%	Marco Rubio 12.3%, Rand Paul 6.9%, Jeb Bush 3.8%, Mike Huckabee 3.7%, Carly Fiorina 1.1%, Rick Santorum <1%, Chris Christie <1%, John Kasich <1%
Fox News Margin of error: ± 5.0% Sample size: 378	January 18–21, 2016	Donald Trump; 34%	Ted Cruz; 23%	Marco Rubio; 12%	Ben Carson 7%, Rand Paul 6%, Chris Christie 4%, Jeb Bush 4%, John Kasich 2%, Mike Huckabee 2%, Rick Santorum 2%, Carly Fiorina 1%, Other 1%, Don't Know 2%
CBS/YouGov Margin of error: ± 5.9% Sample size: 492	January 18–21, 2016	Donald Trump; 39%	Ted Cruz; 34%	Marco Rubio; 13%	Ben Carson 5%, Rand Paul 3%, Chris Christie 2%, Jeb Bush 1%, John Kasich 1%, Carly Fiorina 1%, Mike Huckabee 0%, Jim Gilmore 0%, No Preference 0%
Emerson College Margin of error: ± 5.9% Sample size: 271	January 18–20, 2016	Donald Trump; 33.1%	Ted Cruz; 22.8%	Marco Rubio; 14.2%	Ben Carson 9.1%, Chris Christie 5.4%, Jeb Bush 5.1%, John Kasich 2.9%, Rand Paul 2.7%, Carly Fiorina 2.1%, Mike Huckabee 1.7%, Undecided 1%
CNN/ORC Margin of error: ± 6.0% Sample size: 266	January 15–20, 2016	Donald Trump; 37%	Ted Cruz; 26%	Marco Rubio; 14%	Ben Carson 6%, Jeb Bush 3%, Mike Huckabee 3%, Rand Paul 2%, Carly Fiorina 1%, Rick Santorum 1%, Chris Christie 1%, John Kasich 1%
Monmouth College/KBUR/Douglas Fulmer & Associates Margin of error: ± 3.7% Sample size: 687	January 18–19, 2016	Ted Cruz; 27%	Donald Trump; 25%	Ben Carson; 11%	Marco Rubio 9%, Jeb Bush 7%, Chris Christie 4%, Mike Huckabee 4%, Rand Paul 3%, John Kasich 3%, Carly Fiorina 3%, Rick Santorum 1%, Jim Gilmore 1%, Undecided 4%
Loras College Margin of error: ± 4.4% Sample size: 500	January 13–18, 2016	Donald Trump; 26%	Ted Cruz; 25%	Marco Rubio; 13%	Ben Carson 8%, Jeb Bush 6%, John Kasich 4%, Chris Christie 3%, Mike Huckabee 3%, Rand Paul 3%, Carly Fiorina 2%, Rick Santorum 1%, Undecide 7%
Public Policy Polling Margin of error: ± 4.3% Sample size: 530	January 8–10, 2016	Donald Trump; 28%	Ted Cruz; 26%	Marco Rubio; 13%	Ben Carson 8%, Jeb Bush 6%, Chris Christie 3%, Carly Fiorina 3%, Mike Huckabee 3%, John Kasich 3%, Rand Paul 3%, Rick Santorum 2%, Jim Gilmore 0%, Undecided 2%
DM Register/Bloomberg Margin of error: ± 4.4% Sample size: 500	January 7–10, 2016	Ted Cruz; 25%	Donald Trump; 22%	Marco Rubio; 12%	Ben Carson 11%, Rand Paul 5%, Jeb Bush 4%, Chris Christie 3%, Mike Huckabee 3%, Carly Fiorina 2%, John Kasich 2%, Rick Santorum 1%
ARG Margin of error: ± 4.0% Sample size: 600	January 6–10, 2016	Donald Trump; 29%	Ted Cruz; 25%	Marco Rubio; 10%	Ben Carson 8%, Chris Christie 6%, Rand Paul 4%, Jeb Bush 3%, John Kasich 3%, Mike Huckabee 2%, Rick Santorum 2%, Carly Fiorina 1%, Other 1%, Undecided 5%
Quinnipiac University Margin of error: ± 4.0% Sample size: 602	January 5–10, 2016	Donald Trump; 31%	Ted Cruz; 29%	Marco Rubio; 15%	Ben Carson 7%, Chris Christie 4%, Jeb Bush 3%, Mike Huckabee 3%, Rand Paul 2%, John Kasich 2%, Carly Fiorina 1%, Rick Santorum 1%, Not decided 5%
Fox News Margin of error: ± 4.0% Sample size: 504	January 4–7, 2016	Ted Cruz; 27%	Donald Trump; 23%	Marco Rubio; 15%	Ben Carson 9%, Jeb Bush 7%, Rand Paul 5%, Chris Christie 4%, Mike Huckabee 2%, Carly Fiorina 1%, John Kasich 1%, Rick Santorum 1%, Other 1%, Undecided 2%
NBC/WSJ/Marist Margin of error: ± 4.6% Sample size: 456	January 2–7, 2016	Ted Cruz; 28%	Donald Trump; 24%	Marco Rubio; 13%	Ben Carson 11%, Rand Paul 5%, Jeb Bush 4%, Chris Christie 3%, Carly Fiorina 3%, Mike Huckabee 2%, John Kasich 2%, Other 1%, Undecided 3%

Polls in 2015

Poll source	Date	1st	2nd	3rd	Other
Gravis Marketing Margin of error: ± 5.0% Sample size: 440	December 18–21, 2015	Donald Trump; 31%	Ted Cruz; 31%	Marco Rubio; 9%	Ben Carson 7%, Jeb Bush 4%, Mike Huckabee 4%, Carly Fiorina 3%, Chris Christie 2%, John Kasich 2%, George Pataki 1%, Lindsey Graham 1%, Rand Paul 1%, Rick Santorum 0%, Unsure 5%
CBS News/YouGov Margin of error: ± 5.3% Sample size: 1252	December 14–17, 2015	Ted Cruz; 40%	Donald Trump; 31%	Marco Rubio; 12%	Ben Carson 6%, Jeb Bush 2%, Rand Paul 2%, Carly Fiorina 2%, Mike Huckabee 2%, Chris Christie 1%, John Kasich 1%, Rick Santorum 1%, Lindsey Graham 0%, Jim Gilmore 0%, George Pataki 0%, No preference 0%
Public Policy Polling Margin of error: ± 4.3% Sample size: 522	December 10–13, 2015	Donald Trump; 28%	Ted Cruz; 25%	Marco Rubio; 14%	Ben Carson 10%, Jeb Bush 7%, Carly Fiorina 3%, Chris Christie 3%, Mike Huckabee 3%, Rand Paul 2%, John Kasich 2%, Rick Santorum 1%, Lindsey Graham 1%, Jim Gilmore 0%, George Pataki 0%, Undecided 1%
Quinnipiac University Margin of error: ± 3.3% Sample size: 874	December 4–13, 2015	Donald Trump; 28%	Ted Cruz; 27%	Marco Rubio; 14%	Ben Carson 10%, Jeb Bush 5%, Rand Paul 4%, Carly Fiorina 3%, Chris Christie 3%, Mike Huckabee 1%, John Kasich 1%, Rick Santorum 0%, George Pataki 0%, Jim Gilmore 0%, Lindsey Graham 0%, DK 3%
Loras College Margin of error: ± 4.4% Sample size: 499	December 7–10, 2015	Ted Cruz; 29.7%	Donald Trump; 23.4%	Ben Carson; 10.8%	Marco Rubio 10.6%, Jeb Bush 6.2%, Carly Fiorina 3.4%, Rand Paul 2.4%, Mike Huckabee 1.8%, John Kasich 1.0%, Rick Santorum 1.0%, Chris Christie 0.4%, Lindsey Graham 0.0%, Undecided 9.0%
Fox News Margin of error: ± 4.5% Sample size: 450	December 7–10, 2015	Ted Cruz; 28%	Donald Trump; 26%	Marco Rubio; 13%	Ben Carson 10%, Jeb Bush 5%, Rand Paul 5%, Chris Christie 2%, Carly Fiorina 2%, Mike Huckabee 1%, John Kasich 1%, Rick Santorum 1%, George Pataki 1%, Jim Gilmore 0%, Lindsey Graham 0%, Uncommitted 1%, Other 1%, DK 3%
DMR/Bloomberg Margin of error: ± 4.9% Sample size: 400	December 7–10, 2015	Ted Cruz; 31%	Donald Trump; 21%	Ben Carson; 13%	Marco Rubio 10%, Jeb Bush 6%, Chris Christie 3%, Mike Huckabee 3%, Rand Paul 3%, John Kasich 2%, Carly Fiorina 1%, Rick Santorum 1%, Jim Gilmore 0%, Lindsey Graham 0%, George Pataki 0%, Uncommitted 3%, Undecided 4%
Monmouth University Margin of error: ± 4.8% Sample size: 425	December 3–6, 2015	Ted Cruz; 24%	Donald Trump; 19%	Marco Rubio; 17%	Ben Carson 13%, Jeb Bush 6%, Rand Paul 4%, Carly Fiorina 3%, John Kasich 3%, Chris Christie 2%, Mike Huckabee 2%, Rick Santorum 1%, Lindsey Graham <1%, George Pataki 0%, Jim Gilmore 0%, Uncommitted 1%, Undecided 4%
CNN/ORC Margin of error: ± 4.5% Sample size: 552	November 28- December 6, 2015	Donald Trump; 33%	Ted Cruz; 20%	Ben Carson; 16%	Marco Rubio 11%, Jeb Bush 4%, Carly Fiorina 3%, Rand Paul 3%, Chris Christie 2%, Mike Huckabee 2%, John Kasich 1%, Rick Santorum 1%, Lindsey Graham 0%, George Pataki 0%, Jim Gilmore 0%, No one 1%, Someone else 1%, No opinion 1%
Quinnipiac University Margin of error: ± 4.0% Sample size: 600	November 16–22, 2015	Donald Trump; 25%	Ted Cruz; 23%	Ben Carson; 18%	Marco Rubio 13%, Rand Paul 5%, Jeb Bush 4%, Carly Fiorina 3%, Chris Christie 2%, Rick Santorum 2%, Mike Huckabee 2%, John Kasich 1%, George Pataki 0%, Lindsey Graham 0%, Jim Gilmore 0%, DK/NA 2%
CBS News/YouGov Margin of error: ± 6.2% Sample size: ?	November 15–19, 2015	Donald Trump; 30%	Ted Cruz; 21%	Ben Carson; 19%	Marco Rubio 11%, Jeb Bush 5%, Carly Fiorina 4%, Chris Christie 2%, Rand Paul 2%, Rick Santorum 2%, Bobby Jindal 2%, John Kasich 1%, Mike Huckabee 1%, George Pataki 0%, Lindsey Graham 0%, Jim Gilmore 0%
Iowa State University/WHO-HD Margin of error: ± ? Sample size: 518	November 2–15, 2015	Ben Carson; 27%	Marco Rubio; 17%	Donald Trump; 15%	Ted Cruz 9%, Jeb Bush 5%, Rand Paul 3%, Carly Fiorina 2%, Mike Huckabee 1%, John Kasich 1%, Chris Christie 0%, Rick Santorum 0%, Lindsey Graham 0%
CNN/ORC Margin of error: ± 4.0% Sample size: 548	October 29 – November 4, 2015	Donald Trump; 25%	Ben Carson; 23%	Marco Rubio; 13%	Ted Cruz 11%, Jeb Bush 5%, Carly Fiorina 4%, Bobby Jindal 4%, Chris Christie 3%, Lindsey Graham 2%, John Kasich 2%, Rand Paul 2%, Mike Huckabee 2%, Rick Santorum 0%, George Pataki 0%, Jim Gilmore 0%, No opinion 3%
Gravis Marketing/One America News Network Margin of error: ± 5.0% Sample size: 356	October 30 – November 2, 2015	Donald Trump; 29.4%	Ben Carson; 22.4%	Marco Rubio; 18.0%	Ted Cruz 8.5%, Jeb Bush 6.0%, Carly Fiorina 5.2%, John Kasich 3.1%, Chris Christie 2.4%, Rand Paul 1.8%, Bobby Jindal 1.5%, Mike Huckabee 1.1%, Rick Santorum 0.4%, Lindsey Graham 0.3%
Public Policy Polling Margin of error: ± 3.9% Sample size: 638	October 30 – November 1, 2015	Donald Trump; 22%	Ben Carson; 21%	Ted Cruz; 14%	Marco Rubio 10%, Bobby Jindal 6%, Mike Huckabee 6%, Jeb Bush 5%, Carly Fiorina 5%, Chris Christie 3%, Rick Santorum 2%, John Kasich 2%, Rand Paul 2%, Lindsey Graham 0%, George Pataki 0%, Jim Gilmore 0%, Undecided 1%
KBUR/Monmouth University Margin of error: ± 3.37% Sample size: 874	October 29–31, 2015	Ben Carson; 27.5%	Donald Trump; 20.4%	Ted Cruz; 15.1%	Marco Rubio 10.1%, Jeb Bush 9.0%, Carly Fiorina 4.1%, Lindsey Graham 0.2%, Mike Huckabee 1.7%, John Kasich 1.9%, Rand Paul 1.6%, Chris Christie 2.3%, Bobby Jindal 1.3%, Rick Santorum 0.7%, Jim Gilmore 0.3%, George Pataki 0%, Undecided 3.8%
Monmouth University Margin of error: ± 4.9% Sample size: 400	October 22–25, 2015	Ben Carson; 32%	Donald Trump; 18%	Ted Cruz; 10%	Marco Rubio 10%, Jeb Bush 8%, Carly Fiorina 5%, Rand Paul 3%, Bobby Jindal 2%, Mike Huckabee 2%, John Kasich 2%, Rick Santorum 1%, Chris Christie 1%, Lindsey Graham 0%, George Pataki 0%, Jim Gilmore 0%, Other 0%, Uncommitted 1%, Undecided 5%
Loras College Margin of error: ± 4.4% Sample size: 500	October 19–22, 2015	Ben Carson; 30.6%	Donald Trump; 18.6%	Marco Rubio; 10.0%	Jeb Bush 6.8%, Ted Cruz 6.2%, Bobby Jindal 4.6%, Carly Fiorina 2.4%, Chris Christie 1.8%, Rand Paul 1.8%, John Kasich 1.4%, Mike Huckabee 1.2%, Rick Santorum 0.8%, Lindsey Graham 0.4%, George Pataki 0%, Undecided 12.8%
CBS News/YouGov Margin of error: ± 6.5% Sample size: ?	October 15–22, 2015	Donald Trump; 27%	Ben Carson; 27%	Ted Cruz; 12%	Marco Rubio 9%, Jeb Bush 6%, Carly Fiorina 3%, Rand Paul 3%, Mike Huckabee 2%, John Kasich 2%, Bobby Jindal 2%, Rick Santorum 2%, Chris Christie 1%, Lindsey Graham 0%, George Pataki 0%, Jim Gilmore 0%, No preference 3%
DMR/Bloomberg Margin of error: ± 4.9% Sample size: 401	October 16–21, 2015	Ben Carson; 28%	Donald Trump; 19%	Ted Cruz; 10%	Marco Rubio 9%, Rand Paul 5%, Jeb Bush 5%, Carly Fiorina 4%, Mike Huckabee 3%, John Kasich 2%, Bobby Jindal 2%, Rick Santorum 2%, Chris Christie 1%, Lindsey Graham 0%, George Pataki 0%, Jim Gilmore 0%, Not sure 7%, Uncommitted 3%
Quinnipiac University Margin of error: ± 4.1% Sample size: 574	October 14–20, 2015	Ben Carson; 28%	Donald Trump; 20%	Marco Rubio; 13%	Ted Cruz 10%, Rand Paul 6%, Carly Fiorina 5%, Jeb Bush 5%, John Kasich 3%, Bobby Jindal 3%, Mike Huckabee 2%, Chris Christie 1%, Rick Santorum 1%, Lindsey Graham 0%, George Pataki 0%, Jim Gilmore 0%, Undecided 3%
NBC/WSJ Margin of error: ± 4.7% Sample size: 431	October 2015	Donald Trump; 24%	Ben Carson; 19%	Carly Fiorina; 8%	Jeb Bush 7%, Ted Cruz 6%, Marco Rubio 6%, Bobby Jindal 6%, Mike Huckabee 5%, Rand Paul 4%, Chris Christie 4%, John Kasich 3%, Rick Santorum 1%, Lindsey Graham 1%, George Pataki <1%, Jim Gilmore <1%, Undecided 7%
Gravis Marketing Margin of error: ± 4.6% Sample size: 454	October 2, 2015	Donald Trump; 18.8%	Ben Carson; 14.1%	Ted Cruz; 10.6%	Carly Fiorina 9.7%, Marco Rubio 8.9%, Jeb Bush 6.9%, John Kasich 2.6%, Rand Paul 2.4%, Mike Huckabee 1.8%, Lindsey Graham 1.8%, Bobby Jindal 1.7%, Chris Christie 1.4%, Rick Santorum 1.3%, George Pataki 0.3%, Unsure 17.9%
Public Policy Polling Margin of error: ± 4.4% Sample size: 488	September 18–20, 2015	Donald Trump; 24%	Ben Carson; 17%	Carly Fiorina; 13%	Ted Cruz 8%, Marco Rubio 8%, Mike Huckabee 6%, Jeb Bush 6%, Scott Walker 5%, Rand Paul 4%, Bobby Jindal 4%, John Kasich 2%, Chris Christie 1%, Rick Santorum 1%, George Pataki 0%, Jim Gilmore 0%, Lindsey Graham 0%, Undecided 3%
CBS News/YouGov Margin of error: ± 5.7% Sample size: 705	September 3–10, 2015	Donald Trump; 29%	Ben Carson; 25%	Ted Cruz; 10%	Marco Rubio 6%, Scott Walker 5%, Carly Fiorina 4%, Mike Huckabee 4%, Rick Santorum 3%, Jeb Bush 3%, Bobby Jindal 2%, John Kasich 2%, Rand Paul 2%, Chris Christie 1%, Jim Gilmore 1%, Lindsey Graham 0%, George Pataki 0%, Rick Perry 0%, No preference 4%
Quinnipiac University Margin of error: ± 3.0% Sample size: 1038	August 27 – September 8, 2015	Donald Trump; 27%	Ben Carson; 21%	Ted Cruz; 9%	Jeb Bush 6%, Carly Fiorina 5%, Marco Rubio 5%, John Kasich 5%, Rand Paul 4%, Mike Huckabee 4%, Scott Walker 3%, Bobby Jindal 2%, Chris Christie 1%, Rick Santorum 1%, Rick Perry 1%, Lindsey Graham 1%, George Pataki 0%, Jim Gilmore 0%, Undecided 4%
NBC News/Marist Margin of error: ± 5.0% Sample size: 390	August 26 – September 2, 2015	Donald Trump; 29%	Ben Carson; 22%	Jeb Bush; 6%	Carly Fiorina 5%, Rand Paul 5%, Scott Walker 5%, Ted Cruz 4%, Marco Rubio 4%, Bobby Jindal 4%, Mike Huckabee 3%, Chris Christie 2%, John Kasich 2%, Rick Santorum 1%, Rick Perry 0%, Lindsey Graham 0%, George Pataki 0%, Jim Gilmore 0%, Undecided 8%
Gravis Marketing/One America Margin of error: ± 4.4% Sample size: 507	August 29–31, 2015	Donald Trump; 31.7%	Ben Carson; 15.8%	Ted Cruz; 6.9%	Marco Rubio 5.8%, Scott Walker 5.6%, Bobby Jindal 5.2%, Carly Fiorina 4.6%, Jeb Bush 4.1%, Mike Huckabee 2.6%, Chris Christie 2.0%, John Kasich 1.4%, Rand Paul 1.3%, Rick Perry 0.9%, Rick Santorum 0.6%, Lindsey Graham 0.4%, George Pataki 0.1%, Undecided 10.9%
Monmouth University Margin of error: ± 4.9% Sample size: 405	August 27–30, 2015	Donald Trump; 23%	Ben Carson; 23%	Carly Fiorina; 10%	Ted Cruz 9%, Scott Walker 7%, Jeb Bush 5%, John Kasich 4%, Marco Rubio 4%, Rand Paul 3%, Rick Santorum 2%, Bobby Jindal 1%, Chris Christie 1%, Rick Perry 1%, George Pataki 0%, Jim Gilmore 0%, Lindsey Graham 0%, Someone else 0%, Undecided 5%
Des Moines Register/Bloomberg/Selzer Margin of error: ± 4.9% Sample size: 400	August 23–26, 2015	Donald Trump; 23%	Ben Carson; 18%	Ted Cruz; 8%	Scott Walker 8%, Jeb Bush 6%, Marco Rubio 6%, Carly Fiorina 5%, Mike Huckabee 4%, Rand Paul 4%, Chris Christie 2%, Bobby Jindal 2%, John Kasich 2%, Rick Perry 1%, Rick Santorum 1%, George Pataki 0%, Jim Gilmore 0%, Lindsey Graham 0%, Someone else 0%, Undecided 10%
CNN/ORC Margin of error: ± 2% Sample size: 2,014	August 7–11, 2015	Donald Trump; 22%	Ben Carson; 14%	Scott Walker; 9%	Ted Cruz 8%, Carly Fiorina 7%, Mike Huckabee 7%, Jeb Bush 5%, Rand Paul 5%, Marco Rubio 5%, Chris Christie 3%, Lindsey Graham 2%, Bobby Jindal 2%, John Kasich 2%, Rick Perry 1%, Rick Santorum 1%, George Pataki 0%, Jim Gilmore 0%, Someone else 0%, No one 2%, No opinion 4%
NBC/Marist Margin of error: ± 5.3% Sample size: 342	July 14–21, 2015	Scott Walker; 19%	Donald Trump; 17%	Jeb Bush; 12%	Ben Carson 8%, Mike Huckabee 7%, Rand Paul 5%, Ted Cruz 4%, Marco Rubio 4%, Rick Perry 3%, Chris Christie 2%, John Kasich 2%, Bobby Jindal 1%, Carly Fiorina 1%, Lindsey Graham 1%, Rick Santorum 0%, George Pataki 0%, Jim Gilmore 0%, Undecided 14%
Quinnipiac University Margin of error: ± 3.8% Sample size: 666	June 20–29, 2015	Scott Walker; 18%	Ben Carson; 10%	Donald Trump; 10%	Ted Cruz 9%, Rand Paul 9%, Jeb Bush 8%, Marco Rubio 7%, Mike Huckabee 5%, Rick Perry 4%, Rick Santorum 4%, Carly Fiorina 3%, Bobby Jindal 3%, John Kasich 2%, Chris Christie 1%, Lindsey Graham 1%, George Pataki 0%, DK/NA 5%
Morning Consult Margin of error: ± ?% Sample size: 265	May 31 – June 8, 2015	Scott Walker; 18%	Jeb Bush; 10%	Mike Huckabee; 10%	Rand Paul 10%, Marco Rubio 7%, Chris Christie 6%, Ben Carson 5%, Donald Trump 5%, Ted Cruz 4%, Carly Fiorina 2%, Don't know/No opinion/Refused 21%, Someone else 3%
Gravis Marketing Margin of error: ± 5% Sample size: 364	May 28–29, 2015	Scott Walker; 17%	Marco Rubio; 13%	Ben Carson; 12%	Jeb Bush 10%, Mike Huckabee 8%, Ted Cruz 6%, Rick Santorum 6%, Carly Fiorina 5%, Chris Christie 4%, Rand Paul 4%, Unsure 15%
Des Moines Register Margin of error: ± 4.9% Sample size: 402	May 25–29, 2015	Scott Walker; 17%	Ben Carson; 10%	Rand Paul; 10%	Jeb Bush 9%, Mike Huckabee 9%, Marco Rubio 6%, Rick Santorum 6%, Ted Cruz 5%, Chris Christie 4%, Donald Trump 4%, Rick Perry 3%, Carly Fiorina 2%, John Kasich 2%, Lindsey Graham 1%, Bobby Jindal 1%, Uncommitted 4%, Not sure 7%
Quinnipiac University Margin of error: ± 3.8% Sample size: 667	April 25 – May 4, 2015	Scott Walker; 21%	Rand Paul; 13%	Marco Rubio; 13%	Ted Cruz 12%, Mike Huckabee 11%, Ben Carson 7%, Jeb Bush 5%, Chris Christie 3%, Rick Perry 3%, Carly Fiorina 2%, John Kasich 2%, Rick Santorum 2%, Bobby Jindal 1%, Lindsey Graham 0%, Don't know/No answer 6%
Public Policy Polling Margin of error: ± 4.6% Sample size: 462	April 23–26, 2015	Scott Walker; 23%	Marco Rubio; 13%	Jeb Bush; 12%	Mike Huckabee 10%, Rand Paul 10%, Ted Cruz 8%, Ben Carson 7%, Chris Christie 5%, Rick Perry 4%, Undecided 8%
Loras College Margin of error: ± 4.3% Sample size: 509	April 21–23, 2015	Scott Walker; 12.6%	Marco Rubio; 10%	Jeb Bush; 9.6%	Mike Huckabee 8.6%, Ted Cruz 6.5%, Ben Carson 6.3%, Rand Paul 6.3%, Chris Christie 5.1%, Rick Santorum 3.5%, Donald Trump 3.1%, Rick Perry 2.6%, Carly Fiorina 1%, Bobby Jindal 1%, John Kasich 1%, Lindsey Graham 0%, Undecided 22.8%
Gravis Marketing Margin of error: ± 5% Sample size: 388	April 13, 2015	Jeb Bush; 16%	Scott Walker; 13%	Marco Rubio; 12%	Ben Carson 9%, Rand Paul 9%, Mike Huckabee 8%, Ted Cruz 6%, Chris Christie 5%, Carly Fiorina 3%, Rick Santorum 2%, Undecided 17%
Opinion Savvy Margin of error: ± 4.16% Sample size: 552	March 20, 2015	Scott Walker; 29%	Ben Carson; 14%	Jeb Bush; 12%	Mike Huckabee 11%, Ted Cruz 7%, Chris Christie 5%, Rand Paul 5%, Marco Rubio 5%, Donald Trump 3%, Other/Undecided 10%
Quinnipiac University Margin of error: ± 3.9% Sample size: 623	February 16–23, 2015	Scott Walker; 25%	Rand Paul; 13%	Ben Carson; 11%	Mike Huckabee 11%, Jeb Bush 10%, Ted Cruz 5%, Marco Rubio 4%, Chris Christie 4%, Rick Santorum 4%, Rick Perry 3%, Bobby Jindal 2%, John Kasich 0%, Unsure 9%
Gravis Marketing Margin of error: ± 4% Sample size: 343	February 12–13, 2015	Scott Walker; 24%	Jeb Bush; 10%	Rand Paul; 10%	Chris Christie 9%, Mike Huckabee 7%, Marco Rubio 7%, Rick Santorum 6%, Ben Carson 5%, Ted Cruz 4%, Carly Fiorina 3%, Unsure 15%
NBC News/Marist Margin of error: ± 5.5% Sample size: 320	February 3–10, 2015	Mike Huckabee; 17%	Jeb Bush; 16%	Scott Walker; 15%	Chris Christie 9%, Rand Paul 7%, Ben Carson 6%, Marco Rubio 6%, Rick Santorum 5%, Rick Perry 4%, Ted Cruz 2%, Lindsey Graham 1%, Undecided 14%
Selzer & Co. Margin of error: ± 4.9% Sample size: 402	January 26–29, 2015	Scott Walker; 15%	Rand Paul; 14%	Mitt Romney; 13%	Mike Huckabee 10%, Ben Carson 9%, Jeb Bush 8%, Ted Cruz 5%, Chris Christie 4%, Rick Santorum 4%, Marco Rubio 3%, Rick Perry 3%, Bobby Jindal 2%, Carly Fiorina 1%, John Kasich 1%, Donald Trump 1%, Mike Pence 0%, Uncommitted 2%, Not sure 5%
Selzer & Co. Margin of error: ± 4.9% Sample size: 402	January 26–29, 2015	Scott Walker; 16%	Rand Paul; 15%	Mike Huckabee; 13%	Ben Carson 10%, Jeb Bush 9%, Chris Christie 6%, Ted Cruz 6%, Rick Santorum 5%, Marco Rubio 4%, Rick Perry 3%, Bobby Jindal 2%, Carly Fiorina 1%, John Kasich 1%, Donald Trump 1%, Mike Pence 0%, Uncommitted 3%, Not sure 5%
Loras College Margin of error: ± 5.5% Sample size: 316	January 21–26, 2015	Mitt Romney; 13.7%	Mike Huckabee; 12.5%	Ben Carson; 10.5%	Jeb Bush 9.9%, Scott Walker 8.3%, Rand Paul 6.7%, Ted Cruz 5.1%, Marco Rubio 4.2%, Chris Christie 3.8%, Rick Santorum 3.8%, Rick Perry 2.9%, Bobby Jindal 1.6%, Carly Fiorina 1%, John Kasich 1%, Lindsey Graham 0.3% Undecided 14.7%
Loras College Margin of error: ± 5.5% Sample size: 316	January 21–26, 2015	Mike Huckabee; 14.4%	Jeb Bush; 13.1%	Ben Carson; 12.8%	Scott Walker 9.9%, Rand Paul 7%, Chris Christie 5.4%, Ted Cruz 5.4%, Marco Rubio 4.2%, Rick Santorum 3.8%, Rick Perry 3.2%, Bobby Jindal 1.6%, Carly Fiorina 1.3%, John Kasich 1.3%, Lindsey Graham 0.6% Undecided 16%
Gravis Marketing Margin of error: ± 3% Sample size: 404	January 5–7, 2015	Mitt Romney; 21%	Jeb Bush; 14%	Scott Walker; 10%	Mike Huckabee 9%, Rand Paul 8%, Ted Cruz 7%, Chris Christie 5%, Paul Ryan 5%, Marco Rubio 4%, Undecided 18%

Polls in 2014

Poll source	Date	1st	2nd	3rd	Other
Fox News Margin of error: ± 5% Sample size: 329	October 28–30, 2014	Mike Huckabee; 13%	Ben Carson; 12%	Paul Ryan; 9%	Jeb Bush 8%, Rand Paul 8%, Chris Christie 7%, Ted Cruz 7%, Rick Santorum 6%, Marco Rubio 5%, Scott Walker 5%, Rick Perry 3%, Bobby Jindal 1%, John Kasich 1%, Rob Portman 0%, Other 1%, None of the above 4%, Don't know 10%
Reuters/Ipsos Margin of error: ± 4.0% Sample size: 602	October 23–29, 2014	Mitt Romney; 17%	Paul Ryan; 13%	Chris Christie; 12%	Jeb Bush 10%, Scott Walker 10%, Rand Paul 8%, Ted Cruz 7%, Marco Rubio 6%, Rick Santorum 6%, Rick Perry 5%, Wouldn't vote 7%
Selzer & Co. Margin of error: ± 4.8% Sample size: 425	October 1–7, 2014	Mitt Romney; 17%	Ben Carson; 11%	Rand Paul; 10%	Mike Huckabee 9%, Paul Ryan 8%, Ted Cruz 7%, Rick Perry 7%, Chris Christie 6%, Jeb Bush 4%, Scott Walker 4%, Rick Santorum 3%, Marco Rubio 2%, Bobby Jindal 1%, John Kasich 1%, Mike Pence 0%, Rob Portman 0%, Uncommitted 1%, Not sure 9%
CNN/ORC Margin of error: ± 5.5% Sample size: 310	September 8–10, 2014	Mike Huckabee; 21%	Paul Ryan; 12%	Rand Paul; 7%	Jeb Bush 6%, Chris Christie 6%, Rick Perry 5%, Marco Rubio 5%, Scott Walker 5%, Ted Cruz 4%, Bobby Jindal 4%, Rick Santorum 3%
Suffolk University Margin of error: ± 6.83% Sample size: 206	August 23–26, 2014	Mike Huckabee; 13.11%	Chris Christie; 10.68%	Rick Perry; 8.74%	Jeb Bush 7.28%, Rand Paul 6.8%, Paul Ryan 6.31%, Rick Santorum 5.83%, Marco Rubio 5.34%, Ted Cruz 4.85%, Scott Walker 4.37%, Bobby Jindal 2.91%, Jon Huntsman Jr. 0.97%, John Kasich 0.97%, Other 4.37%, Undecided 16.99%, Refused 0.49%
Suffolk University Margin of error: ± 6.83% Sample size: 206	August 23–26, 2014	Mitt Romney; 35.29%	Mike Huckabee; 8.82%	Chris Christie; 6.47%	Rick Santorum 5.88%, Ted Cruz 5.29%, Rand Paul 5.29%, Jeb Bush 4.71, Rick Perry 4.71%, Paul Ryan 4.12%, Scott Walker 3.53%, Marco Rubio 2.35%, Bobby Jindal 1.76%, Jon Huntsman Jr. 1.18%, John Kasich 0.59%, Undecided 10%
NBC News/Marist Margin of error: ± 4.1% Sample size: 558	July 7–13, 2014	Jeb Bush; 12%	Rand Paul; 12%	Paul Ryan; 11%	Rick Santorum 9%, Chris Christie 8%, Ted Cruz 7%, Rick Perry 7%, Marco Rubio 7%, Scott Walker 5%, Bobby Jindal 1%, Undecided 20%
Vox Populi Polling Margin of error: ± 6.6% Sample size: 222	June 4–5, 2014	Jeb Bush; 18%	Mike Huckabee; 15%	Paul Ryan; 13%	Rand Paul 12%, Marco Rubio 11%, Rick Santorum 10%, Ted Cruz 9%, Chris Christie 6%, Scott Walker 6%
Public Policy Polling Margin of error: ± 5.6% Sample size: 303	May 15–19, 2014	Mike Huckabee; 20%	Ted Cruz; 15%	Jeb Bush; 12%	Rand Paul 10%, Chris Christie 9%, Paul Ryan 8%, Scott Walker 6%, Marco Rubio 4%, Rick Santorum 3%, Someone else/Not sure 13%
The Daily Caller/Vox Populi Polling Margin of error: ± 8.4% Sample size: 168	April 22–24, 2014	Mike Huckabee; 20%	Paul Ryan; 19%	Jeb Bush; 18%	Ted Cruz 9%, Marco Rubio 9%, Rand Paul 8%, Chris Christie 7%, Scott Walker 6%, Joe Scarborough 4%
Magellan Strategies Margin of error: ± 5% Sample size: 330	April 14–15, 2014	Jeb Bush; 17%	Mike Huckabee; 17%	Chris Christie; 14%	Rand Paul 11%, Ted Cruz 10%, Scott Walker 8%, John Kasich 5%, Marco Rubio 2%, Undecided 16%
Loras College Margin of error: ± 4% Sample size: 600	April 7–8, 2014	Mike Huckabee; 14.7%	Jeb Bush; 10.7%	Rand Paul; 8.5%	Paul Ryan 8.3%, Chris Christie 8%, Ted Cruz 6.2%, Marco Rubio 4.7%, Rick Santorum 4.7%, Scott Walker 4.7%, Rick Perry 3%, John Kasich 0.7%, Other 0.7%, Undecided 23.8%
Suffolk University Margin of error: ± 8.7% Sample size: 127	April 3–8, 2014	Mike Huckabee; 11.02%	Jeb Bush; 10.24%	Rand Paul; 10.24%	Ted Cruz 9.45%, Ben Carson 8.66%, Chris Christie 7.09%, Paul Ryan 6.3%, Sarah Palin 5.51%, Condoleezza Rice 5.51%, Marco Rubio 5.51%, Rick Santorum 5.51%, Scott Walker 5.51%, Bobby Jindal 3.15%, Rick Perry 3.15%, Undecided 3.15%
WPA Research Margin of error: ± ? Sample size: 402	March 30, 2014	Mike Huckabee; 14%	Rand Paul; 10%	Scott Walker; 8%	Jeb Bush 7%, Ted Cruz 7%, Paul Ryan 7%, Chris Christie 6%, Rick Santorum 5%, Rick Perry 3%, Marco Rubio 3%, Bobby Jindal 2%, Other 2%, Undecided 26%
Public Policy Polling Margin of error: ± 5.8% Sample size: 283	February 20–23, 2014	Mike Huckabee; 17%	Rand Paul; 14%	Jeb Bush; 13%	Chris Christie 10%, Ted Cruz 10%, Paul Ryan 9%, Bobby Jindal 7%, Scott Walker 7%, Marco Rubio 3%, Other/Undecided 11%

Polls in 2013-2012

Poll source	Date	1st	2nd	3rd	Other
Cygnal Margin of error: ± 2.37% Sample size: 1,705	July 10–12, 2013	Marco Rubio; 11.4%	Rand Paul; 10.5%	Paul Ryan; 9.3%	Jeb Bush 8.7%, Chris Christie 7.7%, Rick Santorum 6.7%, Ted Cruz 6.1%, Scott Walker 2.1%, Bobby Jindal 1.3%, Undecided 36.3%
Public Policy Polling Margin of error: ± 6.2% Sample size: 250	July 5–7, 2013	Rand Paul; 18%	Chris Christie; 16%	Paul Ryan; 15%	Jeb Bush 14%, Marco Rubio 11%, Ted Cruz 10%, Rick Santorum 6%, Bobby Jindal 2%, Susana Martinez 1%, Other/Undecided 7%
Public Policy Polling Margin of error: ± 5.4% Sample size: 326	Feb. 1–3, 2013	Mike Huckabee; 16%	Marco Rubio; 16%	Rand Paul; 15%	Jeb Bush 14%, Chris Christie 12%, Paul Ryan 10%, Susana Martinez 4%, Bobby Jindal 3%, Rick Perry 3%, Someone Else/Undecided 7%
Public Policy Polling Margin of error: 5.1% Sample size: 363	July 12–15, 2012	Rick Santorum; 17%	Mike Huckabee; 17%	Chris Christie; 16%	Rand Paul 11%, Marco Rubio 10%, Jeb Bush 8%, Paul Ryan 6%, Sarah Palin 4%, Scott Walker 4%, Someone else/Not sure 8%
Public Policy Polling Margin of error: 5.3% Sample size: 346	May 3–5, 2012	Rick Santorum; 16%	Mike Huckabee; 16%	Chris Christie; 15%	Jeb Bush 10%, Sarah Palin 10%, Rand Paul 9%, Marco Rubio 7%, Paul Ryan 5% Someone else/Not sure 10%

== Results ==
Iowa Republican precinct caucuses, February 1, 2016
Candidate	Votes	Percentage	Actual delegate count		
Candidate	Votes	Percentage	Bound	Unbound	Total
Ted Cruz	51,666	27.64%	8	0	8
Donald Trump	45,427	24.3%	7	0	7
Marco Rubio	43,165	23.12%	7	0	7
Ben Carson	17,395	9.3%	3	0	3
Rand Paul	8,481	4.54%	1	0	1
Jeb Bush	5,238	2.8%	1	0	1
Carly Fiorina	3,485	1.86%	1	0	1
John Kasich	3,474	1.86%	1	0	1
Mike Huckabee	3,345	1.79%	1	0	1
Chris Christie	3,284	1.76%	0	0	0
Rick Santorum	1,783	0.95%	0	0	0
Other	117	0.06%	0	0	0
Jim Gilmore	12	0.01%	0	0	0
Unprojected delegates:			0	0	0
Total:	186,932	100.00%	30	0	30
Source: "Iowa". cnn.com.

=== Results by county ===
2016 Iowa Republican Presidential Caucuses (By County)
County	Ted Cruz		Donald Trump		Marco Rubio		Ben Carson		Rand Paul		Jeb Bush		Carly Fiorina		John Kasich		Mike Huckabee		All Other Candidates (Note: Consists of the vote totals for all candidates that did not receive delegates, which are: Chris Christie, Rick Santorum, Jim Gilmore, and any other write-ins or candidates.)		Total
County	#	%	#	%	#	%	#	%	#	%	#	%	#	%	#	%	#	%	#	%	Total
Adair	104	25.55%	104	25.55%	80	19.66%	61	14.99%	12	2.95%	4	0.98%	16	3.93%	2	0.49%	11	2.70%	13	3.20%	407
Adams	81	29.67%	68	24.91%	47	17.22%	30	10.99%	8	2.93%	7	2.56%	16	5.86%	10	3.66%	3	1.10%	3	1.10%	273
Allamakee	183	26.64%	193	28.09%	131	19.07%	77	11.21%	16	2.33%	11	1.60%	54	7.86%	2	0.29%	9	1.31%	11	1.60%	687
Appanoose	269	32.02%	292	34.76%	90	10.71%	92	10.95%	20	2.38%	13	1.55%	9	1.07%	4	0.48%	44	5.24%	7	0.84%	840
Audubon	135	36.10%	99	26.47%	56	14.97%	33	8.82%	11	2.94%	10	2.67%	4	1.07%	5	1.34%	20	5.35%	1	0.27%	374
Benton	596	36.45%	410	25.08%	246	15.05%	171	10.46%	72	4.40%	11	0.67%	35	2.14%	27	1.65%	34	2.08%	33	2.02%	1,635
Black Hawk	1,585	26.82%	1,360	23.01%	1,551	26.24%	497	8.41%	357	6.04%	178	3.01%	131	2.22%	53	0.90%	72	1.22%	126	2.13%	5,910
Boone	566	32.20%	412	23.44%	320	18.20%	177	10.07%	96	5.46%	31	1.76%	7	0.40%	22	1.25%	67	3.81%	60	3.42%	1,758
Bremer	408	27.38%	347	23.29%	389	26.11%	134	8.99%	46	3.09%	38	2.55%	24	1.61%	50	3.36%	19	1.28%	35	2.35%	1,490
Buchanan	308	36.80%	217	25.93%	110	13.14%	82	9.80%	35	4.18%	14	1.67%	31	3.70%	6	0.72%	15	1.79%	19	2.27%	837
Buena Vista	309	30.62%	251	24.88%	221	21.90%	97	9.61%	26	2.58%	23	2.28%	20	1.98%	15	0.49%	18	1.78%	29	2.87%	1,009
Butler	332	36.48%	220	24.18%	145	15.93%	108	11.87%	32	3.52%	24	2.64%	18	1.98%	3	0.33%	21	2.31%	7	0.77%	910
Calhoun	159	28.55%	136	24.42%	121	21.72%	37	6.64%	20	3.59%	10	1.80%	8	1.44%	7	1.26%	35	6.28%	24	4.31%	557
Carroll	256	24.95%	298	29.04%	230	22.42%	69	6.73%	31	3.02%	60	5.85%	44	4.29%	14	1.36%	11	1.07%	13	1.27%	1,026
Cass	225	24.35%	262	28.35%	176	19.05%	142	15.37%	9	0.97%	34	3.68%	10	1.08%	21	2.27%	17	1.84%	28	3.03%	924
Cedar	310	28.97%	281	26.26%	240	22.43%	100	9.35%	43	4.02%	17	1.59%	19	1.78%	26	2.43%	13	1.21%	21	1.96%	1,070
Cerro Gordo	655	28.17%	597	25.68%	446	19.18%	184	7.91%	78	3.35%	119	5.12%	42	1.81%	29	1.25%	39	1.68%	136	5.84%	2,325
Cherokee	157	18.71%	248	29.56%	243	28.96%	119	14.18%	12	1.43%	16	1.91%	11	1.31%	5	0.60%	17	2.03%	11	1.32%	839
Chickasaw	161	26.79%	166	27.62%	143	23.79%	57	9.48%	18	3.00%	11	1.83%	27	4.49%	3	0.50%	6	1.00%	9	1.50%	601
Clarke	155	27.83%	202	36.27%	88	15.80%	56	10.05%	15	2.69%	12	2.15%	9	1.62%	3	0.54%	8	1.44%	9	1.62%	557
Clay	291	28.39%	292	28.49%	149	14.54%	155	15.12%	28	2.73%	16	1.56%	8	0.78%	31	3.02%	25	2.44%	30	2.93%	1,025
Clayton	298	35.22%	249	29.43%	109	12.88%	67	7.92%	29	3.43%	26	3.07%	26	3.07%	11	1.30%	17	2.01%	14	1.65%	846
Clinton	621	26.93%	709	30.75%	459	19.90%	159	6.90%	94	4.08%	106	4.60%	70	3.04%	41	1.78%	15	0.65%	32	1.39%	2,306
Crawford	226	32.33%	214	30.62%	114	16.31%	63	9.01%	12	1.72%	12	1.72%	24	3.43%	8	1.14%	7	1.00%	19	2.72%	699
Dallas	1,691	23.22%	1,510	20.74%	2,469	33.91%	489	6.72%	276	3.79%	213	2.93%	133	1.83%	167	2.29%	61	0.84%	273	2.75%	7,282
Davis	168	31.64%	205	38.61%	37	6.97%	38	7.16%	25	4.71%	10	1.88%	1	0.19%	1	0.19%	38	7.16%	8	1.51%	531
Decatur	173	34.81%	127	25.55%	73	14.69%	80	16.10%	19	3.82%	5	1.01%	2	0.40%	4	0.80%	6	1.21%	8	1.60%	497
Delaware	317	35.46%	198	22.15%	172	19.24%	92	10.29%	27	3.02%	19	2.13%	52	5.82%	2	0.22%	7	0.78%	8	0.90%	894
Des Moines	613	28.30%	659	30.42%	451	20.82%	212	9.79%	99	4.57%	19	0.88%	17	0.78%	20	0.92%	31	1.43%	45	2.08%	2,166
Dickinson	260	21.63%	342	28.45%	286	23.79%	159	13.23%	34	2.83%	46	3.83%	12	1.00%	27	2.25%	15	1.75%	21	1.25%	1,202
Dubuque	824	20.73%	1,087	27.35%	1,060	26.67%	384	9.66%	230	5.79%	95	2.39%	97	2.44%	54	1.36%	48	1.21%	96	2.42%	3,975
Emmet	143	35.48%	122	30.27%	46	11.41%	49	12.16%	11	2.73%	4	0.99%	8	1.99%	4	0.99%	10	2.48%	6	1.49%	403
Fayette	341	34.10%	240	24.10%	180	18.00%	144	14.40%	27	2.70%	18	1.80%	18	1.80%	6	0.60%	17	1.70%	9	0.90%	1,000
Floyd	305	40.13%	200	26.32%	105	13.82%	83	10.92%	10	1.32%	23	3.03%	8	1.05%	9	1.18%	8	1.05%	9	1.18%	761
Franklin	225	35.83%	159	25.32%	105	16.72%	62	9.87%	23	3.66%	18	1.98%	5	0.80%	4	0.64%	23	3.66%	4	0.64%	628
Fremont	87	20.42%	182	42.72%	77	18.08%	40	9.39%	11	2.58%	10	2.35%	0	0.00%	6	1.41%	2	0.47%	11	2.58%	426
Greene	162	29.67%	164	30.04%	77	14.10%	62	11.36%	14	2.56%	25	4.58%	2	0.37%	6	1.10%	14	2.56%	20	3.66%	546
Grundy	272	28.75%	198	20.93%	261	27.59%	73	7.72%	32	3.38%	26	2.75%	10	1.27%	4	0.42%	50	5.29%	20	2.12%	946
Guthrie	218	28.91%	208	27.59%	118	15.65%	107	14.19%	28	3.71%	16	2.12%	18	2.39%	2	0.27%	23	3.05%	16	2.12%	754
Hamilton	277	28.94%	269	28.11%	159	16.61%	89	9.30%	48	5.02%	13	1.36%	14	1.46%	20	2.09%	25	2.61%	43	4.39%	957
Hancock	385	45.35%	360	18.85%	132	15.55%	71	8.36%	21	2.47%	22	2.59%	19	2.24%	6	0.71%	16	1.88%	17	2.00%	1,049
Hardin	417	32.83%	295	23.23%	225	17.72%	138	10.87%	45	3.54%	19	1.50%	25	1.97%	12	0.94%	31	2.44%	63	4.96%	1,270
Harrison	282	27.67%	315	30.91%	112	10.99%	221	21.69%	17	1.67%	5	0.49%	24	2.36%	10	0.98%	10	0.98%	23	2.26%	1,019
Henry	379	31.27%	273	22.52%	228	18.81%	189	15.59%	30	2.48%	31	2.56%	18	1.49%	12	0.99%	33	2.72%	19	1.57%	1,212
Howard	106	28.88%	112	30.52%	89	24.25%	26	7.08%	5	1.36%	19	5.18%	3	0.82%	0	0.00%	5	1.36%	2	0.54%	367
Humboldt	168	27.77%	204	33.72%	111	18.35%	48	7.93%	16	2.64%	14	2.31%	6	0.99%	3	0.50%	17	2.81%	18	2.98%	605
Ida	135	25.62%	136	25.81%	135	25.62%	43	8.16%	7	1.33%	8	1.52%	32	6.07%	3	0.57%	8	1.52%	20	3.74%	527
Iowa	353	34.17%	249	24.10%	163	15.78%	105	10.16%	56	5.42%	11	1.06%	25	2.42%	14	1.36%	33	3.19%	24	2.32%	1,033
Jackson	265	28.49%	306	32.90%	169	18.17%	64	6.88%	34	3.66%	26	2.80%	21	2.26%	11	1.18%	9	0.97%	25	2.70%	930
Jasper	812	34.94%	583	25.09%	417	17.94%	207	8.91%	100	4.30%	46	1.98%	31	1.33%	13	0.56%	72	3.10%	43	1.85%	2,324
Jefferson	270	31.69%	223	26.17%	104	12.21%	55	6.46%	67	7.86%	17	2.00%	11	1.29%	25	2.93%	51	5.99%	29	3.40%	852
Johnson	1,413	19.55%	1,394	19.29%	2,207	30.54%	531	7.35%	691	9.56%	229	3.17%	191	2.64%	284	3.93%	75	1.04%	212	2.93%	7,227
Jones	363	35.11%	258	24.95%	167	16.15%	107	10.35%	32	3.09%	25	2.42%	35	3.38%	6	0.58%	6	0.58%	35	3.38%	1,034
Keokuk	216	30.77%	220	31.34%	116	16.52%	63	8.97%	19	2.71%	13	1.85%	11	1.57%	5	0.71%	23	3.28%	16	2.27%	702
Kossuth	285	30.10%	224	23.65%	190	20.06%	150	15.84%	18	1.90%	13	1.37%	4	0.42%	15	1.58%	27	2.85%	21	2.27%	947
Lee	334	25.30%	409	30.98%	249	18.86%	157	11.89%	36	2.73%	19	1.44%	51	3.86%	16	1.21%	26	1.97%	23	1.74%	1,320
Linn	3,422	29.43%	2,344	20.16%	2,825	24.29%	1,072	9.22%	699	6.01%	262	2.25%	302	2.60%	262	2.25%	99	0.85%	341	2.93%	11,628
Louisa	257	35.50%	261	36.05%	76	10.50%	44	6.08%	26	3.59%	14	1.93%	5	0.69%	5	0.69%	31	4.28%	5	0.69%	724
Lucas	213	36.16%	159	26.99%	79	13.41%	68	11.54%	24	4.07%	10	1.70%	9	1.53%	0	0.00%	18	3.06%	9	1.53%	589
Lyon	432	39.02%	173	15.63%	229	20.69%	206	18.61%	14	1.26%	11	0.99%	10	0.90%	6	0.54%	3	0.27%	23	2.08%	1,107
Madison	452	33.51%	373	27.65%	250	18.53%	107	7.93%	51	3.78%	22	1.63%	21	1.56%	11	0.82%	34	2.52%	28	2.07%	1,349
Mahaska	669	34.13%	421	21.48%	368	18.78%	209	10.66%	69	3.52%	40	2.04%	37	1.89%	8	0.41%	49	2.50%	90	4.59%	1,960
Marion	1,011	35.20%	539	18.77%	606	21.10%	272	9.47%	123	4.28%	74	2.58%	41	1.43%	30	1.04%	74	2.58%	102	3.55%	2,872
Marshall	630	27.07%	608	26.13%	502	21.57%	226	9.71%	75	3.22%	61	2.62%	57	2.45%	33	1.42%	50	2.15%	85	3.65%	2,327
Mills	244	21.77%	300	26.76%	265	23.64%	182	16.24%	33	2.94%	10	0.89%	23	2.05%	15	1.34%	7	0.62%	42	3.75%	1,121
Mitchell	114	24.20%	120	25.48%	56	11.89%	61	12.95%	34	7.22%	10	2.12%	55	11.68%	3	0.64%	11	2.34%	7	1.49%	471
Monona	185	36.13%	156	30.47%	94	18.36%	41	8.01%	8	1.56%	2	0.39%	6	1.17%	1	0.20%	9	1.76%	10	1.95%	512
Monroe	195	36.04%	170	31.42%	97	17.93%	25	4.62%	23	4.25%	3	0.55%	4	0.74%	4	0.74%	18	3.33%	2	0.37%	541
Montgomery	133	23.29%	118	20.67%	124	21.72%	85	14.89%	26	4.55%	27	4.73%	27	4.73%	10	1.75%	10	1.75%	11	1.93%	571
Muscatine	576	23.86%	720	29.83%	635	26.30%	110	4.56%	131	5.43%	53	2.20%	43	1.78%	45	1.86%	39	1.62%	62	2.57%	2,414
O'Brien	347	28.47%	256	21.00%	281	23.05%	220	18.05%	19	1.56%	17	1.39%	10	0.82%	6	0.49%	45	3.69%	18	1.48%	1,219
Osceola	113	34.56%	78	23.85%	56	17.13%	42	12.84%	8	2.45%	13	3.98%	7	2.14%	1	0.31%	3	0.92%	6	1.84%	327
Page	249	28.52%	232	26.58%	156	17.87%	157	17.98%	13	1.49%	25	2.86%	8	0.92%	12	1.37%	9	1.03%	12	1.37%	873
Palo Alto	110	25.46%	117	27.08%	94	21.76%	40	9.26%	15	3.47%	14	3.24%	9	2.08%	5	1.16%	17	3.94%	11	2.55%	432
Plymouth	530	28.10%	618	32.77%	373	19.78%	195	10.34%	34	1.80%	44	2.33%	19	1.01%	22	1.17%	14	0.74%	37	1.97%	1,886
Pocahontas	187	38.72%	110	22.77%	65	13.46%	70	14.49%	13	2.69%	9	1.86%	5	1.04%	2	0.41%	16	3.31%	6	1.25%	483
Polk	7,864	25.29%	6,764	21.75%	8,365	26.90%	2,297	7.39%	1,633	5.25%	1,405	4.52%	420	1.35%	773	2.49%	565	1.82%	1,012	3.26%	31,098
Pottawattamie	942	21.54%	1,508	34.48%	750	17.15%	543	12.42%	156	3.57%	70	1.60%	80	1.83%	127	2.90%	25	0.57%	172	3.93%	4,373
Poweshiek	282	28.69%	258	26.25%	183	18.62%	76	7.73%	63	6.41%	38	3.87%	14	1.42%	18	1.83%	30	3.05%	21	2.13%	983
Ringgold	84	25.30%	106	31.93%	50	15.06%	52	15.66%	2	0.60%	16	4.82%	3	0.90%	0	0.00%	14	4.22%	5	1.50%	332
Sac	187	27.95%	212	31.69%	81	12.11%	61	9.12%	17	2.54%	19	2.84%	12	1.79%	7	1.05%	18	2.69%	55	8.22%	669
Scott	2,396	24.58%	2,465	25.28%	2,553	26.19%	532	5.46%	486	4.99%	353	3.62%	219	2.25%	436	4.47%	78	0.80%	231	2.37%	9,749
Shelby	207	27.79%	203	27.25%	129	17.32%	109	14.63%	23	3.09%	9	1.21%	22	2.95%	9	1.21%	18	2.42%	16	3.23%	745
Sioux	1,524	33.17%	502	10.93%	1,469	31.98%	686	14.93%	117	2.55%	76	1.65%	39	0.85%	45	0.98%	35	0.76%	101	2.20%	4,594
Story	1,815	24.09%	1,152	15.29%	2,415	32.05%	641	8.51%	629	8.35%	212	2.81%	117	1.55%	193	2.56%	123	1.63%	237	3.14%	7,534
Tama	307	31.23%	350	35.61%	123	12.51%	83	8.44%	27	2.75%	12	1.22%	10	1.02%	12	1.22%	33	3.36%	26	2.65%	983
Taylor	74	19.58%	140	37.04%	52	13.76%	63	16.67%	10	2.65%	10	2.65%	6	1.59%	6	1.59%	9	2.38%	8	2.11%	378
Union	203	28.92%	194	27.64%	135	19.23%	87	12.39%	10	1.42%	12	1.71%	16	2.28%	7	1.00%	28	3.99%	10	1.42%	702
Van Buren	196	36.77%	151	28.33%	63	11.82%	56	10.51%	7	1.31%	3	0.56%	0	0.00%	1	0.19%	51	9.57%	5	0.94%	533
Wapello	489	29.30%	592	35.47%	242	14.50%	127	7.61%	50	3.00%	24	1.44%	10	0.60%	9	0.54%	103	6.17%	23	1.38%	1,669
Warren	1,120	29.40%	982	25.78%	784	20.58%	374	9.82%	197	5.17%	95	2.49%	37	0.97%	44	1.16%	76	2.00%	100	2.63%	3,809
Washington	542	35.10%	329	21.31%	222	14.38%	194	12.56%	104	6.74%	63	4.08%	30	1.94%	13	0.84%	23	1.49%	24	1.55%	1,544
Wayne	171	40.81%	114	27.21%	57	13.60%	36	8.59%	3	0.72%	9	2.15%	5	1.19%	7	1.67%	15	3.58%	2	0.48%	419
Webster	432	26.65%	435	26.84%	286	17.64%	120	7.40%	62	3.82%	44	2.71%	17	1.05%	28	1.73%	76	4.69%	121	7.46%	1,621
Winnebago	187	30.31%	115	18.64%	128	20.75%	91	14.75%	22	3.57%	24	3.89%	7	1.13%	2	0.32%	27	4.38%	14	2.27%	617
Winneshiek	251	24.04%	274	26.25%	208	19.92%	151	14.46%	40	3.83%	26	2.49%	27	2.59%	30	2.87%	23	2.20%	14	1.34%	1,044
Woodbury	1,367	27.04%	1,600	31.65%	1,065	21.07%	394	7.79%	141	2.79%	85	1.68%	114	2.26%	44	0.87%	23	0.45%	222	4.39%	5,055
Worth	115	30.67%	113	30.13%	55	14.67%	25	6.67%	14	3.73%	9	2.40%	11	2.93%	5	1.33%	18	4.80%	10	2.67%	375
Wright	190	33.81%	129	22.95%	124	22.06%	58	10.32%	7	1.25%	16	2.85%	4	0.71%	6	1.07%	15	2.67%	13	2.31%	562
Totals	51,666	27.64%	45,429	24.30%	43,228	23.13%	17,394	9.31%	8,481	4.54%	5,238	2.80%	3,485	1.86%	3,474	1.86%	3,345	1.79%	5,192	2.78%	186,932

Results of the Iowa Republican caucus, 2016 Cruz—40-50% Cruz—30-40% Cruz—20-30% Tied between Cruz and Trump Trump—20-30% Trump—30-40% Trump—40-50% Rubio—20-30% Rubio—30-40%

== Aftermath and controversy ==
The caucus results led to immediate controversy when Ben Carson accused Cruz's campaign of employing dishonest tactics, specifically claiming that Cruz supporters falsely told caucus-goers that Carson had dropped out to convince them to switch their votes.

Trump subsequently accused Cruz of "stealing" the Iowa caucuses through fraud, taking to social media to demand that Cruz be disqualified and the election results invalidated. These accusations foreshadowed continued tensions between Cruz and Trump as the primary campaign progressed. According to an interview of Trump with Greta Van Susteren of On the Record, he said, “Everything about it was disgraceful. It was a fraud as far as I was concerned.”

The results also had an immediate impact on the Republican field, as Rand Paul, Mike Huckabee, and Rick Santorum suspended their campaigns in the days following the caucuses.

== Geographic and demographic analysis ==
Exit polling revealed Cruz's victory was built on strong support from evangelical voters, who comprised 62% of caucus participants. He won 33% of evangelical voters, while also performing strongly in rural counties and areas with high evangelical populations.

Trump's support was notably stronger in eastern Iowa and working-class areas, particularly along the Mississippi River. He performed best among first-time caucus participants and voters without college degrees. Rubio showed particular strength in suburban areas around Des Moines, Cedar Rapids, and other population centers, winning 28% of college graduates and performing well among late-deciding voters.

2016 Iowa Republican Caucuses by demographic subgroup (Edison entrance polling)
Demographic subgroup	Cruz	Trump	Rubio	Carson	% of total vote
Total vote	27.6	24.3	23.1	9.3	90%
Gender
Men	29	25	25	8	52%
Women	27	24	21	11	48%
Race/ethnicity
White	28	24	23	9	97%
Age
17–29 years old	27	19	24	10	12%
30–44 years old	31	22	22	6	16%
45–64 years old	28	25	24	10	46%
65+ years old	27	26	22	10	27%
Ideology
Very Conservative	44	21	15	9	40%
Somewhat Conservative	19	24	29	11	45%
Moderate	9	34	28	6	14%
Party ID
Republican	30	25	23	9	79%
Independent	19	22	22	11	20%
Education
College Graduate	25	21	28	9	51%
Non-college	31	28	17	9	49%
Issue regarded as most important
Immigration	34	44	10	7	13%
Economy	18	24	30	9	27%
Terrorism	33	21	26	8	25%
Government spending	27	19	21	11	32%
Area type
Urban	24	23	28	7	20%
Suburban	28	22	25	7	36%
Rural	29	27	18	12	44%
Religion
Evangelical	33	21	21	12	62%
Non-Evangelical	19	29	26	5	38%

== See also ==
- 2016 Iowa Democratic presidential caucuses
