= Iowa's 37th House of Representatives district =

American legislative district

House District 37
- Type: District of the Lower house
- Location: Iowa
- Representative: Barb Kniff McCulla
- Parent organization: Iowa General Assembly

The 37th District of the Iowa House of Representatives in the state of Iowa is composed of parts of Marion, Jasper, and Mahaska counties.

== Representatives ==
The district has been represented by:

- Don Alt, 1969–1971
- Bill Hansen, 1971–1973
- Chuck Grassley, 1973–1975
- Raymond Lageschulte, 1975–1983
- Victor Stueland, 1983–1991
- Robert Johnson, 1991–1993
- Mark A. Henderson, 1993–1995
- Clyde Bradley, 1995–2003
- Jeff Elgin, 2003–2007
- Art Staed, 2007–2009
- Renee Schulte, 2009–2013
- John Landon, 2013–2021
- Mike Bousselot, 2021–2023
- Barb Kniff McCulla, 2023–2027
