= Mike Bousselot =

American politician

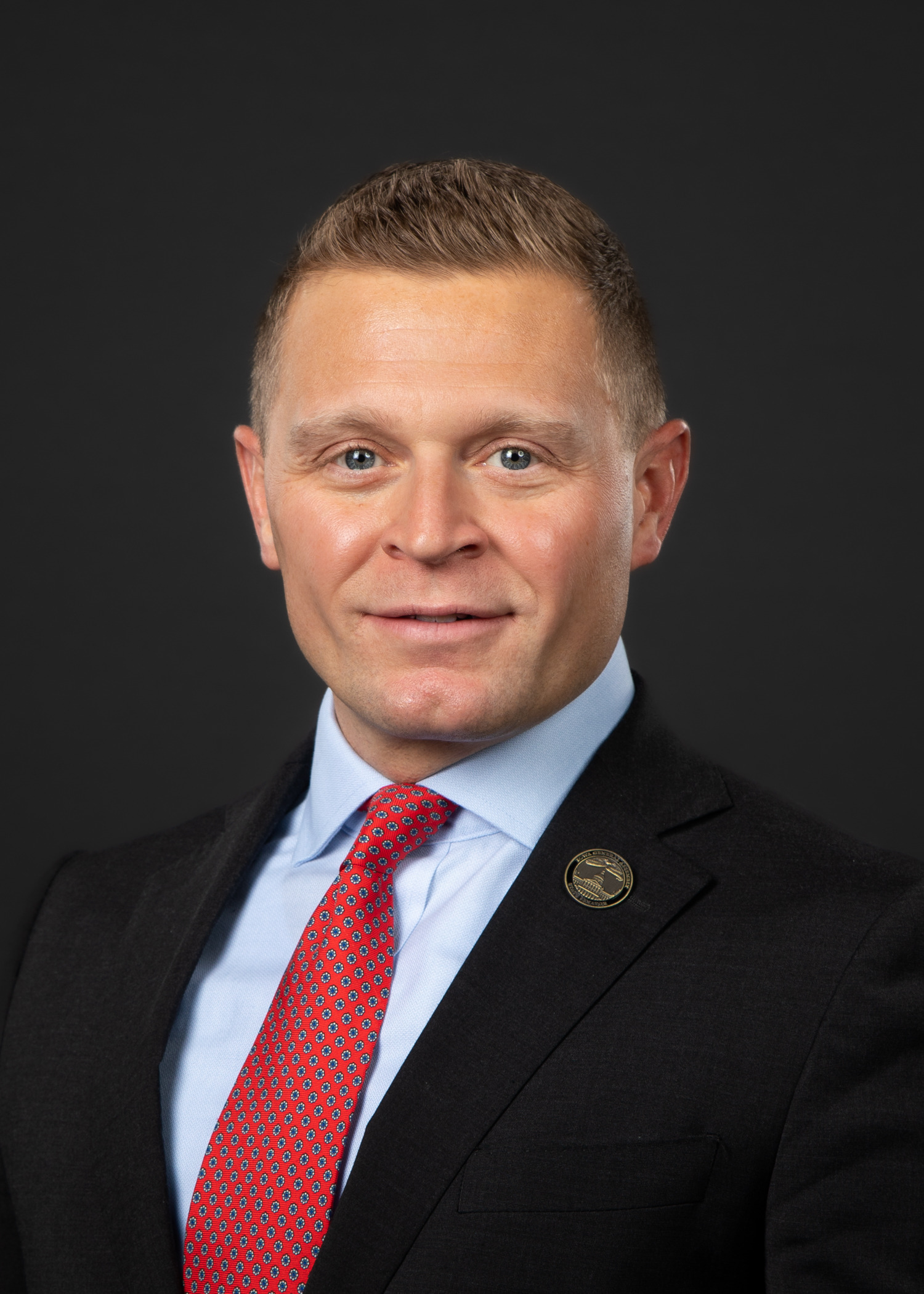
- Official portrait, c. 2023

Member of the Iowa Senate from the 21st district
- Incumbent
- Assumed office January 9, 2023
- Preceded by: Claire Celsi

Member of the Iowa House of Representatives from the 37th district
- In office September 15, 2021 – January 8, 2023
- Preceded by: John Landon
- Succeeded by: Barb McCulla

Personal details
- Born: Michael Robert Bousselot; November 2, 1982 (age 44) Rock Island, Illinois, U.S.
- Party: Republican
- Education: University of Iowa (BBA, MAcc); Drake University (JD)

Michael Robert Bousselot (born November 2, 1982) is an American attorney, political advisor, and politician serving as a member of the Iowa Senate from the 21st District. From 2021–2023, he was a member of the Iowa House of Representatives, representing the 37th district. He is a Republican. Bousselot has been described as having "deep personal, professional and economic ties" to Summit Agricultural Group.

== Early life and education ==
Bousselot earned a Bachelor of Business Administration in accounting and a Master of Accountancy from the University of Iowa while playing rugby, followed by a Juris Doctor from the Drake University Law School.

== Career ==
Bousselot began his career as a consultant at Deloitte. From 2015 to 2017, he served as chief of staff for Iowa Governor Terry Branstad and Lieutenant Governor Kim Reynolds. During his tenure in the administration, Bousselot specialized in pension, tax, health care, and local government policy. From 2015 to 2017, he served as chief of staff for Governor Brandstad. In 2017 and 2018, he was managing director of the Summit Agricultural Group. He was also the assistant vice president of Innovative Captive Strategies. In February 2021, Bousellot was appointed to serve as director of the Iowa Department of Management. He was elected to the Iowa House of Representatives assumed office on September 15, 2021 after a special election.

In 2023, Bousselot did not schedule a hearing on a House bill to limit or to restrict or ban the use of eminent domain even though more than three-fourths of Iowans opposed eminent domain for carbon capture and storage pipelines. He has been described as having "deep personal, professional and economic ties" to Summit Agricultural Group.

Bousselot announced in November 2025 that he would be running for re-election to the Iowa Senate, this time running in Iowa's 23rd Senate district to replace incumbent Jack Whitver, who is retiring. On August 14, 2026, Bousselot ended his campaign. On August 19, Wes Eros, Bousselot's primary opponent, was chosen as the replacement candidate.
