= Paul Craig (politician) =

American politician (1920–2005)

Member of the Iowa House of Representatives from the 51st district
- In office January 11, 1965 – January 8, 1967

Personal details
- Born: Paul Edward Craig; December 29, 1920 near Hudson, Iowa, U.S.
- Died: August 26, 2005 (aged 84) Mesa, Arizona, U.S.
- Party: Democratic
- Spouse: Betty Louise Krivohlavy
- Children: 2
- Education: University of Iowa
- Occupation: Politician

Military service
- Allegiance: United States
- Branch/service: United States Navy
- Years of service: 1941–1945

Paul Edward Craig (December 29, 1920 – August 26, 2005) was an American politician.

Paul Craig was born near Hudson and Reinbeck, Iowa, on December 29, 1920, to parents William Craig and Golda Walker. He had four siblings. Paul Craig graduated from Reinbeck High School in May 1940, and enlisted in the United States Navy in December 1941. Following the end of World War II and his discharge in December 1945, Craig attended the University of Iowa for the 1946-47 academic year before starting work for Northwestern Bell.

At the time of his election to the Iowa House of Representatives in 1964, Craig had worked for Northwestern Bell for fifteen years. He held the multi-member District 51 seat as a Democrat from January 11, 1965 to January 8, 1967.

Upon leaving the state house, Craig returned to Northwestern Bell. He retired to Tempe, Arizona, where his son lived, after three decades with the company. Craig died in Mesa on August 26, 2005.
