= Clyde Bradley =

American politician from Iowa (1934–2025)

Clyde E. Bradley
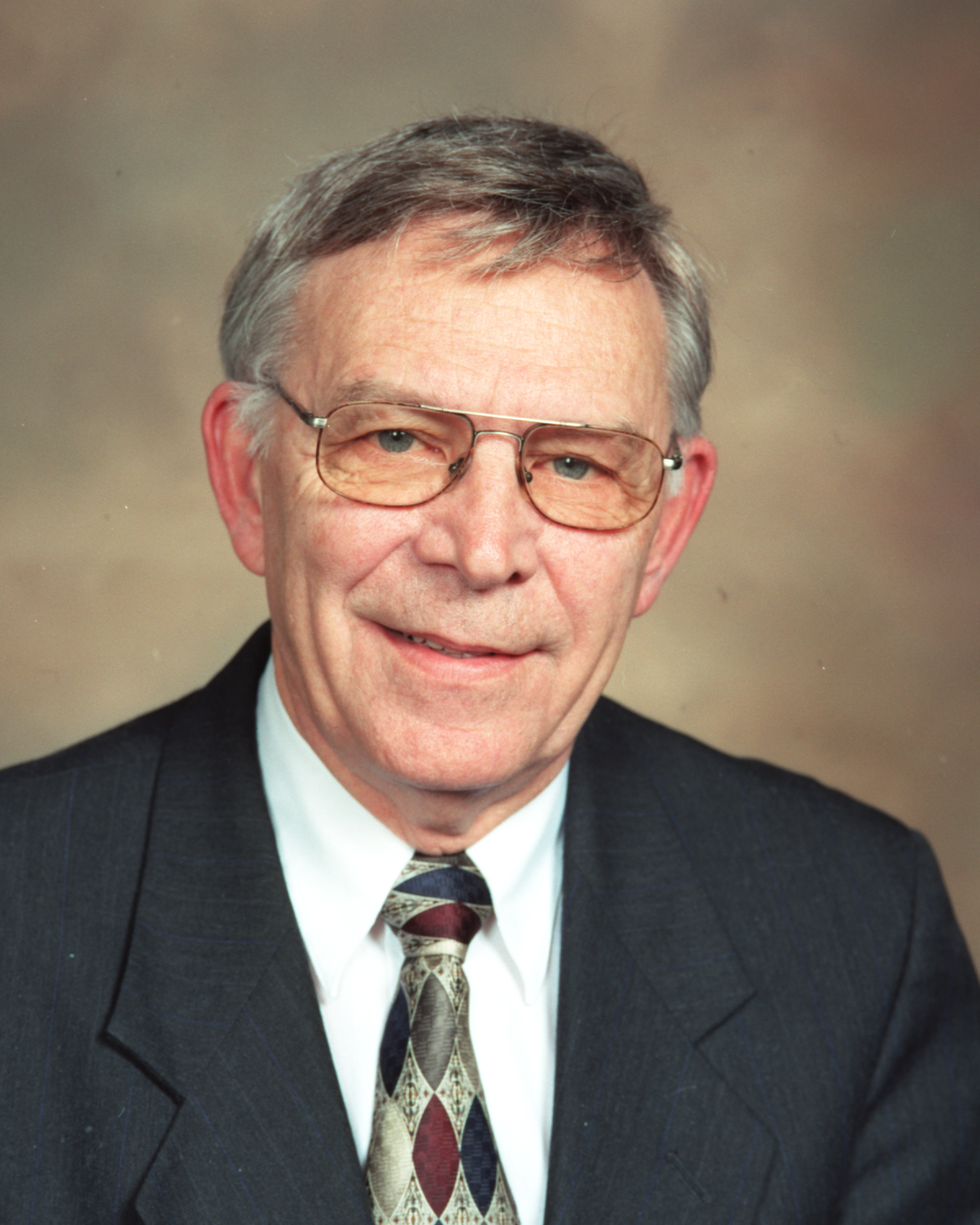

Member of the Iowa House of Representatives
- In office January 9, 1995 – January 12, 2003

Personal details
- Born: January 30, 1934 Luke, Maryland, U.S.
- Died: October 28, 2025 (aged 91)
- Party: Republican
- Spouse: Patty
- Children: 4
- Occupation: Engineer

Clyde Edward Bradley (January 30, 1934 – October 28, 2025) was an American politician in the state of Iowa.

A Republican, he served in the Iowa House of Representatives from 1995 to 2003 (37th district), from Clinton County, Iowa.

== Life and career ==
Bradley was born in Luke, Maryland, on January 30, 1934, and attended the University of Iowa.

After graduation from Lyons High School, Clinton, Iowa, Clyde attended Clinton Community College until called to active duty in the Army 82nd ABN and was a combat Veteran of the Korean War. After completion of active duty, Clyde attended the University of Iowa and received his first degree in Civil Engineering in 1959. He later completed his second degree in Mechanical Engineering from Massachusetts Institute of Technology (MIT).

Clyde enlisted in the Navy Civil Engineering Corps (Seabees) immediately after graduation from the University of Iowa in August 1958. Prior to leaving for Officer Candidate School Newport, Rhode Island in January 1959, Clyde met and was engaged to Patricia McDonnell of Clinton, Iowa. They were married May 16, 1959 on his way to his first duty station at Oxnard, CA. They were married for 65 years.

Clyde served over 30 years Active Duty and Reserves. His last duty station was Commander of the 30th Naval Regiment headquartered on the Island of Guam. He retired from the Navy Civil Corps (Seabees) with the rank of Captain.

After serving on Active Duty, Clyde was employed as a civilian working for the US Army Weapons Command of Rock Island Arsenal. His first assignment was to correct the manufacturing and design problems with the M16 rifle which troops were experiencing in combat in Vietnam. Today, the M16A2 and its successor versions are the most reliable and effective small arms in the US Military. Upon retirement, Clyde was a senior executive at the US Army Weapons Command at Rock Island Arsenal.

Bradley died on October 28, 2025, at the age of 91.
