= Jeff Elgin =

American politician (born 1951)

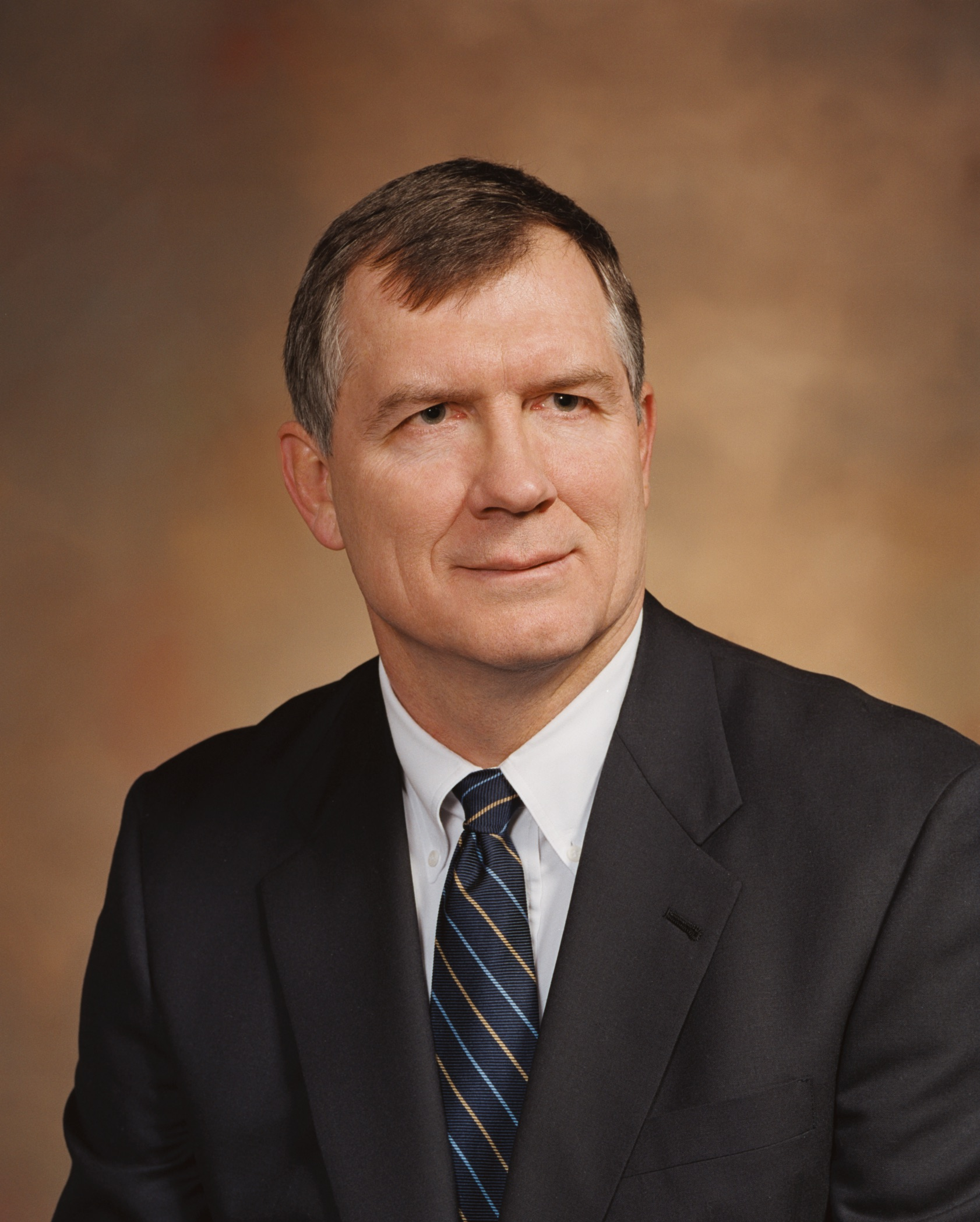
- Elgin in 2003

Member of the Iowa House of Representatives
- In office January 8, 2001 – January 7, 2007
- Preceded by: Rosemary Thomson
- Succeeded by: Art Staed
- Constituency: District 51 (2001-2003); District 37 (2003-2007)

Personal details
- Born: February 22, 1951 (age 75) Cedar Rapids, Iowa, United States
- Party: Republican
- Spouse: Terri
- Children: three
- Education: University of Iowa
- Occupation: businessman/investor

Jeffrey C. Elgin (born February 22, 1951) is an American politician in the state of Iowa.

Elgin was born in Cedar Rapids, Iowa. He attended West Des Moines Valley High School, where he earned letters in football, track, wrestling and baseball. He attended the University of Iowa on a football scholarship and earned a varsity letter in 1970.

He is a businessman/investor. A Republican, he served in the Iowa House of Representatives from 2001 to 2007 (51st district from 2001 to 2003 and 37th district from 2003 to 2007).
