= Brett Barker =

American politician

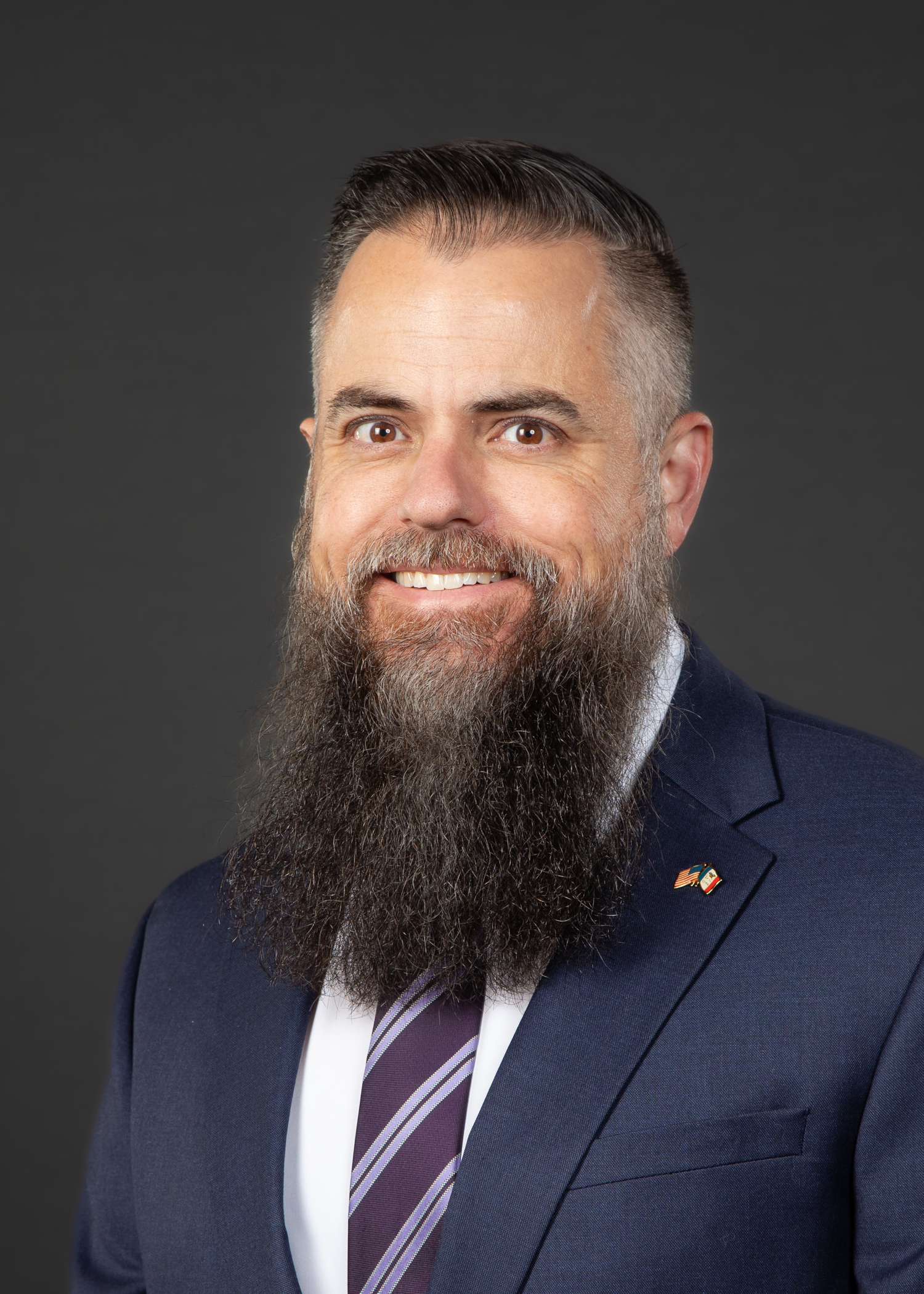

Member of the Iowa House of Representatives from the 51st district
- Incumbent
- Assumed office January 13, 2025
- Preceded by: Dave Deyoe

Personal details
- Party: Republican
- Website: www.barkerforiowa.com

Brett Barker is an American politician. He serves as a Republican member for the 51st district in the Iowa House of Representatives since 2025.

Born in Niskayuna, New York, Barker graduated from J. D. Darnall High School in Geneseo, Illinois, and earned a Doctor of Pharmacy degree from the University of Iowa. Before entering the legislature, he worked as a pharmacist and vice president of operations at NuCara Pharmacy, and served as Mayor of Nevada, Iowa and Chair of Story County Republicans.

In 2024, he was elected to the Iowa House after defeating Marty Chitty in the Republican primary and Ryan Condon in the general election. He is vice chair of the Health and Human Services Committee, and also sits on the Commerce, Economic Growth & Technology, and Natural Resources Committees.
