= Iowa's 51st House of Representatives district =

American legislative district

House District 51
- Type: District of the Lower house
- Location: Iowa
- Representative: Brett Barker
- Parent organization: Iowa General Assembly

The 51st District of the Iowa House of Representatives in the state of Iowa is composed of parts of Story and Marshall Counties.

== Representatives ==
The district has previously been represented by:

- Paul Craig, 1965–1967
- Raymond J. Taylor, 1971–1973
- Donald V. Doyle, 1973–1981
- Al Sturgeon, 1981–1983
- Richard Running, 1983–1989
- Philip Brammer, 1989–1993
- Mary Lundby, 1993–1995
- Rosemary Thomson, 1995–2001
- Jeff Elgin, 2001–2003
- Rod Roberts, 2003–2011
- Dan Muhlbauer, 2011–2013
- Josh Byrnes, 2013–2017
- Jane Bloomingdale, 2017–2023
- Dave Deyoe, 2023–2025
- Brett Barker, 2025–Present
