= Art Staed =

American politician

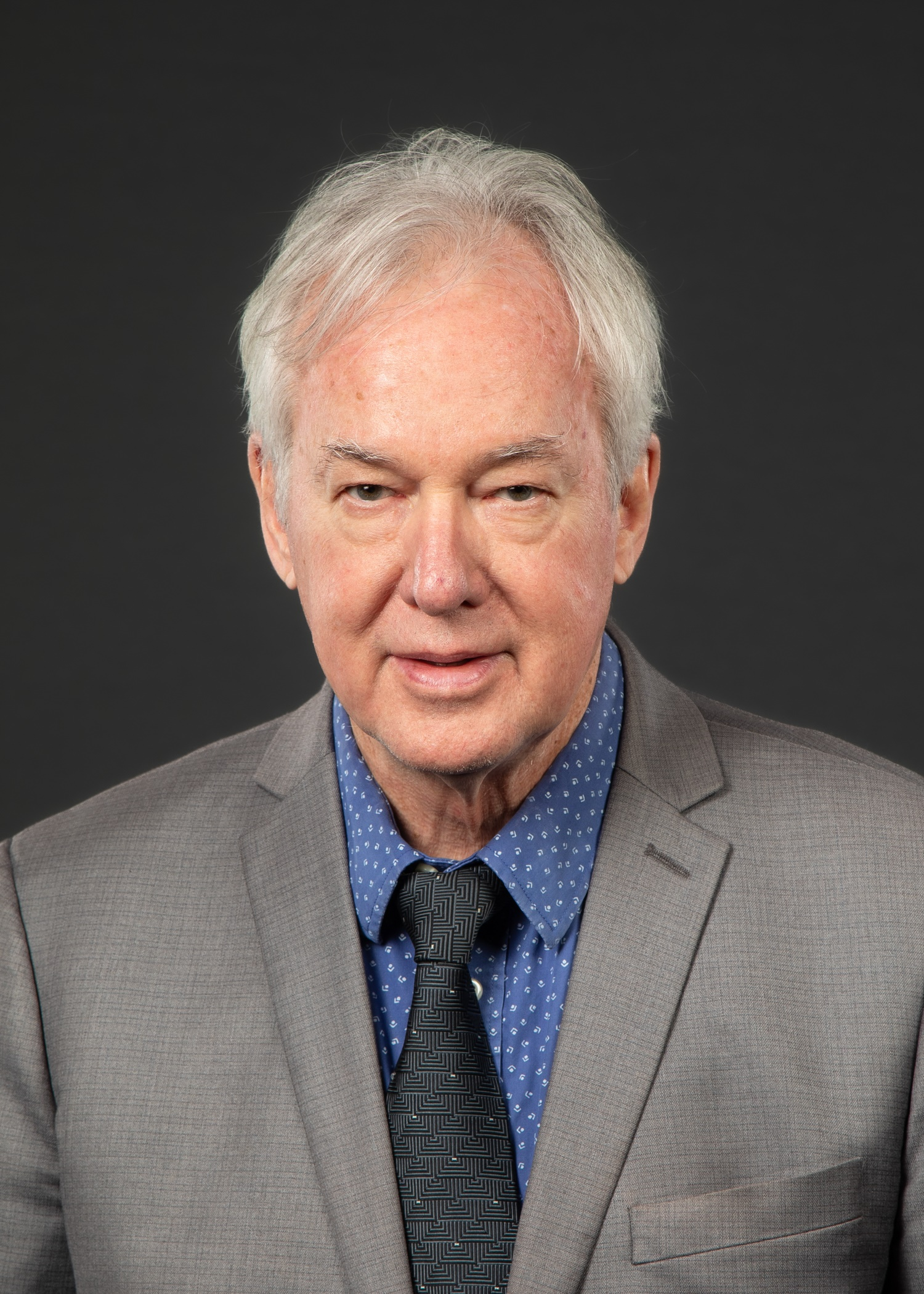
- Staed in 2025

Member of the Iowa Senate from the 40th district
- Incumbent
- Assumed office January 13, 2025
- Preceded by: Todd Taylor

Member of the Iowa House of Representatives from the 66th district
- In office January 14, 2013 – January 13, 2025
- Preceded by: Ako Abdul-Samad
- Succeeded by: Aime Wichtendahl

Member of the Iowa House of Representatives from the 37th district
- In office 2006–2009
- Preceded by: Jeff Elgin
- Succeeded by: Renee Schulte

Personal details
- Born: April 21, 1949 (age 77) Joplin, Missouri, U.S.
- Party: Democratic
- Spouse: Susan
- Children: 4
- Education: Rockhurst University (BA); University of Missouri at Kansas City (M.Ed); East Central University (M.Ed)
- Occupation: Educator
- Website: Staed's legislative website

Art Staed (born 1949) is a current Iowa State Senator from the 40th District. A Democrat, he was in the Iowa House of Representatives for one term, from 2007 to 2009 and again from 2013 to 2025. Staed holds a B.A. in Philosophy from Rockhurst University in Kansas City, a Master's degree in Secondary Education from the University of Missouri at Kansas City and another master's degree in Secondary Administration from East Central University in Ada, Oklahoma.

Staed served on several committees in the Iowa House – Education, Labor, and Veterans Affairs. He also served as vice chair of the Economic Growth Committee and of the Economic Development Appropriations Subcommittee.

As of the 2013 legislative session, Staed served on the Education, Local Government and Veterans Affairs committees and the Administration and Regulation Appropriations Subcommittee.

== Electoral history ==
Staed ran for the Iowa House in 2004, losing to the incumbent, Republican Jeff Elgin. He was elected in 2006, defeating Republican opponent Andy Anderson. Republican Renee Schulte narrowly defeated him in 2008, 8628 (49.95%) to 8615 (49.88%). A recount resulted in a net gain of one vote for Staed, leaving the election with a 13-vote margin of victory.

Election	Political result	Candidate	Party	Votes	%
Iowa House of Representatives elections, 2004; District 37; Turnout: 17,085	Republican hold	Jeff Elgin*	Republican	9,579	56.1
Iowa House of Representatives elections, 2004; District 37; Turnout: 17,085	Republican hold	Art Staed	Democratic	7,493	43.9
Iowa House of Representatives elections, 2006; District 37; Turnout: 12,569	Democratic gain from Republican	Art Staed	Democratic	6,462	51.4
Iowa House of Representatives elections, 2006; District 37; Turnout: 12,569	Democratic gain from Republican	Andy Anderson	Republican	6,097	48.5
Iowa House of Representatives elections, 2008; District 37; Turnout: 17,272	Republican gain from Democratic	Renee Schulte	Republican	8,628	50.0
Iowa House of Representatives elections, 2008; District 37; Turnout: 17,272	Republican gain from Democratic	Art Staed*	Democratic	8,615	49.9

Iowa Senate
Preceded by Todd Taylor	80th District; 2025 – present	Succeeded by Incumbent
Iowa House of Representatives
Preceded by Holly Brink	80th District; 2023 – 2025	Succeeded by Aime Wichtendahl
Preceded by Ako Abdul-Samad	66th District; 2013 – 2023	Succeeded by Steve Bradley
Preceded by Jeff Elgin	37th District; 2007–2009	Succeeded by Renee Schulte
