= Renee Schulte =

Former American politician

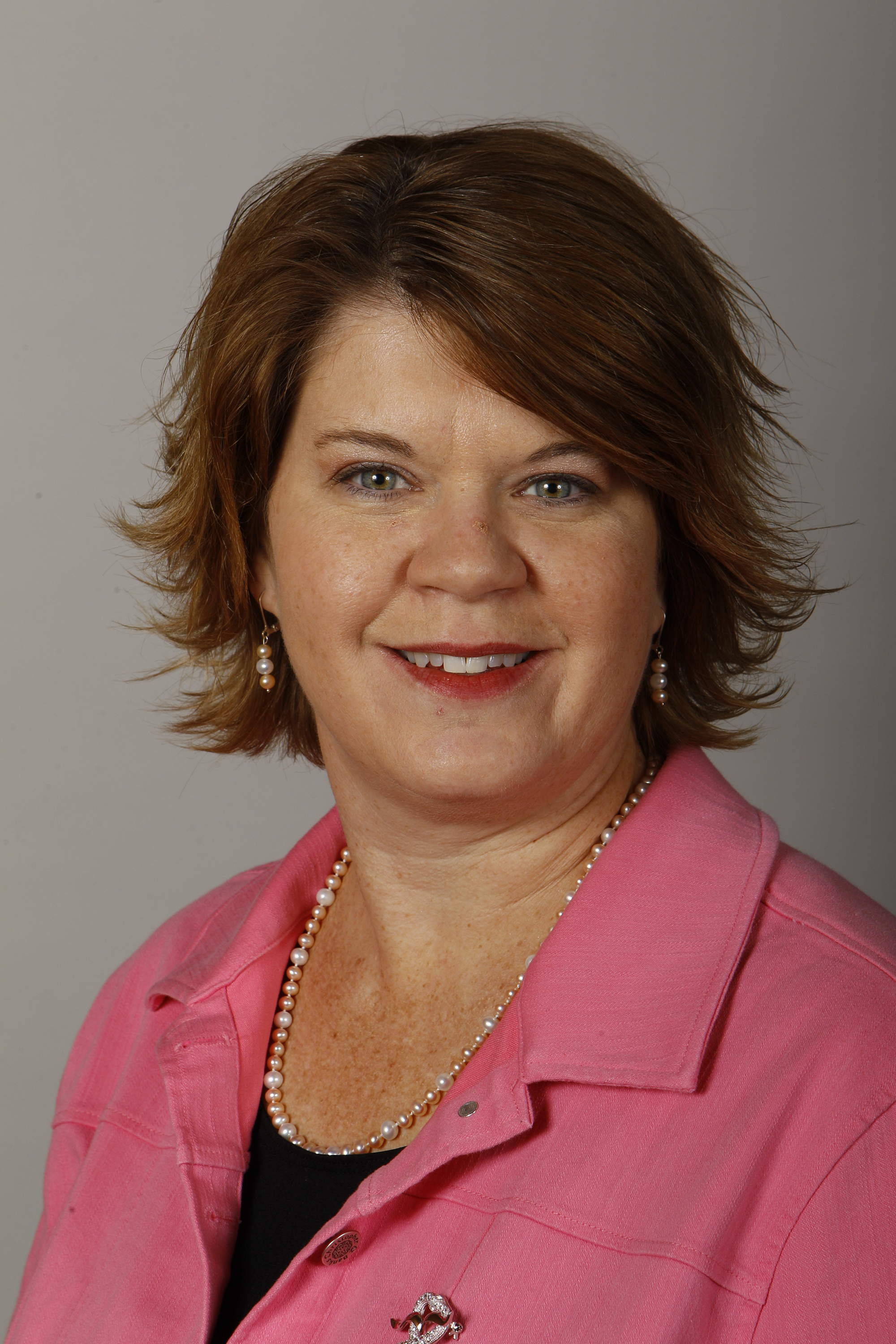

Member of the Iowa House of Representatives from the 37th district
- In office January 14, 2008 – January 14, 2013
- Preceded by: Art Staed
- Succeeded by: John Landon

Personal details
- Born: December 9, 1970 (age 55) Centralia, Illinois
- Party: Republican
- Spouse: Brent
- Education: New Mexico State University
- Occupation: Strategic Planning Consultant
- Profession: Licensed Mental Health Therapist; Adjunct Professor – Mt. Mercy University
- Website: Schlute's website

Renee Schulte (born December 9, 1970) is a former American politician who was the Iowa State Representative for the 37th District.

== Early life ==
Schulte graduated from Danville High School in Danville, Illinois. She attended New Mexico State University in Las Cruces, New Mexico, where she earned her bachelor's degree in psychology and a master's degree in counseling and educational psychology. Renee and her husband Brent, disciple minister at Antioch Christian Church in Cedar Rapids, previously lived in New Mexico and Texas before moving to Iowa in 2001 to be closer to family.

== Electoral history ==
Schulte narrowly won election to the Iowa House in 2008 defeating Democrat Art Staed, 8628 (49.95%) to 8615 (49.88%). A recount resulted in a net gain of one vote for Staed, leaving the election with a 13-vote margin of victory. Schulte won re-election in 2010, defeating Democratic opponent Mark Seidl. *incumbent

Election	Political result	Candidate	Party	Votes	%
Iowa House of Representatives elections, 2008; District 37; Turnout: 17,272	Republican gain from Democratic	Renee Schulte	Republican	8,628	50.0
Iowa House of Representatives elections, 2008; District 37; Turnout: 17,272	Republican gain from Democratic	Art Staed*	Democratic	8,615	49.9
Iowa House of Representatives elections, 2010; District 37; Turnout: 13,021	Republican hold	Renee Schulte*	Republican	6,836	52.5
Iowa House of Representatives elections, 2010; District 37; Turnout: 13,021	Republican hold	Mark J. Seidl	Democratic	5,762	44.3

== Awards ==
Schulte has received the following honors and awards:

- 2011 Emerging Leader - State Legislative Leaders Foundation
- 2011 Toll Fellowship
- Voice of Children Award - Orchard Place Board of Directors
- Iowa Farm Bureau "Friend of Agriculture"
- Iowa Physician Assistant Society "Legislator of the Year"

Iowa House of Representatives
Preceded by Art Staed	37th District; 2008 – 2013	Succeeded by John Landon
