= John Landon (Iowa politician) =

American politician (1950–2021)

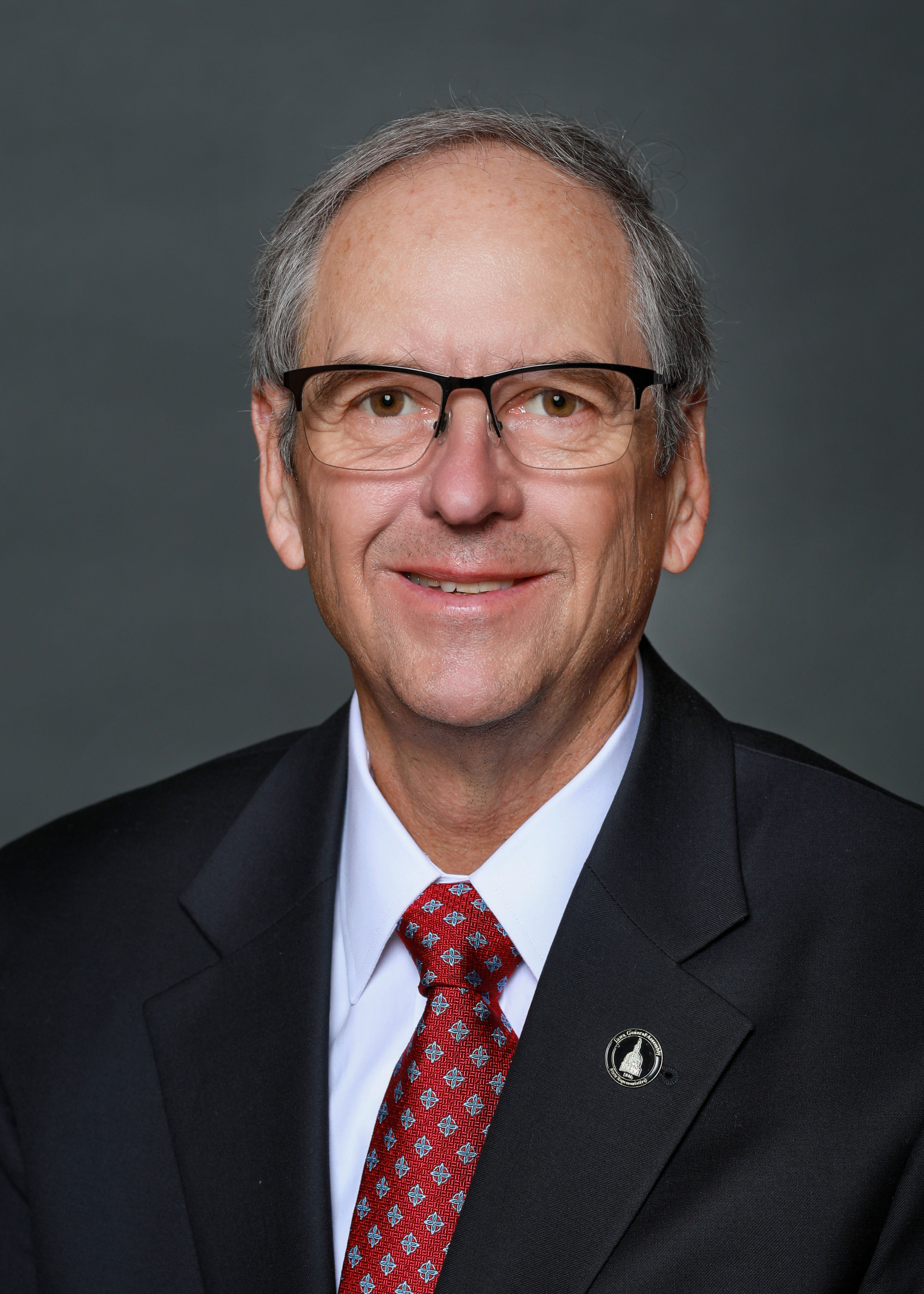

Member of the Iowa House of Representatives from the 37th district
- In office January 14, 2013 – July 29, 2021
- Preceded by: Renee Schulte
- Succeeded by: Mike Bousselot

Personal details
- Born: March 7, 1950 State Center, Iowa, U.S.
- Died: July 29, 2021 (aged 71) Ankeny, Iowa, U.S.
- Party: Republican
- Education: Iowa State University
- Website: legis.iowa.gov/...

John Robert Landon (March 7, 1950 – July 29, 2021) was an American politician who served in the Iowa House of Representatives from the 37th district from 2013 to 2021. A Republican, Landon was born in State Center, Iowa and resided in Ankeny, Iowa. He had a B.S. in agriculture from Iowa State University.

As of May 2013, Landon served on several committees in the Iowa House – the Commerce, Human Resources, and Transportation committees. He also served as the vice chair of the Ways and Means committee and as a member of the Capitals Appropriations Subcommittee.

He died from cancer while still in office on July 29, 2021, at the age of 71.

== Electoral history ==
*incumbent

Election	Political result	Candidate	Party	Votes	%
Iowa House of Representatives primary elections, 2012; District 37; Turnout: 2,094	Republican 35% plurality not reached. (Note: To win a partisan primary election in Iowa, a candidate must reach a minimum of 35% of the votes cast. When, as here, that threshold is not reached, the nominee is chosen at a party nominating convention.)	Jim Robidoux	Republican	714	34.10%
Iowa House of Representatives primary elections, 2012; District 37; Turnout: 2,094	Republican 35% plurality not reached.	Matt DeVries	Republican	623	29.75%
Iowa House of Representatives primary elections, 2012; District 37; Turnout: 2,094	Republican 35% plurality not reached.	John Landon	Republican	366	17.48%
Iowa House of Representatives primary elections, 2012; District 37; Turnout: 2,094	Republican 35% plurality not reached.	Jeffrey A. Wright	Republican	321	15.33%
Iowa House of Representatives primary elections, 2012; District 37; Turnout: 2,094	Republican 35% plurality not reached.	Jacob Mason	Republican	35	1.67%
Iowa House of Representatives primary elections, 2012; District 37; Turnout: 2,094	Republican 35% plurality not reached.	Stacey C. Rogers	Republican	30	1.43%
Iowa House of Representatives nominating convention, 2012; District 37, First Ballot; Turnout: 21	Republican Majority not reached.	Matt DeVries	Republican	10	47.62%
Iowa House of Representatives nominating convention, 2012; District 37, First Ballot; Turnout: 21	Republican Majority not reached.	John Landon	Republican	10	47.62%
Iowa House of Representatives nominating convention, 2012; District 37, First Ballot; Turnout: 21	Republican Majority not reached.	Jim Robidoux	Republican	1	4.76%
Iowa House of Representatives nominating convention, 2012; District 37, First Ballot; Turnout: 21	Republican Majority not reached.	Jeff Wright	Republican	0	0.00%
Iowa House of Representatives nominating convention, 2012; District 37, Second Ballot; Turnout: 21	Republican	John Landon	Republican	12	57.14%
Iowa House of Representatives nominating convention, 2012; District 37, Second Ballot; Turnout: 21	Republican	Matt DeVries	Republican	9	42.86%
Iowa House of Representatives general elections, 2012; District 37; Turnout: 19,036	Republican (newly redistricted)	John Landon	Republican	11,042	58.01%
Iowa House of Representatives general elections, 2012; District 37; Turnout: 19,036	Republican (newly redistricted)	N. John Boehm	Independent	3,598	18.90%

== Notes ==
Iowa House of Representatives
Preceded by Renee Schulte	37th District; 2013–2021	Succeeded by
