= 2008 Iowa House of Representatives election =

- November 4, 2008

All 100 seats in the Iowa House of Representatives 51 seats needed for a majority
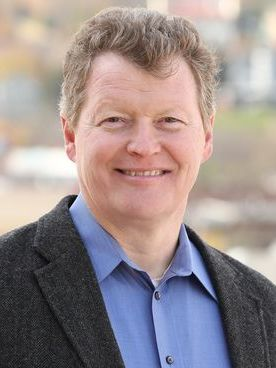

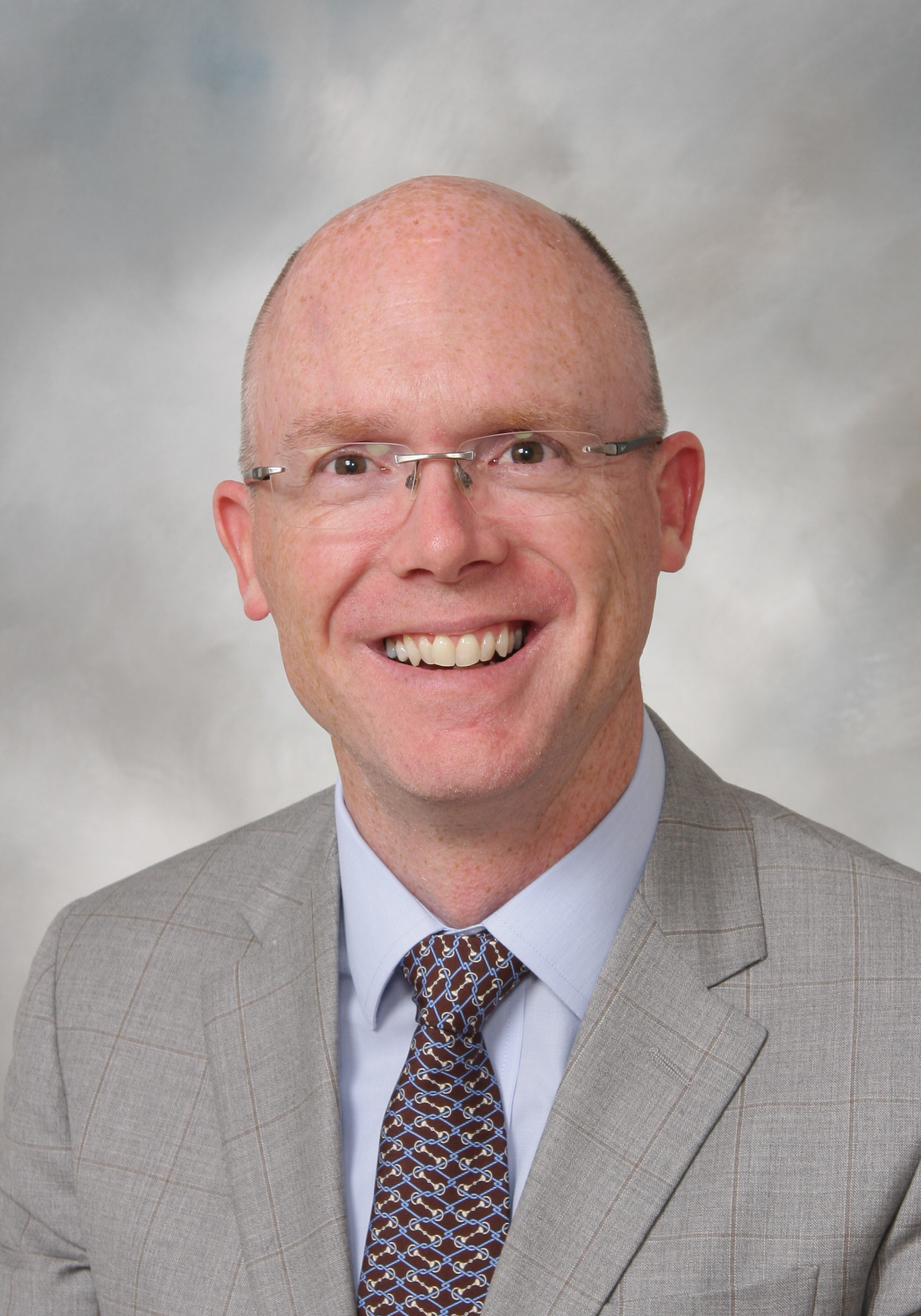
	Majority party	Minority party
Leader	Pat Murphy	Christopher Rants (stepped down)
Party	Democratic	Republican
Leader since	January 4, 2003	January 4, 2003
Leader's seat	28th district	54th district
Last election	54	46
Seats after	57	43
Seat change	▲3	▼3
- Republican gain Democratic gain Republican hold Democratic hold
Speaker of the House before election
Pat Murphy
Democratic
Elected Speaker of the House
Pat Murphy
Democratic

The 2008 Iowa House of Representatives election were held on November 4, 2008. The Iowa House, like the United States House of Representatives, is up for re-election in its entirety every two years. Prior to the election, the Democrats were in the majority - this marked the first time in 42 years that the Democrats had controlled both branches of the Iowa General Assembly and the Governor's Office. Democrats retained this majority following the 2008 elections.

== Predictions ==
Source	Ranking	As of
Stateline	Likely D	October 15, 2008

== Overview ==
Iowa House: pre-election	Seats
Democratic-held	54
Republican-held	46
Total	100

2006 Elections
Democratic held and uncontested	10
Contested	84
Republican held and uncontested	6
Total	100

Iowa House: post-election	Seats
Democratic-held	56
Republican-held	44
Total	100

== General election ==
District	Party	Incumbent	Status	Party	Candidate	Votes	%
1	Democratic	Wes Whitead	Won re-election.	Democratic	Wes Whitead	6,148	
1	Democratic	Wes Whitead	Won re-election.	Republican	Jeremy Taylor	6,093	
2	Democratic	Roger Wendt	Won re-election..	Democratic	Roger Wendt	4,709	
2	Democratic	Roger Wendt	Won re-election..	Republican	Rick Bertrand	4,429	
3	Republican	Chuck Soderberg	Won re-election.	Republican	Chuck Soderberg	10,456	
3	Republican	Chuck Soderberg	Won re-election.	Democratic	T.J. Templeton	3,283	
4	Republican	Dwayne Alons	Won re-election.	Republican	Dwayne Alons	12,345	
4	Republican	Dwayne Alons	Won re-election.	Democratic	James van Bruggen	2,693	
5	Republican	Royd Chambers	Won re-election.	Republican	Royd Chambers	10,890	
6	Republican	Mike May	Won re-election.	Republican	Mike May	12,405	
7	Democratic	Marcella Frevert	Won re-election.	Democratic	Marcella Frevert	7,837	
7	Democratic	Marcella Frevert	Won re-election.	Republican	Debra Satern	5,535	
8	Democratic	Dolores Mertz	Won re-election.	Democratic	Dolores Mertz	7,245	
8	Democratic	Dolores Mertz	Won re-election.	Republican	Stephen Richards	7,202	
9	Democratic	McKinley Bailey	Won re-election.	Democratic	McKinley Bailey	7,376	
9	Democratic	McKinley Bailey	Won re-election.	Republican	Jamie Johnson	5,965	
10	Republican	Dave Deyoe	Won re-election.	Republican	Dave Deyoe	9.240	
10	Republican	Dave Deyoe	Won re-election.	Democratic	Susan Radke	6,310	
11	Republican	Henry Rayhons	Won re-election.	Republican	Henry Rayhons	8,379	
11	Republican	Henry Rayhons	Won re-election.	Democratic	Ann Marie Fairchild	6,246	
12	Republican	Linda Upmeyer	Won re-election.	Republican	Linda Upmeyer	10,086	
12	Republican	Linda Upmeyer	Won re-election.	Democratic	Randall Rainer	4,380	
13	Republican	Bill Schickel		Democratic	Sharon Steckman	8,366	
13	Republican	Bill Schickel		Republican	Scott Tornquist	6,267	
14	Democratic	Mark Kuhn	Won re-election.	Democratic	Mark Kuhn	10,131	
14	Democratic	Mark Kuhn	Won re-election.	Republican	Jeff Mosiman	4,150	
15	Democratic	Brian Quirk	Won re-election.	Democratic	Brian Quirk	9,679	
15	Democratic	Brian Quirk	Won re-election.	Independent	Dan Lensing	3,336	
16	Republican	Chuck Gipp		Democratic	John W. Beard	8,172	
16	Republican	Chuck Gipp		Republican	Randy Schissel	6,348	
17	Republican	Pat Grassley	Won re-election.	Republican	Pat Grassley	9,836	
17	Republican	Pat Grassley	Won re-election.	Democratic	Cayla Baresel	5,102	
18	Democratic	Andrew Wenthe	Won re-election.	Democratic	Andrew Wenthe	7,861	
18	Democratic	Andrew Wenthe	Won re-election.	Republican	Austin Lorenzen	6,170	
19	Democratic	Bob Kressig	Won re-election.	Democratic	Bob Kressig	8,468	
19	Democratic	Bob Kressig	Won re-election.	Republican	Carlin Hageman	6,234	
20	Democratic	Doris Kelley	Won re-election.	Democratic	Doris Kelley	9,840	
20	Democratic	Doris Kelley	Won re-election.	Republican	Vic Mokricky	7,116	
21	Republican	Tami Wiencek	Lost re-election.	Democratic	Kerry Burt	6,673	
21	Republican	Tami Wiencek	Lost re-election.	Republican	Tami Wiencek	6,454	
22	Democratic	Deborah Berry	Won re-election.	Democratic	Deborah Berry	10,081	
23	Republican	Dan Rasmussen	Lost re-election.	Democratic	Gene Ficken	7,520	
23	Republican	Dan Rasmussen	Lost re-election.	Republican	Dan Rasmussen	6,761	
24	Democratic	Roger Thomas	Won re-election.	Democratic	Roger Thomas	10,578	
25	Democratic	Tom Schueller	Won re-election.	Democratic	Tom Schueller	11,118	
26	Democratic	Polly Bukta	Won re-election.	Democratic	Polly Bukta	8,351	
26	Democratic	Polly Bukta	Won re-election.	Republican	Jonathan van Roekel	4,834	
27	Democratic	Pam Jochum	Won re-election.	Democratic	Charles Isenhart	8,903	
27	Democratic	Pam Jochum	Won re-election.	Republican	Lou Oswald	4,814	
28	Democratic	Pat Murphy	Won re-election.	Democratic	Pat Murphy	9,518	
28	Democratic	Pat Murphy	Won re-election.	Republican	Darren White	4,227	
29	Democratic	Ro Foege		Democratic	Nate Willems	10,524	
29	Democratic	Ro Foege		Republican	Emma Nemecek	7,469	
30	Democratic	David Jacoby	Won re-election.	Democratic	David Jacoby	15,851	
31	Democratic	Ray Zirkelbach	Won re-election.	Democratic	Ray Zirkelbach	9,818	
31	Democratic	Ray Zirkelbach	Won re-election.	Republican	Dena Himes	5,096	
32	Republican	Steven Lukan	Won re-election.	Republican	Steven Lukan	10,725	
32	Republican	Steven Lukan	Won re-election.	Democratic	Tom Avenarius	5,016	
33	Democratic	Dick Taylor	Won re-election.	Democratic	Dick Taylor	9,273	
33	Democratic	Dick Taylor	Won re-election.	Republican	Kathy Potts	3,996	
34	Democratic	Todd Taylor	Won re-election.	Democratic	Todd Taylor	11,625	
35	Republican	Kraig Paulsen	Won re-election.	Republican	Kraig Paulsen	10,623	
35	Republican	Kraig Paulsen	Won re-election.	Democratic	Mike Robinson	7,565	
36	Democratic	Swati Dandekar	Elected to Senate district 18.	Republican	Nick Wagner	10,737	
36	Democratic	Swati Dandekar	Elected to Senate district 18.	Democratic	Gretchen Lawyer	8,634	
37	Democratic	Art Staed	Lost re-election.	Republican	Renee Schulte	8,628	
37	Democratic	Art Staed	Lost re-election.	Democratic	Art Staed	8,615	
38	Democratic	Tyler Olson	Won re-election.	Democratic	Tyler Olson	11,571	
39	Republican	Dawn Pettengill	Won re-election.	Republican	Dawn Pettengill	8,291	
39	Republican	Dawn Pettengill	Won re-election.	Democratic	Terry Hertle	6,893	
40	Republican	Lance Horbach	Won re-election.	Republican	Lance Horbach	8,912	
40	Republican	Lance Horbach	Won re-election.	Democratic	Chris Bearden	5,787	
41	Democratic	Paul Bell	Won re-election.	Democratic	Paul Bell	8,885	
41	Democratic	Paul Bell	Won re-election.	Republican	Adam Vandall	5,833	
42	Democratic	Geri Huser	Won re-election.	Democratic	Geri Huser	12,201	
43	Democratic	Mark Smith	Won re-election.	Democratic	Mark Smith	7,325	
43	Democratic	Mark Smith	Won re-election.	Republican	Jane Jech	5,557	
44	Republican	Polly Granzow		Republican	Annette Sweeney	7,508	
44	Republican	Polly Granzow		Democratic	Tim Hoy	6,520	
45	Democratic	Beth Wessel-Kroeschell	Won re-election.	Democratic	Beth Wessel-Kroeschell	8,589	
45	Democratic	Beth Wessel-Kroeschell	Won re-election.	Republican	Ryan Rhodes	6,168	
46	Democratic	Lisa Heddens	Won re-election.	Democratic	Lisa Heddens	11,953	
46	Democratic	Lisa Heddens	Won re-election.	Libertarian	Eric Cooper	3,124	
47	Republican	Ralph Watts	Won re-election.	Republican	Ralph Watts	15,111	
47	Republican	Ralph Watts	Won re-election.	Democratic	Susan Temere	10,256	
48	Democratic	Donovan Olson	Won re-election.	Democratic	Donovan Olson	10,248	
49	Democratic	Helen Miller	Won re-election.	Democratic	Helen Miller	7,901	
49	Democratic	Helen Miller	Won re-election.	Republican	Michael J. Littzen	5,338	
50	Republican	David Tjepkes	Won re-election.	Republican	David Tjepkes	8,195	
50	Republican	David Tjepkes	Won re-election.	Democratic	Lynne Gentry	4,519	
51	Republican	Rod Roberts	Won re-election.	Republican	Rod Roberts	10,020	
52	Republican	Gary Worthan	Won re-election.	Republican	Gary Worthan	7,362	
52	Republican	Gary Worthan	Won re-election.	Democratic	Russell Camerer	3,843	
53	Republican	Dan Huseman	Won re-election.	Republican	Dan Huseman	8,532	
53	Republican	Dan Huseman	Won re-election.	Democratic	Lori Sokolowski	6,094	
54	Republican	Christopher Rants	Won re-election.	Republican	Christopher Rants	7,885	
54	Republican	Christopher Rants	Won re-election.	Democratic	Carlos Venable-Ridley	5,786	
55	Republican	Clarence Hoffman		Republican	Jason Schultz	9,002	
56	Republican	Matt Windschitl	Won re-election.	Republican	Matt Windschitl	8,166	
56	Republican	Matt Windschitl	Won re-election.	Democratic	Jan Creasman	5,726	
57	Republican	Jack Drake	Won re-election.	Republican	Jack Drake	8,317	
57	Republican	Jack Drake	Won re-election.	Democratic	Ron Rosmann	5,835	
58	Republican	Clel Baudler	Won re-election.	Republican	Clel Baudler	8,256	
58	Republican	Clel Baudler	Won re-election.	Democratic	Christopher Nelson	5,896	
59	Republican	Dan Clute		Republican	Chris Hagenow	8,240	
59	Republican	Dan Clute		Democratic	Jerry Sullivan	8,147	
60	Republican	Libby Jacobs		Republican	Peter Cownie	8,905	
60	Republican	Libby Jacobs		Democratic	Alan R. Koslow	6,874	
60	Republican	Libby Jacobs		Libertarian	Russ Gibson	499	
61	Democratic	Jo Oldson	Won re-election.	Democratic	Jo Oldson	10,519	
61	Democratic	Jo Oldson	Won re-election.	Republican	Eric Kohlsdorf	5,213	
62	Democratic	Bruce Hunter	Won re-election.	Democratic	Bruce Hunter	7,381	
62	Democratic	Bruce Hunter	Won re-election.	Republican	Chris Sanger	4,261	
63	Republican	Scott Raecker	Won re-election.	Republican	Scott Raecker	11,265	
63	Republican	Scott Raecker	Won re-election.	Democratic	Nita Garvin	7,251	
64	Democratic	Janet Petersen	Won re-election.	Democratic	Janet Petersen	10,259	
64	Democratic	Janet Petersen	Won re-election.	Republican	Steve Svedja	5,034	
65	Democratic	Wayne Ford	Won re-election.	Democratic	Wayne Ford	7,870	
65	Democratic	Wayne Ford	Won re-election.	Republican	David Barnett	3,422	
66	Democratic	Ako Abdul-Samad	Won re-election.	Democratic	Ako Abdul-Samad	6,734	
66	Democratic	Ako Abdul-Samad	Won re-election.	Green	Chris Moeller	1,889	
67	Democratic	Kevin McCarthy	Won re-election.	Democratic	Kevin McCarthy	9,412	
67	Democratic	Kevin McCarthy	Won re-election.	Republican	Larry Disney	5,204	
68	Democratic	Rick Olson	Won re-election.	Democratic	Rick Olson	8,671	
68	Democratic	Rick Olson	Won re-election.	Republican	Larry Voorhees	4,267	
69	Republican	Walt Tomenga		Republican	Erik Helland	14,228	
69	Republican	Walt Tomenga		Democratic	Richard Sosalla	9,111	
70	Republican	Carmine Boal		Republican	Kevin Koester	12,043	
70	Republican	Carmine Boal		Democratic	Matt Pfaltzgraf	10,355	
71	Republican	Jim Van Engelenhoven	Won re-election.	Republican	Jim Van Engelenhoven	9,442	
71	Republican	Jim Van Engelenhoven	Won re-election.	Democratic	Pat Vanzante	5,829	
72	Republican	Rich Arnold	Won re-election.	Republican	Rich Arnold	9,043	
72	Republican	Rich Arnold	Won re-election.	Democratic	James Demichelis, Jr.	4,409	
73	Republican	Jodi Tymeson	Won re-election.	Republican	Jodi Tymeson	10,498	
73	Republican	Jodi Tymeson	Won re-election.	Democratic	Maxine Bussanmas	6,548	
74	Democratic	Mark Davitt	Lost re-election.	Republican	Kent Sorenson	8,846	
74	Democratic	Mark Davitt	Lost re-election.	Democratic	Mark Davitt	8,683	
75	Democratic	Eric Palmer	Won re-election.	Democratic	Eric Palmer	8,115	
75	Democratic	Eric Palmer	Won re-election.	Republican	Danny Carroll	6,867	
76	Republican	Betty De Boef	Won re-election.	Republican	Betty De Boef	9,033	
76	Republican	Betty De Boef	Won re-election.	Democratic	Jim van Scoyoc	5,095	
77	Democratic	Mary Mascher	Won re-election.	Democratic	Mary Mascher	11,284	
77	Democratic	Mary Mascher	Won re-election.	Independent	Chris Brewer	2,421	
78	Democratic	Vicki Lensing	Won re-election.	Democratic	Vicki Lensing	15,702	
79	Republican	Jeff Kaufmann	Won re-election.	Republican	Jeff Kaufmann	9,456	
79	Republican	Jeff Kaufmann	Won re-election.	Democratic	Rebecca Spears	4,762	
80	Democratic	Nathan Reichert	Won re-election.	Democratic	Nathan Reichert	7,299	
80	Democratic	Nathan Reichert	Won re-election.	Republican	Robert Howard	5,812	
81	Republican	Jamie Van Fossen	Won re-election.	Republican	Jamie Van Fossen	8,736	
81	Republican	Jamie Van Fossen	Won re-election.	Democratic	Phyllis Thede	6,951	
82	Republican	Linda Miller	Won re-election.	Republican	Linda Miller	12,749	
83	Republican	Steven Olson	Won re-election.	Republican	Steven Olson	9,135	
83	Republican	Steven Olson	Won re-election.	Democratic	Steve Smith	7,078	
84	Democratic	Elesha Gayman	Won re-election.	Democratic	Elesha Gayman	8,397	
84	Democratic	Elesha Gayman	Won re-election.	Republican	Ross Paustian	7,593	
85	Democratic	Jim Lykam	Won re-election.	Democratic	Jim Lykam	9,892	
85	Democratic	Jim Lykam	Won re-election.	Republican	Linda Greenlee	5,330	
86	Democratic	Cindy Winckler	Won re-election.	Democratic	Cindy Winckler	7,645	
86	Democratic	Cindy Winckler	Won re-election.	Republican	Joseph Sturgis	3,370	
87	Republican	Tom Sands	Won re-election.	Republican	Tom Sands	6,949	
87	Republican	Tom Sands	Won re-election.	Democratic	Frank Best	6,115	
88	Democratic	Dennis Cohoon	Won re-election.	Democratic	Dennis Cohoon	10,248	
89	Republican	Sandy Greiner		Democratic	Larry Marek	7,315	
89	Republican	Sandy Greiner		Republican	Jarad Klein	7,158	
90	Democratic	John Whitaker	Won re-election.	Democratic	John Whitaker	10,694	
90	Democratic	John Whitaker	Won re-election.	4th of July Party	Dan Cesar	1,626	
91	Republican	Dave Heaton	Won re-election.	Republican	Dave Heaton	7,574	
91	Republican	Dave Heaton	Won re-election.	Democratic	Ron Fedler	5,549	
92	Democratic	Philip L. Wise		Democratic	Jerry Kearns	7,613	
92	Democratic	Philip L. Wise		Republican	Gary Ramaker	5,149	
93	Democratic	Mary Gaskill	Won re-election.	Democratic	Mary Gaskill	8,548	
93	Democratic	Mary Gaskill	Won re-election.	Independent	Rick McClure	2,768	
94	Democratic	Kurt Swaim	Won re-election.	Democratic	Kurt Swaim	8,112	
94	Democratic	Kurt Swaim	Won re-election.	Republican	Howard Hubbard	4,542	
95	Democratic	Mike Reasoner	Won re-election.	Democratic	Mike Reasoner	7,604	
95	Democratic	Mike Reasoner	Won re-election.	Republican	Doug Smith	5,905	
96	Republican	Cecil Dolecheck	Won re-election.	Republican	Cecil Dolecheck	7,840	
96	Republican	Cecil Dolecheck	Won re-election.	Democratic	Dennis Cooper	5,269	
97	Republican	Rich Anderson	Won re-election.	Republican	Rich Anderson	10,752	
98	Republican	Greg Forristall	Won re-election.	Republican	Greg Forristall	13,167	
99	Republican	Doug Struyk	Won re-election.	Republican	Doug Struyk	5,757	
99	Republican	Doug Struyk	Won re-election.	Democratic	Kurt Hubler	5,387	
100	Democratic	Paul Shomshor	Won re-election.	Democratic	Paul Shomshor	6,208	
100	Democratic	Paul Shomshor	Won re-election.	Republican	Scott Belt	5,653	

== See also ==
- Iowa Senate
- Iowa House of Representatives
- Iowa Senate elections, 2008
- Iowa General Assembly
- Political party strength in U.S. states
