= 2006 Iowa House of Representatives election =

- November 7, 2006

All 100 seats in the Iowa House of Representatives 51 seats needed for a majority
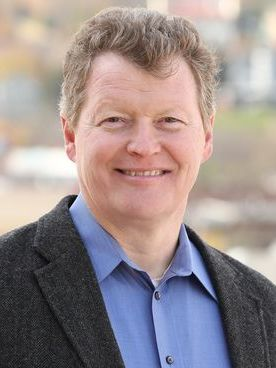

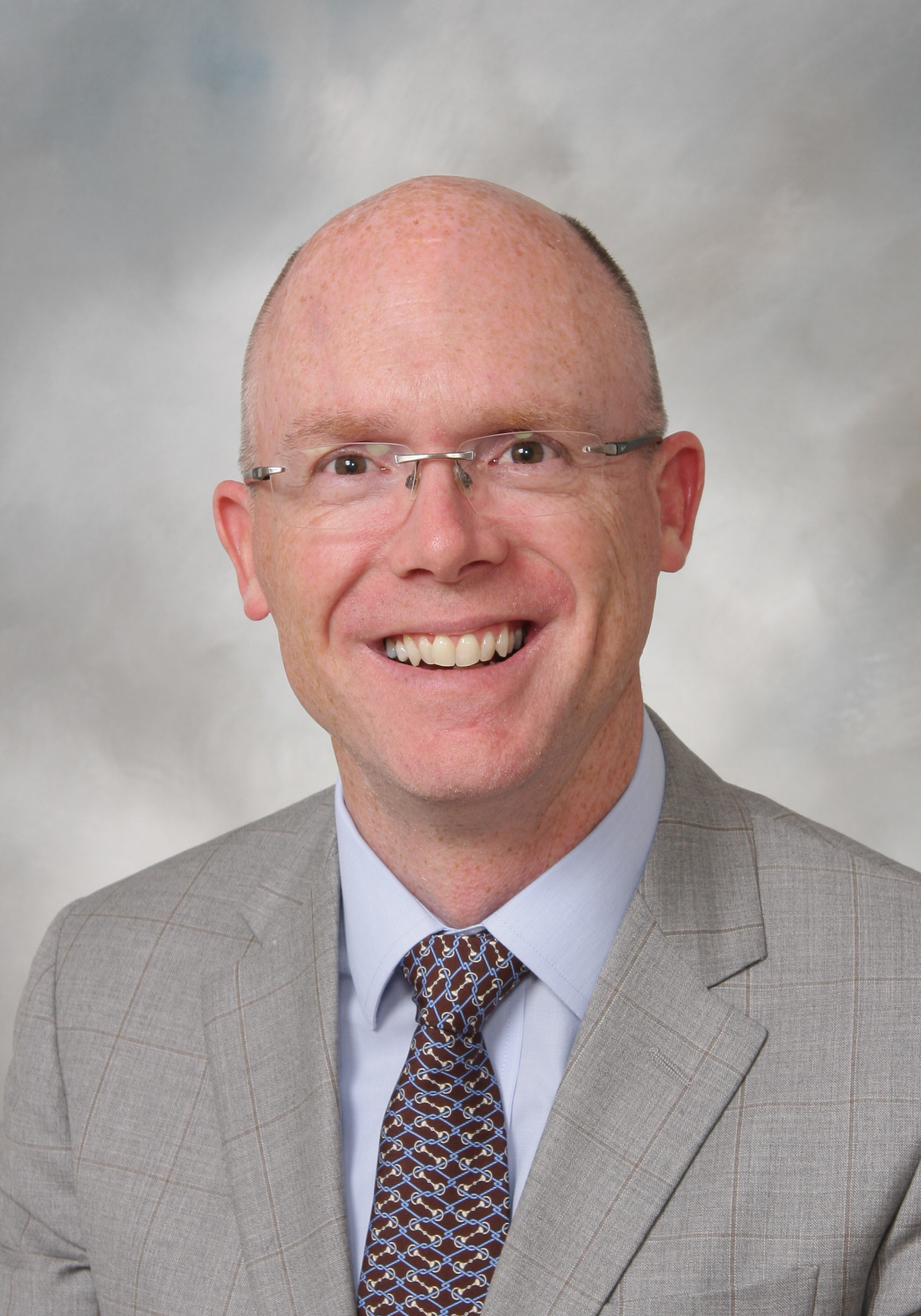
	Majority party	Minority party
Leader	Pat Murphy	Christopher Rants
Party	Democratic	Republican
Leader since	January 4, 2003	January 4, 2003
Leader's seat	28th district	54th district
Last election	49	51
Seats after	54	46
Seat change	▲5	▼5
- Republican gain Democratic gain Republican hold Democratic hold
Speaker of the House before election
Christopher Rants
Republican
Elected Speaker of the House
Pat Murphy
Democratic

There were two sets of 2006 Iowa House of Representatives elections. The first, the general election, was held on November 7. The second, a special election for District 52, was held on December 12. The representatives-elect from both sets of elections were inaugurated on January 3, 2007. The Iowa House, like the United States House of Representatives, is up for re-election in its entirety every two years. Prior to the elections, the Republicans were in the majority; following inauguration, the Democrats were in the majority – this marked the first time in 42 years that the Democrats had controlled both branches of the Iowa General Assembly and the Governor's Office at the same time.

== House composition ==
2006 General Elections
Democratic held and uncontested	22
Contested	60
Republican held and uncontested	18
Total	100

2006 Special Election
Contested	1
Total	1

== Predictions ==
Source	Ranking	As of
Rothenberg	Tossup	November 4, 2006

== General election results ==
Final results from the Iowa Secretary of State:
* indicates incumbent

=== District 1 ===
2006 House District 1 election
Party	Candidate	Votes	%	±%
Democratic	Wesley Whitead*	5,079	63.0%	
Republican	Jamie Simmons	2,980	37.0%	
Total votes		8,062	100.0%	

=== District 2 ===
2006 House District 2 election
Party	Candidate	Votes	%	±%
Democratic	Roger F. Wendt*	4,212	98.9%	
Total votes		4,259	100.0%	

=== District 3 ===
2006 House District 3 election
Party	Candidate	Votes	%	±%
Republican	Chuck Soderberg*	7,806	99.8%	
Total votes		7,825	100.0%	

=== District 4 ===
2006 House District 4 election
Party	Candidate	Votes	%	±%
Republican	Dwayne Alons*	9,743	99.7%	
Total votes		9,768	100.0%	

=== District 5 ===
2006 House District 5 election
Party	Candidate	Votes	%	±%
Republican	Royd E. Chambers*	7,736	81.6%	
Total votes		9,484	100.0%	

=== District 6 ===
2006 House District 6 election
Party	Candidate	Votes	%	±%
Republican	Mike May*	8,281	73.1%	
Total votes		11,331	100.0%	

=== District 7 ===
2006 House District 7 election
Party	Candidate	Votes	%	±%
Democratic	Marcella R. Frevert*	7,335	74.2%	
Total votes		9,880	100.0%	

=== District 8 ===
2006 House District 8 election
Party	Candidate	Votes	%	±%
Democratic	Dolores M. Mertz*	8,142	75.5%	
Total votes		10,783	100.0%	

=== District 9 ===
2006 House District 9 election
Party	Candidate	Votes	%	±%
Democratic	McKinley Bailey	5,685	54.7%	
Republican	George Eichhorn*	4,610	44.3%	
Total votes		10,396	100.0%	

=== District 10 ===
2006 House District 10 election
Party	Candidate	Votes	%	±%
Republican	Dave Deyoe	6,358	52.5%	
Democratic	Susan R. Radke	5,678	46.9%	
Total votes		12,103	100.0%	

=== District 11 ===
2006 House District 11 election
Party	Candidate	Votes	%	±%
Republican	Henry V. Rayhons*	5,933	55.1%	
Democratic	Ann Fairchild	4,388	40.8%	
Total votes		10,768	100.0%	

=== District 12 ===
2006 House District 12 election
Party	Candidate	Votes	%	±%
Republican	Linda Upmeyer*	8,014	79.7%	
Total votes		10,051	100.0%	

=== District 13 ===
2006 House District 13 election
Party	Candidate	Votes	%	±%
Republican	Bill Schickel*	5,433	51.0%	
Democratic	Alan Steckman	4,616	43.4%	
Independent	Gary van Horn	540	5.1%	
Total votes		10,644	100.0%	

=== District 14 ===
2006 House District 14 election
Party	Candidate	Votes	%	±%
Democratic	Mark A. Kuhn*	8,154	75.3%	
Independent	Darwin J. Rieman	1,338	12.4%	
Total votes		10,829	100.0%	

=== District 15 ===
2006 House District 15 election
Party	Candidate	Votes	%	±%
Democratic	Brian J. Quirk*	7,147	67.7%	
Republican	David Kraft	3,184	30.2%	
Total votes		10,556	100.0%	

=== District 16 ===
2006 House District 16 election
Party	Candidate	Votes	%	±%
Republican	Chuck Gipp*	5,782	59.3%	
Democratic	Thomas Hansen	3,960	40.6%	
Total votes		9,747	100.0%	

=== District 17 ===
2006 House District 17 election
Party	Candidate	Votes	%	±%
Republican	Pat Grassley	6,553	55.5%	
Democratic	Alek Wipperman	5,039	42.7%	
Total votes		11,798	100.0%	

=== District 18 ===
2006 House District 18 election
Party	Candidate	Votes	%	±%
Democratic	Andrew Wenthe	6,160	56.0%	
Republican	David Lalk*	4,783	43.5%	
Total votes		11,004	100.0%	

=== District 19 ===
2006 House District 19 election
Party	Candidate	Votes	%	±%
Democratic	Bob Kressig*	5,174	50.5%	
Republican	Matt Reisetter	5,065	49.4%	
Total votes		10,243	100.0%	

=== District 20 ===
2006 House District 20 election
Party	Candidate	Votes	%	±%
Democratic	Doris J. Kelley	6,344	51.5%	
Republican	David Wieland	5,947	48.3%	
Total votes		12,308	100.0%	

=== District 21 ===
2006 House District 21 election
Party	Candidate	Votes	%	±%
Republican	Tami Wiencek	4,802	51.5%	
Democratic	Don Shoultz*	4,504	48.3%	
Total votes		9,318	100.0%	

=== District 22 ===
2006 House District 22 election
Party	Candidate	Votes	%	±%
Democratic	Deborah L. Berry*	5,985	77.1%	
Republican	Michael Anthony	1,759	22.6%	
Total votes		7,767	100.0%	

=== District 23 ===
2006 House District 23 election
Party	Candidate	Votes	%	±%
Republican	Dan Rasmussen*	5,716	51.4%	
Democratic	Pete McRoberts	5,217	46.9%	
Total votes		11,131	100.0%	

=== District 24 ===
2006 House District 24 election
Party	Candidate	Votes	%	±%
Democratic	Roger Thomas*	7,820	99.5%	
Total votes		7,858	100.0%	

=== District 25 ===
2006 House District 25 election
Party	Candidate	Votes	%	±%
Democratic	Thomas J. Schueller*	6,355	59.9%	
Republican	David Bevan Kendell	3,971	37.7%	
Total votes		10,606	100.0%	

=== District 26 ===
2006 House District 26 election
Party	Candidate	Votes	%	±%
Democratic	Polly Bukta*	5,536	59.6%	
Republican	Lester A. Shields	3,595	38.7%	
Total votes		9,281	100.0%	

=== District 27 ===
2006 House District 27 election
Party	Candidate	Votes	%	±%
Democratic	Pam Jochum*	7,405	70.7%	
Republican	John Hulsizer, Jr.	2,739	26.1%	
Total votes		10,477	100.0%	

=== District 28 ===
2006 House District 28 election
Party	Candidate	Votes	%	±%
Democratic	Pat Murphy*	7,417	72.5%	
Total votes		10,231	100.0%	

=== District 29 ===
2006 House District 29 election
Party	Candidate	Votes	%	±%
Democratic	Ro Foege*	8,055	59.9%	
Republican	Emma Nemecek	5,145	38.3%	
Total votes		13,442	100.0%	

=== District 30 ===
2006 House District 30 election
Party	Candidate	Votes	%	±%
Democratic	Dave Jacoby*	9,639	74.3%	
Total votes		12,981	100.0%	

=== District 31 ===
2006 House District 31 election
Party	Candidate	Votes	%	±%
Democratic	Raymond Zirkelbach*	8,447	74.4%	
Total votes		11,352	100.0%	

=== District 32 ===
2006 House District 32 election
Party	Candidate	Votes	%	±%
Republican	Steven F. Lukan*	8,183	66.5%	
Democratic	Tom Avenarius	3,913	31.8%	
Total votes		12,313	100.0%	

=== District 33 ===
2006 House District 33 election
Party	Candidate	Votes	%	±%
Democratic	Dick Taylor*	6,760	99.5%	
Total votes		6,796	100.0%	

=== District 34 ===
2006 House District 34 election
Party	Candidate	Votes	%	±%
Democratic	Todd Taylor*	7,312	66.9%	
Republican	David Gochenouer	3,608	33.0%	
Total votes		10,929	100.0%	

=== District 35 ===
2006 House District 35 election
Party	Candidate	Votes	%	±%
Republican	Kraig Paulsen*	7,083	53.8%	
Democratic	Jan Kvach	6,085	46.2%	
Total votes		13,174	100.0%	

=== District 36 ===
2006 House District 36 election
Party	Candidate	Votes	%	±%
Democratic	Swati A. Dandekar*	6,987	52.6%	
Republican	Nick Wagner	6,302	47.4%	
Total votes		13,293	100.0%	

=== District 37 ===
2006 House District 37 election
Party	Candidate	Votes	%	±%
Democratic	Art Staed	6,462	51.4%	
Republican	Andy Anderson	6,097	48.5%	
Total votes		12,569	100.0%	

=== District 38 ===
2006 House District 38 election
Party	Candidate	Votes	%	±%
Democratic	Tyler Olson	7,148	64.7%	
Republican	Don Palmer	3,894	35.3%	
Total votes		11,045	100.0%	

=== District 39 ===
2006 House District 39 election
Party	Candidate	Votes	%	±%
Democratic	Dawn Pettengill*	6,365	56.3%	
Republican	Connie Jacobsen	4,759	42.1%	
Total votes		11,296	100.0%	

=== District 40 ===
2006 House District 40 election
Party	Candidate	Votes	%	±%
Republican	Lance J. Horbach*	6,249	54.8%	
Democratic	Sharon Owens	4,994	43.8%	
Total votes		11,404	100.0%	

=== District 41 ===
2006 House District 41 election
Party	Candidate	Votes	%	±%
Democratic	Paul Bell*	7,303	63.4%	
Republican	Adam Vandall	4,215	36.6%	
Total votes		11,524	100.0%	

=== District 42 ===
2006 House District 42 election
Party	Candidate	Votes	%	±%
Democratic	Geri Huser*	8,493	98.0%	
Total votes		8,663	100.0%	

=== District 43 ===
2006 House District 43 election
Party	Candidate	Votes	%	±%
Democratic	Mark Smith*	7,097	73.4%	
Total votes		9,664	100.0%	

=== District 44 ===
2006 House District 44 election
Party	Candidate	Votes	%	±%
Republican	Polly Granzow*	5,559	50.4%	
Democratic	Tim Hoy	5,298	48.0%	
Total votes		11,027	100.0%	

=== District 45 ===
2006 House District 45 election
Party	Candidate	Votes	%	±%
Democratic	Beth Wessel-Kroeschell*	5,473	98.7%	
Total votes		5,544	100.0%	

=== District 46 ===
2006 House District 46 election
Party	Candidate	Votes	%	±%
Democratic	Lisa Heddens*	8,371	63.3%	
Republican	John E. Griswold	4,508	34.1%	
Libertarian	Eric Cooper	345	2.6%	
Total votes		13,227	100.0%	

=== District 47 ===
2006 House District 47 election
Party	Candidate	Votes	%	±%
Republican	Ralph Watts*	8,313	51.7%	
Democratic	Russ Wiesley	7,242	45.0%	
Total votes		16,093	100.0%	

=== District 48 ===
2006 House District 48 election
Party	Candidate	Votes	%	±%
Democratic	Donovan Olson*	6,145	61.2%	
Republican	Charles Braun	3,856	38.4%	
Total votes		10,046	100.0%	

=== District 49 ===
2006 House District 49 election
Party	Candidate	Votes	%	±%
Democratic	Helen Miller*	7,709	79.2%	
Total votes		9,732	100.0%	

=== District 50 ===
2006 House District 50 election
Party	Candidate	Votes	%	±%
Republican	David A. Tjepkes*	5,493	54.5%	
Democratic	Lynne R. Gentry	4,351	43.2%	
Total votes		10,073	100.0%	

=== District 51 ===
2006 House District 51 election
Party	Candidate	Votes	%	±%
Republican	Rod Roberts*	6,564	91.6%	
Total votes		7,167	100.0%	

=== District 52 ===
2006 House District 52 election
Party	Candidate	Votes	%	±%
Republican	Mary Lou Freeman*	0	100.0%	
Total votes		0	100.0%	

=== District 53 ===
2006 House District 53 election
Party	Candidate	Votes	%	±%
Republican	Dan Huseman*	7,465	99.6%	
Total votes		7,494	100.0%	

=== District 54 ===
2006 House District 54 election
Party	Candidate	Votes	%	±%
Republican	Christopher Rants*	5,959	97.2%	
Total votes		6,129	100.0%	

=== District 55 ===
2006 House District 55 election
Party	Candidate	Votes	%	±%
Republican	Clarence C. Hoffman*	6,297	77.0%	
Total votes		8,177	100.0%	

=== District 56 ===
2006 House District 56 election
Party	Candidate	Votes	%	±%
Republican	Matt W. Windschitl	4,993	50.3%	
Democratic	Nancy Bleth	4,436	45.3%	
Total votes		9,803	100.0%	

=== District 57 ===
2006 House District 57 election
Party	Candidate	Votes	%	±%
Republican	Jack Drake*	7,255	73.5%	
Total votes		9,870	100.0%	

=== District 58 ===
2006 House District 58 election
Party	Candidate	Votes	%	±%
Republican	Clel Baudler*	7,428	86.3%	
Total votes		8,611	100.0%	

=== District 59 ===
2006 House District 59 election
Party	Candidate	Votes	%	±%
Republican	Dan Clute	7,250	57.8%	
Democratic	Jim Sammler	5,293	42.2%	
Total votes		12,554	100.0%	

=== District 60 ===
2006 House District 60 election
Party	Candidate	Votes	%	±%
Republican	Libby Jacobs*	7,849	98.2%	
Total votes		7,990	100.0%	

=== District 61 ===
2006 House District 61 election
Party	Candidate	Votes	%	±%
Democratic	Jo Oldson*	7,893	66.6%	
Republican	David Payer	3,945	33.3%	
Total votes		11,852	100.0%	

=== District 62 ===
2006 House District 62 election
Party	Candidate	Votes	%	±%
Democratic	Bruce Hunter*	6,040	98.8%	
Total votes		6,112	100.0%	

=== District 63 ===
2006 House District 63 election
Party	Candidate	Votes	%	±%
Republican	Scott Raecker*	9,607	98.5%	
Total votes		9,755	100.0%	

=== District 64 ===
2006 House District 64 election
Party	Candidate	Votes	%	±%
Democratic	Janet Petersen*	8,561	98.5%	
Total votes		8,690	100.0%	

=== District 65 ===
2006 House District 65 election
Party	Candidate	Votes	%	±%
Democratic	Wayne W. Ford*	5,405	98.0%	
Total votes		5,514	100.0%	

=== District 66 ===
2006 House District 66 election
Party	Candidate	Votes	%	±%
Democratic	Ako Abdul-Samad	3,459	61.0%	
Republican	Jack Whitver	1,566	27.6%	
Independent	Jeff Johannsen	398	7.0%	
Libertarian	Brett Blanchfield	225	4.0%	
Total votes		5,672	100.0%	

=== District 67 ===
2006 House District 67 election
Party	Candidate	Votes	%	±%
Democratic	Kevin McCarthy*	5,656	60.6%	
Republican	Steven Inman	3,191	34.2%	
Independent	Brian McLain	487	5.2%	
Total votes		9,339	100.0%	

=== District 68 ===
2006 House District 68 election
Party	Candidate	Votes	%	±%
Democratic	Rick L. Olson*	6,472	98.4%	
Total votes		6,577	100.0%	

=== District 69 ===
2006 House District 69 election
Party	Candidate	Votes	%	±%
Republican	Walt Tomenga*	8,758	55.2%	
Democratic	John Calhoun	7,108	44.8%	
Total votes		15,876	100.0%	

=== District 70 ===
2006 House District 70 election
Party	Candidate	Votes	%	±%
Republican	Carmine Boal*	10,945	98.1%	
Total votes		11,156	100.0%	

=== District 71 ===
2006 House District election
Party	Candidate	Votes	%	±%
Republican	Jim Van Engelenhoven*	6,587	57.3%	
Democratic	Catherine Haustein	4,271	37.2%	
Independent	Steve Woody Fisher	324	2.8%	
Total votes		11,490	100.0%	

=== District 72 ===
2006 House District 72 election
Party	Candidate	Votes	%	±%
Republican	Richard D. Arnold*	6,117	59.9%	
Democratic	Buzz Malone	3,833	37.6%	
Total votes		10,206	100.0%	

=== District 73 ===
2006 House District 73 election
Party	Candidate	Votes	%	±%
Republican	Jodi Tymeson*	7,523	58.3%	
Democratic	Maxine R. Bussanmas	5,084	39.4%	
Total votes		12,899	100.0%	

=== District 74 ===
2006 House District 74 election
Party	Candidate	Votes	%	±%
Democratic	Mark Davitt*	6,439	51.4%	
Republican	Doug Shull	5,802	46.3%	
Total votes		12,531	100.0%	

=== District 75 ===
2006 House District 75 election
Party	Candidate	Votes	%	±%
Democratic	Eric J. Palmer	5,728	52.7%	
Republican	Danny Carroll*	5,037	46.3%	
Total votes		10,869	100.0%	

=== District 76 ===
2006 House District 76 election
Party	Candidate	Votes	%	±%
Republican	Betty R. De Boef*	5,819	53.5%	
Democratic	Christopher L. Montross	4,598	42.3%	
Total votes		10,871	100.0%	

=== District 77 ===
2006 House District 77 election
Party	Candidate	Votes	%	±%
Democratic	Mary Mascher*	6,236	79.7%	
Total votes		7,823	100.0%	

=== District 78 ===
2006 House District 78 election
Party	Candidate	Votes	%	±%
Democratic	Vicki Lensing*	11,000	80.5%	
Total votes		13,669	100.0%	

=== District 79 ===
2006 House District 79 election
Party	Candidate	Votes	%	±%
Republican	Jeff Kaufmann*	6,311	62.5%	
Democratic	Clara Oleson	3,745	37.1%	
Total votes		10,101	100.0%	

=== District 80 ===
2006 House District 80 election
Party	Candidate	Votes	%	±%
Democratic	Nathan K. Reichert*	5,245	59.9%	
Republican	R. Greg Orr	3,421	39.0%	
Total votes		8,761	100.0%	

=== District 81 ===
2006 House District 81 election
Party	Candidate	Votes	%	±%
Republican	Jamie Van Fossen*	5,501	51.1%	
Democratic	Lauren M. Phelps	4,934	45.9%	
Total votes		10,760	100.0%	

=== District 82 ===
2006 House District 82 election
Party	Candidate	Votes	%	±%
Republican	Linda J. Miller	6,931	54.1%	
Independent	Joe Hutter*	3,307	25.8%	
Total votes		12,818	100.0%	

=== District 83 ===
2006 House District 83 election
Party	Candidate	Votes	%	±%
Republican	Steven Olson*	6,488	56.5%	
Democratic	Reg. Kauffman	4,621	40.3%	
Total votes		11,477	100.0%	

=== District 84 ===
2006 House District 84 election
Party	Candidate	Votes	%	±%
Democratic	Elesha Gayman	5,429	50.1%	
Republican	Jim Van Fossen*	5,156	47.6%	
Total votes		10,839	100.0%	

=== District 85 ===
2006 House District 85 election
Party	Candidate	Votes	%	±%
Democratic	Jim Lykam*	5,623	54.3%	
Republican	Roby Smith	4,515	43.6%	
Total votes		10,355	100.0%	

=== District 86 ===
2006 House District 86 election
Party	Candidate	Votes	%	±%
Democratic	Cindy L. Winckler*	4,598	69.1%	
Republican	Susie Bell	1,792	26.9%	
Total votes		6,657	100.0%	

=== District 87 ===
2006 House District 87 election
Party	Candidate	Votes	%	±%
Republican	Thomas R. Sands*	5,118	55.0%	
Democratic	Andrew Hoth	4,148	44.5%	
Total votes		9,312	100.0%	

=== District 88 ===
2006 House District 88 election
Party	Candidate	Votes	%	±%
Democratic	Dennis M. Cohoon*	7,201	99.3%	
Total votes		7,251	100.0%	

=== District 89 ===
2006 House District 89 election
Party	Candidate	Votes	%	±%
Republican	Sandra H. Greiner*	5,756	54.9%	
Democratic	Mark Nolte	4,606	43.9%	
Total votes		10,488	100.0%	

=== District 90 ===
2006 House District 90 election
Party	Candidate	Votes	%	±%
Democratic	John Whitaker*	7,827	78.9%	
Total votes		9,919	100.0%	

=== District 91 ===
2006 House District 91 election
Party	Candidate	Votes	%	±%
Republican	Dave Heaton*	6,726	71.9%	
Total votes		9,355	100.0%	

=== District 92 ===
2006 House District 92 election
Party	Candidate	Votes	%	±%
Democratic	Philip Wise*	6,532	74.7%	
Total votes		8,746	100.0%	

=== District 93 ===
2006 House District 93 election
Party	Candidate	Votes	%	±%
Democratic	Mary Gaskill*	7,210	99.1%	
Total votes		7,273	100.0%	

=== District 94 ===
2006 House District 94 election
Party	Candidate	Votes	%	±%
Democratic	Kurt Swaim*	6,052	64.1%	
Republican	Kevin Wiskus	3,377	35.8%	
Total votes		9,436	100.0%	

=== District 95 ===
2006 House District 95 election
Party	Candidate	Votes	%	±%
Democratic	Michael J. Reasoner*	6,316	63.6%	
Republican	George Barber	3,499	35.2%	
Total votes		9,934	100.0%	

=== District 96 ===
2006 House District 96 election
Party	Candidate	Votes	%	±%
Republican	Cecil Dolecheck*	7,312	99.2%	
Total votes		7,374	100.0%	

=== District 97 ===
2006 House District 97 election
Party	Candidate	Votes	%	±%
Republican	Rich Anderson*	6,464	94.7%	
Total votes		6,825	100.0%	

=== District 98 ===
2006 House District 98 election
Party	Candidate	Votes	%	±%
Republican	Greg Forristall	6,570	60.7%	
Democratic	Sally Vitamvas	3,858	35.7%	
Total votes		10,817	100.0%	

=== District 99 ===
2006 House District 99 election
Party	Candidate	Votes	%	±%
Republican	Doug L. Struyk*	3,466	53.0%	
Democratic	Will Reger	2,926	44.7%	
Total votes		6,539	100.0%	

=== District 100 ===
2006 House District 100 election
Party	Candidate	Votes	%	±%
Democratic	Paul Shomshor*	3,568	51.8%	
Republican	Scott A. Bell	3,211	46.6%	
Total votes		6,890	100.0%	

== Special election results ==
Final results from KCCI Channel 8 – Des Moines:

=== District 52 ===
2006 House District 52 special election
Party	Candidate	Votes	%	±%
Republican	Gary Worthan	2,003		
Democratic	Kate Logan	791		
Total votes				

== See also ==
- Iowa Senate
- Iowa House of Representatives
- Iowa Senate elections, 2006
- Iowa General Assembly
- Political party strength in U.S. states
