= Steven Olson =

American politician (born 1947)

Steven N. Olson
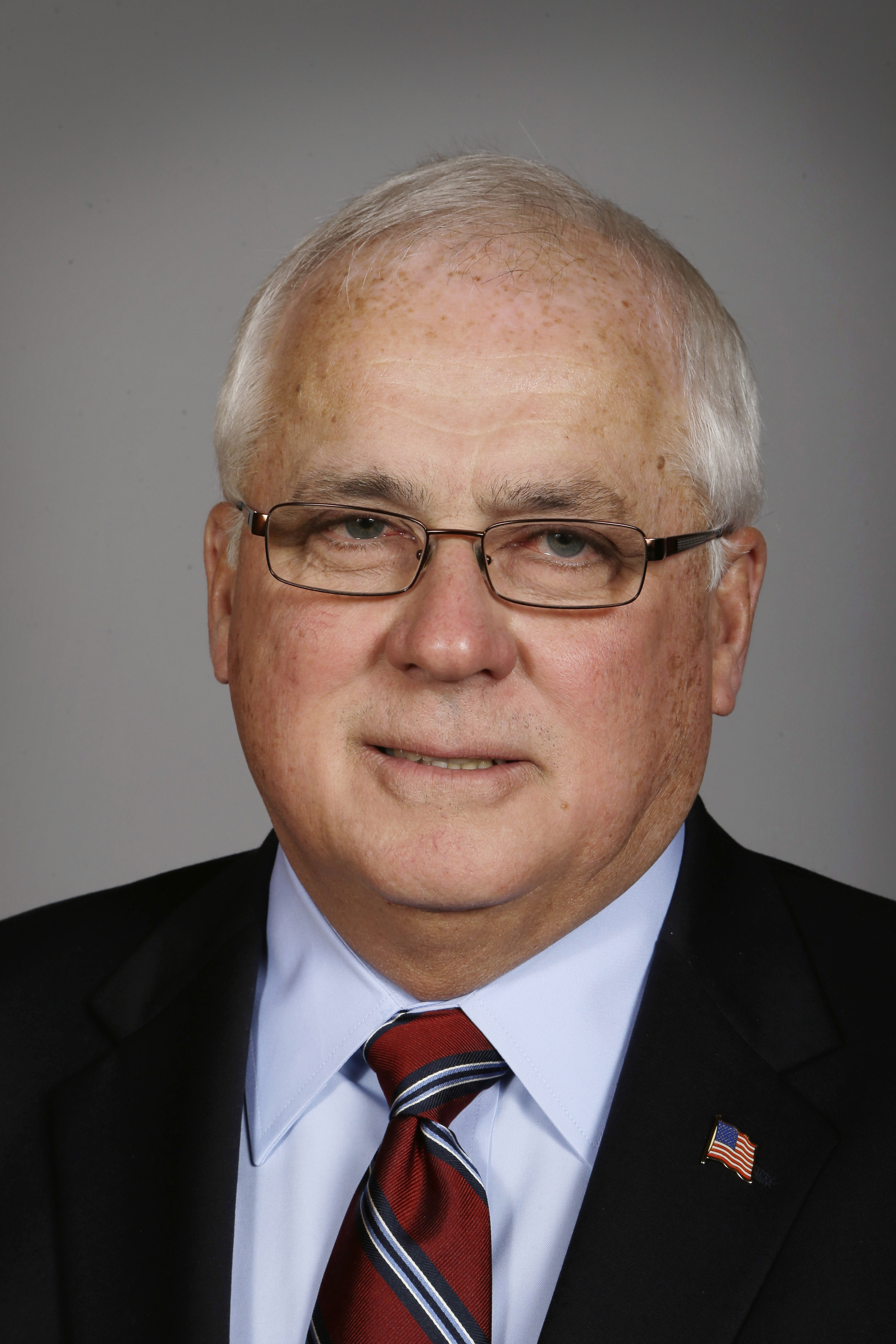

Member of the Iowa House of Representatives from the 83rd district
- Incumbent
- Assumed office January 13, 2003
- Preceded by: Brad Hansen

Personal details
- Born: January 30, 1947 (age 79) Clinton, Iowa, U.S.
- Party: Republican
- Website: Olson's website

Steven N. Olson (born January 30, 1947) is the Iowa State Representative from the 83rd District. A Republican, he has served in the Iowa House of Representatives since 2003.

As of October 2011, Olson serves on several committees in the Iowa House - the Agriculture and Public Safety committees and the Environmental Protection committee, where he is the chair. His political experience includes serving as assistant majority leader in the Iowa House.

== Electoral history ==
*incumbent

Election	Political result	Candidate	Party	Votes	%
Iowa House of Representatives primary elections, 2002; District 83; Turnout: 1,601	Republican (newly redistricted)	Steven N. Olson	Republican	1,120	70.0
Iowa House of Representatives primary elections, 2002; District 83; Turnout: 1,601	Republican (newly redistricted)	Cindy Corson	Republican	481	30.0
Iowa House of Representatives elections, 2002; District 83; Turnout: 10,125	Republican (newly redistricted)	Steven N. Olson	Republican	5,724	56.5
Iowa House of Representatives elections, 2002; District 83; Turnout: 10,125	Republican (newly redistricted)	Mark Henderson	Democratic	4,396	43.4
Iowa House of Representatives elections, 2004; District 83; Turnout: 14,785	Republican hold	Steven Olson*	Republican	8,998	60.9
Iowa House of Representatives elections, 2004; District 83; Turnout: 14,785	Republican hold	Jim King	Democratic	5,780	39.1
Iowa House of Representatives elections, 2006; District 83; Turnout: 11,477	Republican hold	Steven Olson*	Republican	6,488	56.5
Iowa House of Representatives elections, 2006; District 83; Turnout: 11,477	Republican hold	Reg. Kaufmann	Democratic	4,621	40.3
Iowa House of Representatives elections, 2008; District 83; Turnout: 16,222	Republican hold	Steven N. Olson*	Republican	9,135	56.3
Iowa House of Representatives elections, 2008; District 83; Turnout: 16,222	Republican hold	Steve Smith	Democratic	7,078	43.6
Iowa House of Representatives elections, 2010; District 83	Republican hold	Steven N. Olson*	Republican	unopposed	

Iowa House of Representatives
Preceded by Brad Hansen	83rd District; 2003 – present	Succeeded by Incumbent
