= Kurt Swaim =

American politician

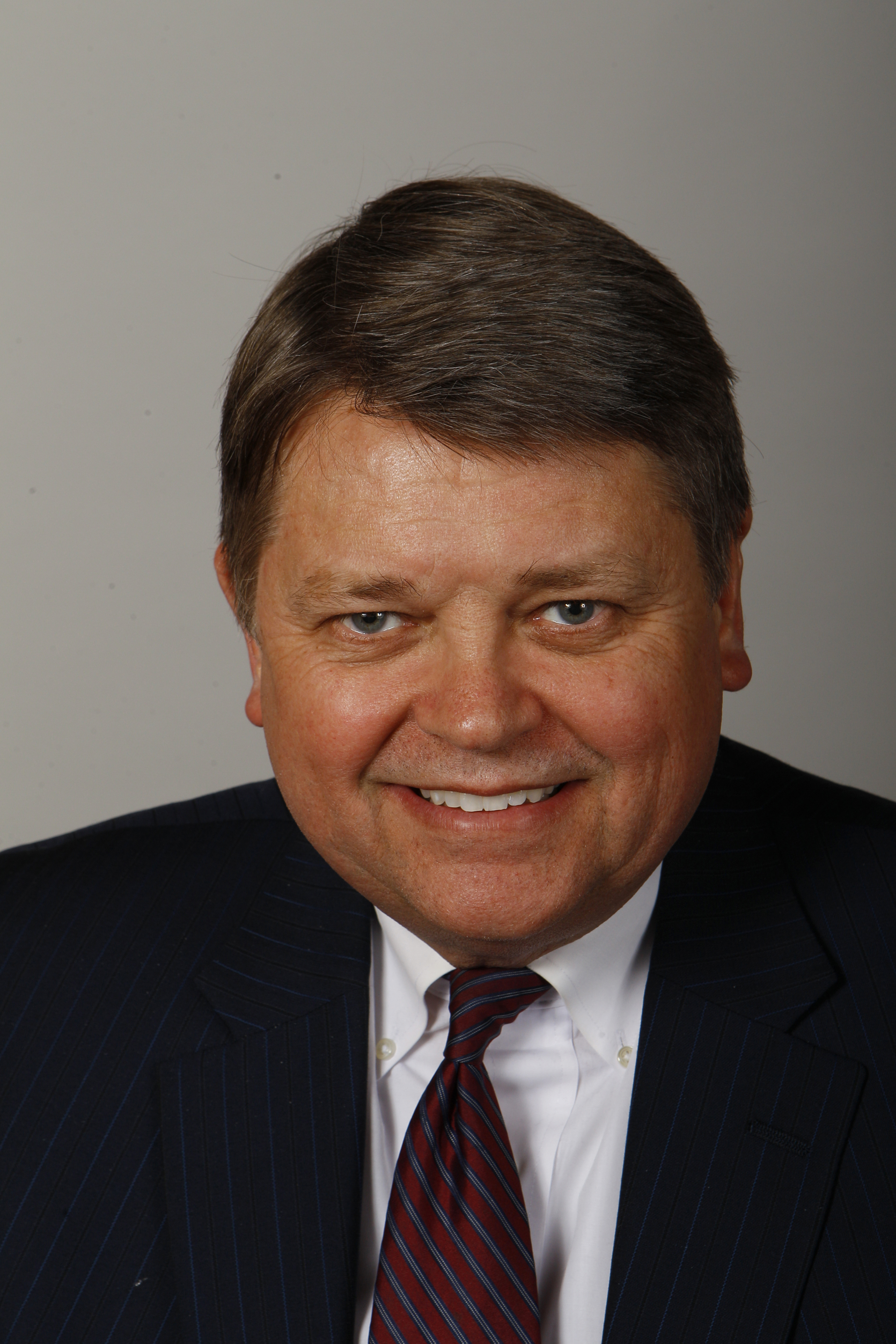

Member of the Iowa House of Representatives from the 94th district
- In office January 13, 2003 – January 13, 2013
- Preceded by: Rebecca Reynolds
- Succeeded by: Linda Miller

Personal details
- Born: 1950 (age 75–76) Drakesville, Iowa, U.S.
- Party: Democratic
- Website: Swaim's website

Kurt Swaim (born 1950) is the Iowa State Representative from the 94th District. He served in the Iowa House of Representatives since 2003.

As of October 2011, Swaim served on several committees in the Iowa House - the Agriculture, Commerce, and Public Safety committees. He also served as the ranking member of the Judiciary committee and as a member of the Child Support Advisory Committee.

Swaim is a member of the Davis County, Iowa Hall of Fame.

== Electoral history ==
*incumbent

Election	Political result	Candidate	Party	Votes	%
Iowa House of Representatives primary elections, 2002; District 94; Turnout: 1,892	Democratic (newly redistricted)	Kurt Swaim	Democratic	979	51.7
Iowa House of Representatives primary elections, 2002; District 94; Turnout: 1,892	Democratic (newly redistricted)	Marcella Forsythe Thompson	Democratic	471	24.9
Iowa House of Representatives primary elections, 2002; District 94; Turnout: 1,892	Democratic (newly redistricted)	Matt Greiner	Democratic	441	23.3
Iowa House of Representatives election, 2002; District 94; Turnout: 10,116	Democratic (newly redistricted)	Kurt Swaim	Democratic	5,224	51.6
Iowa House of Representatives election, 2002; District 94; Turnout: 10,116	Democratic (newly redistricted)	Gerald E. Banks	Republican	4,892	48.4
Iowa House of Representatives election, 2004; District 94; Turnout: 12,885	Democratic hold	Kurt Swaim*	Democratic	7,655	59.4
Iowa House of Representatives election, 2004; District 94; Turnout: 12,885	Democratic hold	Claude Neill	Republican	5,227	40.6
Iowa House of Representatives election, 2006; District 94; Turnout: 9,436	Democratic hold	Kurt Swaim*	Democratic	6,052	64.1
Iowa House of Representatives election, 2006; District 94; Turnout: 9,436	Democratic hold	Kevin Wiskus	Republican	3,377	35.8
Iowa House of Representatives election, 2008; District 94; Turnout: 12,672	Democratic hold	Kurt Swaim*	Democratic	8,112	64.0
Iowa House of Representatives election, 2008; District 94; Turnout: 12,672	Democratic hold	Howard E. Hubbard	Republican	4,542	35.8
Iowa House of Representatives election, 2010; District 94; Turnout: 10,167	Democratic hold	Kurt Swaim*	Democratic	5,021	49.4
Iowa House of Representatives election, 2010; District 94; Turnout: 10,167	Democratic hold	James F. Johnson	Republican	4,945	48.6

Iowa House of Representatives
Preceded by Rebecca Reynolds	94th district 2003–2013	Succeeded by Linda Miller
