= Nathan Reichert =

American politician

Nathan K. Reichert
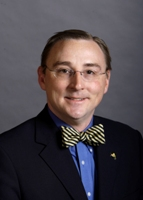

Member of the Iowa House of Representatives from the 80th district
- In office January 10, 2005 – January 9, 2011
- Preceded by: James Hahn
- Succeeded by: Mark Lofgren

Personal details
- Party: Democratic
- Spouse: Rebecca
- Education: University of Iowa
- Website: Reichert's website

Nathan K. Reichert is a former Iowa State Representative from the 80th District. A Democrat, he served in the Iowa House of Representatives from 2005 to 2011. He received his BA from the University of Northern Colorado and MBA from the University of Iowa.

During his last term in the Iowa House, Reichert served on the Appropriations, Commerce committee, Environmental protection, and the Public Safety committees. He also served as chair of the Agriculture and Natural Resources Appropriations Subcommittee and as a member of the Administrative Rules Review Committee, the Community College Working Group of Stakeholders, the Iowa Power Fund Board, and the Renewable Fuels and Coproducts Advisory Committee.

== Electoral history ==
*incumbent

Election	Political result	Candidate	Party	Votes	%
Iowa House of Representatives elections, 2004; District 80; Turnout: 12,759	Democratic gain from Republican	Nathan Reichert	Democratic	6,654	52.2
Iowa House of Representatives elections, 2004; District 80; Turnout: 12,759	Democratic gain from Republican	Barry D. Brauns	Republican	6,098	47.8
Iowa House of Representatives elections, 2006; District 80; Turnout: 8,761	Democratic hold	Nathan K. Reichert*	Democratic	5,245	59.9
Iowa House of Representatives elections, 2006; District 80; Turnout: 8,761	Democratic hold	R. Greg Orr	Republican	3,421	39.0
Iowa House of Representatives elections, 2008; District 80; Turnout: 13,115	Democratic hold	Nathan K. Reichert*	Democratic	7,299	55.7
Iowa House of Representatives elections, 2008; District 80; Turnout: 13,115	Democratic hold	Robert E. Howard	Republican	5,812	44.3
Iowa House of Representatives elections, 2010; District 80; Turnout: 9,592	Republican gain from Democratic	Mark S. Lofgren	Republican	5,458	56.9
Iowa House of Representatives elections, 2010; District 80; Turnout: 9,592	Republican gain from Democratic	Nathan K. Reichert*	Democratic	4,014	41.8

Iowa House of Representatives
Preceded by James Hahn	80th District; 2005 – 2011	Succeeded by Mark Lofgren
