= Gary Worthan =

American politician (born 1954)

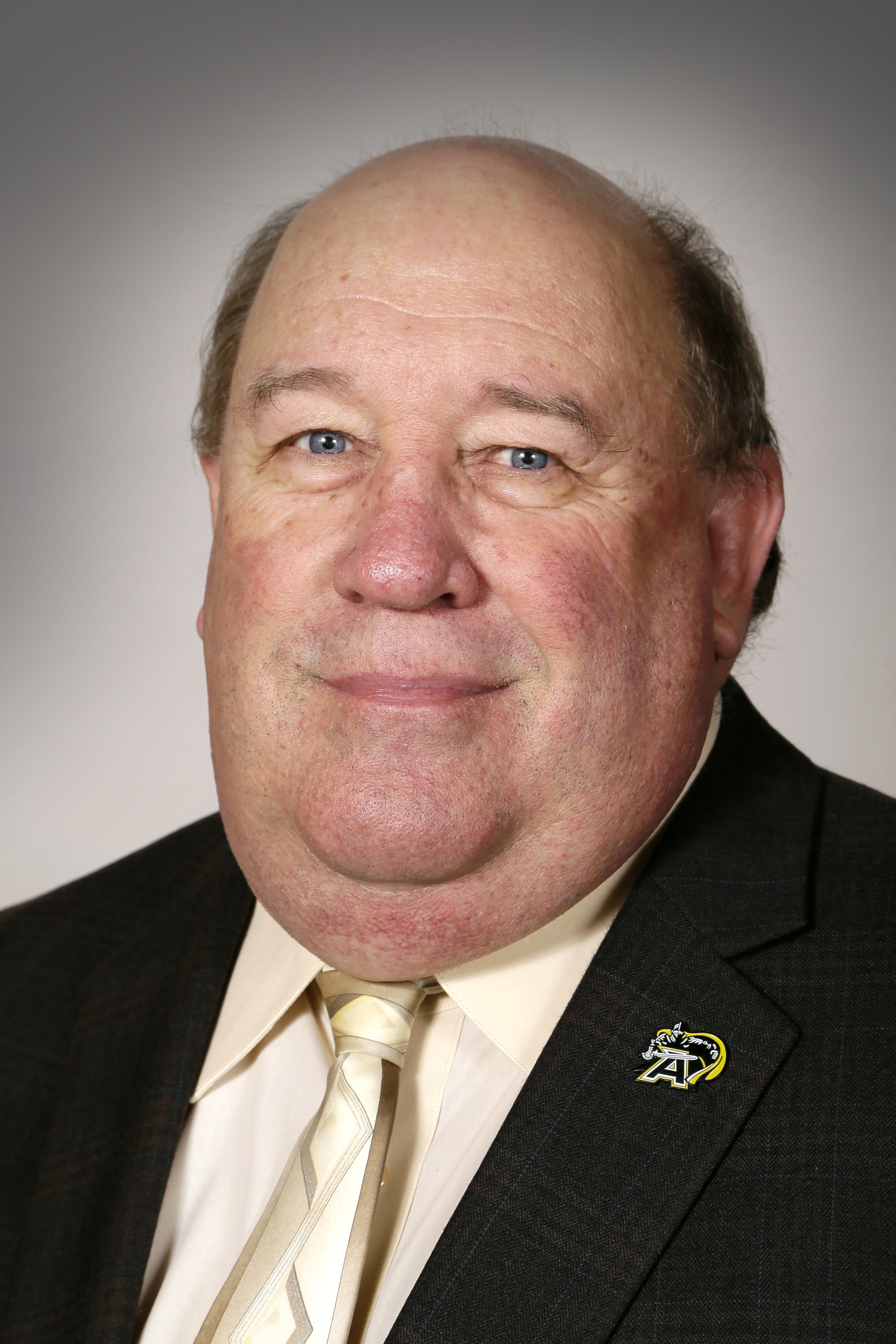
- 86th General Assembly portrait (2015)

Member of the Iowa House of Representatives from the 11th district 52nd (2007–2013)
- In office January 3, 2007 – January 9, 2023
- Preceded by: Mary Lou Freeman
- Succeeded by: Brian Best (redistricting)

Personal details
- Born: January 11, 1954 (age 72) Storm Lake, Iowa, U.S.
- Party: Republican
- Education: Iowa State University
- Profession: Farmer
- Website: legis.iowa.gov/...

Gary Worthan (born January 11, 1954) is a former Iowa State Representative from the 11th District. He served in the Iowa House of Representatives from 2007 to 2023, having won a December 13, 2006 special election to replace the deceased Mary Lou Freeman, who had run unopposed in the general election. Smith was born and lives in Storm Lake, Iowa. He has an A.A. in farm operations from Iowa State University.

As of January 2013, Worthan serves on several committees in the Iowa House – the Appropriations committee, the Judiciary committee, the Public Safety committee, and the Veterans Affairs committee. He also serves as chair of the Justice System Appropriations Subcommittee.

In 2018, he was instrumental in killing a pilot program that aimed to limit the number of people awaiting trial in jail because they cannot afford bail. Worthan was chairman of the subcommittee that oversaw the judicial budget; the editorial board of the Des Moines Register, which called the pilot program a "worthwhile experiment in criminal justice reform" criticized Worthan for scrapping the program only weeks before the end of a legislative session ("a time-honored method for legislators and lobbyists to try to slip provisions into law with little notice or public scrutiny"), and the lawmakers for protecting "special interests". On August 30, 2019, CNN reported that Josh Lederman, a co owner of Lederman Bail Bonds, had made significant donations to Worthan's Campaign, alongside donations to other Iowa Republicans.

In April 2019, Worthan proposed legislation that would curtail the powers of the Iowa Attorney General to limit the office's ability to take part in lawsuits. Tom Miller, the Democratic Attorney General, had joined lawsuits against Trump administration policies, such as the family separation policy.

== Electoral history ==
Election	Political result	Candidate	Party	Votes	%
Iowa House of Representatives special election, 2006; District 52	Republican hold	Gary Worthan	Republican	2,003	
Iowa House of Representatives special election, 2006; District 52	Republican hold	Kate Logan	Democratic	791	
Iowa House of Representatives primary elections, 2008; District 52	Republican	Gary Worthan*	Republican	unopposed	
Iowa House of Representatives general elections, 2008; District 52; Turnout: 11,917	Republican hold	Gary Worthan*	Republican	7,362	61.78%
Iowa House of Representatives general elections, 2008; District 52; Turnout: 11,917	Republican hold	Russell P. Camerer	Democratic	3,843	32.24%
Iowa House of Representatives primary elections, 2010; District 52	Republican	Gary Worthan*	Republican	unopposed	
Iowa House of Representatives general elections, 2010; District 52; Turnout: 8,635	Republican hold	Gary Worthan*	Republican	6,076	70.36%
Iowa House of Representatives general elections, 2010; District 52; Turnout: 8,635	Republican hold	Danuta Hutchins	Democratic	2,175	25.19%
Iowa House of Representatives primary elections, 2012; District 11	Republican	Gary Worthan*	Republican	unopposed	
Iowa House of Representatives general elections, 2012; District 11	Republican (newly redistricted)	Gary Worthan*	Republican	unopposed	

Iowa House of Representatives
Preceded by Mary Lou Freeman	52nd District; 2007–2013	Succeeded by vacant
Preceded by Henry Rayhons	11th District; 2013–2023	Succeeded by Brian Best
