= Ralph Watts =

American politician

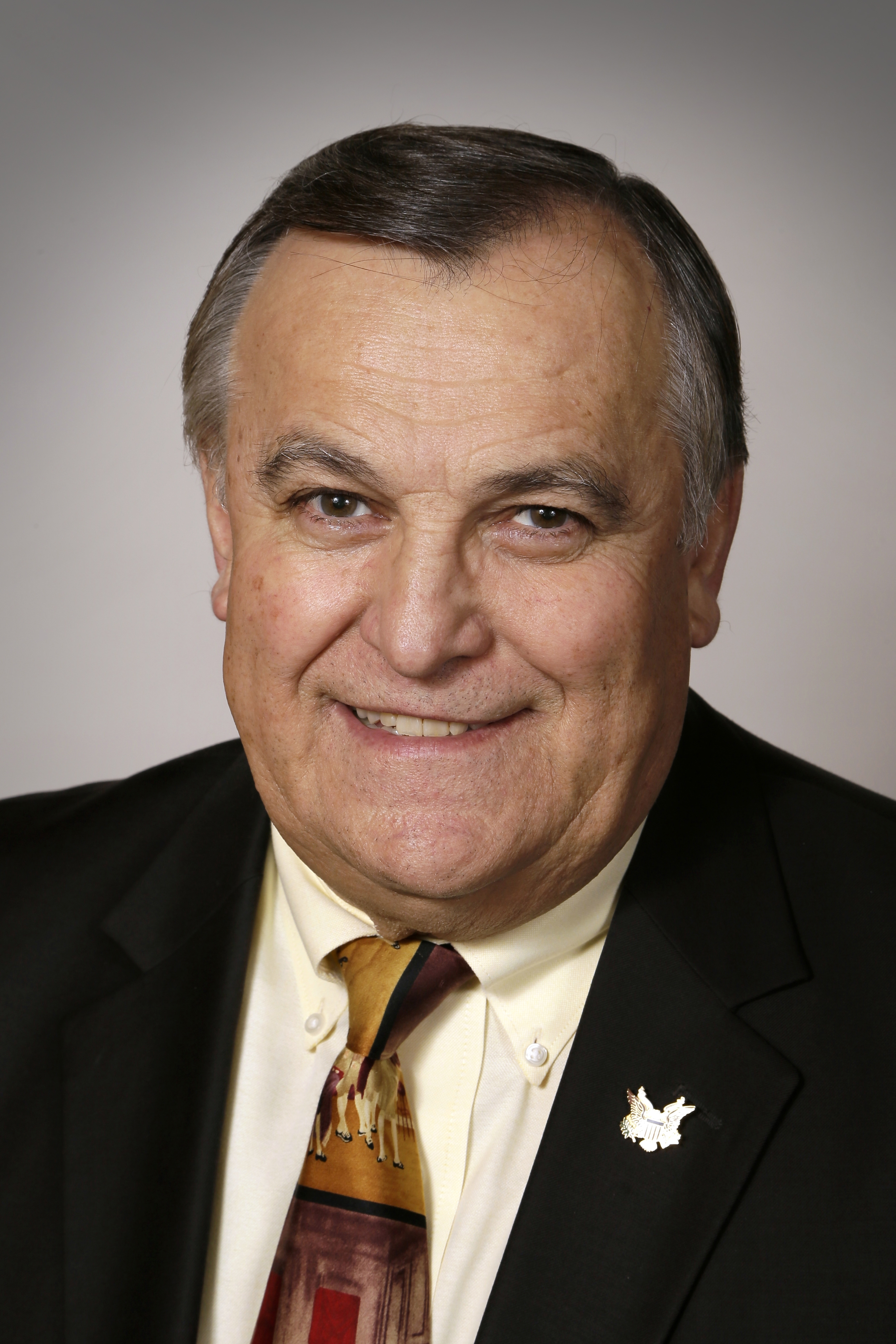

Member of the Iowa House of Representatives from the 19th district 47th (2003–2013)
- Incumbent
- Assumed office January 13, 2003
- Preceded by: Barry Brauns

Personal details
- Born: July 26, 1944 (age 81) Lovell, Wyoming, U.S.
- Party: Republican
- Education: University of Wyoming; Drake University; Creighton University
- Occupation: Retired
- Profession: Engineer
- Website: legis.iowa.gov/...

Ralph C. Watts (born July 26, 1944) is the Iowa State Representative from the 19th District. A Republican, he has served in the Iowa House of Representatives since 2003. He received his BS from the University of Wyoming and did MBA work at Drake University and at Creighton University.

As of January 2013, Watts serves on several committees in the Iowa House – the Appropriations, Commerce, Labor, and State Government committees. He also serves as the chair of the Administration and Regulation Appropriations Subcommittee.

== Electoral history ==
*incumbent

Early 47th District contests

Election	Political result	Candidate	Party	Votes	%
Iowa House of Representatives primary elections, 2002; District 47	Republican	Ralph Watts	Republican	unopposed	
Iowa House of Representatives general elections, 2002; District 47; Turnout: 12,143	Republican (newly redistricted)	Ralph Watts	Republican	6,812	56.10%
Iowa House of Representatives general elections, 2002; District 47; Turnout: 12,143	Republican (newly redistricted)	Joe Kelly	Democratic	5,326	43.86%
Iowa House of Representatives primary elections, 2004; District 47	Republican	Ralph Watts*	Republican	unopposed	
Iowa House of Representatives general elections, 2004; District 47; Turnout: 19,653	Republican hold	Ralph Watts*	Republican	11,462	58.32%
Iowa House of Representatives general elections, 2004; District 47; Turnout: 19,653	Republican hold	David E. Sande	Democratic	8,182	41.63%
Iowa House of Representatives primary elections, 2006; District 47	Republican	Ralph Watts*	Republican	unopposed	
Iowa House of Representatives general elections, 2006; District 47; Turnout: 16,093	Republican hold	Ralph Watts*	Republican	8,313	51.66%
Iowa House of Representatives general elections, 2006; District 47; Turnout: 16,093	Republican hold	Russ Wiesley	Democratic	7,242	45.00%

Election	Political result	Candidate	Party	Votes	%
Iowa House of Representatives primary elections, 2008; District 47	Republican	Ralph Watts*	Republican	unopposed	
Iowa House of Representatives general elections, 2008; District 47; Turnout: 27,625	Republican hold	Ralph Watts*	Republican	15,111	54.70%
Iowa House of Representatives general elections, 2008; District 47; Turnout: 27,625	Republican hold	Susan Temere	Democratic	10,256	37.13%
Iowa House of Representatives primary elections, 2010; District 47	Republican	Ralph Watts*	Republican	unopposed	
Iowa House of Representatives general elections, 2010; District 47; Turnout: 21,790	Republican hold	Ralph Watts*	Republican	13,663	62.70%
Iowa House of Representatives general elections, 2010; District 47; Turnout: 21,790	Republican hold	Roger Huston	Democratic	6,699	30.74%
Iowa House of Representatives primary elections, 2012; District 19	Republican	Ralph Watts*	Republican	unopposed	
Iowa House of Representatives general elections, 2012; District 19; Turnout: 18,306	Republican (newly redistricted)	Ralph Watts*	Republican	9,908	54.12%
Iowa House of Representatives general elections, 2012; District 19; Turnout: 18,306	Republican (newly redistricted)	Kenneth P. Herring	Democratic	7,009	38.29%

Iowa House of Representatives
Preceded by Barry Brauns	47th District; 2003–2013	Succeeded by Chip Baltimore
Preceded by Bob Kressig	19th District; 2013–present	Succeeded by Incumbent
