= Doug Struyk =

American politician

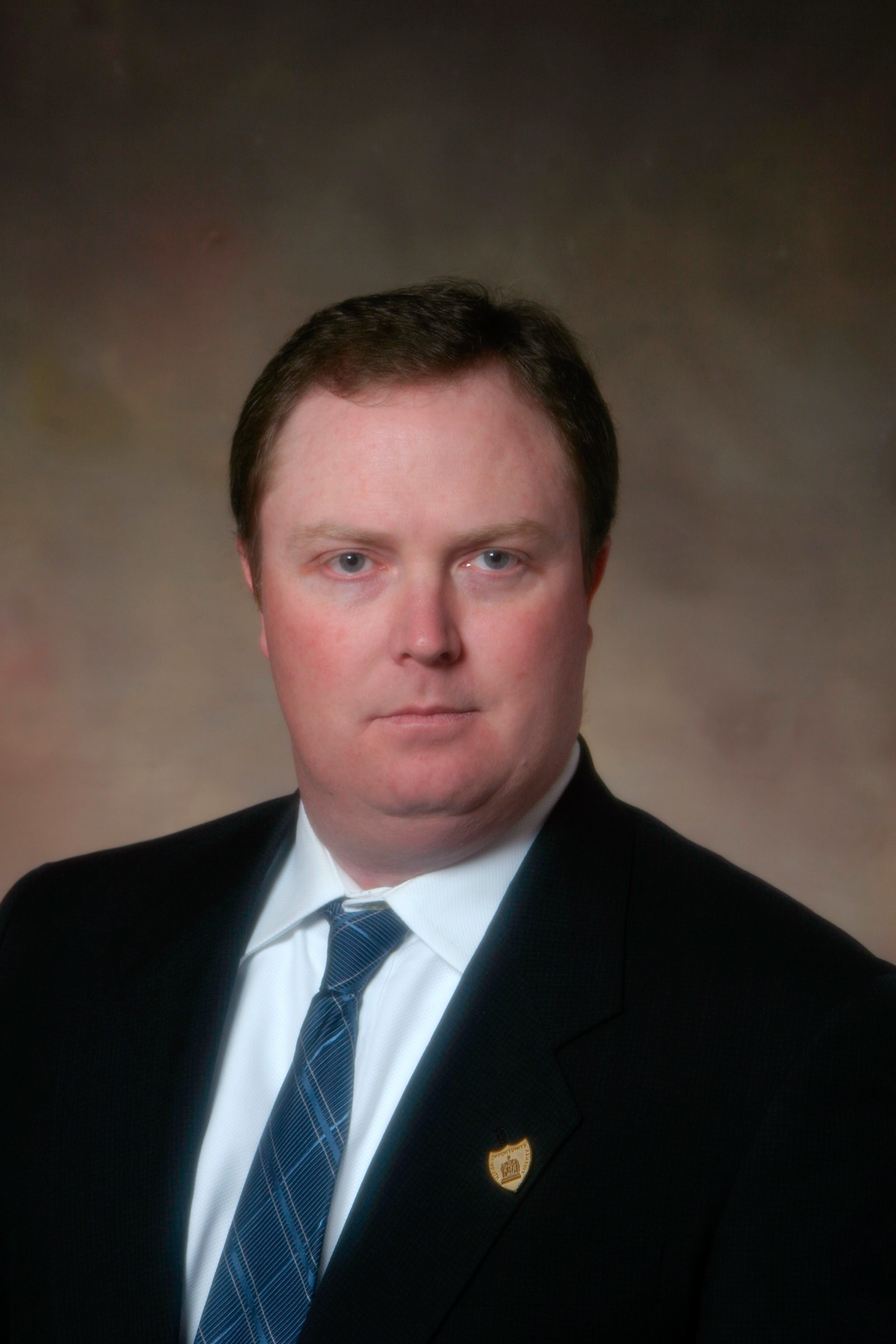

Member of the Iowa House of Representatives from the 99th district
- In office January 13, 2003 – January 9, 2011
- Preceded by: Rick Larkin
- Succeeded by: Mary Ann Hanusa

Personal details
- Born: August 1, 1970 (age 56) Omaha, Nebraska, U.S.
- Party: Republican (beginning in 2004); Democrat (until 2004)
- Education: Iowa State University; Creighton University School of Law
- Occupation: Small Business Owner/Attorney
- Website: Struyk's website

Doug L. Struyk (born August 1, 1970) is a former Iowa State Representative from the 99th District. He served in the Iowa House of Representatives from 2003 to 2011 and was an assistant minority leader. He resigned from the Iowa House in 2011 to work for the Iowa Secretary of State's office. Struyk received his B.A. from Iowa State University and his J.D. from Creighton University School of Law. He is vice president of his family's Council Bluffs, Iowa, lawn care business.

During his last term in the Iowa House, Struyk served on the Agriculture, Commerce, Judiciary, and Ways and Means committees, as well as serving as ranking member of the State Government Committee.

Struyk was first elected to the Iowa House in 2002 as a Democrat, defeating Republican opponent Stan Grote in the general election. On March 18, 2004, Struyk announced that he was switching parties to become a Republican, the announcement coming a day before the primary filing deadline. He won re-election as a Republican, defeating Democratic opponent David Phillips in the general election. He did not seek re-election to the Iowa House in 2010, instead taking a job with Iowa Secretary of State Matt Schultz as a policy advisor and legal counsel.

== Electoral history ==
*incumbent

Election	Political result	Candidate	Party	Votes	%
Iowa House of Representatives elections, 2002; District 99; Turnout: 7,060	Democratic (newly redistricted)	Doug Struyk	Democratic	3,667	51.9
Iowa House of Representatives elections, 2002; District 99; Turnout: 7,060	Democratic (newly redistricted)	Stan Grote	Republican	3,387	48.0
Iowa House of Representatives elections, 2004; District 99; Turnout: 11,263	Republican hold	Doug Struyk*	Republican	6,265	55.6
Iowa House of Representatives elections, 2004; District 99; Turnout: 11,263	Republican hold	David Phillips	Democratic	4,980	44.2
Iowa House of Representatives elections, 2006; District 99; Turnout: 6,539	Republican hold	Doug L. Struyk*	Republican	3,466	53.0
Iowa House of Representatives elections, 2006; District 99; Turnout: 6,539	Republican hold	Will Reger	Democratic	2,926	44.7
Iowa House of Representatives elections, 2008; District 99; Turnout: 11,155	Republican hold	Doug Struyk*	Republican	5,757	51.6
Iowa House of Representatives elections, 2008; District 99; Turnout: 11,155	Republican hold	Kurt Hubler	Democratic	5,387	48.3

Iowa House of Representatives
Preceded by Rick Larkin	99th District; 2003 – 2011	Succeeded by Mary Ann Hanusa
