= Dave Tjepkes =

American politician (born 1944)

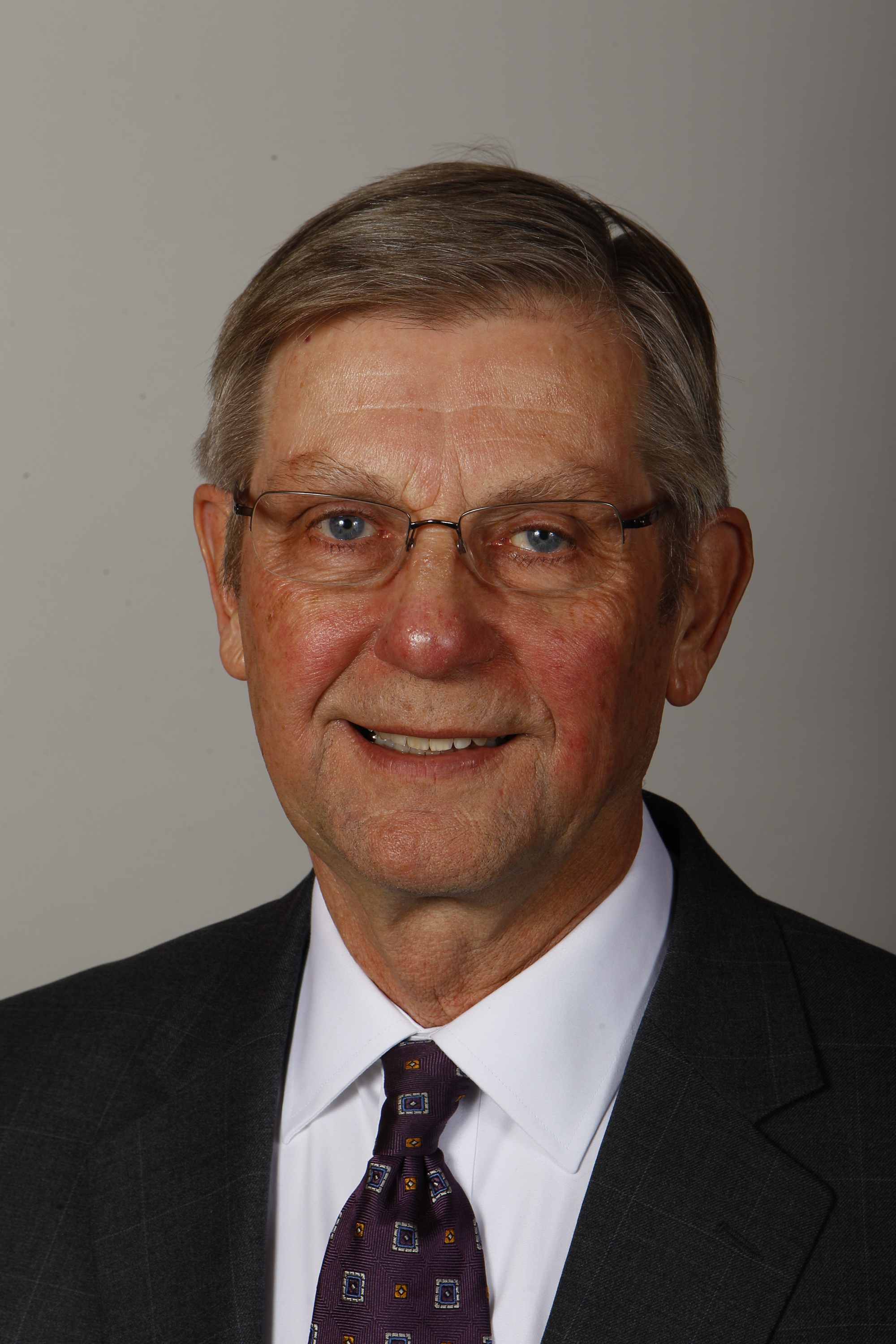

Member of the Iowa House of Representatives from the 50th district
- Incumbent
- Assumed office January 13, 2003
- Preceded by: Ro Foege

Personal details
- Born: April 22, 1944 (age 82) Sibley, Iowa
- Party: Republican
- Website: Tjepkes's website

David A. Tjepkes (born April 22, 1944) is the Iowa State Representative from the 50th District. He has served in the Iowa House of Representatives since 2003.

As of September 2011, Tjepkes serves on several committees in the Iowa House - the Government Oversight, Judiciary, Local Government, and Public Safety committees. He also serves as chair of the Transportation Committee and as a member of the Joint Government Oversight Committee and the Iowa Law Enforcement Academy Council. His prior political experience includes serving as mayor of Gowrie.

== Electoral history ==
*incumbent

Election	Political result	Candidate	Party	Votes	%
Iowa House of Representatives primary elections, 2002; District 50; Turnout: 2,439	Republican	David A. Tjepkes	Republican	1,504	61.7
Iowa House of Representatives primary elections, 2002; District 50; Turnout: 2,439	Republican	Paul E. Iverson	Republican	935	38.3
Iowa House of Representatives elections, 2002; District 50; Turnout: 10,198	Republican (newly redistricted)	David A. Tjepkes	Republican	5,373	52.7
Iowa House of Representatives elections, 2002; District 50; Turnout: 10,198	Republican (newly redistricted)	Shane S. Matthews	Democratic	4,824	47.3
Iowa House of Representatives elections, 2004; District 50	Republican hold	David A. Tjepkes*	Republican	unopposed	
Iowa House of Representatives elections, 2006; District 50; Turnout: 10,073	Republican hold	David A. Tjepkes*	Republican	5,493	54.5
Iowa House of Representatives elections, 2006; District 50; Turnout: 10,073	Republican hold	Lynne R. Gentry	Democratic	4,351	43.2
Iowa House of Representatives elections, 2008; District 50; Turnout: 12,721	Republican hold	David A. Tjepkes*	Republican	8,195	64.4
Iowa House of Representatives elections, 2008; District 50; Turnout: 12,721	Republican hold	Lynne Gentry	Democratic	4,519	35.5
Iowa House of Representatives elections, 2010; District 50	Republican hold	David Tjepkes	Republican	unopposed	

Iowa House of Representatives
Preceded by Ro Foege	50th District; 2003 – present	Succeeded by Incumbent
