= John Whitaker (Iowa politician) =

American politician

John R. Whitaker
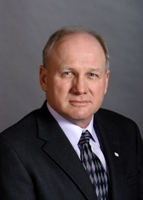

Member of the Iowa House of Representatives from the 90th district
- In office January 13, 2003 – July 17, 2009
- Preceded by: David F. Schrader
- Succeeded by: Curt Hanson

Personal details
- Born: 1956 (age 69–70) Keosauqua, Iowa, U.S.
- Party: Democratic
- Website: Whitaker's website

John R. Whitaker (born 1956) is the head of the United States Department of Agriculture's Farm Service Agency in Iowa, a former Iowa State Representative from the 90th District, and a former assistant House majority leader. He served in the Iowa House of Representatives from 2003 until his July 17, 2009 resignation from the House to accept an appointment to head the USDA's Farm Service Agency in Iowa. A special election to fill his seat took place on September 1, 2009.

During his last term in the House, Whitaker served on several committees in the Iowa House: the Administration and Rules committee; the Environmental Protection committee; the Natural Resources committee; the Public Safety committee; and the Transportation committee. His political experience includes serving as Assistant Majority Leader of the Iowa House and serving as Van Buren County Supervisor.

== Electoral history ==
*incumbent

Election	Political result	Candidate	Party	Votes	%
Iowa House of Representatives elections, 2002; District 90; Turnout: 10,475	Democratic (newly redistricted)	John Whitaker	Democratic	5,255	50.2
Iowa House of Representatives elections, 2002; District 90; Turnout: 10,475	Democratic (newly redistricted)	Connie Boyer	Republican	5,200	49.6
Iowa House of Representatives elections, 2004; District 90; Turnout: 14,264	Democratic hold	John Whitaker*	Democratic	7,649	53.6
Iowa House of Representatives elections, 2004; District 90; Turnout: 14,264	Democratic hold	Deb McCurren	Republican	6,313	44.3
Iowa House of Representatives elections, 2004; District 90; Turnout: 14,264	Democratic hold	Viktor Tichy	Libertarian	294	2.1
Iowa House of Representatives elections, 2006; District 90	Democratic hold	John Whitaker*	Democratic	unopposed	
Iowa House of Representatives elections, 2008; District 90; Turnout: 12,383	Democratic hold	John Whitaker*	Democratic	10,694	86.4
Iowa House of Representatives elections, 2008; District 90; Turnout: 12,383	Democratic hold	Dan Cesar	4th of July Party	1,626	13.1

Iowa House of Representatives
Preceded by David F. Schrader	90th District; 2003 – July 17, 2009	Succeeded by Curt Hanson
