= Tom Sands =

American politician

Tom R. Sands
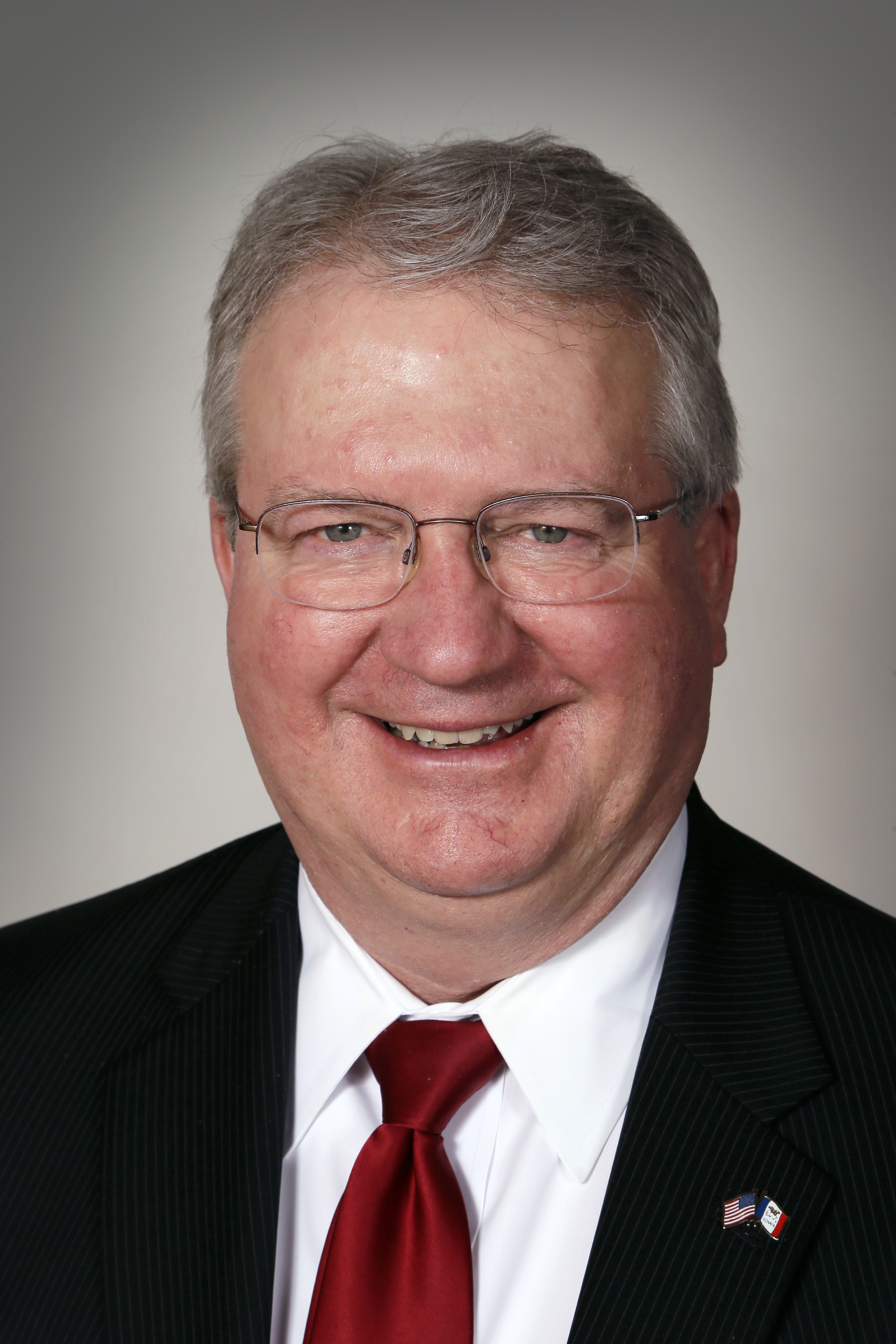

Member of the Iowa House of Representatives from the 87th district
- Incumbent
- Assumed office January 13, 2003
- Preceded by: Effie Boggess

Personal details
- Born: September 13, 1954 (age 71) Muscatine, Iowa, U.S.
- Party: Republican
- Website: Sands's website

Thomas R. Sands (born September 13, 1954) is the Iowa State Representative from the 88th District. A Republican, he has served in the Iowa House of Representatives since 2003.

As of October 2011, Sands serves on several committees in the Iowa House - the Environmental Protection and Public Safety committees. He also serves as the chair of the Ways and Means Committee. His political experience includes serving on the Columbus Junction City Council.

== Electoral history ==
*incumbent

Election	Political result	Candidate	Party	Votes	%
Iowa House of Representatives elections, 2002; District 87; Turnout: 9,411	Republican (newly redistricted)	Thomas R. Sands	Republican	5,390	57.3
Iowa House of Representatives elections, 2002; District 87; Turnout: 9,411	Republican (newly redistricted)	John Riessen	Democratic	4,017	42.7
Iowa House of Representatives elections, 2004; District 87; Turnout: 12,991	Republican hold	Thomas R. Sands*	Republican	7,842	60.4
Iowa House of Representatives elections, 2004; District 87; Turnout: 12,991	Republican hold	Sandy Dockendorlf	Democratic	5,137	39.5
Iowa House of Representatives elections, 2006; District 87; Turnout: 9,312	Republican hold	Thomas R. Sands*	Republican	5,118	55.0
Iowa House of Representatives elections, 2006; District 87; Turnout: 9,312	Republican hold	Andrew Hoth	Democratic	4,148	44.5
Iowa House of Representatives elections, 2008; District 87; Turnout: 13,076	Republican hold	Thomas R. Sands*	Republican	6,949	53.1
Iowa House of Representatives elections, 2008; District 87; Turnout: 13,076	Republican hold	Frank Best	Democratic	6,115	46.8
Iowa House of Representatives elections, 2010; District 87	Republican hold	Thomas R. Sands*	Republican	unopposed	

Iowa House of Representatives
Preceded by Effie Boggess	87th District; 2003 – present	Succeeded by Incumbent
