= Jodi Tymeson =

American politician

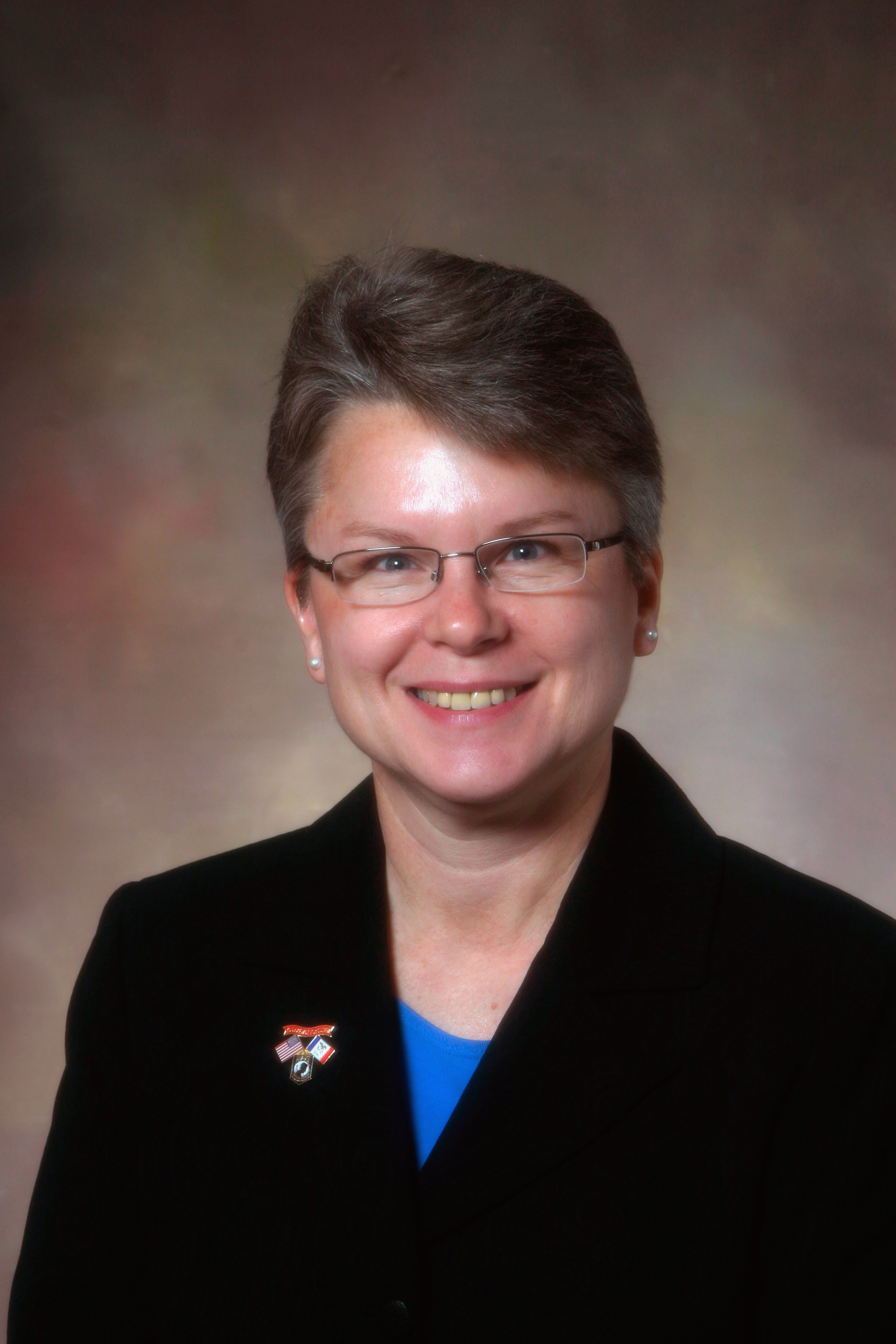

Member of the Iowa House of Representatives from the 73rd district 77th (2001 – 2003)
- In office January 8, 2001 – January 9, 2011
- Preceded by: David Lord
- Succeeded by: Julian Garrett

Personal details
- Born: June 27, 1955 (age 71) Boone, Iowa, U.S.
- Party: Republican
- Website: Tymeson's website

Jodi S. Tymeson (born June 27, 1955) is a former Iowa State Representative from the 77th and 73rd Districts. She served in the Iowa House of Representatives since 2001, representing the 77th District until it was redrawn in 2003 and representing the 73rd District until 2011. She received her BA from the University of Northern Iowa and her MPA from Drake University.

During her last term in the Iowa House, Tymeson served on several committees, the Education, Ethics, and Labor committees. She also served on the Agriculture and Natural Resources Appropriations Subcommittee. Also during her last term, she served as the ranking member of the Administration and Rules committee until November 2009 and as a member of the Veterans Affairs committee until October 2009.

== Electoral history ==
*incumbent

| Election | Political result | Candidate | Party | Votes | % |
|---|---|---|---|---|---|
| Iowa House of Representatives elections, 2000; District 77; Turnout: 18,230 | Republican hold | Jodi Tymeson | Republican | 9,871 | 54.1 |
| Iowa House of Representatives elections, 2000; District 77; Turnout: 18,230 | Republican hold | Kathryn K. Powell | Democratic | 8,345 | 45.8 |
| Iowa House of Representatives elections, 2002; District 73; Turnout: 11,572 | Republican (newly redistricted) | Jodi Tymeson* | Republican | 6,497 | 56.1 |
| Iowa House of Representatives elections, 2002; District 73; Turnout: 11,572 | Republican (newly redistricted) | Kathryn M. Russell | Democratic | 5,072 | 43.8 |
| Iowa House of Representatives elections, 2004; District 73; Turnout: 15,896 | Republican hold | Jodi Tymeson* | Republican | 10,092 | 63.5 |
| Iowa House of Representatives elections, 2004; District 73; Turnout: 15,896 | Republican hold | Rod Fee | Democratic | 5,799 | 36.5 |
| Iowa House of Representatives elections, 2006; District 73; Turnout: 12,899 | Republican hold | Jodi Tymeson* | Republican | 7,523 | 58.3 |
| Iowa House of Representatives elections, 2006; District 73; Turnout: 12,899 | Republican hold | Maxine R. Bussanmas | Democratic | 5,084 | 39.4 |
| Iowa House of Representatives elections, 2008; District 73; Turnout: 17,059 | Republican hold | Jodi Tymeson* | Republican | 10,498 | 61.5 |
| Iowa House of Representatives elections, 2008; District 73; Turnout: 17,059 | Republican hold | Maxine R. Bussanmas | Democratic | 6,548 | 38.4 |

Iowa House of Representatives
| Preceded by David Lord | 77th District; 2001 – 2003 | Succeeded by Mary Mascher |
| Preceded by Betty Grundberg | 73rd District; 2003 – 2011 | Succeeded by Julian Garrett |
