= Jamie Van Fossen =

American politician

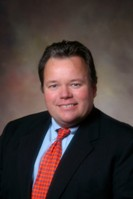

Member of the Iowa House of Representatives from the 81st district 42nd (1995 – 2003)
- In office January 9, 1995 – January 11, 2009
- Preceded by: Robert Rafferty
- Succeeded by: Phyllis Thede

Personal details
- Born: May 5, 1960 (age 66) Rock Island, Illinois, U.S.
- Party: Republican
- Spouse: Dawn
- Relations: Jim, father
- Education: Saint Ambrose University
- Website: Van Fossen's website

James Van Fossen (born May 5, 1960) is a former Iowa State Representative from the 81st and 42nd Districts. A Republican, he served in the Iowa House of Representatives from 1995 to 2009. He received his BBA from Saint Ambrose University.

During his last term in the Iowa House, Van Fossen served on the Commerce, Economic Growth, Local Government, and Ways and Means committees.

Van Fossen was first elected in 1994 in then-District 42. After the districts were redrawn for the 2002 election, he served in the 81st district. He left office in 2009, having lost his 2008 reelection bid to Democratic opponent Phyllis Thede.

== Electoral history ==
*incumbent

District 42 elections (1994 – 2000)

Election	Political result	Candidate	Party	Votes	%
Iowa House of Representatives primary elections, 1994; District 42; Turnout: 2,793	Republican	James Van Fossen	Republican	1,423	50.9
Iowa House of Representatives primary elections, 1994; District 42; Turnout: 2,793	Republican	Joyce Bawden	Republican	1,086	38.9
Iowa House of Representatives primary elections, 1994; District 42; Turnout: 2,793	Republican	Jerry Harkins	Republican	284	10.2
Iowa House of Representatives elections, 1994; District 42; Turnout: 8,218	Republican hold	James Van Fossen	Republican	4,878	59.4
Iowa House of Representatives elections, 1994; District 42; Turnout: 8,218	Republican hold	Matthew R. Wissing	Democratic	3,340	40.6
Iowa House of Representatives elections, 1996; District 42; Turnout: 10,093	Republican hold	James Van Fossen*	Republican	5,768	57.1
Iowa House of Representatives elections, 1996; District 42; Turnout: 10,093	Republican hold	Lauren M. Phelps	Democratic	4,325	42.9
Iowa House of Representatives elections, 1998; District 42; Turnout: 7,808	Republican hold	James Van Fossen*	Republican	4,339	55.6
Iowa House of Representatives elections, 1998; District 42; Turnout: 7,808	Republican hold	Jim Hayek	Democratic	3,449	44.2
Iowa House of Representatives elections, 2000; District 42; Turnout: 11,177	Republican hold	James Van Fossen*	Republican	6,014	53.8
Iowa House of Representatives elections, 2000; District 42; Turnout: 11,177	Republican hold	John E. White	Democratic	4,828	43.2
Iowa House of Representatives elections, 2000; District 42; Turnout: 11,177	Republican hold	Rich Moroney	Libertarian	329	2.9

Election	Political result	Candidate	Party	Votes	%
Iowa House of Representatives elections, 2002; District 81; Turnout: 9,711	Republican (newly redistricted)	James Van Fossen*	Republican	5,619	57.9
Iowa House of Representatives elections, 2002; District 81; Turnout: 9,711	Republican (newly redistricted)	Wayne Hean	Democratic	4,073	41.9
Iowa House of Representatives elections, 2004; District 81; Turnout: 14,766	Republican hold	Jamie Van Fossen*	Republican	8,134	55.1
Iowa House of Representatives elections, 2004; District 81; Turnout: 14,766	Republican hold	Alan E. Guard	Democratic	6,611	44.8
Iowa House of Representatives elections, 2006; District 81; Turnout: 10,760	Republican hold	Jamie Van Fossen*	Republican	5,501	51.1
Iowa House of Representatives elections, 2006; District 81; Turnout: 10,760	Republican hold	Lauren H. Phelps	Democratic	4,934	45.9
Iowa House of Representatives elections, 2008; District 81; Turnout: 15,711	Democratic gain from Republican	Phyllis Thede	Democratic	8,736	55.6
Iowa House of Representatives elections, 2008; District 81; Turnout: 15,711	Democratic gain from Republican	Jamie Van Fossen*	Republican	6,951	44.2

Iowa House of Representatives
Preceded by Robert Rafferty	42nd District; 1995 – 2003	Succeeded by Geri Huser
Preceded by Brent Siegrist	81st District; 2003 – 2009	Succeeded by Phyllis Thede
