= Linda Miller (politician) =

American politician (born 1947)

Linda J. Miller
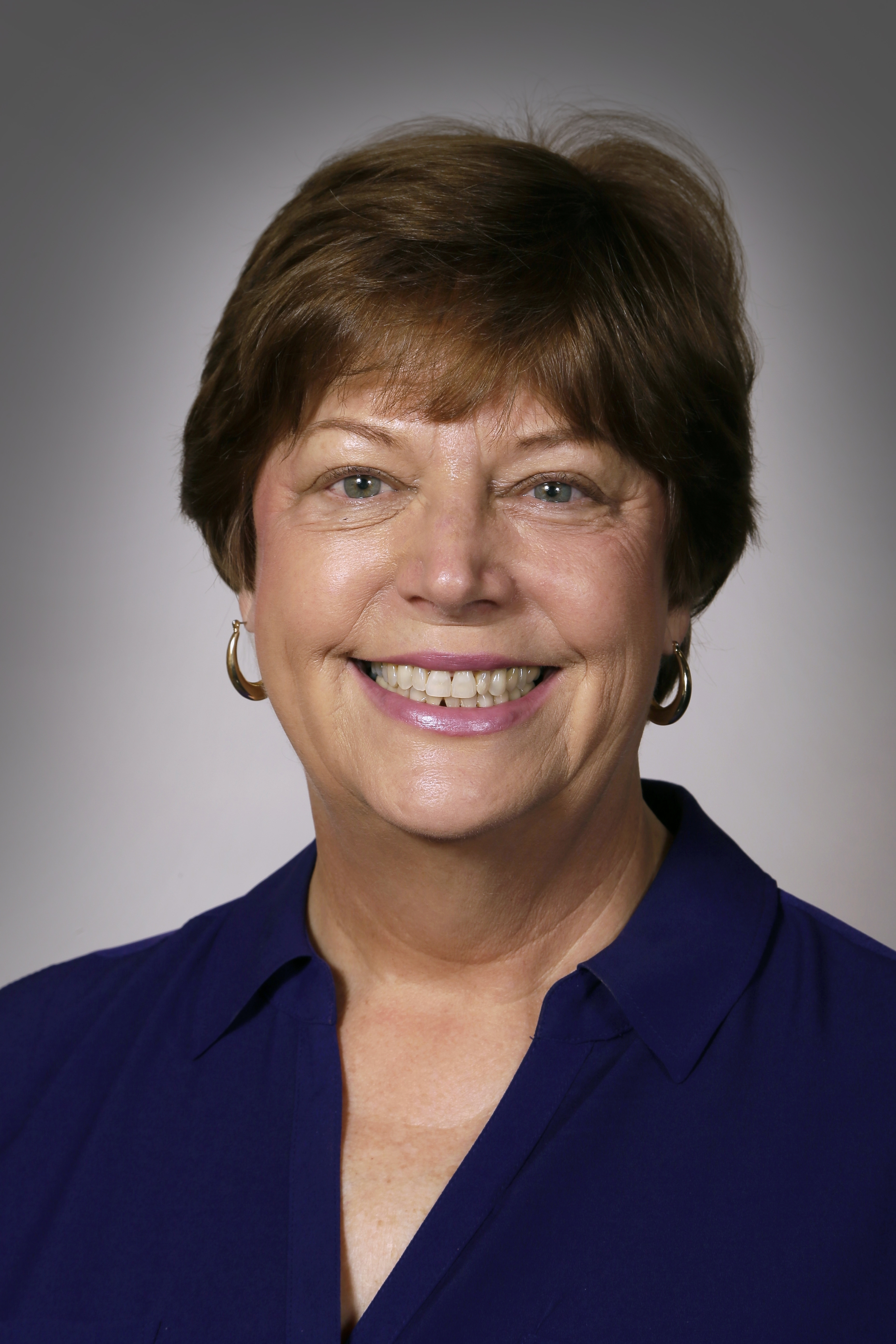

Member of the Iowa House of Representatives from the 94th district
- In office January 14, 2013 – 2017
- Preceded by: Kurt Swaim
- Succeeded by: Gary Mohr

Member of the Iowa House of Representatives from the 82nd district
- In office January 8, 2007 – January 13, 2013
- Preceded by: Joe Hutter
- Succeeded by: Dave Heaton

Personal details
- Born: August 20, 1947 (age 78) Creston, Iowa, U.S.
- Party: Republican
- Occupation: Retired Registered Nurse
- Website: Miller's website

Linda J. Miller (born August 27, 1947) is the Iowa State Representative from the 94th District. A Republican, she has served in the Iowa House of Representatives since 2007.

As of November 2011, Miller serves on several committees in the Iowa House - the Education and Labor committees. She also serves as the chair of the Human Resources committee and as a member of the Health and Human Services Appropriations Subcommittee, the Medical Assistance Projections and Assistance Council, the Governmental Public Health Advisory Council, and the Medical Assistance Advisory Council.

Miller was first elected in 2006, defeating incumbent Republican Joe Hutter in the primary. Miller won a subsequent rematch in the general election, after Hutter decided to run as an independent candidate.

== Electoral history ==
*incumbent

Election	Political result	Candidate	Party	Votes	%
Iowa House of Representatives primary elections, 2006; District 82; Turnout: 2,636	Republican	Linda J. Miller	Republican	1,672	63.4
Iowa House of Representatives primary elections, 2006; District 82; Turnout: 2,636	Republican	Joe Hutter*	Republican	962	36.5
Iowa House of Representatives elections, 2006; District 82; Turnout: 12,818	Republican hold	Linda J. Miller	Republican	6,931	54.1
Iowa House of Representatives elections, 2006; District 82; Turnout: 12,818	Republican hold	Joe Hutter*	Independent	3,307	25.8
Iowa House of Representatives elections, 2008; District 82	Republican hold	Linda J. Miller*	Republican	unopposed	
Iowa House of Representatives elections, 2010; District 82	Republican hold	Linda J. Miller*	Republican	unopposed	
Iowa House of Representatives elections, 2012; District 94; Turnout: 18,639	Republican hold	Linda J. Miller*	Republican	10,320	55.4
Iowa House of Representatives elections, 2012; District 94; Turnout: 18,639	Republican hold	Maria Bribriesco	Democratic	8,305	44.6

Iowa House of Representatives
Preceded by Joe Hutter	82nd District; 2007 – present	Succeeded by Incumbent
