= Dennis Cohoon =

American politician

Dennis M. Cohoon
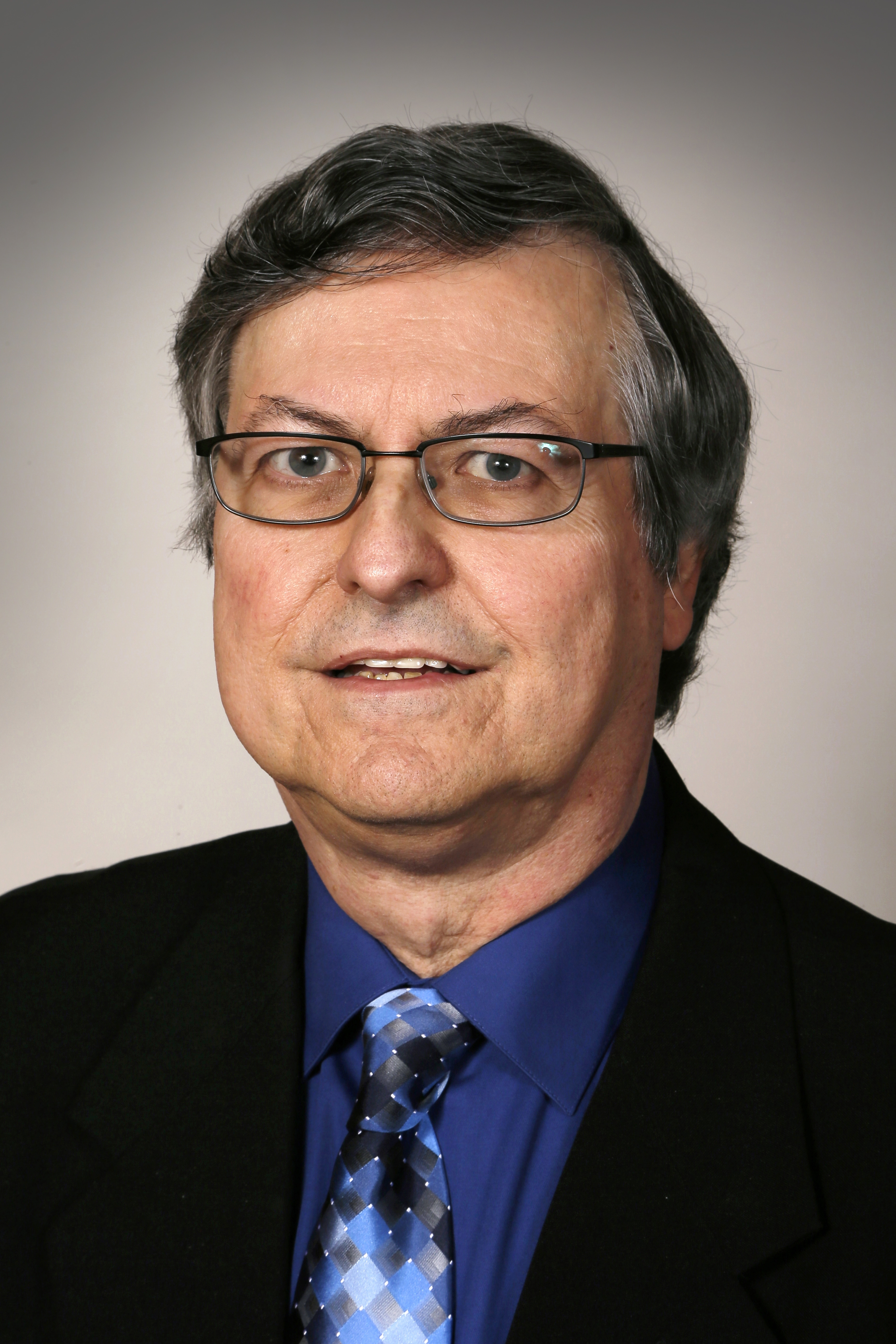
- Cohoon in 2015

Member of the Iowa House of Representatives from the 87th district
- In office January 12, 1987 – January 9, 2023
- Succeeded by: Matthew Rinker (redistricting)
- Constituency: 60th district (1987–1993); 100th district (1993–2003); 88th district (2003–2013); 87th district (2013–2023)

Personal details
- Born: March 29, 1953 (age 73) Des Moines County, Iowa, U.S.
- Party: Democratic
- Education: Iowa Wesleyan College
- Website: Cohoon's website

Dennis M. Cohoon (born March 29, 1953) is an American politician who served as an Iowa State Representative from 1987 to 2023 representing several different seats in Burlington.

== Education ==
Cohoon graduated from Burlington High School in 1971. After graduating high school, he attended Southeastern Community College where he earned an associate degree in business. He received his BA in business administration and business education with minors in special education and psychology from Iowa Wesleyan College. He has also done graduate work in special education at the University of Iowa.

== Career ==
From 1973 to 1979 Cohoon served in the Iowa Army National Guard. In 1978, he began teaching in the Burlington School District. He spent 32 years teaching special education in the Burlington School District until retiring in 2010.

Cohoon served on several committees in the Iowa House - the Appropriations committee; the Education committee; the Local Government committee; and the Transportation committee. He also served as chair of the Transportation, Infrastructure, and Capitals Appropriations Subcommittee.

Cohoon was re-elected in 2006 with 7,201 votes, running unopposed.

Cohoon endorsed North Carolina Senator John Edwards for president in 2004.

Cohoon endorsed Joe Biden for president in the 2008 and 2020 Democratic primaries. Following the suspension of Biden's campaign in January 2008, Cohoon endorsed Barack Obama for president.

== Personal life ==
Dennis Cohoon has collected Presidential memorabilia such as buttons, stamps, cards, and busts since he was seven years old. He is also a fan of University of Iowa Hawkeye basketball and the New York Yankees.

Cohoon is the son of Meril, a railroad worker and Marie Cohoon, a homemaker. He has two sisters, Judy and Sally. He has been married to his wife Sue, a math teacher, since 1998 and together they have four step children.

== Organizations ==
=== Past memberships ===
- Burlington Education Association
- Geode Education Association
- Iowa State Education Association

=== Current memberships ===
- Des Moines County Democratic Central Committee
- First Christian Church

== Electoral history ==
Election results of Dennis Cohoon
Year	Office	District	Election	Party	Votes	%	Opponent	Party	Votes	%	Opponent	Party	Votes	%	Opponent	Party	Votes	%
1986	Iowa House of Representatives	60	Primary	D	1,079	100.00%												
1986	Iowa House of Representatives	60	General	D	4,353	56.97%	Steven R. Arnold	R	3,288	43.03								
1988	Iowa House of Representatives	60	Primary	D	1,579	100.00%												
1988	Iowa House of Representatives	60	General	D	7,064	62.82%	Dianne Lerud	R	4,180	37.18%								
1990	Iowa House of Representatives	60	Primary	D	1,439	100.00%												
1990	Iowa House of Representatives	60	General	D	5,630	62.86%	Dianne K. Lerud	R	3,325	37.13%	Write-ins	W-I	1	0.01%				
1992	Iowa House of Representatives	100	Primary	D	874	100.00%												
1992	Iowa House of Representatives	100	General	D	7,615	64.43%	Sharon Marlow-Bennett	R	4,204	35.57%								
1994	Iowa House of Representatives	100	General	D	1,125	100.00%												
1994	Iowa House of Representatives	100	General	D	5,299	100.00%												
1996	Iowa House of Representatives	100	Primary	D	1,888	100.00%												
1996	Iowa House of Representatives	100	General	D	7,226	99.99%	Write-ins	W-I	1	0.01%								
1998	Iowa House of Representatives	100	Primary	D	1,483	100.00%												
1998	Iowa House of Representatives	100	General	D	5,807	100.00%												
2000	Iowa House of Representatives	100	Primary	D	2,536	99.80%	Write-ins	W-I	5	0.20%								
2000	Iowa House of Representatives	100	General	D	7,673	64.90%	Matthew Murray	R	4,145	35.06%	Write-ins	W-I	5	0.04%				
2002	Iowa House of Representatives	88	Primary	D	1,050	99.81%	Write-ins	W-I	2	0.19%								
2002	Iowa House of Representatives	88	General	D	7,540	98.92%	Write-ins	W-I	82	1.08%								
2004	Iowa House of Representatives	88	Primary	D	1,470	99.53%	Write-ins	W-I	7	0.47%								
2004	Iowa House of Representatives	88	General	D	10,541	99.15%	Write-ins	W-I	90	0.85%								
2006	Iowa House of Representatives	88	Primary	D	1,681	99.23%	Write-ins	W-I	13	0.77%								
2006	Iowa House of Representatives	88	General	D	7,201	99.31%	Write-ins	W-I	50	0.69%								
2008	Iowa House of Representatives	88	Primary	D	1,558	99.62%	Write-ins	W-I	6	0.38%								
2008	Iowa House of Representatives	88	General	D	10,248	73.65%	Write-ins	W-I	173	1.31%								
2010	Iowa House of Representatives	88	Primary	D	512	81.92%	Write-ins	W-I	2	0.32%								
2010	Iowa House of Representatives	88	General	D	5,702	56.75%	Dave Selmon	R	4,022	40.03%	Write-ins	W-I	7	0.07%				
2012	Iowa House of Representatives	87	Primary	D	867	83.29%	Write-ins	W-I	6	0.58%								
2012	Iowa House of Representatives	87	General	D	6,898	45.69%	Dan Cahill	Independent	5,234	34.67%	Andrew Wilson	R	2,489	16.49%	Write-ins	W-I	6	0.40%
2014	Iowa House of Representatives	87	Primary	D	557	80.96%	Write-ins	W-I	2	0.29%								
2014	Iowa House of Representatives	87	General	D	6,786	68.94%	Write-ins	W-I	157	1.60%								
2016	Iowa House of Representatives	87	Primary	D	603	86.89%	Write-ins	W-I	6	0.86%								
2016	Iowa House of Representatives	87	General	D	9,333	67.84%	Write-ins	W-I	196	1.42%								
2018	Iowa House of Representatives	87	Primary	D	1,344	84.79%	Write-ins	W-I	8	0.50%								
2018	Iowa House of Representatives	87	General	D	6,010	55.87%	Tim Goodwin	R	4,596	42.73%	Write-ins	W-I	7	0.07%				
2020	Iowa House of Representatives	87	Primary	D	2,869	93.79%	Write-ins	W-I	13	0.42%								
2020	Iowa House of Representatives	87	General	D	9,992	70.62%	Write-ins	W-I	331	2.34%								
2022	Iowa House of Representatives	99	Primary	D	1,165	93.35%	Write-ins	W-I	5	0.40%								
2022	Iowa House of Representatives	99	General	D	5,007	46.99%	Matt Rinker	R	5,468	51.31%	Write-ins	W-I	26	0.24%				

Iowa House of Representatives
Preceded by Elaine Baxter	60th District; 1987 – 1993	Succeeded by William J. Brand
Preceded by Emil Pavich	100th District; 1993 – 2003	Succeeded by Brad Hansen
Preceded by Cecil Dolecheck	88th District; 2003 – 2013	Succeeded by Tom Sands
Preceded by Tom Sands	87th District; 2013 – 2023	Succeeded by Matthew Rinker
