= Rebecca Reynolds (politician) =

American politician (born 1949)

Member of the Iowa House of Representatives
- In office January 13, 1997 – January 12, 2003

Personal details
- Born: May 31, 1949 (age 77) Evanston, Illinois, U.S.
- Party: Democratic
- Spouse: Tom
- Children: 5
- Occupation: Nurse

Rebecca Reynolds-Knight (born May 31, 1949) is an American politician in the state of Iowa.

Reynolds was born in Evanston, Illinois and attended Valley College in California. A Democrat, she served in the Iowa House of Representatives from 1997 to 2002 (94th district).
