= Rich Anderson (Iowa politician) =

American politician (born 1956)

Richard Anderson
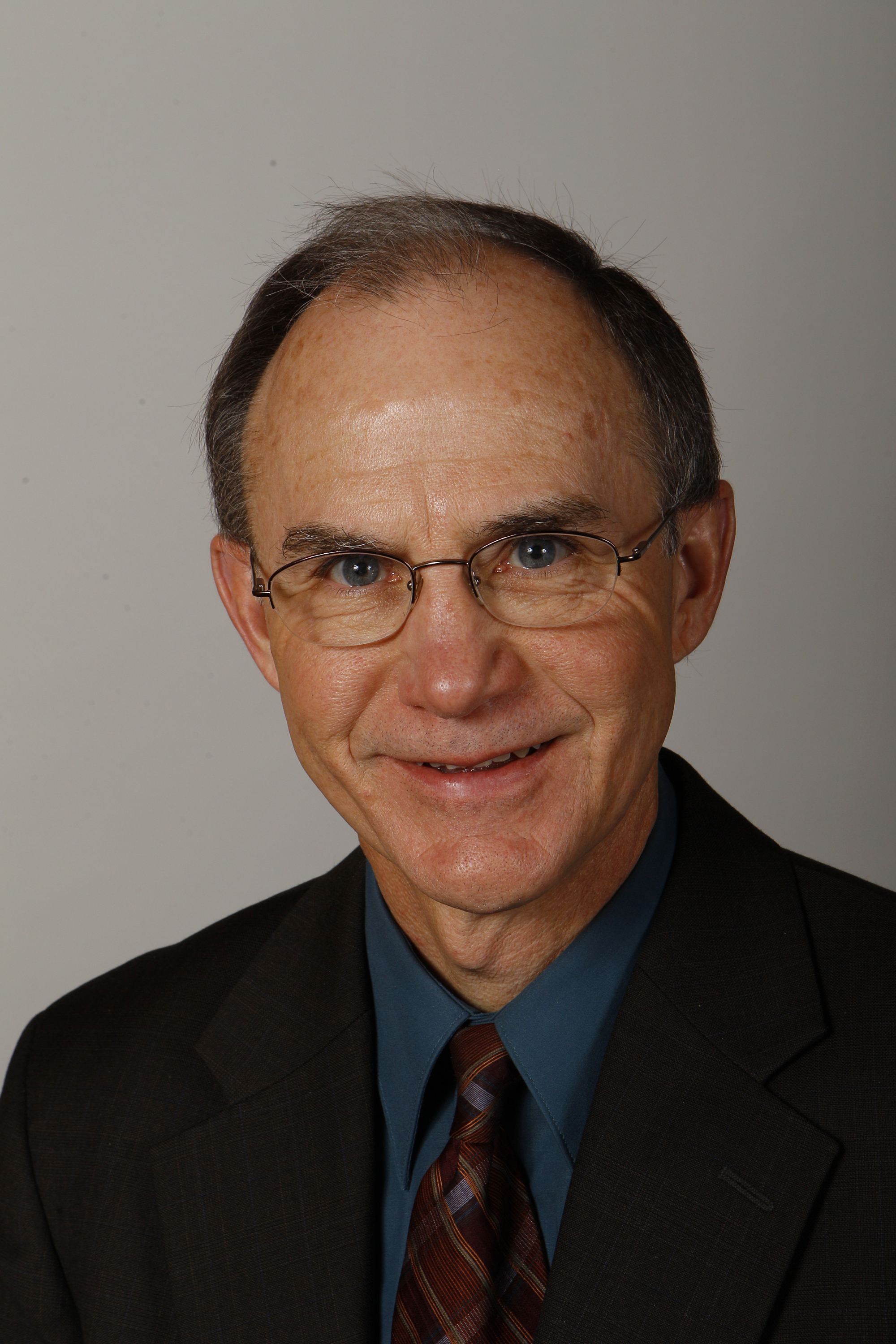

Member of the Iowa House of Representatives from the 97th district
- Incumbent
- Assumed office January 10, 2005
- Preceded by: Effie Boggess

Personal details
- Born: July 19, 1956 (age 70)
- Party: Republican
- Website: Anderson's website

Richard "Rich" Anderson (born July 19, 1956) is the Iowa State Representative from the 97th District. He has served in the Iowa House of Representatives since 2005.

== Early life and education ==
Anderson was raised in Clarinda, Iowa and graduated from Clarinda High School in 1974. He then attended Iowa Western Community College and obtained his B.A. in 1978 from the University of Iowa. In 1986 he received his J.D. from Drake University.

== Career ==
Anderson currently serves on several committees in the Iowa House – the Economic Growth committee; the Environmental committee; and the Judiciary committee, where he is the ranking member. He also serves on the Justice System Appropriations Subcommittee.

Anderson was re-elected in 2006 with 6,464 votes, running unopposed.

Anderson has worked as an attorney at Millhone & Anderson, P.C., since 1991. From 1988 through 1991, he worked at Dickinson Law Firm. From 1982 to 1984 Anderson was a law clerk for Iowa Supreme Court Justice J.L. Larson. He also worked as a physical therapist for Rancho Los Amigos Hospital in Downey, California from 1982 to 1984. Lastly, he has been an adjunct assistant professor at Des Moines University since 1990.

== Family ==
Anderson is married to his wife Pamela and together they have three daughters: Heidi, Meagan, and Bethany.

Iowa House of Representatives
Preceded by Effie Boggess	97th District; 2005 – present	Succeeded by Incumbent
