= McKinley Bailey =

American politician

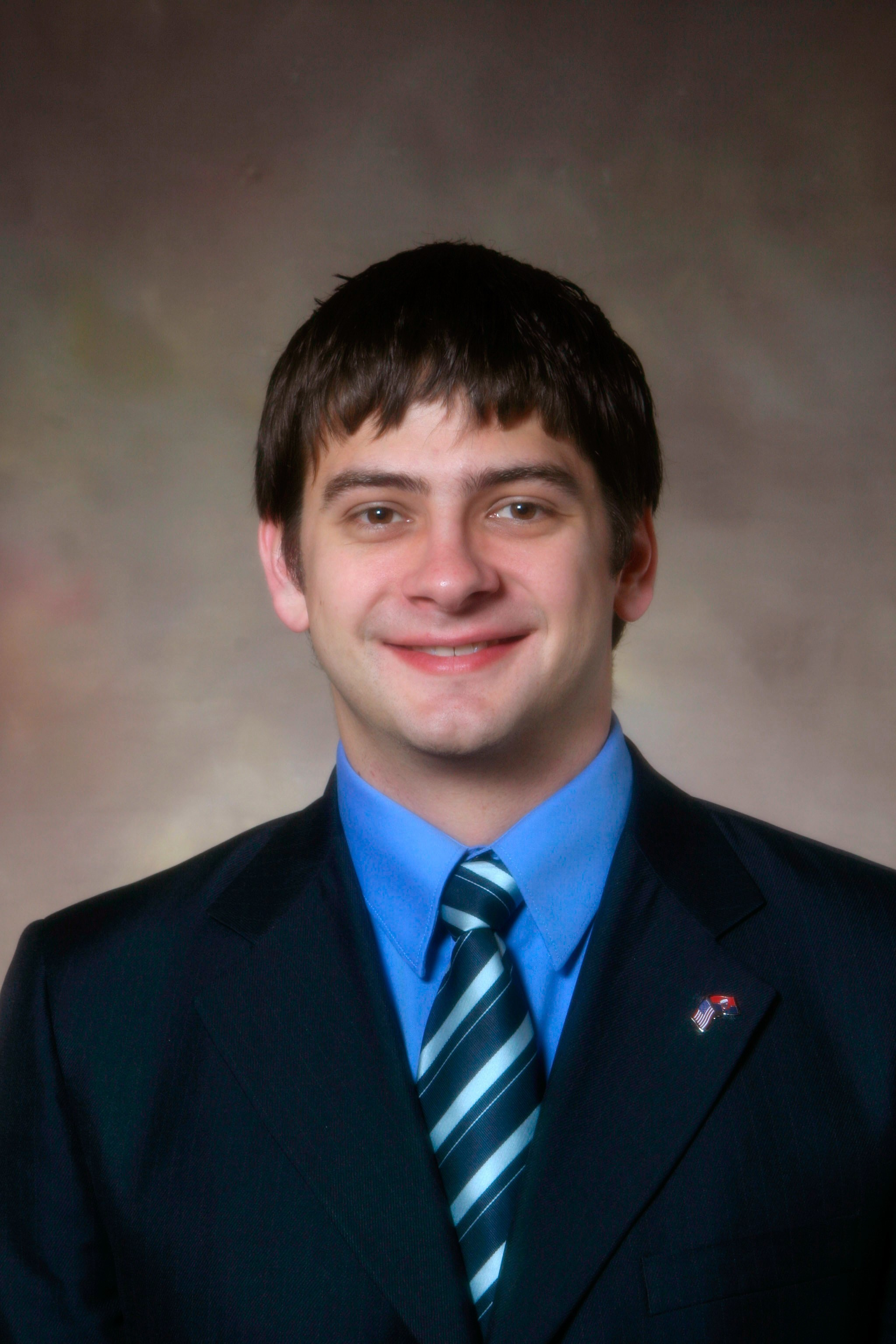

Member of the Iowa House of Representatives from the 9th district
- In office January 8, 2007 – 2010
- Preceded by: George Eichhorn

Personal details
- Born: November 12, 1980 (age 45) Ames, Iowa, United States
- Party: Democratic
- Education: University of Iowa
- Occupation: State representative
- Website: Bailey's website

McKinley Bailey (born November 12, 1980) is the Iowa State Representative from the 9th District. He has served in the Iowa House of Representatives since 2007.

Bailey currently serves on several committees in the Iowa House - the Commerce committee; the Economic Growth committee; the Natural Resources committee; the Veterans Affairs committee. He also serves as vice-chair of the Agriculture and Natural Resources Appropriations Subcommittee.

Bailey was elected in 2006 with 5,685 votes (55%), defeating Republican opponent George S. Eichhorn.

== Early life and education ==
Bailey was raised in Webster City, Iowa. He obtained his A.A with an emphasis in Spanish from Methodist College in Fayetteville, North Carolina. He later received his B.A in international studies with a concentration in international business from the University of Iowa. He began studying for his master's degree in Public Administration in 2007 at Iowa State University.

== Career ==
Prior to becoming a state representative, Bailey served in the US Army in Afghanistan and Iraq.

== Organizations ==
Bailey is a member of the following organizations:

- Hamilton County League of Women Voters
- VFW
- American Legion
- Disabled American Veterans
- University of Iowa Veterans Association (Founder and past president)

Iowa House of Representatives
Preceded by George Eichhorn	9th District; 2007 – present	Succeeded by Incumbent
