= Effie Boggess =

American politician in Iowa (1927–2021)

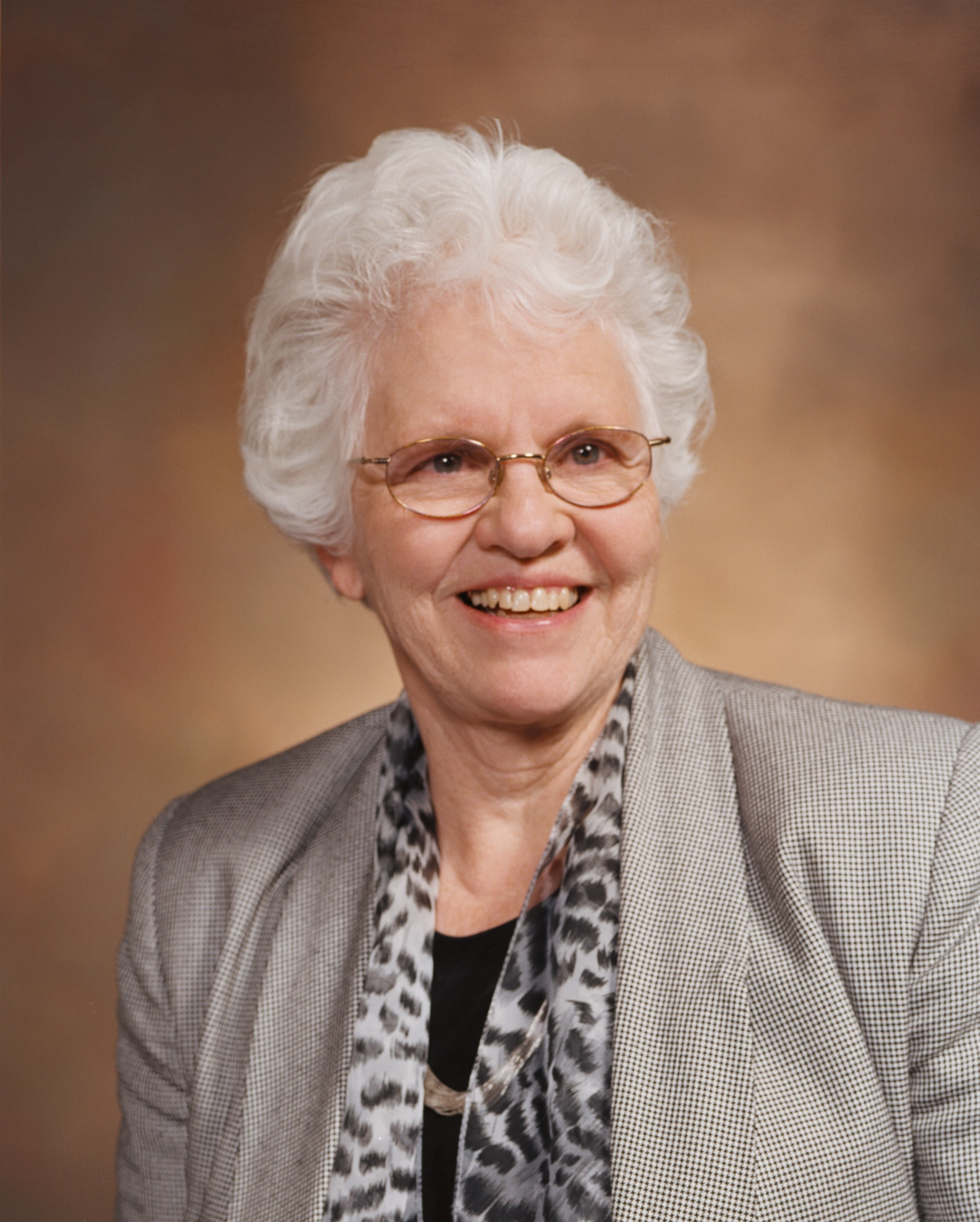

Member of the Iowa House of Representatives
- In office January 9, 1995 – January 9, 2005

Personal details
- Born: Effie Lee Narigon; December 27, 1927 Adams County, Iowa, US
- Died: May 18, 2021 (aged 93) Villisca, Iowa, US
- Party: Republican
- Spouse: Frank H. Boggess
- Occupation: Farmer

Effie Lee Boggess (née Narigon; December 27, 1927 – May 18, 2021) was an American politician in the state of Iowa.

Boggess was born in Adams County, Iowa. She attended Simpson College and was a farmer. A Republican, she served in the Iowa House of Representatives from 1995 to 2005 (87th district from 1995 to 2003 and 97th district from 2003 to 2005).
