= Brad Hansen =

American politician

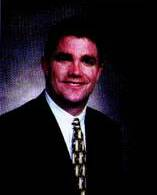

Member of the Iowa House of Representatives
- In office January 11, 1993 – August 4, 2003

Personal details
- Born: October 30, 1968 (age 57) Onawa, Iowa, U.S.
- Party: Republican
- Spouse: Suzanne

Brad L. Hansen (born October 30, 1968) is an American politician in the state of Iowa.

Hansen was born in Onawa, Iowa. He attended University of Iowa and is a businessman. A Republican, he served in the Iowa House of Representatives from 1997 to 2003 (83rd district and briefly the 100th district in 2003).
