= Lance Horbach =

American politician (born 1958)

Lance J. Horbach
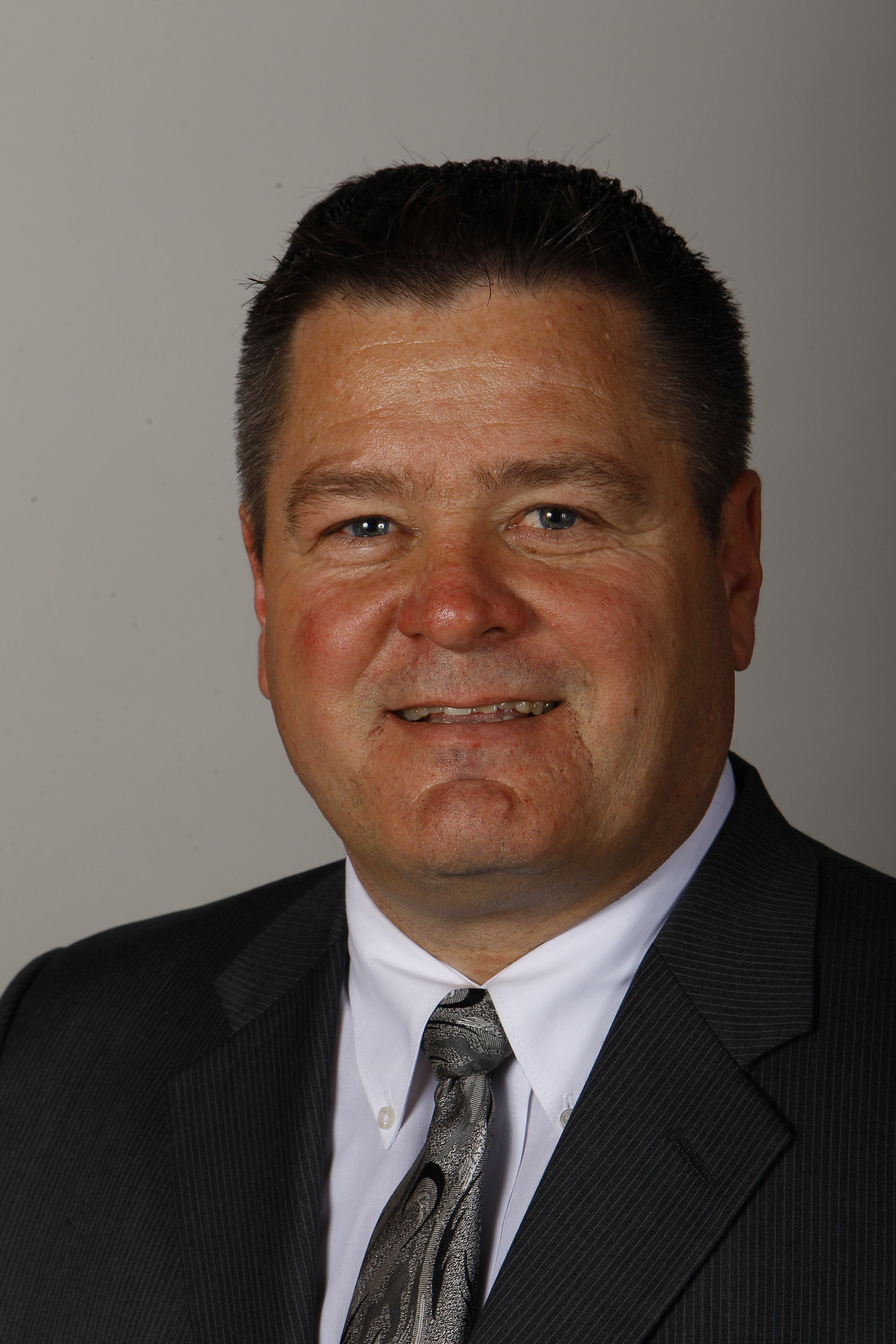

Member of the Iowa House of Representatives from the 40th district
- Incumbent
- Assumed office 1998
- Preceded by: Bryan Sievers

Personal details
- Born: February 14, 1958 (age 68) Grundy Center, Iowa
- Party: Republican
- Spouse: Jody
- Children: 4 children
- Website: Horbach's website

Lance J. Horbach (born February 14, 1958, in Grundy Center, Iowa) is the Iowa State Representative from the 40th District. He has served in the Iowa House of Representatives since 1998.

Horbach currently serves on several committees in the Iowa House - the Economic Growth committee; the Judiciary committee; and the Labor committee, where he is the ranking member. He also serves on the Justice System Appropriations Subcommittee. His prior political experience includes serving as a Tama County Zoning Commissioner from 1996 to 1998.

A Republican, Horbach was re-elected in 2006 with 6,249 votes (55%), defeating Democratic opponent Sharon Owens.

== Early life and education ==
Horbach was raised in Tama-Toeldo. He graduated from South Tama High School and received his BS from Iowa State University.

== Career ==
Outside politics Horbach works for the Independent Insurance Services in Marshalltown, Iowa. He began working here in 2000 and is in charge of managing the IIS Nursing Home Program.

== Organizations ==
He is a member of the following organizations:

- Eagles Club
- Lions Club
- Farm Bureau

== Family ==
Horbach is married to his wife Jody and together they have four children: Amy, Kendra, Melissa and Nick. They also have eight grandchildren.

Iowa House of Representatives
Preceded by Bill Brand	60th District; 1998 – 2002	Succeeded by Libby Jacobs
Preceded by Bryan Sievers	40th District; 2002 – present	Succeeded by Incumbent
