= South Omaha Public Library =

Public library in South Omaha, Nebraska

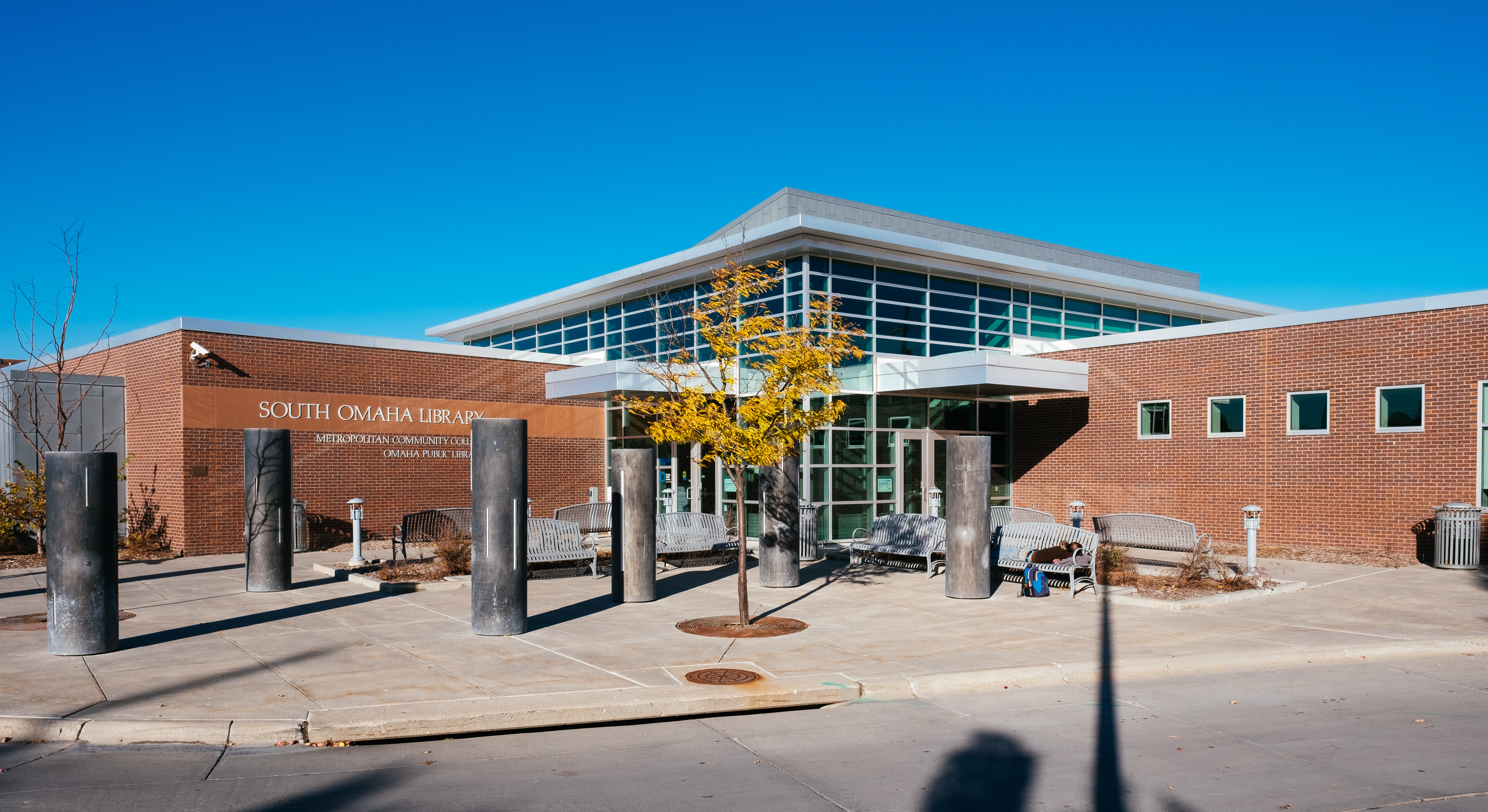
- South Omaha Public Library in 2018
- 41.20601250742746°N 95.955833811392°W
- Location: 2808 Q St., South Omaha, Nebraska, U.S.
- Type: Public library
- Established: 1889
- Branch of: Omaha Public Library

Other information
- Website: omahalibrary.org/locations/os/

The South Omaha Public Library is the South Omaha branch of the Omaha Public Library system. The original library was established in 1889 as a subscription library. It then moved to a Carnegie library located at 2302 M Street that opened in 1905. The most recent building, completed in 2008, features the city of Omaha's largest Spanish language collection and a large collection hosted in partnership between the City of Omaha, the Omaha Public Library and the Omaha's Metropolitan Community College.

== History ==
The South Omaha Public Library began as a subscription library, founded in 1889 by A. M. Winebrener. The library was originally located in an old drug store at N and 25th Streets. By 1895, the library was financially struggling and needed to move to a new building.

After getting a $50,000 grant from the Andrew Carnegie Library Fund, the library chose a site at 2302 M Street, and the library began construction in 1902. The library officially moved into the building in 1905. The building was designed by Thomas Rogers Kimball, and used a Renaissance Revival style, reminiscent of a small Italian palazzo. When the City of Omaha annexed South Omaha in 1915, the South Omaha Public Library became the first branch of the Omaha Public Library system.

In 1953, it was announced that a new library would be built on the site of the previous one. The Carnegie library was demolished later that year, and the library moved to a temporary location. The library was designed by Leo A. Daly. The new library officially opened in October 1954.

By the late 1990s, the library's building was outdated, too small, was short on parking, and needed to be rebuilt. In 1999, a new location was announced, which would be adjacent to Metropolitan Community College's South Omaha campus. The decision to build it there was criticized, as many people viewed the part of Omaha as unsafe, with many refusing to use it.

The library's initially endured several delays and rising construction costs. Ground was broken for the current library in October 2006, with construction commencing shortly after. The old library closed on May 17, 2008 and the current library opened later that same month.

== See also ==
- Original Omaha Public Library Building
- Omaha Public Library System Overview
- Omaha Public Library Branches
