= Iowa's 10th House of Representatives district =

American legislative district

House District 10
- Type: District of the Lower house
- Location: Iowa
- Representative: John Wills
- Parent organization: Iowa General Assembly

The 10th District of the Iowa House of Representatives in the state of Iowa. It is currently composed of Dickinson and Palo Alto Counties, as well as part of Clay and Kossuth Counties.

== Current elected officials ==
John Wills is the representative currently representing the district.

== Past representatives ==
The district has previously been represented by:

- Chuck Grassley, 1971–1973
- Richard W. Welden, 1973–1983
- Richard L. Groth, 1983–1987
- Russell Eddie, 1987–2003
- Jim Kurtenbach, 2003–2007
- Dave Deyoe, 2007–2013
- Tom W. Shaw, 2013–2015
- Mike Sexton, 2015–2023
