= Chuck Gipp =

American politician (born 1947)

Charles R. Gipp
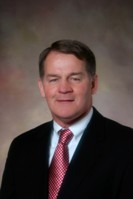

Member of the Iowa House of Representatives from the 16th district
- In office 1990–2009
- Preceded by: Henry Rayhons
- Succeeded by: John W. Beard (D)

Personal details
- Born: November 30, 1947 (age 78) Decorah, Iowa
- Party: Republican
- Spouse: Ranae
- Children: Alison and Barrett
- Website: Gipp's official website when he was a member

Charles R. "Chuck" Gipp (born November 30, 1947) is an American politician in the state of Iowa. A Republican, he served in the Iowa House of Representatives for the 31st district from 1990 to 2003 and for the 16th district from 2003 to 2009. He was the majority leader in the Iowa House from 2003 to 2007, when the Democrats recaptured the legislature in the 2006 elections.

== Early life ==
Gipp was born on November 30, 1947, in Decorah, Iowa. His parents were Alvin and Jeanette Gipp. He graduated from Thomas Roberts High School in 1966 and received his bachelor's of arts degree from Luther College in 1977. The next year, he married J. Ranae Keoppel. The couple had two children: Alison and Barrett.

== Political career ==
Gipp served as the chair of the Winneshiek County Republicans from 1980 to 1990, chair of the Winneshiek County Solid Waste Commission from 1981 to 1990 and as a member of the Iowa Brown Swiss Association, the Farm Bureau and the National Federation of Independent Business. He was first elected to the Iowa House of Representatives in the 1990 general election for the 31st district. He served on several committees in the Iowa House: the state government committee and the transportation committee. He also served on the Transportation, Infrastructure, and Capitals Appropriations Subcommittee. He was the assistant majority leader of the Iowa House from 1993 to 1994 and majority whip of the Iowa House from 1995 to 1996.

Gipp was re-elected in 2006 with 5,782 votes (59%), defeating Democratic opponent Thomas Hansen. He did not contest the 2008 election and was succeeded by a Democrat, John W. Beard.

Gipp was the director of the Iowa Department of Natural Resources (DNR) from 2012-2018. He had been the deputy director since August 5, 2011. Before that he was the administrator of the Soil Conservation Division for the Iowa Department of Agriculture and Land Stewardship. He became the Director of the Iowa DNR after his predecessor, Roger Lande, resigned on May 25, 2012.

Iowa House of Representatives
Preceded by Paul Johnson	31st District; 1990 – 2002	Succeeded by Gene Manternach
Preceded by Henry Rayhons	16th District; 2002 – 2009	Succeeded by John W. Beard (D)
