= Richard Groth =

American politician (1946–2021)

Member of the Iowa House of Representatives from the 10th district
- In office January 10, 1983 – January 11, 1987
- Preceded by: Richard W. Welden
- Succeeded by: Russell Eddie

Member of the Iowa House of Representatives from the 6th district
- In office January 8, 1979 – January 9, 1983
- Preceded by: Keith Baker
- Succeeded by: Wilmer Rensink

Personal details
- Born: Richard Lee Groth; March 18, 1946 Storm Lake, Iowa
- Died: May 29, 2021 (aged 75) Des Moines, Iowa
- Party: Democratic
- Education: Iowa State University; University of Northern Iowa
- Occupation: teacher

Richard Lee Groth (March 18, 1946 – May 29, 2021) was an American politician.

Groth was born to parents Chris and Florence in Storm Lake, Iowa, on March 18, 1946. He was educated at Newell–Providence Elementary School and Alta Community High School, graduating in 1964. After completing his degree in American government at Iowa State University in 1968, Groth became a teacher and guidance counselor. He later earned a Master of Arts degree in guidance and counseling from the University of Northern Iowa in 1971.

Groth won his first state legislative election in 1978, and was seated to the Iowa House of Representatives for District as a Democrat. He won reelection in 1980, then won two additional consecutive terms for District 10, and left office in 1987.

Groth married Susan Wilson in 1965, with whom he had two children. At his death on May 29, 2021, he was survived by his wife Patty.
