= Iowa's 31st House of Representatives district =

American legislative district

House District 31
- Type: District of the Lower house
- Location: Iowa
- Representative: Mary Madison
- Parent organization: Iowa General Assembly

The 31st District of the Iowa House of Representatives is a district in the state of Iowa. It is currently composed of part of Polk and Dallas Counties.

== Current elected officials ==
Mary Madison is the representative currently representing the district.

== Past representatives ==
The district has previously been represented by:

- Clyde Rex, 1971–1973
- Russell L. Wyckoff, 1973–1979
- Perry K. Hummel, 1979–1983
- Semor C. Tofte, 1983–1985
- Paul W. Johnson, 1985–1991
- Chuck Gipp, 1991–2003
- Gene Manternach, 2003–2005
- Ray Zirkelbach, 2005–2011
- Lee Hein, 2011–2013
- Rick Olson, 2013–2023
- Mary Madison, 2023–present
