= Iowa's 16th House of Representatives district =

American legislative district

House District 16
- Type: District of the Lower house
- Location: Iowa
- Representative: David Sieck
- Parent organization: Iowa General Assembly

The 16th District of the Iowa House of Representatives in the state of Iowa is composed of Mills and Fremont Counties, and part of Pottawattamie County.

== Representatives ==
The district has previously been represented by:

- Thomas M. Dougherty, 1965–1967
- Thomas M. Dougherty, 1969–1971
- James E. Wirtz, 1971–1973
- Semor C. Tofte, 1973–1983
- Clifford Branstad, 1983–1997
- Henry Rayhons, 1997–2003
- Chuck Gipp, 2003–2009
- John W. Beard, 2009–2011
- Bob Hager, 2011–2013
- Mary Ann Hanusa, 2013–2021
- Brent Siegrist, 2021–2023
- David Sieck, 2023-
