= Omaha Central Library =

Public library in Omaha, Nebraska, U.S.

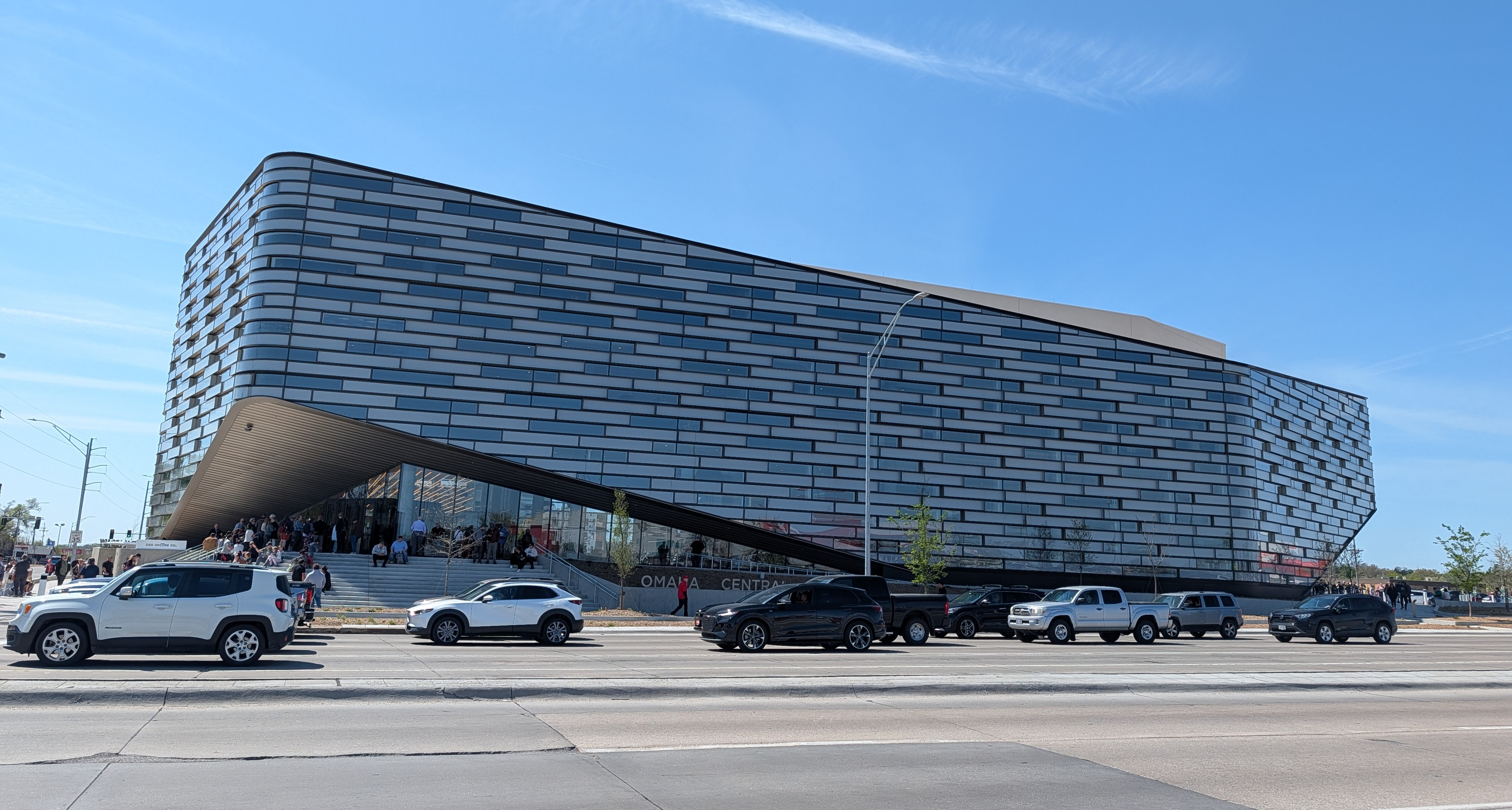
- Omaha Central Library in 2026
- 41.259193°N 96.024637°W
- Location: Omaha, Nebraska, U.S.
- Type: Public library
- Established: April 19, 2026
- Architects: Alley Poyner Macchietto Architecture, and HDR, Inc.
- Branch of: Omaha Public Library

Other information
- Website: omahacentrallibrary.org

Omaha Central Library is a public library in Omaha, Nebraska, United States. It is the main branch of the Omaha Public Library system. The four-story library was designed by Omaha-based HDR, Inc. and Alley Poyner Marchietto. Omaha Central Library features local artwork around the building. The library also features an Automatic Storage and Retrieval System, which is the only of its kind in a public library in the United States. The second floor of the library includes Do Space, a community technology center. The third floor is the Genealogy and Local History area.

The Omaha Public Library system was formed in 1872 and opened its first permanent location, designed by Thomas Rogers Kimball, in 1894. After outgrowing its previous location, Omaha Public Library moved its central library to the W. Dale Clark Library in 1977. By the 2010s, the W. Dale Clark Library itself was considered outdated. The library closed in 2022, while a new library, Omaha Central Library, was announced that same year. Construction began in 2023, and the library officially opened on April 19, 2026.

== History ==
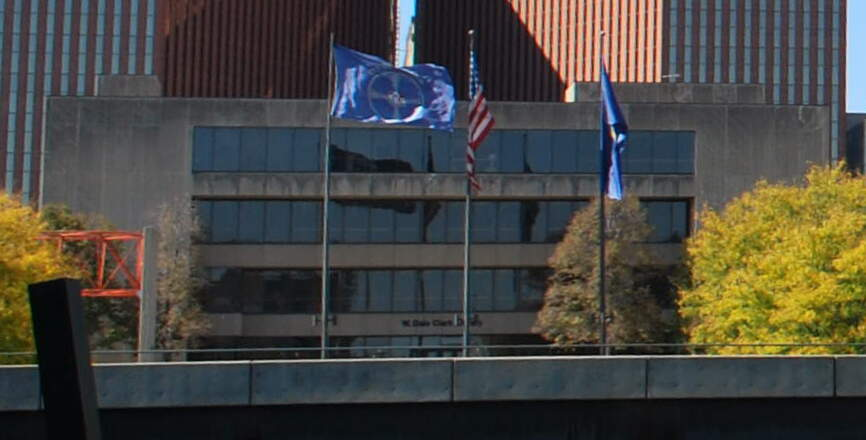
Omaha Central Library replaced the former W. Dale Clark Library in Downtown Omaha

=== Background ===
The Omaha Public Library system was formed in 1872, originally located on the second floor of the Simpson Carriage factory at 14th & Dodge Street. Originally a private library, it later became a public library in 1877. The system moved into its first permanent home in 1894 near South 19th & Harney Streets. The Second Renaissance Revival style building was designed by future Nebraska Hall of Fame inductee Thomas Rogers Kimball. Following years of disrepair and limited space, a replacement for the original Omaha Public Library building was announced in 1974.

Its replacement, the W. Dale Clark Library, opened in 1977. The library was built during a time of urban renewal for Omaha and was built adjacent to the Gene Leahy Mall. The W. Dale Clark Library underwent one major renovation in 2000. It was demolished in 2022 to make way for the Mutual of Omaha Headquarters Tower. The library was replaced with a downtown branch in the Old Market, which opened in 2023.

=== Development ===
By the 2010s, the W. Dale Clark Library was considered outdated for role as the main library. Several sites were considered, including one at the site of the former Omaha Civic Auditorium. However, the current site at 72nd & Dodge was selected to give more priority to the entire metropolitan area, rather than just the urban core. Located on the site was Do Space, which had recently renovated the former Borders building for its use in 2015. Fundraising was performed by Heritage Omaha, who raised $138 million for the project.

=== Construction ===
Omaha Central Library began construction in 2023, following the demolition of the former Do Space building. Do Space relocated to the Abrahams Library. The crane was removed in February 2025. Construction of the library was officially completed in November 2025. It officially opened on April 19, 2026.

== Collection ==
=== Local art ===
Omaha Central Library features artwork by 16 Omaha-area artists, all of which are displayed around the library. All of the artwork was created during the library's construction. The artwork selected for the library includes sculptures, some of which are placed on public display outside the library.

=== Automatic Storage and Retrieval System ===
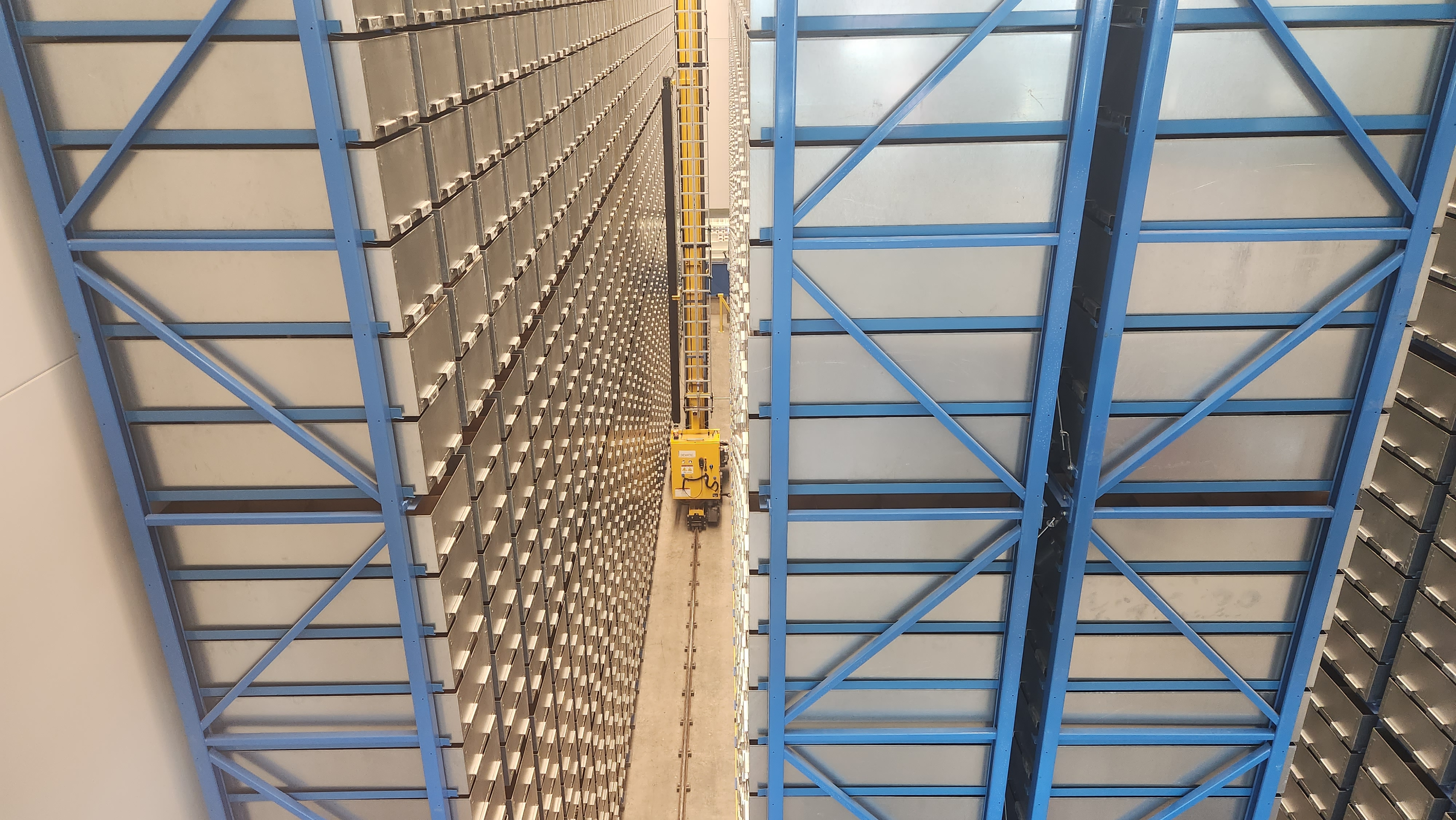
Automatic Storage and Retrieval System in 2026

Omaha Central Library features an Automatic Storage and Retrieval System (ASRS). Located in the center of the building, the system spans four stories and can hold up to 600,000 volumes. It is the only system of its kind in a public library in the United States. Currently, it is used to store the library's lesser requested titles.

=== Do Space ===
Located on the second floor, Do Space is the community technology center located in Omaha Central Library. Do Space previously occupied the site from 2015 to 2023. Do Space includes 3D printers, public computers, a textile lab, and a podcast studio, all of which are free to use.

=== Genealogy and Local History ===
The Genealogy and Local History section of the library is located on the third floor. The Genealogy and Local History section contains computers, microfilm readers, and scanners. The section also provides several books relating to that of local history in the area.

== Design ==
Upon Omaha Central Library's opening, it became the largest library in the Omaha Public Library system and serves as a replacement for the W. Dale Clark Library. The library was designed by HDR, Inc. and Alley Poyner Marchietto, and was built by Kiewit Corporation. The library is four stories tall and has a glass facade. Do Space is located on the second floor of the library.
