= Kristen Constant =

American engineer

- Born: Coronado, California, US

Academic background
- Education: BSc, Ceramic Engineering, 1986, Iowa State University; PhD, Materials Science and Engineering, 1990, Northwestern University

Kristen P. Constant is an American engineer. She is the Vice President and Chief Information Officer at Iowa State University and a Fellow of the American Association for the Advancement of Science.

== Early life and education ==
Constant was born in Coronado, California, and graduated from high school in Osceola, Iowa. She earned her Bachelor of Science degree in ceramic engineering at Iowa State University and her PhD from Northwestern University. Following her PhD, Constant completed a post-doctoral fellowship at the Massachusetts Institute of Technology and as a laboratory graduate at the Argonne National Laboratory.

== Career ==
Constant joined the materials science and engineering faculty as an assistant professor at her Alma mater, Iowa State, in 1992. Two years later, she received a $180,000 grant from the Watlow Electric Manufacturing Co. of St. Louis to "study ways to improve the reliability and performance of ceramic insulating materials used in the company's products." In June 2012, Constant was appointed Chair of the Iowa State University’s College of Engineering materials science and engineering program. A few years later, she was recognized with a Morrill Professorship title.

By 2017, Constant had joined the Materials Division and the Women in Engineering Division and as the program chair and Division Chair in the Women in Engineering Division. She also served in leadership roles of the American Society for Engineering Education (ASEE) Diversity Committee. She was later elected a Fellow of the ASEE for being an "influential leader." In the same year, Constant was selected to replace Jim Kurtenbach as their new interim Vice President and Chief Information Officer. Upon being appointed to this role, she became one of four female CIOs at Big Twelve peer universities. During the COVID-19 pandemic, Constant was elected a fellow of the American Association for the Advancement of Science for her "distinguished contributions to the design and fabrication of photonic structures and her influential role in materials engineering education and broadening participation in STEM disciplines." In 2025, Constant was reappointed Iowa State's vice president for information technology services and chief information officer.
