= Charles B. Washington =

American journalist (1923–1986)

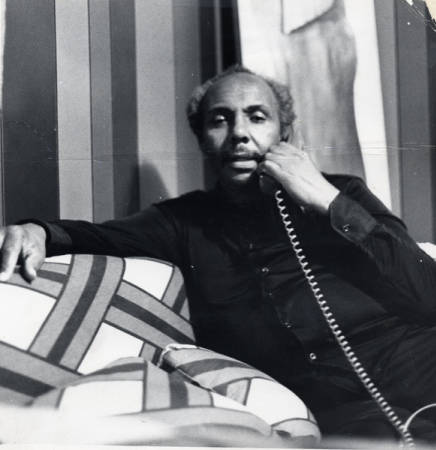

Charles B. Washington (December 1, 1923 – April 28, 1986) was an American civil rights activist, journalist, and mentor from Omaha, Nebraska. He is best known for his work in North Omaha from the 1940s until his death.

== Career ==
Washington was initially the sports editor for The Omaha Star prior to attending Oakwood College and was reportedly the youngest editor of any independent black newspaper in the country. In 1944, he was hired by City Recreation director George Vanous and managed softball and baseball teams in the city. He later returned to the Star as a reporter and interviewed Malcolm X for the publication. When he retired from the paper, he had worked as an editor there for 48 years.

Washington was also a well-known local television personality as host of the Urban League-sponsored program Omaha, Can We Do?, which aired on local NBC affiliate WOWT.

On September 14, 1986, the North Branch of the Omaha Public Library was renamed after Washington.

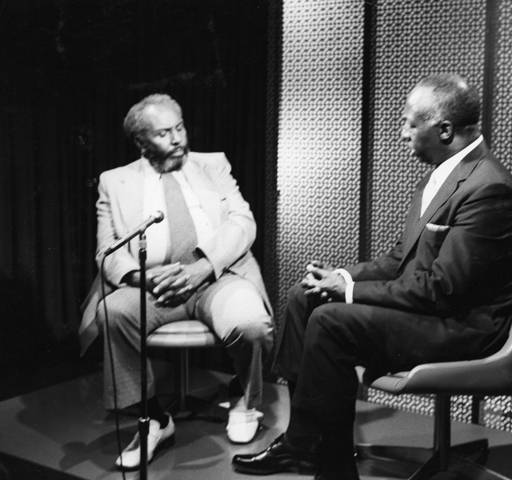
Washington on the set of Omaha, Can We Do?
