= Kenneth De Groot =

American politician (1929–1993)

Member of the Iowa House of Representatives from the 8th district
- In office January 10, 1983 – January 10, 1993
- Preceded by: Clifford Branstad
- Succeeded by: Daniel P. Fogarty

Member of the Iowa House of Representatives from the 1st district
- In office January 8, 1979 – January 9, 1983
- Preceded by: Elmer Den Herder
- Succeeded by: James D. O'Kane

Personal details
- Born: Kenneth Roy De Groot; October 16, 1929 Perkins, Iowa, U.S.
- Died: April 22, 1993 (aged 63) Doon, Iowa, U.S.
- Party: Republican
- Spouse: Clarretta Risseeuw
- Children: 4
- Education: Iowa State University; Northwestern College
- Website: Kenneth De Groot at the Iowa Legislature

Kenneth Roy De Groot (October 16, 1929 – April 22, 1993) was an American politician who sat in the Iowa House of Representatives between 1979 and 1993 as a member of the Republican Party. He held the District 1 seat until 1983, when he began representing District 8.

De Groot was born in Perkins, Iowa on October 16, 1929. He was a graduate of Hull High School, and pursued tertiary education at Iowa State University and Northwestern College. After college, De Groot became a dairy farmer for 42 years. Alongside his sons, De Groot owned and operated DG Valley-View Farms. De Groot held membership and executive positions in several agricultural collectives, companies, and associations, among them, 4-H, the Dairy Herd Improvement Association, the Land O'Lakes Northwest Iowa Dairy Division, and the Farm Bureau.

De Groot moved to Doon in 1978, and served in the Iowa House of Representatives between 1979 and 1993 as a member of the Republican Party. He held the District 1 seat until 1983, when he began representing District 8.

De Groot died on April 22, 1993, months after completing his seventh and final term in office. A lung cancer diagnosis in late 1991 influenced his decision to retire from the Iowa General Assembly. He was additionally diagnosed with brain cancer in early 1993.
