= Do Space =

Non-profit community technology center in Omaha, Nebraska, U.S.

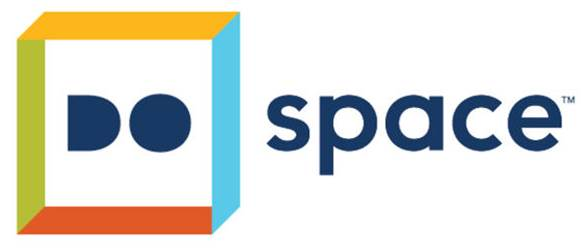

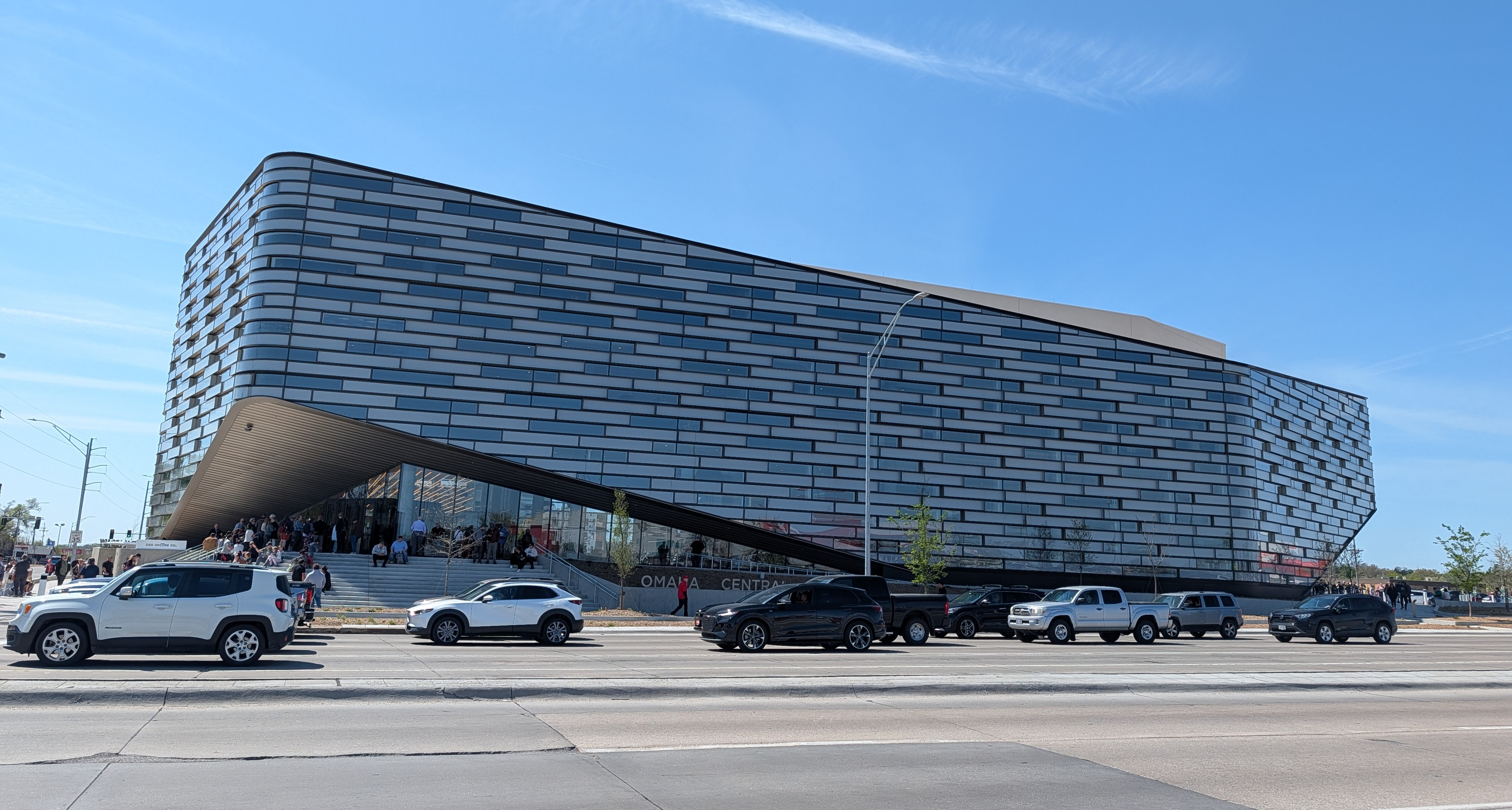
- Do Space's current location, Omaha Central Library
- Established: November 2015
- Location: 7205 Dodge Street, Omaha, Nebraska, U.S. 68114
- Coordinates: 41.258972°N 96.024667°W
- Public transit access: Metro Area Transit; Buses: 2, 8, 18, 92, 98
- Website: dospace.org

Do Space is a 501(c)(3) non-profit community technology center in Omaha, Nebraska, United States. The center's services include a digital library, an educational center, and small makerspace featuring 3D printing technology. The library opened in 2015. Since 2026, Do Space has been located on the second floor of Omaha Central Library.

== History ==
Do Space was announced in 2014 as Omaha's first digital library, to be located in a former Borders Bookstore in central Omaha, at 72nd and Dodge Streets just west of the University of Nebraska Omaha. The building underwent major renovations in 2015, and officially opened that fall. The building was designed by HDR, Inc. and was remodeled by Kiewit Corporation.

Do Space began partnerships with various organizations, including Metropolitan Community College and Omaha Public Library. Do Space is managed by the non-profit Community Information Trust, which itself is managed by local Omaha philanthropic organization, Heritage Services.

In 2023, the building was demolished to make way for the construction of the Omaha Central Public Library. In preparation for the construction, Do Space resources were temporarily moved to the Milton R. Abrahams Branch of the Omaha Public Library near 90th and Fort Streets. Do Space began to occupy the second floor of the Omaha Central Library upon its completion in April 2026.

== Services ==
Patrons can use Apple, Windows, and Ubuntu computers that have office, CAD and graphics programs and can access Omaha Public Library databases while at Do Space. Do Space also has tablets and laptops for use, as well a 3D lab that has 3D printers, 3D scanners, and a laser cutter. There are large-format printers as well as break-out rooms with touch screen bulletin boards.

Do Space provides its services free to the public, except for expendables like printing and 3D materials. There are dedicated spaces for small children, teens, as well as adults. There is a group specifically geared towards seniors that incorporates peer-style information-sharing. Metropolitan Community College held classes on the second floor of the original building. Do Space provides a meeting space to nurture an innovation incubator and various community tech groups meet there.

== Leadership ==
In February 2015, Rebecca Stavick, co-founder of the civic hacking group Open Nebraska and former Omaha Public Library employee, was hired as the executive director of Do Space. Michael Sauers, formerly with the Nebraska Library Commission, is the Director of Technology.
