= Richard Weldon =

Richard Weldon may refer to:

- Richard B. Weldon Jr. (born 1958), state senator in Maryland
- Richard Chapman Weldon (1849–1925), Canadian law professor
- Richard L. Weldon (1932–2020), Canadian politician

== See also ==
- Richard W. Welden (1908–1992)! American politician from Iowa
