= Mary Madison =

American politician (born 1950)

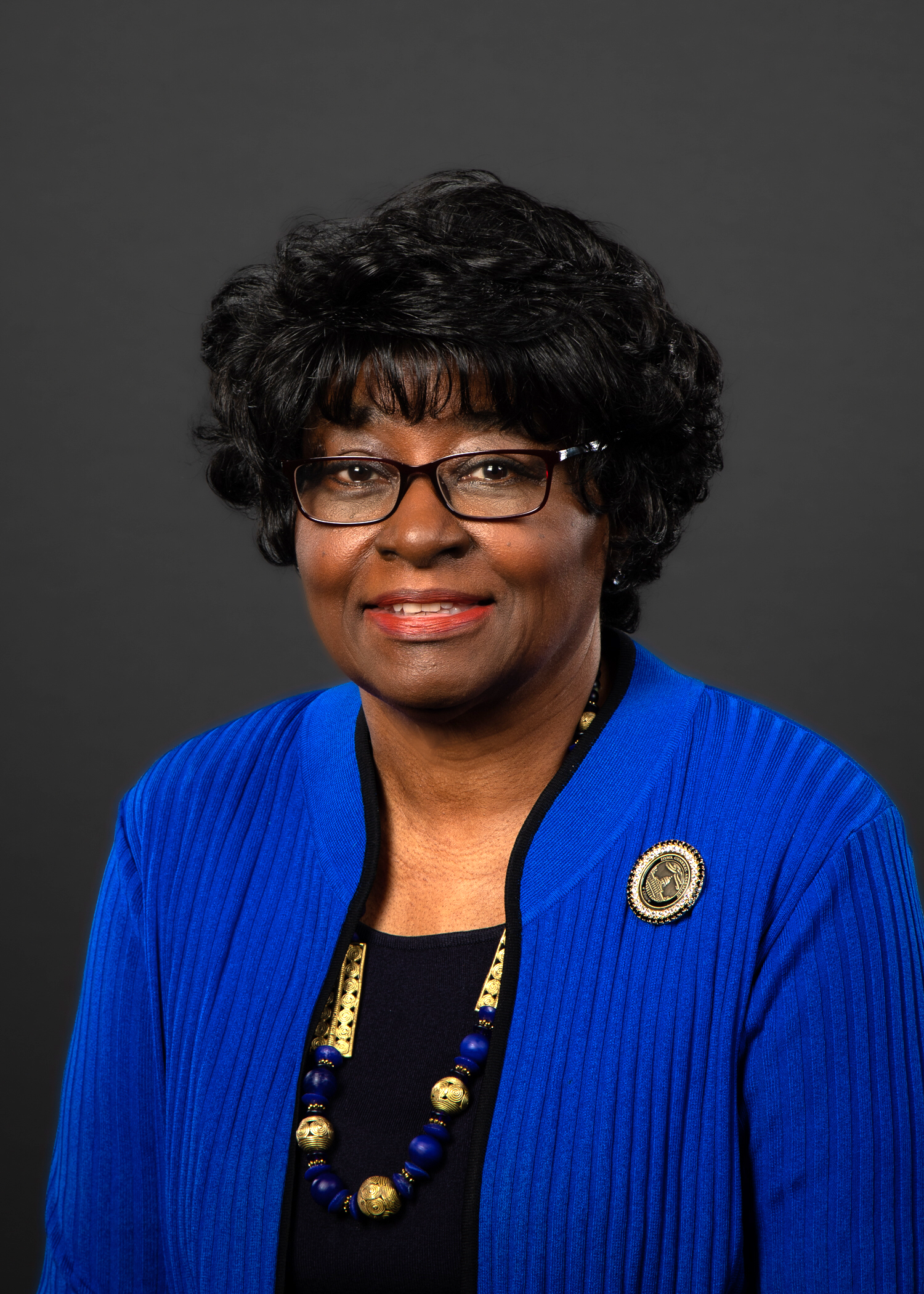

Member of the Iowa House of Representatives from the 31st district
- Incumbent
- Assumed office January 9, 2023
- Preceded by: Rick Olson (redistricting)

Personal details
- Born: 1950 (age 75–76) South Carolina, U.S.
- Party: Democratic
- Spouse: L. Keith
- Children: 3
- Education: Saint Peter's University; Seton Hall University (M.Ed); Tarleton State University (MA); Interdenominational Theological Center (MDiv)
- Occupation: Educator, minister, social worker

Mary Lee Madison (born 1950) is an American politician, minister and educator who has represented the 31st district in the Iowa House of Representatives since January 2023, which consists of parts of southwest Polk County and a very small part of southeast Dallas County, including most of West Des Moines. She is a member of the Democratic Party.

== Early life ==
Madison was born in 1950 in South Carolina and was raised in Jersey City, New Jersey. She received a bachelor's degree from Saint Peter's University, a Master of Education from Seton Hall University, a Master of Arts from Tarleton State University, and a Master of Divinity from the Interdenominational Theological Center.

== Political career ==
Following decennial redistricting in 2021, Madison announced her intent to run for the open 31st district seat in the Iowa House of Representatives in early 2022. She won the Democratic primary on June 7, 2022, against Michael Andreski, a professor, with over 62 percent of the vote, and went on to win the general election on November 8 against Republican Justin Pearson with over 56 percent of the vote.

Madison is a member of the Economic Growth and Technology, Education, Health and Human Services, and Transportation committees.

In 2024 Madison filed to run for reelection. She won the Democratic primaries unopposed on June 4, 2024, and will run in the general election unopposed on November 5, 2024.

Madison has said that her priorities include public education, mental health and reproductive rights. She is pro-choice and supports stricter gun control.

=== Committee assignments ===
As of January 2026, Madison serves on the following committees in the Iowa House.

- Environmental Protection (ranking member)
- Economic Growth and Technology
- Education
- Transportation

== Personal life ==
Madison is a licensed school counselor, social worker and ordained minister. She is married to L. Keith Madison, a radiologist, with whom she has three adult children and one grandchild. She has resided in West Des Moines for over twenty years. She is a member of the St. Paul A.M.E. Church, Alpha Kappa Alpha, NAACP, Des Moines Women's Club, The Links, Interfaith Allegiance of Iowa, Questers and Women's Missionary Society.

== Electoral history ==
Election	Political result	Candidate	Party	Votes	%
Iowa House of Representatives Democratic primary elections, 2022; District 31; Turnout: 2,415	Democratic (newly redistricted)	Mary Madison	Democratic	1,513	62.7
Iowa House of Representatives Democratic primary elections, 2022; District 31; Turnout: 2,415	Democratic (newly redistricted)	Michael Andreski	Democratic	896	37.1
Iowa House of Representatives Democratic primary elections, 2022; District 31; Turnout: 2,415	Democratic (newly redistricted)	Other/Write-in votes		6	0.2
Iowa House of Representatives general elections, 2022; District 31; Turnout: 14,230	Democratic (newly redistricted)	Mary Madison	Democratic	8,038	56.5
Iowa House of Representatives general elections, 2022; District 31; Turnout: 14,230	Democratic (newly redistricted)	Justin Pearson	Republican	6,181	43.4
Iowa House of Representatives general elections, 2022; District 31; Turnout: 14,230	Democratic (newly redistricted)	Other/Write-in votes		11	0.1
