= Semor Tofte =

American politician

Member of the Iowa House of Representatives from the 31st district
- In office January 10, 1983 – January 13, 1985
- Preceded by: Perry Hummel
- Succeeded by: Paul W. Johnson

Member of the Iowa House of Representatives from the 16th district
- In office January 8, 1973 – January 9, 1983
- Preceded by: James E. Wirtz
- Succeeded by: Clifford Branstad

Personal details
- Born: August 30, 1911 Tofte, Minnesota
- Died: November 21, 1994 (aged 83) Rochester, Minnesota
- Party: Republican

Semor C. Tofte (August 30, 1911 – November 21, 1994) was an American politician, from the Republican Party, who served in the Iowa House of Representatives from 1973 to 1985.

He died of a heart attack on November 21, 1994, in Rochester, Minnesota at age 83.
