= Clifford Branstad =

American politician (1924–2014)

Member of the Iowa House of Representatives from the 16th district
- In office January 10, 1983 – January 12, 1997
- Preceded by: Semor C. Tofte
- Succeeded by: Henry Rayhons

Member of the Iowa House of Representatives from the 8th district
- In office January 8, 1979 – January 9, 1983
- Preceded by: Terry Branstad
- Succeeded by: Kenneth De Groot

Personal details
- Born: Clifford Orville Branstad; April 23, 1924 Thompson, Iowa
- Died: November 10, 2014 (aged 90) Lake Mills, Iowa
- Party: Republican
- Spouse: Grace Martin (m. 1947–2014)

Clifford Orville Branstad (April 23, 1924 – November 10, 2014) was an American politician who served in the Iowa House of Representatives between 1979 and 1997.

Born in Thompson, Iowa, and one of five children to Lydia Siekmeier and Philip A. G. Branstad, Clifford Branstad attended the local high school, but left in January 1943 to enlist in the Army Air Corps, where he served 43 months, flying 41 missions for the Army Air Force. Upon his return to the United States and still without a high school diploma, Branstad enrolled at the Dunwoody Institute in Minnesota. He then earned a bachelor's degree in sociology and economics from the University of Iowa in 1948 after having studied at Central State Teachers College in Wisconsin. Branstad later became a pre-law student at Georgetown University and then moved to Chicago to work in the insurance industry.

Branstad began farming near Thompson in 1951, and began his political career by contesting the state legislative elections of 1978, succeeding his second cousin Terry Branstad as state representative from the eighth district in January 1979. He won a second term in 1980, and from 1983 to his retirement in 1997 represented the sixteenth district. In December 2006, Branstad was awarded a high school diploma from North Iowa High School, which had formed from a merger between Thompson and Buffalo Center-Rake-Lakota High Schools in 1996.

Branstad was a Lutheran. He died in 2014, aged 90, survived by his wife, Grace Martin, whom he had married in 1947, and four of his five children.
