= Jim Kurtenbach =

American politician (born 1957)

James Kurtenbach
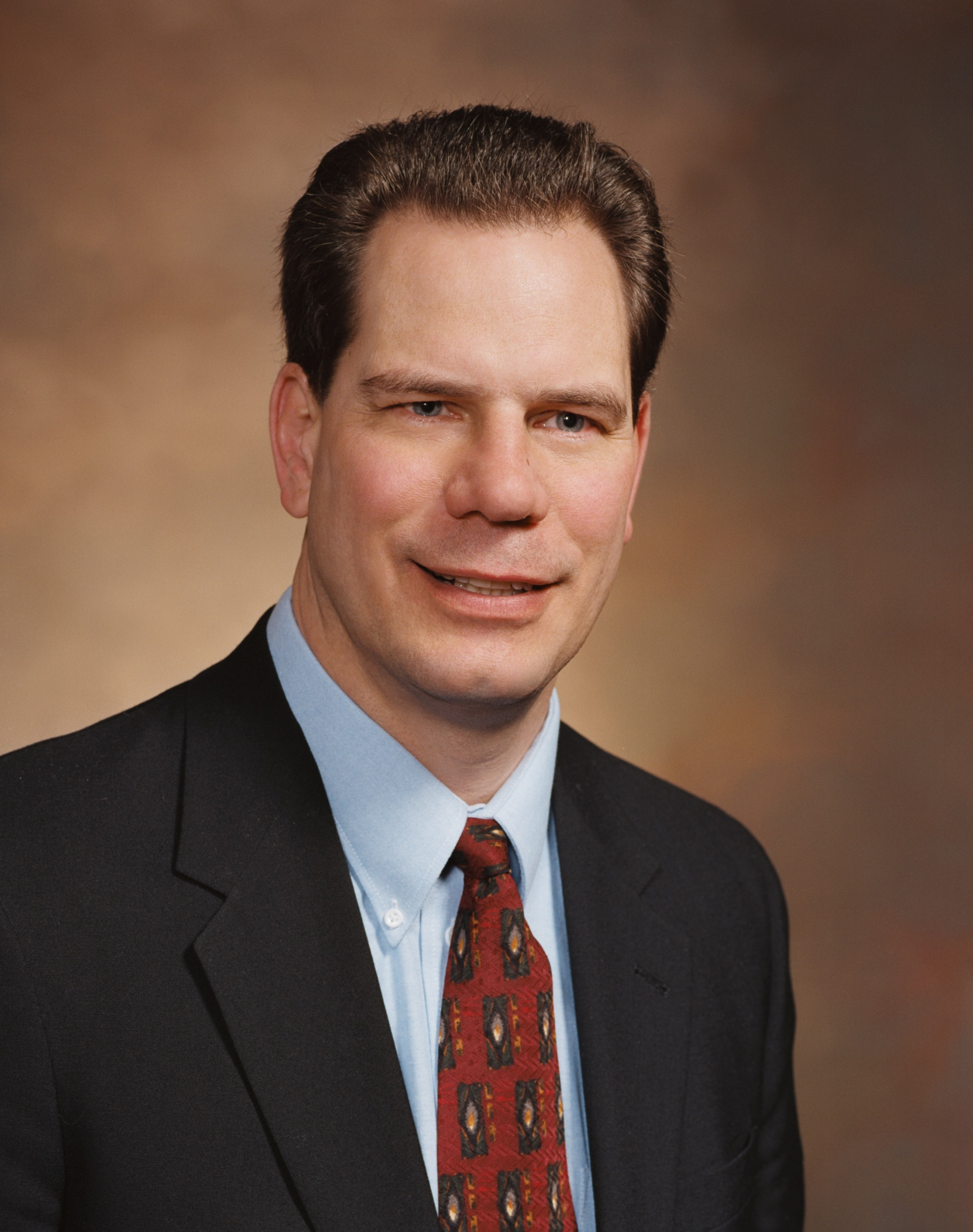

Member of the Iowa House of Representatives from the 10th district
- In office January 13, 2003 – January 7, 2007
- Preceded by: Russell Eddie
- Succeeded by: Dave Deyoe

Personal details
- Born: February 20, 1957 (age 69) Waterloo, Iowa, United States
- Party: Republican
- Spouse: Annmarie
- Children: two
- Occupation: academic

James M. Kurtenbach (born February 20, 1957) is an American politician. After serving as chair of the Republican Party in Story County, Iowa, Kurtenbach was elected to two terms on the Iowa House of Representatives from 2003 to 2007, and led the Republican Party of Iowa as co-chair from 2009 to 2011. Kurtenbach has held administrative and faculty positions at Iowa State University.

== Early life, education, and academic career ==
Kurtenbach was born in Waterloo, Iowa. He attended Iowa State University, the University of Tulsa, and University of Missouri (PhD).

Kurtenbach joined the Iowa State University faculty in 1991, and received tenure in 1997. Between 2010 and 2013, Kurtenbach was an associate dean for admissions in the College of Engineering. After serving as an interim leader since January 2015, Kurtenbach became Iowa State University's vice president and chief information officer in 2016, and resigned the position the following year. Kurtenbach then resumed an associate professorship within the Ivy College of Business.

== Political career ==
Kurtenbach was chair of the Story County Republican Party in the early 2000s. He served in the Iowa House of Representatives from 2003 to 2007, all for District 10. Kurtenbach first ran for office in 2002, finishing first in a three-way party primary against James Culter and Ray Holtorf, then defeating incumbent and redistricted legislator Dennis Parmenter. He won reelection in 2004 against Democratic candidate Tracy Runkel. In 2006, Kurtenbach ran for the Iowa Senate. He then led the Mitt Romney 2008 presidential campaign in north central Iowa. Kurtenbach then served as co-chair of the Republican Party of Iowa from 2009 to 2011. In the following election cycle, Kurtenbach joined the Tim Pawlenty 2012 presidential campaign. Governor Kim Reynolds appointed Kurtenbach head of the Iowa Department of Administrative Services in June 2019, and he served until March 2020.
