= Dolores Mertz =

American politician (1928–2022)

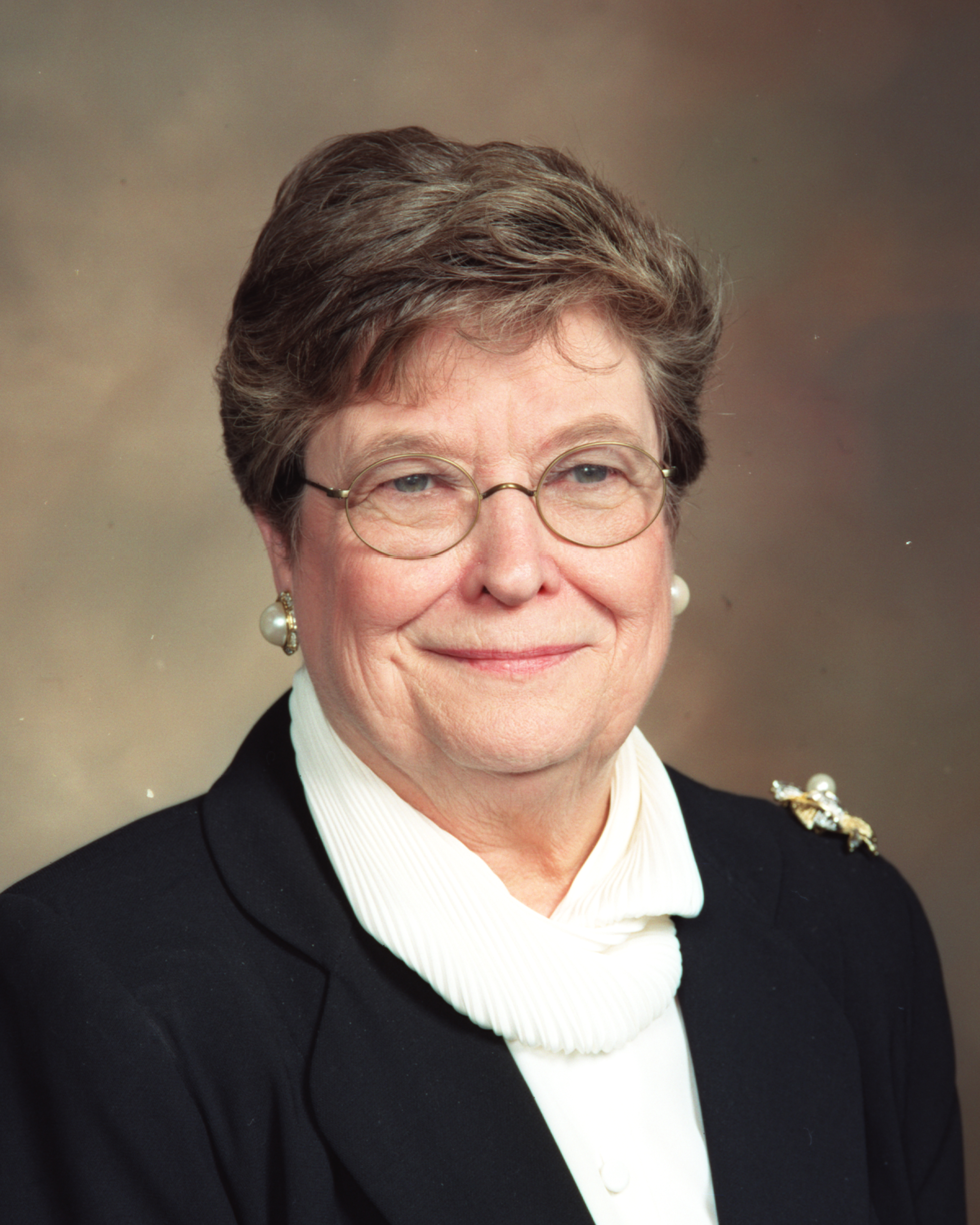

Member of the Iowa House of Representatives from the 8th district 15th (1989–2003)
- In office January 1989 – January 2011
- Preceded by: Marcella Frevert
- Succeeded by: Tom W. Shaw

Personal details
- Born: Dolores Mary Shay; May 30, 1928 Bancroft, Iowa, U.S.
- Died: October 18, 2022 (aged 94) West Bend, Iowa, U.S.
- Party: Democratic

Dolores Mary Mertz (née Shay; May 30, 1928 – October 18, 2022) was an American politician from Iowa.

Born in Bancroft, Iowa to John and Gertrude (née Erickson) Shay, she earned her AA from Briar Cliff College (now Briar Cliff University). She married Pete Mertz in 1951, and following his death in 1983, she was appointed to the Kossuth County Board of Supervisors to fill the remainder of his term.

She served in the Iowa House of Representatives from 1989 through 2011, representing the 15th district from 1989 to 2003 and the 8th district from 2003 to 2011. Mertz served on several committees in the Iowa House – the Judiciary committee; the Natural Resources committee; the Transportation committee; and the Agriculture committee, where she is chair. She also serves on the Agriculture and Natural Resources Appropriations Subcommittee. Her political experience includes twenty-five years as Democrat precinct leader and 13 years on the Kossuth County Central Committee. Mertz was re-elected in 2006 with 8,142 votes, running unopposed.

She also served as co-chairperson on the board of directors of the American Legislative Exchange Council (ALEC), a national association of legislators. In 2012, Governor Terry Branstad appointed Mertz to serve on the Iowa Racing and Gaming Commission.

Mertz died on October 18, 2022, at West Bend Health and Rehabilitation in West Bend, Iowa.

Iowa House of Representatives
Preceded by Sue Mullins	15th District; 1989–2003	Succeeded by Brian Quirk
Preceded by Marcella Frevert	8th District; 2003–2011	Succeeded by Tom W. Shaw
