= Elmer Den Herder =

American politician (1908–1978)

Member of the Iowa House of Representatives from the 1st district
- In office January 11, 1971 – June 2, 1978
- Preceded by: Adrian Brinck
- Succeeded by: Kenneth De Groot

Member of the Iowa House of Representatives from the 81st district
- In office January 14, 1957 – January 10, 1971
- Preceded by: Russell A. Patrick
- Succeeded by: William H. Harbor

Personal details
- Born: August 14, 1908 Sioux Center, Iowa
- Died: June 2, 1978 (aged 69) Sioux Center, Iowa
- Party: Republican

Elmer H. Den Herder (August 14, 1908 – June 2, 1978) was an American politician who served in the Iowa House of Representatives from 1957 to 1978.

He died of cancer on June 2, 1978, in Sioux Center, Iowa at age 69.
