= Ray Zirkelbach =

American politician

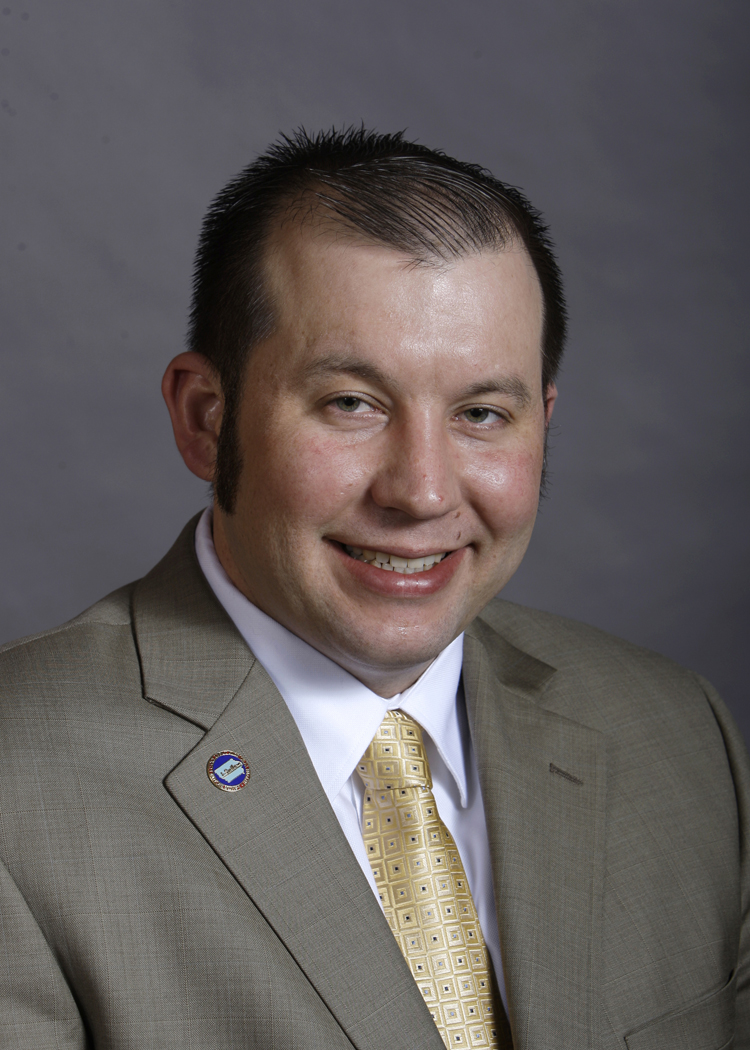

Member of the Iowa House of Representatives from the 31st district
- In office January 10, 2005 – January 9, 2011
- Preceded by: Gene Manternach
- Succeeded by: Lee Hein

Personal details
- Born: October 20, 1978 (age 47) Manchester, Iowa, U.S.
- Party: Democratic
- Spouse: Divorced
- Children: 2 other children; Claire and Owen Zirkelbach
- Education: University of Wyoming (B.A.)
- Website: Zirkelbach's website

Ray S. Zirkelbach (born October 20, 1978) is a former state legislator, prison counselor and soldier. He was raised on a farm in Scotch Grove, Iowa and graduated from Monticello High School in 1997. Zirkelbach served in the Iowa House of Representatives, representing the 31st District, from 2005 to 2011. He was deployed in Iraq as an Iowa National Guard sergeant, in the First Battalion of the 133rd Infantry. He holds a BA from the University of Wyoming in Administration of Justice.

He did not sit in the 2006 or 2007 session of the Iowa House, because he was on active duty with the Iowa National Guard in Iraq.

During his last term in the Iowa House, he was Chair of the Veterans Affairs Committee and a member of the Appropriations, Commerce and Agricultural committees, and was selected to serve on the Justice Systems Appropriations Committee.

Zirkelbach has since continued his public service as a correctional counselor at the Anamosa State Penitentiary and program director of Advancement Services of Jones County. He has focused his efforts in community restoration projects and has since purchased and actively renovates properties in the area.

On November 8, 2015, Zirkelbach announced he intended to explore a campaign for the US Senate. Zirkelbach declined pursuing the nomination, focusing on macro-level social work. Zirkelbach worked as consultant and documentarian for an urban farming project in Flint, Michigan.

== Electoral history ==
Zirkelbach was first elected to the Iowa House in 2004 with 8,712 votes, defeating incumbent Republican opponent Gene Manternach. He was reelected in 2006 with 8,447 votes, running unopposed. He was reelected in 2008 with 9,818 votes, defeating Republican opponent Dena Himes in a campaign that focused on ethanol, wind energy, and veterans affairs.

Zirkelbach endorsed U.S. Senator Christopher Dodd in the 2008 Democratic presidential primaries. He proposed a ban on the sale of imported flags (U.S. flag or Iowa state flag) in Iowa. He lost his bid for reelection in 2010 with 5,431 votes, losing to Republican Lee Hein.

*incumbent

Election	Political result	Candidate	Party	Votes	%
Iowa House of Representatives primary elections, 2004; District 31; Turnout: 1,462	Democratic	Ray Zirkelbach	Democratic	898	61.4
Iowa House of Representatives primary elections, 2004; District 31; Turnout: 1,462	Democratic	Joyce Jarding	Democratic	562	38.4
Iowa House of Representatives elections, 2004; District 31; Turnout: 15,092	Democratic gain from Republican	Ray Zirkelbach	Democratic	8,172	54.1
Iowa House of Representatives elections, 2004; District 31; Turnout: 15,092	Democratic gain from Republican	Gene A. Mantermach*	Republican	6,910	45.8
2006 Iowa House of Representatives elections District 31	Democratic hold	Raymond Zirkelbach*	Democratic	unopposed	
2008 Iowa House of Representatives elections District 31; Turnout: 14,922	Democratic hold	Ray Zirkelbach*	Democratic	9,818	65.8
2008 Iowa House of Representatives elections District 31; Turnout: 14,922	Democratic hold	Dena Himes	Republican	5,096	34.2
2010 Iowa House of Representatives elections District 31; Turnout: 12,040	Republican gain from Democratic	Lee Hein	Republican	6,280	52.2
2010 Iowa House of Representatives elections District 31; Turnout: 12,040	Republican gain from Democratic	Ray Zirkelbach*	Democratic	5,431	45.1

Iowa House of Representatives
Preceded by Gene Manternach	31st District; 2005 – 2011	Succeeded by Lee Hein
