= Omaha Public Library branches =

Libraries in Nebraska, United States

The Omaha Public Library system has thirteen locations across Omaha, Nebraska. The oldest building in the system is the Benson Branch, which was built in 1942. The most recent building is the Omaha Central Library in Central Omaha, which opened in 2026. The following is an index of all major branches in the system.

== Omaha Central Library ==
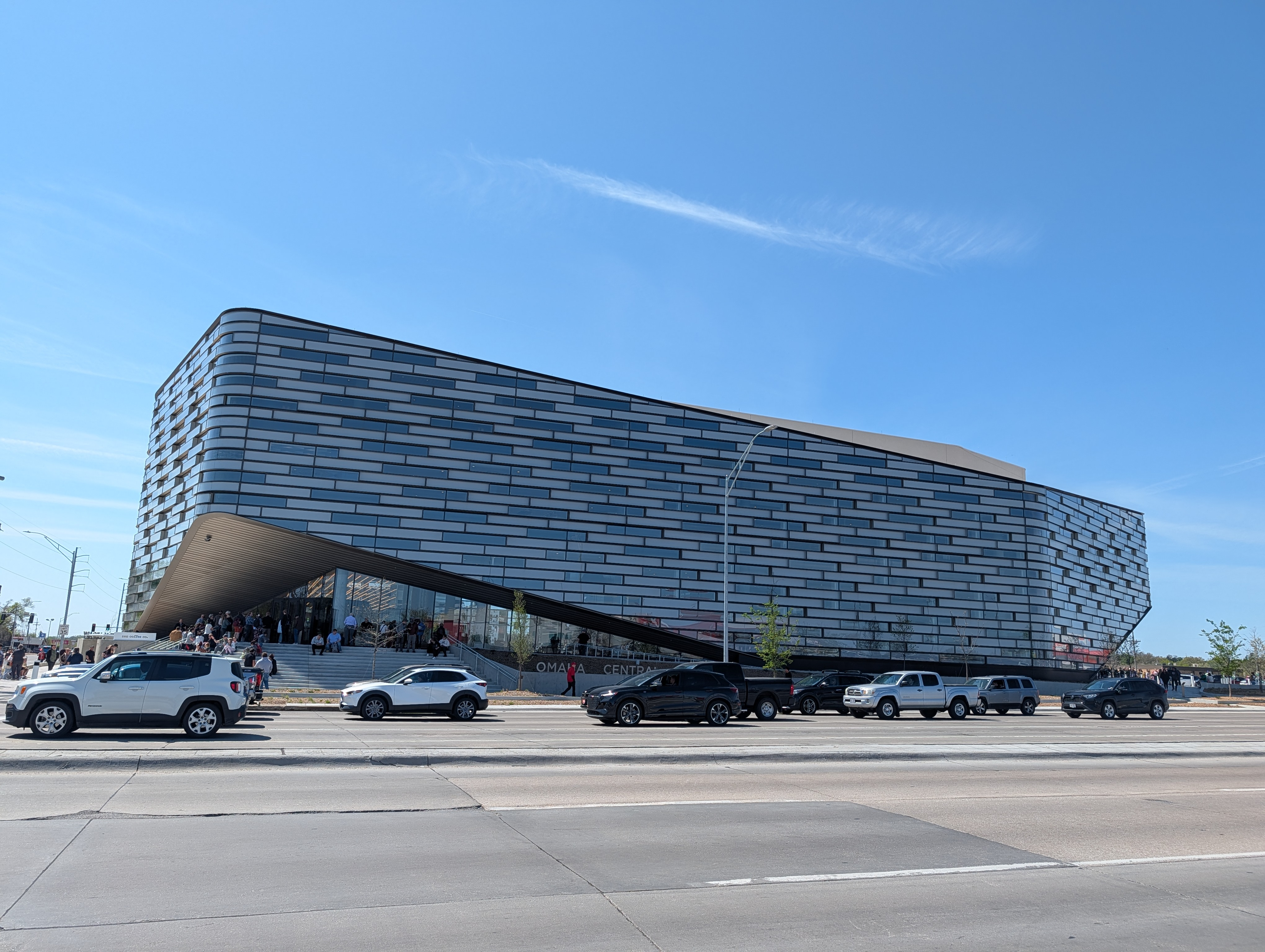
Omaha Central Library on opening day, April 19, 2026

Omaha Central Library is the main branch of Omaha Public Library system. The library was announced in 2022, began construction in 2023, and opened to the public in 2026.. It is built on the former site of Do Space, which is now part of the library. The library serves as a replacement for the former W. Dale Clark Library and is the largest in the system.

== Bess Johnson Elkhorn Branch ==
The Bess Johnson Elkhorn Branch is the Elkhorn branch of the Omaha Public Library system. Originally established as the Elkhorn Public Library, the original library opened in 1925. The library moved to a room in the Elkhorn Town Hall in June 1929. In 1965, it was announced that the library was re-established as a city-owned public library. Additionally, the library would move to a new municipal building. The library officially moved into the building in 1966. In 1984, the library moved to the basement of the municipal building. The library moved to its current location in 1996. After Omaha annexed Elkhorn in 2007, the library became a part of the Omaha Public Library System.

== South Omaha Public Library ==
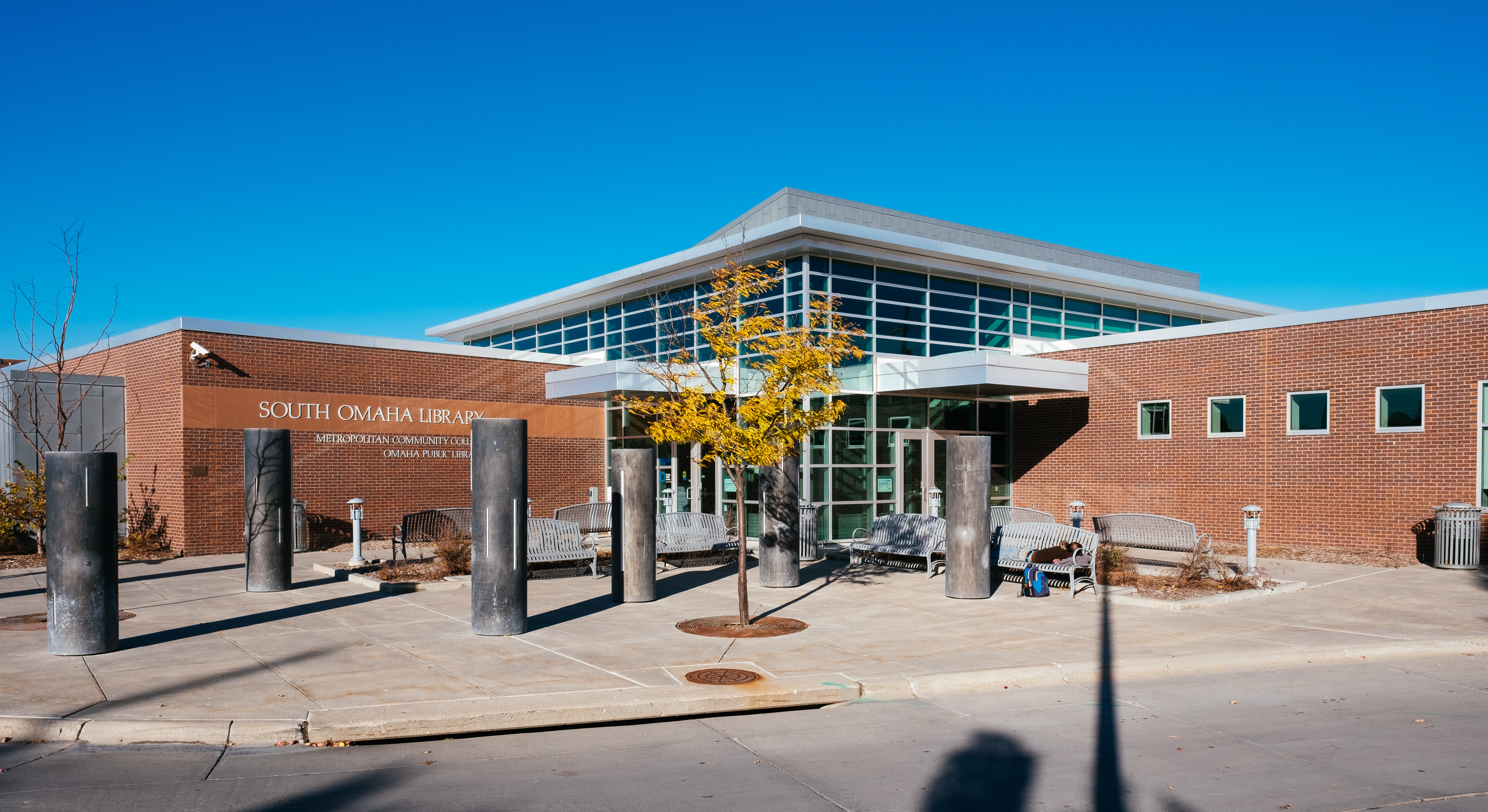
South Omaha Public Library in 2018

The South Omaha Public Library is the South Omaha branch of the Omaha Public Library system. The original library was established in 1889 as a subscription library. It then moved to a Carnegie library located at 2302 M Street that opened in 1905. The most recent building, completed in 2008, features the city of Omaha's largest Spanish language collection and a large collection hosted in partnership between the City of Omaha, the Omaha Public Library and the Omaha's Metropolitan Community College.

== Charles B. Washington Branch ==
The Charles B. Washington Branch is the North Omaha branch of the Omaha Public Library. The library was originally established in December 1921 in an old church building at 25th Street and Ames Avenue. The library moved to a new location at 29th Street and Ames Avenue in January 1938. The library moved to its current location on the same block in 1972. In 1986, the library was re-named for civil-rights activist Charles B. Washington. The library closed in 2005 for major renovations. Renovations included expansion of the building, a community technology center, and a sculpture garden. The library re-opened in 2006, the ceremony included Ice-T in attendance.

== Millard Branch ==
The Millard Branch is the Millard branch of the Omaha Public Library system. The branch was originally established in 1951 by the Women's Project Club. The library moved to the Millard Municipal Building in 1963. The library moved several times again, from a residential home to a shopping mall. Following Millard's annexation by Omaha in 1967, the branch merged into the Omaha Public Library system. The current library was announced in 1977 as part of an expansion plan with two other libraries and opened in 1981. In the late 1990s, the library underwent a major expansion project that tripled its size.

== A. V. Sorensen Branch ==
The A. V. Sorenson Branch is the Dundee location of the Omaha Public Library system. While attempts at making a library for Dundee go back to 1913, it wasn't until the early 1970s that concrete plans were formed. The library was announced in 1973 and was named after former Omaha mayor A. V. Sorensen, who donated the land for the library. The library was established in June 1976. The library closed for renovations in March 2008 and re-opened in November of that same year.

== Benson Branch ==
The Benson Branch is the Benson branch of the Omaha Public Library. The library was established in 1923 and was originally located in the Benson Community Building. The current location of the library was built in 1942 as part of the Works Progress Administration. In the late 1990s, the library underwent a $2 million renovation and expansion project that was completed in 1999.

== Milton R. Abrahams Branch ==
The Milton R. Abrahams Branch is the Keystone branch of the Omaha Public Library system. The library opened in 1988 and was named after Milton R. Abrahams. Abrahams was a member of the library board from 1957 to 1978, and was responsible for the funding and completion of many other libraries in the system. In 2011, the library underwent a $1.2 million renovation project and re-opened in January 2012. The library is currently used by Do Space as a temporary location.

== Willa Cather Branch ==
The Willa Cather Branch is the Southwest branch of the Omaha Public Library system. The library was established in December 1956 and was designed by Leo A. Daly. The library is named for Willa Cather, former Nebraska writer and Pulitzer Prize winner. The library was commonly referred to as the Rainbow Library. In 1986, the library was renovated, and as part of renovations, the rainbow colors were removed to give the library a more modern look.

== Florence Branch ==
The Florence Branch is the Florence branch of the Omaha Public Library system. The library was established in 1923 and was originally located in the Florence Building. In 1935, the library was split into two different branches, moving the library out of the Florence Building and into two community grocery stores. This was an unpopular move, sparking major protests, and the library was eventually moved back. The library's current location opened in 1976 at the Florence Library-Recreation Center. In 2009, when faced with a budget crisis, Omaha Public Library attempted to close Florence. However, two anonymous donors donation of $200,000, combined with the City's donation of $100,000, allowed for the library to stay open. In 2010, the library underwent a remodeling project which renovated and expanded the library. The library re-opened in December 2010.

== W. Clarke Swanson Branch ==
The W. Clarke Swanson Branch is the Central Omaha branch of the Omaha Public Library system. The library was established in 1966 and was named for former C.A. Swanson & Sons Food Company owner W. Clarke Swanson.

== Saddlebrook Branch ==
The Saddlebrook Branch is the Saddlebrook branch of the Omaha Public Library system. The library was announced in 2005 as a joint plan between Omaha Public Schools, the City of Omaha, and Omaha Public Library to make an elementary school that includes a public library and community center. The library officially opened in 2009. Grant money from the State of Nebraska was used to incorporate a green roof, weather stations, and a bioswale providing research for sustainable design in this unique facility designed by BCDM Architects.

== W. Dale Clark Library ==
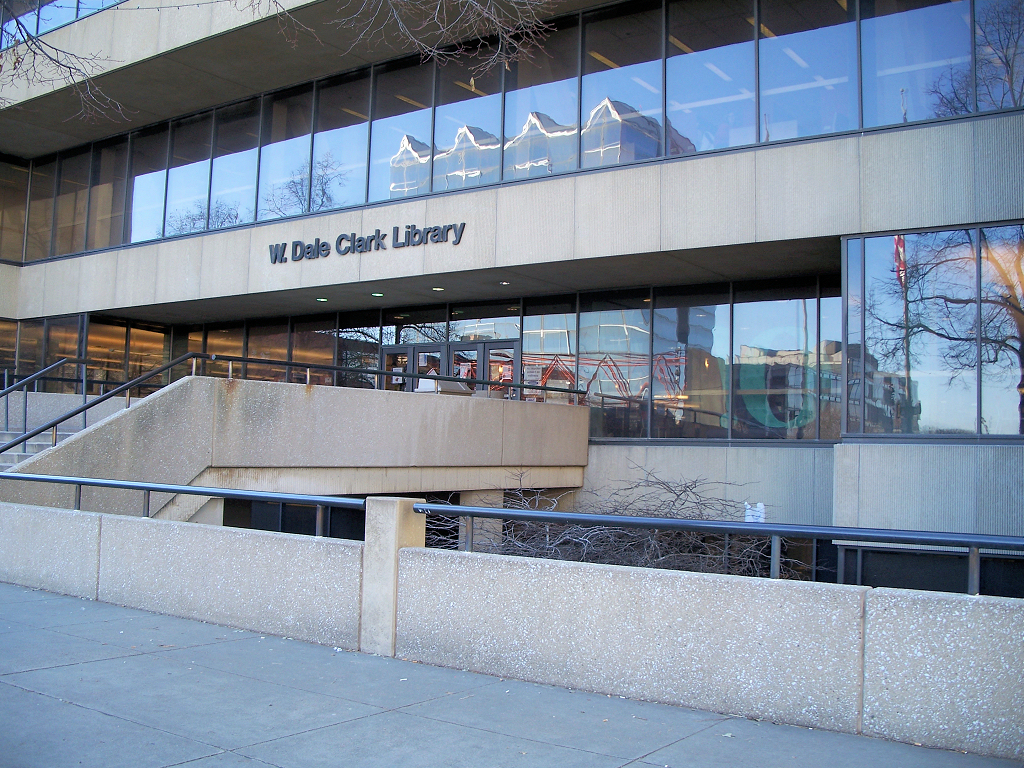
The W. Dale Clark Library in 2008

The W. Dale Clark Library was the main branch of the Omaha Public Library system in Downtown Omaha, Nebraska. Located across from the Gene Leahy Mall, the building used a Brutalist design. The library was announced in 1974 as a replacement for the original Omaha Public Library building. The library began construction in 1975 and officially opened in 1977. The library was designed by Hellmuth, Obata and Kassabaum and Latenser & Sons, Inc. The library underwent renovations in 2000. The library closed in August 2022, and was demolished in October of that same year to make way for the Mutual of Omaha Headquarters Tower. The downtown branch was replaced with a new location at 14th and St. Jones Streets that opened in 2023.

== See also ==
- History of Omaha
- List of libraries in the United States
