= Nebraska Library Commission =

U.S. state government agency

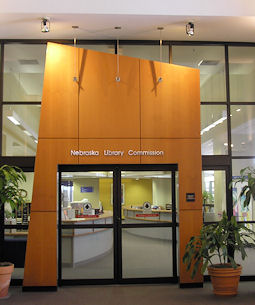

Agency overview
- Formed: 1901
- Headquarters: The Atrium, 1200 N St., Suite 120, Lincoln, NE 68508
- Employees: 49.5
- Annual budget: $5,411,089 (FY 2008/09)
- Agency executive: Rod Wagner, Director
- Website: nlc.nebraska.gov

The Nebraska Library Commission is a Nebraska state government agency. Located in Lincoln, the Library Commission provides reference, resources, training, and consulting for all types of library in the state. The various collections housed at the Library Commission are used to serve librarians, state employees, seekers of government information, and visually handicapped Nebraskans. The Library Commission is a clearinghouse for state government publications and makes many documents accessible online.

The commission is governed by a board of six members who are appointed by the governor for three-year terms. Members are not able to serve more than two consecutive terms. The commission director is appointed by the board. The responsibilities of the director include agency administration and working with the commission staff to execute services and programs.

Nebraska residents are provided access to current magazines, journals, newspapers, genealogical records, and business information through NebraskAccess. Nebraska Memories makes Nebraska-related historical and cultural heritage materials accessible worldwide.

The Talking Book & Braille Service provides free books and magazines on cassette and in Braille to individuals with a visual or physical condition or a reading disability which limits use of regular print. (Their transition to digital books and digital players is currently in progress.) This service is part of a nationwide network of cooperating libraries headed by the National Library Service (NLS), a division of the Library of Congress.

The Library Commission also provides training, both live and online, to librarians throughout the state of Nebraska.

== History ==
The Nebraska Public Library Commission was established by a legislative act in March 1901. The office of the commission was opened in the State Capitol in November 1901. One of the main goals of the commission was to foster the growth of public libraries in Nebraska. Traveling libraries were the first way that the commission spread libraries across the state. Later on, the goal became founding permanent libraries so that patrons who had used traveling libraries could have a long-lasting way of borrowing books.

Due to financial struggles, a bill was passed in 1933 abolishing the Library Commission to cut expenses. The bill created the Nebraska Public Library in place of the commission. In 1935 a new bill was passed that re-established the Nebraska Public Library Commission. The Nebraska Library Association and the Nebraska Federated Women's Clubs were influential in assisting with the movement that led to the return of the commission.

In 1952, the Library of Congress made the commission the official distribution center for the Books for the Blind program in Nebraska. The commission was responsible for buying the equipment necessary to run the program. The Nebraska Public Library Commission changed its name to the Nebraska Library Commission in 1972.

== Statutory authority ==
The Nebraska Library Commission's statutory authority is set forth under Article 4, Chapter 51 of Reissue Revised Statutes of Nebraska. In addition to the powers granted in Chapter 51, state statutes provide that the commission is the state agency designated to receive federal library program funds appropriated for the Library Services and Technology Act.

== Mission ==
The mission of the Nebraska Library Commission is statewide promotion, development, and coordination of library and information services. As the state library agency, the commission is an advocate for the library and information service needs of all Nebraskans.

== Goals ==
- All Nebraskans will have improved access to enhanced library and information services, provided and facilitated by qualified library personnel, boards, and supporters with the knowledge, skills, abilities and attitudes necessary to provide excellent library and information services.
- Nebraska libraries will have appropriate technology to access and deliver online library and information services.

== See also ==
- List of libraries in the United States
