= Henry Rayhons =

American politician

Henry V. Rayhons
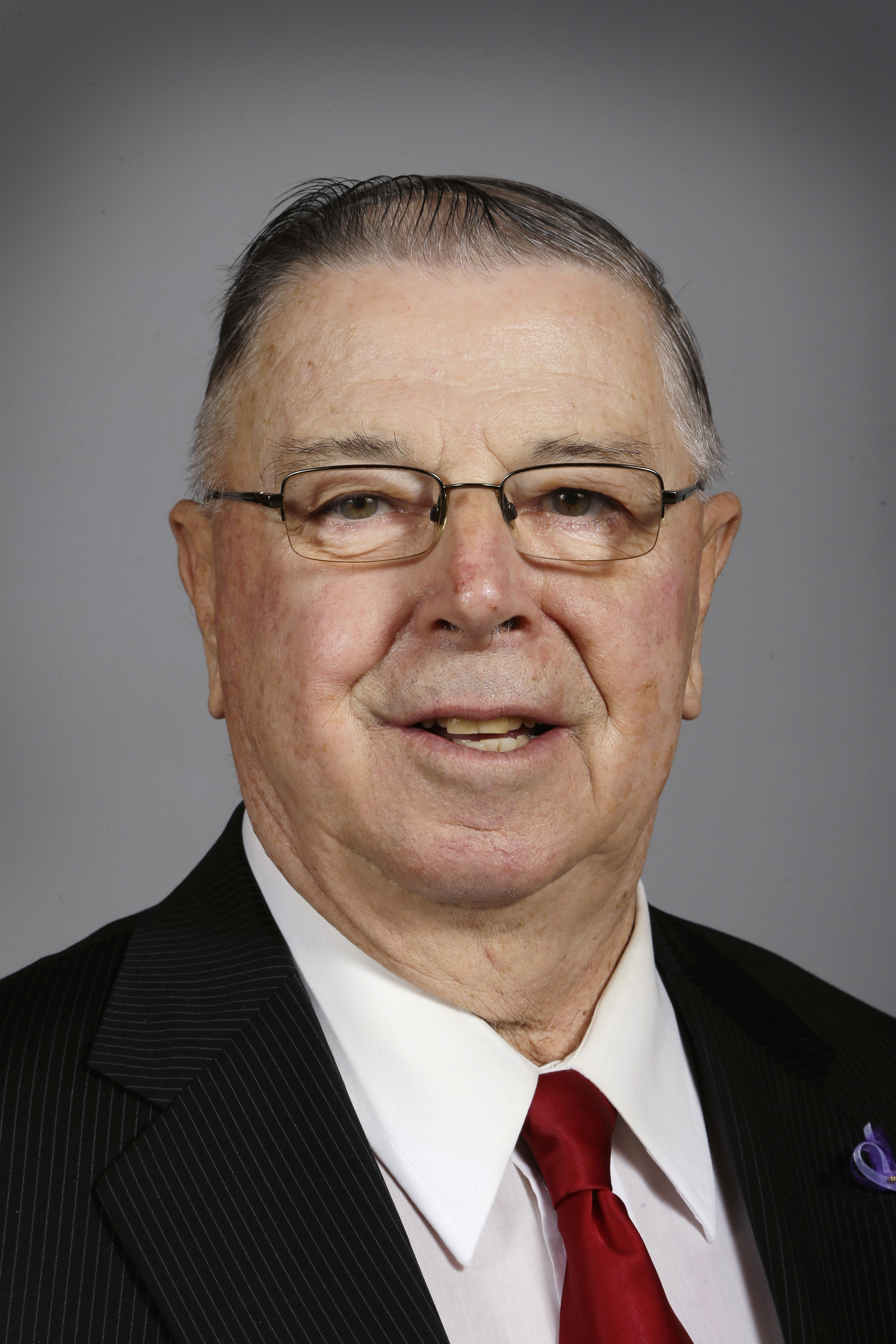

Member of the Iowa House of Representatives from the 8th district 11th (2003–2013) 16th (1997–2003)
- In office January 13, 1997 – January 2015
- Preceded by: Clifford Branstad
- Succeeded by: Terry Baxter

Personal details
- Born: May 8, 1936 Garner, Iowa, U.S.
- Died: April 1, 2021 (aged 84)
- Party: Republican
- Spouse: Marvalyn
- Children: Carol, Dale, Sara, and Gary
- Profession: Farmer
- Website: legis.iowa.gov/...

Henry V. Rayhons (May 8, 1936 – April 1, 2021) was the Iowa State Representative from the 8th District. A Republican, he served in the Iowa House of Representatives from 1997 through 2015, representing the 16th District from 1997 to 2003 and the 11th District from 2003 to 2013. In 2014, Rayhons announced he would not seek reelection to another term.

== Biography ==
Rayhons was born in Garner, Iowa. His father, Henry, Sr. was a farmer and his mother, Agnes, was a homemaker. He grew up in a large family with four brothers and four sisters. Rayhons attended a one-room country school for eight years and graduated from Garner High School in 1954. He did not attend college. Rayhons was first elected in 1996.

Rayhons is a member of the Lion's Club, Iowa Dairy Association, Farm Bureau, Iowa Beef Producers, Iowa Corn Growers Association, Iowa Soybean Association, and the Iowa Taxpayers Association. Prior to his service in the legislature, Rayhons was President of the Hancock County Farm Bureau. Additionally, he was a board member of the Iowa Farm Bureau, 1986–1996, and a Hancock County Soil and Water Conservation Commissioner.

On December 15, 2007, Rayhons married Donna Young, blending their families after the death of Henry's first wife, Marvalyn. Rayhons has four children, two sons and two daughters; Donna had three daughters. Donna died of Alzheimer's disease on August 8, 2014. In the same month, Rayhons was charged with felony sexual abuse in relation to a May 2014 incident where he allegedly had sexual contact with his wife at her nursing home; prior to the incident, Donna's daughters had met with nursing home staff, who in turn advised Mr. Rayhons that his wife no longer had the mental capacity to consent to sex. He was found not guilty at his trial in April 2015. Rayhons died on April 1, 2021.

== Electoral history ==
*incumbent

16th District contests

Election	Political result	Candidate	Party	Votes	%
Iowa House of Representatives primary elections, 1996; District 16; Turnout: 2,285	Republican	Henry Rayhons	Republican	1,325	57.99%
Iowa House of Representatives primary elections, 1996; District 16; Turnout: 2,285	Republican	Marvin G. Gudmonson	Republican	603	26.39%
Iowa House of Representatives general elections, 1996; District 16; Turnout: 11,713	Republican hold	Henry Rayhons	Republican	6,375	54.43%
Iowa House of Representatives general elections, 1996; District 16; Turnout: 11,713	Republican hold	Gloria Goll	Democratic	5,320	45.42%
Iowa House of Representatives primary elections, 1998; District 16	Republican	Henry Rayhons*	Republican	unopposed	
Iowa House of Representatives general elections, 1998; District 16; Turnout: 9,157	Republican hold	Henry Rayhons*	Republican	5,736	62.64%
Iowa House of Representatives general elections, 1998; District 16; Turnout: 9,157	Republican hold	Les Granger	Democratic	3,418	37.33%
Iowa House of Representatives primary elections, 2000; District 16	Republican	Henry Rayhons*	Republican	unopposed	
Iowa House of Representatives general elections, 2000; District 16	Republican hold	Henry Rayhons*	Republican	unopposed	

11th District contests

Election	Political result	Candidate	Party	Votes	%
Iowa House of Representatives primary elections, 2002; District 11	Republican	Henry V. Rayhons*	Republican	unopposed	
Iowa House of Representatives general elections, 2002; District 11	Republican (newly redistricted)	Henry V. Rayhons*	Republican	unopposed	
Iowa House of Representatives primary elections, 2004; District 11	Republican	Henry V. Rayhons*	Republican	unopposed	
Iowa House of Representatives general elections, 2004; District 11	Republican hold	Henry V. Rayhons*	Republican	unopposed	
Iowa House of Representatives primary elections, 2006; District 11	Republican	Henry V. Rayhons*	Republican	unopposed	
Iowa House of Representatives general elections, 2006; District 11; Turnout: 10,768	Republican hold	Henry V. Rayhons*	Republican	5,933	55.10%
Iowa House of Representatives general elections, 2006; District 11; Turnout: 10,768	Republican hold	Ann Fairchild	Democratic	4,388	40.75%
Iowa House of Representatives primary elections, 2008; District 11	Republican	Henry V. Rayhons*	Republican	unopposed	
Iowa House of Representatives general elections, 2008; District 11; Turnout: 15,210	Republican hold	Henry V. Rayhons*	Republican	8,379	55.09%
Iowa House of Representatives general elections, 2008; District 11; Turnout: 15,210	Republican hold	Ann Marie Fairchild	Democratic	6,246	41.07%
Iowa House of Representatives primary elections, 2010; District 11; Turnout: 2,963	Republican	Henry Vincent Rayhons*	Republican	2,030	68.51%
Iowa House of Representatives primary elections, 2010; District 11; Turnout: 2,963	Republican	Dennis M. Olson	Republican	734	24.77%
Iowa House of Representatives general elections, 2010; District 11; Turnout: 11,501	Republican hold	Henry Vincent Rayhons*	Republican	7,286	63.35%
Iowa House of Representatives general elections, 2010; District 11; Turnout: 11,501	Republican hold	Ann Marie Fairchild	Democratic	3,916	34.05%

Election	Political result	Candidate	Party	Votes	%
Iowa House of Representatives primary elections, 2012; District 8 Turnout: 2,564	Republican	Henry V. Rayhons*	Republican	1,428	55.69%
Iowa House of Representatives primary elections, 2012; District 8 Turnout: 2,564	Republican	Bob Dishman	Republican	1,021	39.82%
Iowa House of Representatives general elections, 2012; District 8	Republican (newly redistricted)	Henry V. Rayhons*	Republican	unopposed	

Iowa House of Representatives
Preceded by Clifford Branstad	16th District; 1997–2003	Succeeded by Chuck Gipp
Preceded by Steve Kettering	11th District; 2003–2013	Succeeded by Gary Worthan
Preceded by Tom W. Shaw	8th District; 2013–2015	Succeeded by Terry Baxter
