= Tom W. Shaw =

American politician

Tom Shaw
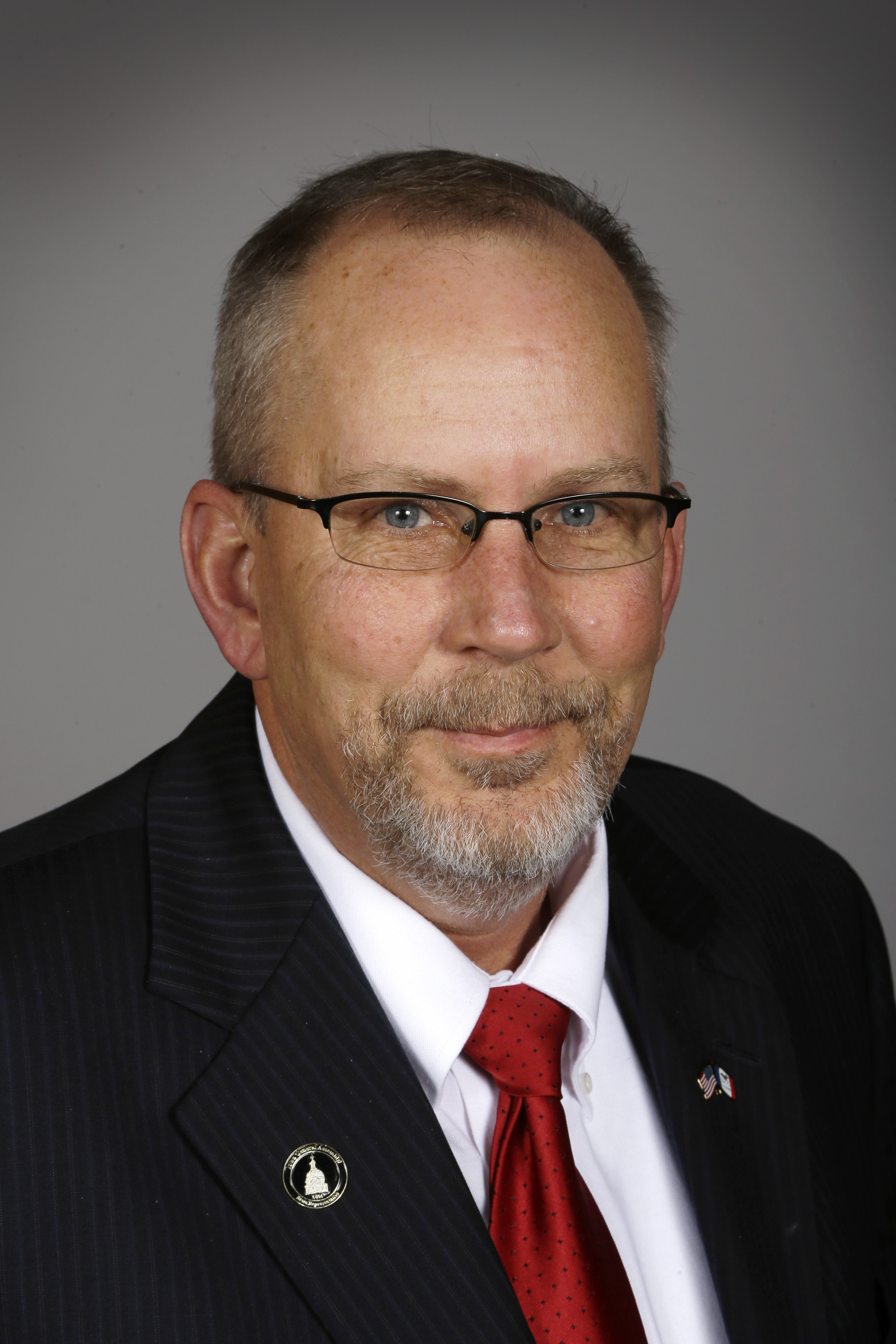

Member of the Iowa House of Representatives from the 10th district 8th (2011 – 2013)
- Incumbent
- Assumed office January 10, 2011
- Preceded by: Dolores Mertz

Personal details
- Born: 1961 (age 64–65) Spencer, Iowa, U.S.
- Party: Republican
- Spouse: Diana
- Children: 3 children
- Education: Metropolitan Community College
- Profession: Peace Officer
- Website: Shaw's website

Tom W. Shaw (born 1961) is the Iowa State Representative from the 10th District. A Republican, he has served in the Iowa House of Representatives since 2011. Shaw was born in Spencer, Iowa and raised in Laurens, Iowa, where he currently resides. He has an A.A. in criminal justice from Metropolitan Community College in Omaha, Nebraska. He served in the United States Navy from 1982-2002. He serves in the Laurens Police Department and has served as Chief of Police.

As of January 2013, Shaw serves on several committees in the Iowa House - the Agriculture, Natural Resources, and Veterans Affairs committees. He also serves as the vice chair of the Ethics committee and of the Public Safety committee.

== Biography ==
Tom was born and raised in Laurens, Iowa. He attended Laurens-Marathon School graduating in 1979. In 1982 Tom enlisted in the United States Navy and attained the rank of Senior Chief Petty Officer. After 20 years of service he retired in 2002. He participated in numerous operations including Operation Desert Shield. His awards include the Joint Service Commendation Medal, Navy Commendation Medal (3), Good Conduct Medal (5), National Defense Medal, Southwest Asia Service Medal, the Kuwait Liberation Medal, and various service ribbons.

After his retirement, Tom decided to put to use his two-year degree in Criminal Justice. Upon hearing of an opening in the Laurens Police Department, he and his wife moved back to his hometown. He quickly moved his way up the ranks and was appointed as Chief of Police in 2006.

Through the years he has been involved with helping local Boy Scout troops, organizing veteran’s memorial events and raising money for charities.

He is a member of the Veterans of Foreign Wars, the National Rifle Association, Gun Owners of America, Iowa Gun Owners, and the Patrick Henry Caucus.

== Electoral history ==
*incumbent

Election	Political result	Candidate	Party	Votes	%
Iowa House of Representatives primary elections, 2010; District 8 Turnout: 3,025	Republican	Tom W. Shaw	Republican	1,545	51.07%
Iowa House of Representatives primary elections, 2010; District 8 Turnout: 3,025	Republican	Stephen Richards	Republican	1,108	36.63%
Iowa House of Representatives general elections, 2010; District 8 Turnout: 11,423	Republican gain from Democratic	Tom W. Shaw	Republican	7,304	63.94%
Iowa House of Representatives general elections, 2010; District 8 Turnout: 11,423	Republican gain from Democratic	Susan G. Bangert	Democratic	3,753	32.85%
Iowa House of Representatives primary elections, 2012; District 10; Turnout: 2,285	Republican	Tom W. Shaw*	Republican	1,468	64.25%
Iowa House of Representatives primary elections, 2012; District 10; Turnout: 2,285	Republican	Maison Bleam	Republican	791	34.62%
Iowa House of Representatives general elections, 2012; District 10	Republican (newly redistricted)	Tom W. Shaw*	Republican	unopposed	

Iowa House of Representatives
Preceded by Dolores Mertz	8th District; 2011 – 2013	Succeeded by Henry Rayhons
Preceded by Dave Deyoe	10th District; 2013 – present	Succeeded by Incumbent
