= Dave Deyoe =

American politician (born 1960)

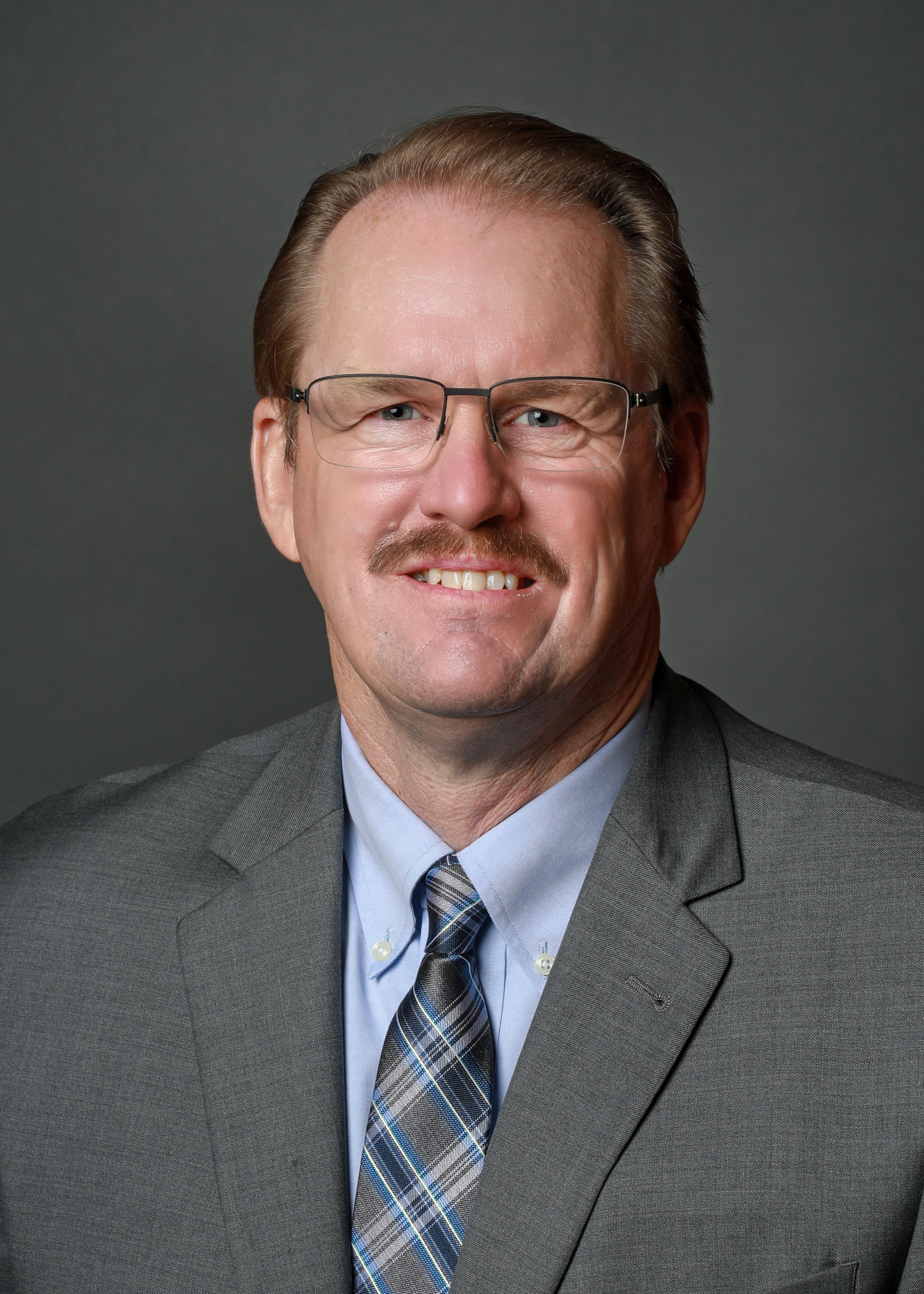

Member of the Iowa House of Representatives from the 51st district
- In office January 8, 2007 – January 13, 2025
- Preceded by: Jim Kurtenbach
- Succeeded by: Brett Barker

Personal details
- Born: December 14, 1960 (age 65) Manhattan, Kansas, U.S.
- Party: Republican
- Education: Iowa State University
- Occupation: Farmer
- Website: legis.iowa.gov/...

Dave Deyoe (born December 14, 1960) is a former Iowa State Representative from the 51st District. He served in the Iowa House of Representatives from 2007 to 2025.

Deyoe served on several committees in the Iowa House – the Agriculture, Appropriations, Economic Growth, and the Environmental Protection committees. He also served as the chair of the Economic Development Appropriations budget subcommittee.

== Electoral history ==
*incumbent

Election	Political result	Candidate	Party	Votes	%
Iowa House of Representatives general elections, 2006; District 10; Turnout: 12,103	Republican gain from Democratic	Dave Deyoe	Republican	6,358	52.53%
Iowa House of Representatives general elections, 2006; District 10; Turnout: 12,103	Republican gain from Democratic	Susan Radke*	Democratic	5,678	46.91%
Iowa House of Representatives primary elections, 2008; District 10	Republican	Dave Deyoe*	Republican	unopposed	
Iowa House of Representatives general elections, 2008; District 10; Turnout: 16,241	Republican hold	Dave Deyoe*	Republican	9,240	56.89%
Iowa House of Representatives general elections, 2008; District 10; Turnout: 16,241	Republican hold	Susan Radke	Democratic	6,310	38.85%
Iowa House of Representatives primary elections, 2010; District 10	Republican	Dave Deyoe*	Republican	unopposed	
Iowa House of Representatives general elections, 2010; District 10; Turnout: 13,104	Republican hold	Dave Deyoe*	Republican	7,803	59.55%
Iowa House of Representatives general elections, 2010; District 10; Turnout: 13,104	Republican hold	Selden Spencer	Democratic	4,734	36.13%
Iowa House of Representatives primary elections, 2012; District 49	Republican	Dave Deyoe*	Republican	unopposed	
Iowa House of Representatives general elections, 2012; District 49; Turnout: 16,305	Republican (newly redistricted)	Dave Deyoe*	Republican	9,192	56.38%
Iowa House of Representatives general elections, 2012; District 49; Turnout: 16,305	Republican (newly redistricted)	Kevin Ericson	Democratic	6,171	37.85%

Iowa House of Representatives
Preceded by Jim Kurtenbach	10th District; 2007–2013	Succeeded by Tom Shaw
Preceded by Helen Miller	49th District; 2013–2023	Succeeded by Beth Wessel-Kroeschell
Preceded by Jane Bloomingdale	51st District; 2023–2025	Succeeded by Brett Barker
