= Perkins, Iowa =

- Unincorporated community
- Location within Iowa Location within the United States
- Coordinates: 43°11′17″N 96°11′08″W
- Country: United States
- State: Iowa
- County: Sioux
- Elevation: 1,463 ft (446 m)
- Time zone: UTC-6 (Central (CST))
  - Summer (DST): UTC-5 (CDT)
- Area code: 712
- GNIS feature ID: 460083

Perkins is an unincorporated community in Sioux County, Iowa, United States. At Perkins, U.S. Route 18 and U.S. Route 75 are concurrent roadways.

== History ==
Perkins' population was 70 in 1925. The population was 79 in 1940.
