= Richard W. Welden =

American politician (1908–1992)

Richard W. Welden (July 11, 1908 – June 12, 1992) was an American politician.

Richard Welden was born to parents William E. Welden and Bess Wilkinson in Iowa Falls, Iowa, on July 11, 1908. After attending schools in the Iowa Falls Community School District, and graduating in 1925, Richard Welden enrolled at Ellsworth Community College, then transferred to Iowa State University, where he completed a bachelor's degree in 1931. In the midst of World War II, Welden helped build the Alaskan Highway, and during his career in civil engineering, served as president of the Associated General Contractors of Iowa. Both AGC–Iowa and the American Society of Civil Engineers elevated Welden to life member status.

Welden was a Methodist and held membership in Rotary International, the Benevolent and Protective Order of Elks, the Farm Bureau, and served on the advisory board of two banks. He was president of both the Iowa Falls School Board and the Iowa Falls Planning Commission before winning his first Iowa House of Representatives election in 1966 as a Republican. Welden held the District 64 seat for two terms until 1971, was elected to one two-year term in District 32, then served five consecutive terms for District 10 until 1983. Welden remained a state representative until 1987, winning two terms in District 18.

Welden died at home in Iowa Falls on June 12, 1992, at the age of 83.
