= Metropolitan Community College (Nebraska) =

Public college in Omaha, Nebraska, US

Coordinates: 41°18′28″N 95°57′32″W

- Other name: MCC
- Former name: Metropolitan Technical Community College
- Type: Public community college
- Academic affiliations: Space-grant
- Location: Omaha, Nebraska, United States
- Website: mccneb.edu
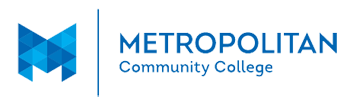

Metropolitan Community College (Metro or MCC) is a public community college based in Omaha, Nebraska. It has multiple campuses throughout the Omaha–Council Bluffs metropolitan area. MCC serves residents of Dodge, Douglas, Sarpy and Washington Counties. Accredited by the Higher Learning Commission, MCC is the largest post-secondary institution in Nebraska.

== History ==
Metropolitan Community College was announced in 1970 along with seven other state-funded technical colleges that would serve the Nebraska area. The colleges were all part of a bill proposed by the Nebraska State Legislature that passed later that year. Established in 1971 as the Omaha Technical Community College. In 1974, the Eastern and Omaha technical colleges were consolidated into one, forming the current metropolitan college, rebranded to Metropolitan Technical Community College.

In 1983, the community college was given authorization from the State Legislature to offer general education courses and vocational programs. In 1985, it was announced that the college would rebrand to Metropolitan Community College.

In July 2013, Metropolitan Community College announced that it would be rebranding to Metro Community College. Additionally the college introduced its current logo. In 2015, Metro began a partnership with Do Space. In 2016, the Fort Omaha campus underwent major expansion and re-opened in the next year.

== Academics ==
Undergraduate demographics as of 2025
Race and ethnicity	Total
White	47%
Hispanic	19%
Asian	3%
Two or more races	5%
Black	12%
International student	1%
Unknown	12%
Economic diversity
Low-income (Note: The percentage of students who received an income-based federal Pell grant intended for low-income students.)	40%
Affluent (Note: The percentage of students who are a part of the American middle class at the bare minimum.)	60%

Metropolitan Community College is a state-funded community college. As of 2025, Metro currently has 7,600 students enrolled. Metro currently includes 87 fields of study. The largest include Liberal Arts and Sciences, Vehicle Maintenance, Computer and Information Sciences, Business Administration, and Design and Applied Arts.

== Campuses ==
Metropolitan Community College has campuses throughout the Omaha–Council Bluffs metropolitan area. These include in North and South Omaha, Elkhorn, Fremont, and La Vista. The college also has an under construction campus in Papillion.

== Notable alumni ==
- Tom W. Shaw, member of the Iowa House of Representatives

== Governance ==
The college is governed by an 11-member board of governors. The members represent five districts with one member at large. Members serve four-year terms.

== See also ==
- Education in North Omaha, Nebraska
- Do Space
