= John W. Beard =

American politician (born 1951)

John Beard
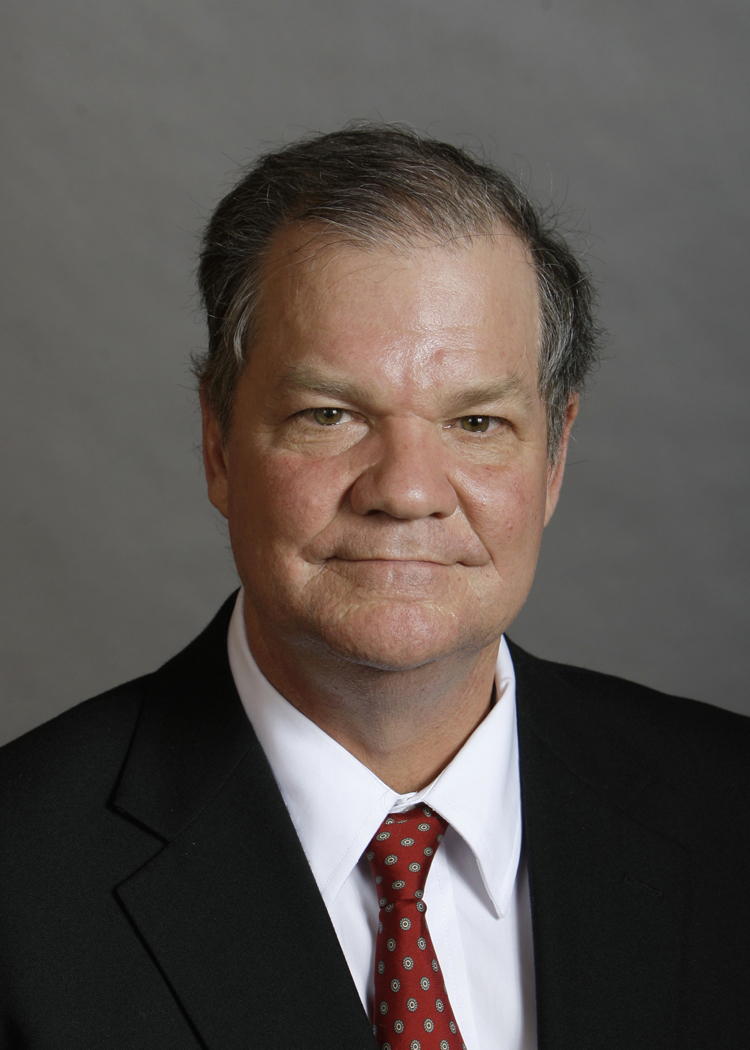

Member of the Iowa House of Representatives from the 16th district
- In office 2008–2010

Personal details
- Born: November 4, 1951 (age 74) Decorah, Iowa
- Party: Democratic
- Spouse: Rojene

John W. Beard (born November 4, 1951, in Decorah, Iowa) is a Democratic politician, representing the 16th District in the Iowa House of Representatives since 2008. Beard lost his campaign for re-election to Bob Hager in 2010. Beard is currently the Democratic candidate for Senate District 28, which after redistricting, included part of the old House District 16. The Senate seat does not have an incumbent.

== Early life and education ==
Beard was raised in Bedminster, New Jersey. He attended Rutgers University and the University of Miami.

== Career ==
Along with being a politician, Beard is also the owner and operator of Beard Welding and Machine.

== Organizations ==
He is a member in the following organizations:

- Winneshiek County Conservation Board
- Trout Unlimited
- Pheasants Forever

== Family ==
Beard is married to his wife RoJene and together they have two sons, a daughter, and two grandchildren.
