= Omaha Public Library (building) =

Historic library in Omaha, Nebraska, U.S.

- U.S. National Register of Historic Places
- Omaha Landmark
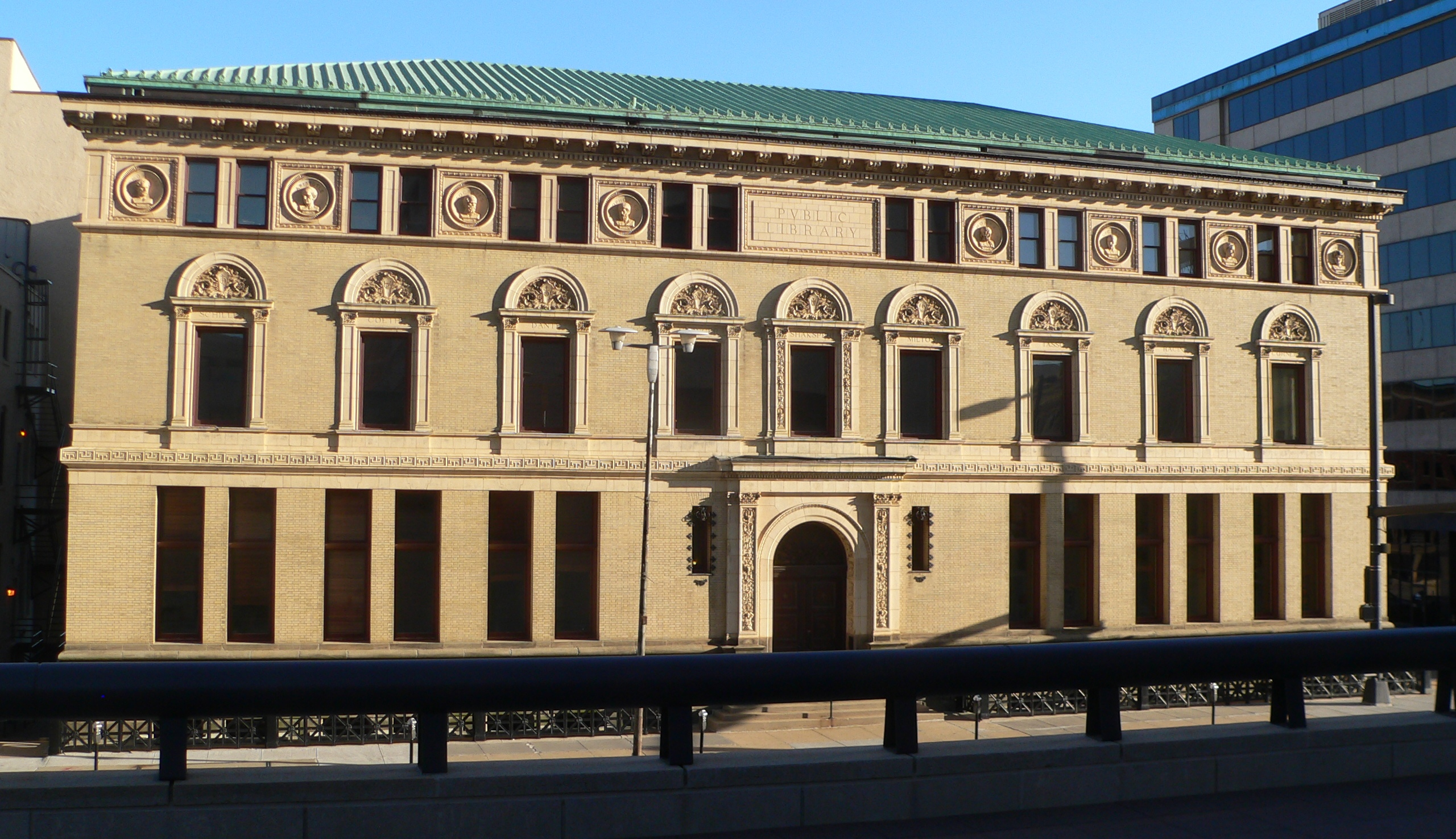
- Omaha Public Library in 2013
- Location: 1823 Harney Street, Omaha, Nebraska, U.S.
- Coordinates: 41.2563179836581°N 95.94063698423916°W
- Built: 1891–1894
- Architect: Thomas Rogers Kimball
- Architectural style: Second Renaissance Revival
- NRHP reference No.: 78001696

Significant dates
- Added to NRHP: October 17, 1978
- Designated OMAL: September 21, 1978

The original Omaha Public Library building is an office building and former library located at 1823 Harney Street in Downtown Omaha, Nebraska, United States. Renowned architect and future Nebraska Hall of Fame inductee Thomas Rogers Kimball designed it in the Second Renaissance Revival style. The building served as the main branch of the Omaha Public Library from 1894 until the completion of the W. Dale Clark Library in 1977. The building was designated an Omaha Landmark in October 1978, and was listed on the National Register of Historic Places that same year.

== History ==
The original Omaha Public Library building was built in the early 1890s and opened in 1894. The building was designed by Thomas Kimball, and was used as the main branch of the Omaha Public Library until 1977. Similar to the Boston Public Library, the original Omaha Public Library building is the best early Second Renaissance Revival structure in Nebraska. Byron Reed, a pioneer real estate broker in Omaha, donated the site for the building and his collection of books, manuscripts and coins.

In 1975, following years of disrepair, it was announced that the building would be replaced with the W. Dale Clark Library. The library closed on February 16, 1977. The W. Dale Clark Library opened in March of that same year. It was subsequently renovated as an office building called the "Omaha Library Plaza". The Omaha Public Library building was listed on the National Register of Historic Places in 1978. That same year, it was also listed as an Omaha Landmark.

== Architecture ==
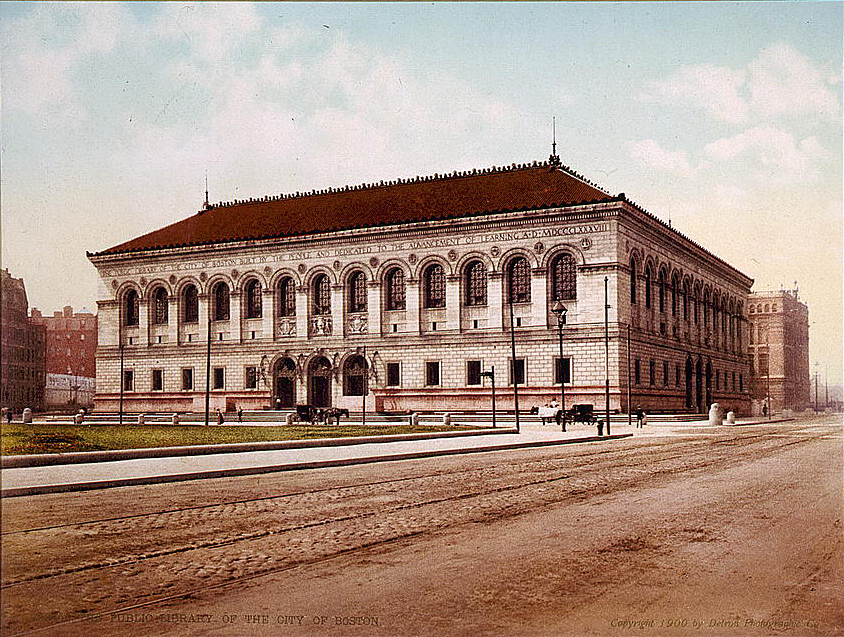
The Boston Central Library, which the original Omaha Public Library takes inspiration from

Renowned architect and future Nebraska Hall of Fame inductee Thomas Rogers Kimball designed it in the Second Renaissance Revival style. It was officially listed on the National Register of Historic Places on September 21, 1978. It was designated an Omaha Landmark in October 17, 1978.

== See also ==
- History of Omaha
- Omaha Public Library
