= Omaha Public Library =

Public library system in Omaha, Nebraska, U.S.

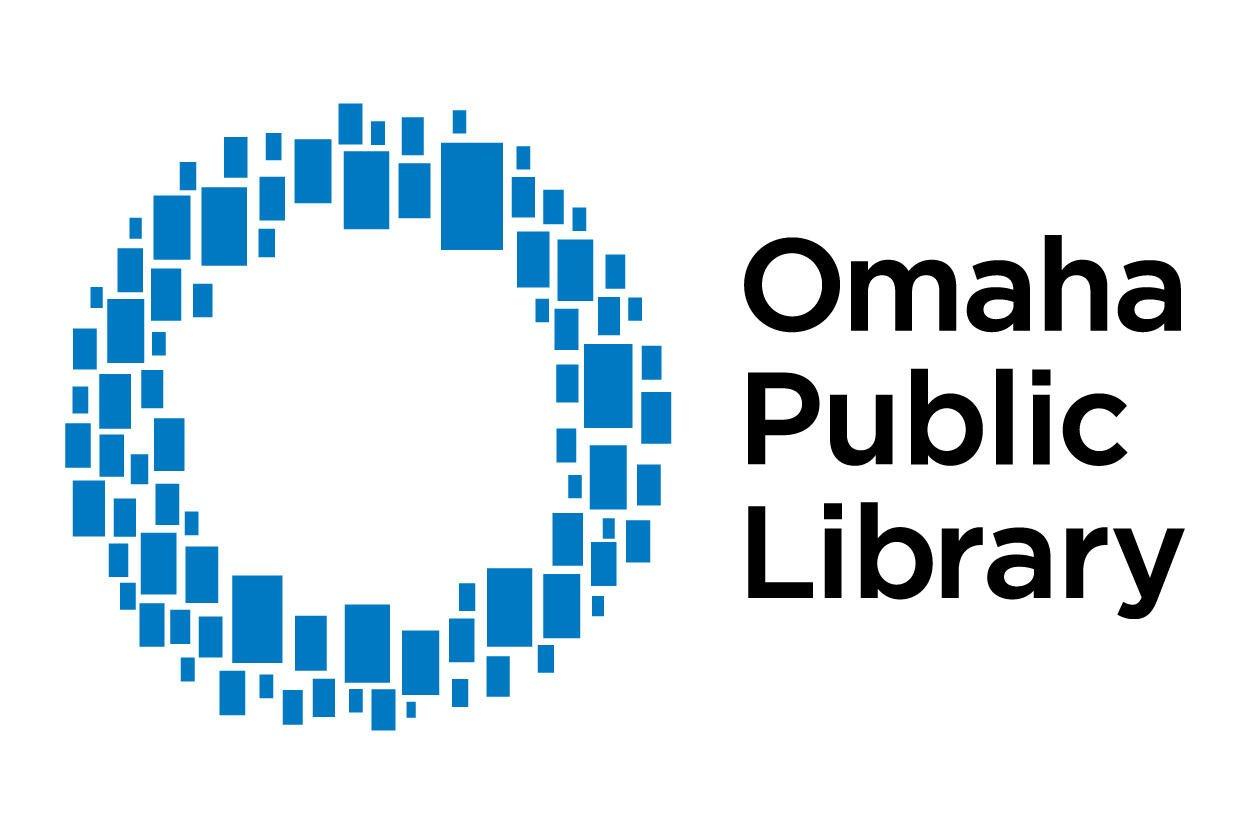

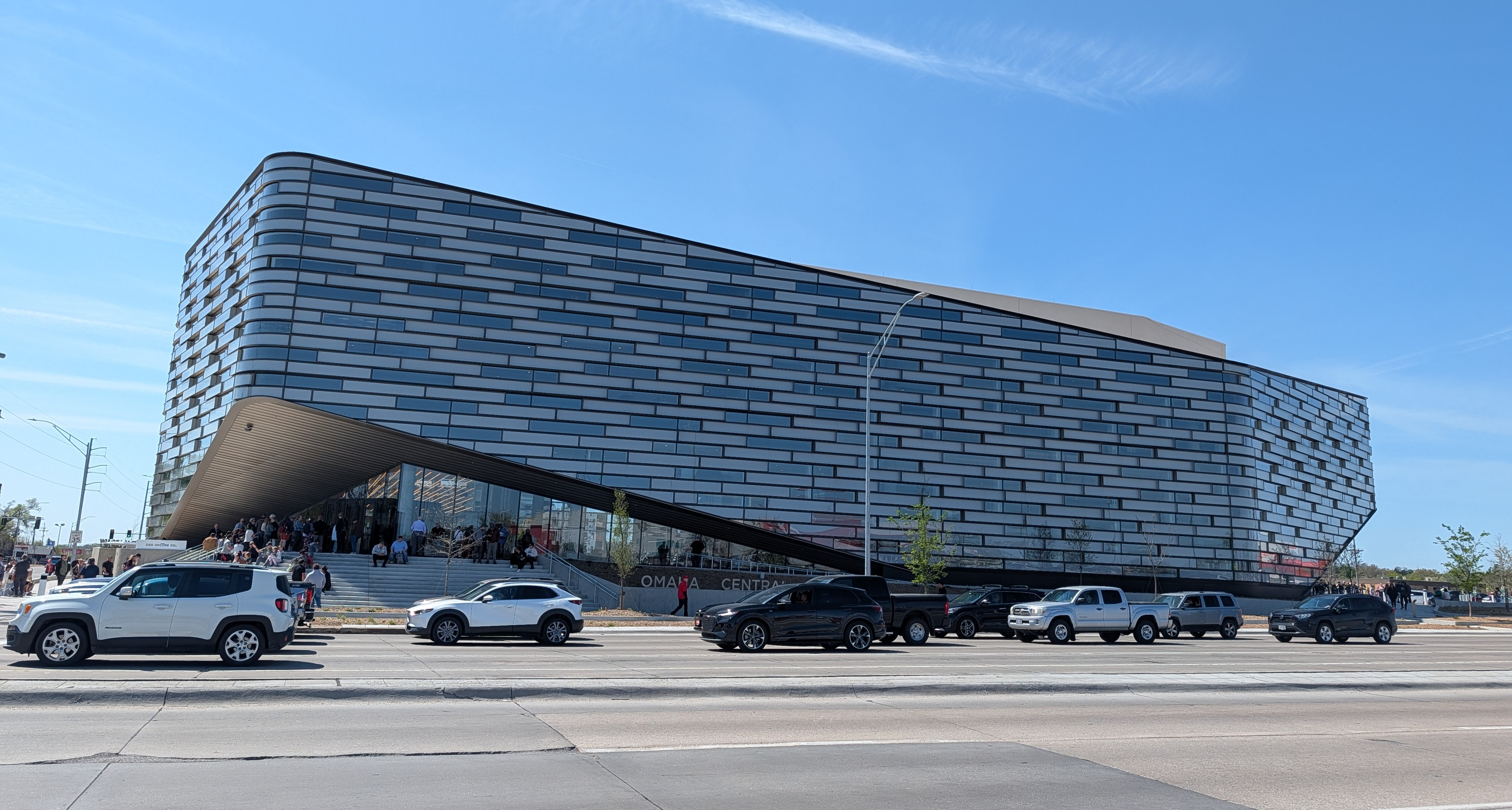
- Omaha Public Library's main library, Omaha Central Library
- Location: Omaha, Nebraska, U.S.
- Established: 1872
- Branches: 13

Collection
- Size: 1,309,087

Access and use
- Population served: 277,239 register users

Other information
- Budget: $16,211,822
- Website: omahalibrary.org

Omaha Public Library is the public library system of the city of Omaha, Nebraska, United States. The system was founded in 1872, but was not city owned and did not have a library board until 1877. There are 13 libraries in the system.

== History ==
The original Omaha Public Library opened in 1872 in the second floor of the Simpson Carriage factory at 14th & Dodge Street. Before 1877, the library was owned by the Omaha Library Association. However, in 1877, the Omaha City Council appointed a library board, which levied a tax to create Omaha Public Library. They immediately accepted 4,500 books from the disbanded association as a gift.

Real estate tycoon Byron Reed donated land and his vast collection of coins, books and manuscripts to the library in the early 1890s, and in 1894, Omaha Public Library opened in its first permanent home at 18th and Harney. A year later, Omaha Public Library became one of the first six public libraries in the nation to create a separate children's section. In 1977, the library system moved its central location to the W. Dale Clark Library.

The W. Dale Clark Library was demolished in 2022. Following its demolition, the library announced plans to move its central location to Central Omaha with the new Omaha Central Public Library, which was completed in November 2025 and opened in April 2026.

== Governance ==
The Omaha Public Library is governed by a nine-member board of trustees. These people are appointed by the mayor of Omaha and confirmed by the Omaha City Council. Terms are for three years. The Board of Trustees meet every third Thursday of each month at 5 PM at different branches throughout the system. Meetings are open to the public and the agenda and minutes are posted on the Omaha Public Library website.

== Branches ==
Omaha Public Library includes 13 locations. Of the 13 libraries in the system, the W. Dale Clark Library housed the largest collection.

== Notable Partnerships ==
=== The Henry Doorly Zoo and Aquarium ===
In May 2017, the Omaha Public Library announced a partnership with the Henry Doorly Zoo and Aquarium. The zoo donated tickets to the library for the purpose of offering them free of charge to library members. A limited number of tickets are delivered to OPL branches for distribution four times a year. Each library branch then offers these one-time visit tickets to interested library members which allows them and three of their family members to visit the zoo for free.

=== Fontenelle Forest ===
In April 2018, the Omaha Public Library announced a partnership with Fontenelle Forest. Each of OPL's 13 branches would have seven free forest admission passes available for check-out year-round. Passes are good for one-time admission on the day of the week designated on the pass, and each pass admits two adults and children from their household.

=== The Omaha Children's Museum ===
In August 2018, the Omaha Public Library announced a partnership with the Omaha Children's Museum. Free children's museum tickets would be made available four times a year for distribution to library members. Each free one-time visit ticket is good for up to four family members.

=== The Lauritzen Gardens ===
In December 2018, the Omaha Public Library announced a partnership with Lauritzen Gardens. Free garden admission passes, one per branch location, would be made available to library members for checkout year-round. The passes are good for a one-time admission of two adults and any children from their household.

=== The Durham Museum ===
In January 2021, the Durham Museum announced a partnership with the Omaha Public Library. Free museum admission passes, one per branch location, would be made available to library members for checkout year-round. The passes are good for one-time admission of two adults and dependent children or grandchildren from their household.

=== Heartland B-cycle ===
The Omaha Public Library has a partnership with Heartland B-cycle. B-cycle provides passes for library members to rent bicycles for free through their bike sharing terminals. B-cycle passes are good for five days and allow OPL members who are 18 and up to check out a bike free of charge. Each OPL branch has four passes available for checkout.

== Website and services ==
=== AskOPL ===
Omaha Public Library offers research and reference help through the ASKOPL service. Users can call, email, text, or use online chat to get help from an OPL librarian to answer their question.

=== Common Soil Seed Library ===
In 2013, The Omaha Public Library created The Common Soil Seed Library to help encourage a culture of abundance and food literacy, promote urban agriculture, and help diversify open-pollinated plants and seed at the local level. The Common Soil Seed Library is a collection of open-pollinated and heirloom seeds that you can borrow to plant and grow at home. The seed collection depends on donations and seasonality.

=== Resource Center ===
Over 100 online resources from eBooks, full-text journals, tutorials and databases are available to OPL members through the Omaha Public Library's Resource Center website.

=== The Book Drop podcast ===
The Book Drop is a weekly podcast produced by OPL staff that explores topics related to the Omaha community, libraries and the joy of reading. OPL staff offer reading suggestions, chat with guests and delve into books, resources and pop culture.

=== Book Clubs ===
Omaha Public Library offers a variety of book club resources to help start a book club or find a book club to join. Omaha Public Library has hundreds of book club bags to choose from for adults, young adults and children. Each book club bag includes the following: canvas carrying bag, 7–12 copies of the book, and a notebook with discussion questions, author information and other materials.

=== The Well-Read Collective ===
The Well-Read Collective is a team of Omaha Public Library staff members who love books and want to talk about what people are reading. The Well-Read Collective goal is to help the public find their next favorite read, explore new genres and talk about new and forthcoming titles. Members of the public can request a custom reading list, invite the collective to their next book club meeting or community event or connect with them at their local OPL branch.

=== Genealogy & Local History Room ===
The Genealogy & Local History Room is currently located at 3020 S. 84th Street, the former location of the Shopko department store. The Genealogy & Local History Room houses a non-circulating collection of more than 27,000 items (not counting a large collection of local records and newspapers on microfilm), including an extensive collection of Nebraska resources, most standard genealogy reference works, and a large collection of family genealogies organized by surname. Family research enthusiasts will also find vital records indices, cemetery indices and transcriptions, census indices, county and town histories, and plat books, atlases, and gazetteers. The public can request help with local history and genealogy research by filling out a research request form.

== Friends of Omaha Public Library (FOPL) ==
Friends of the Omaha Public Library

The Friends of Omaha Public Library (FOPL) is a non-profit, volunteer-run organization which helps to fund literacy and community outreach programs for Omaha Public Library and the Omaha community. FOPL raises money through membership support and sales of used books. General book sales are held quarterly at the W. Clarke Swanson Branch. The Friends of Omaha Public Library can also be found online on AbeBooks as the Omaha Library Friends and on eBay as the Friends of the Omaha Public Library.

== See also ==
- History of Omaha
