= Gene Manternach =

American politician (born 1953)

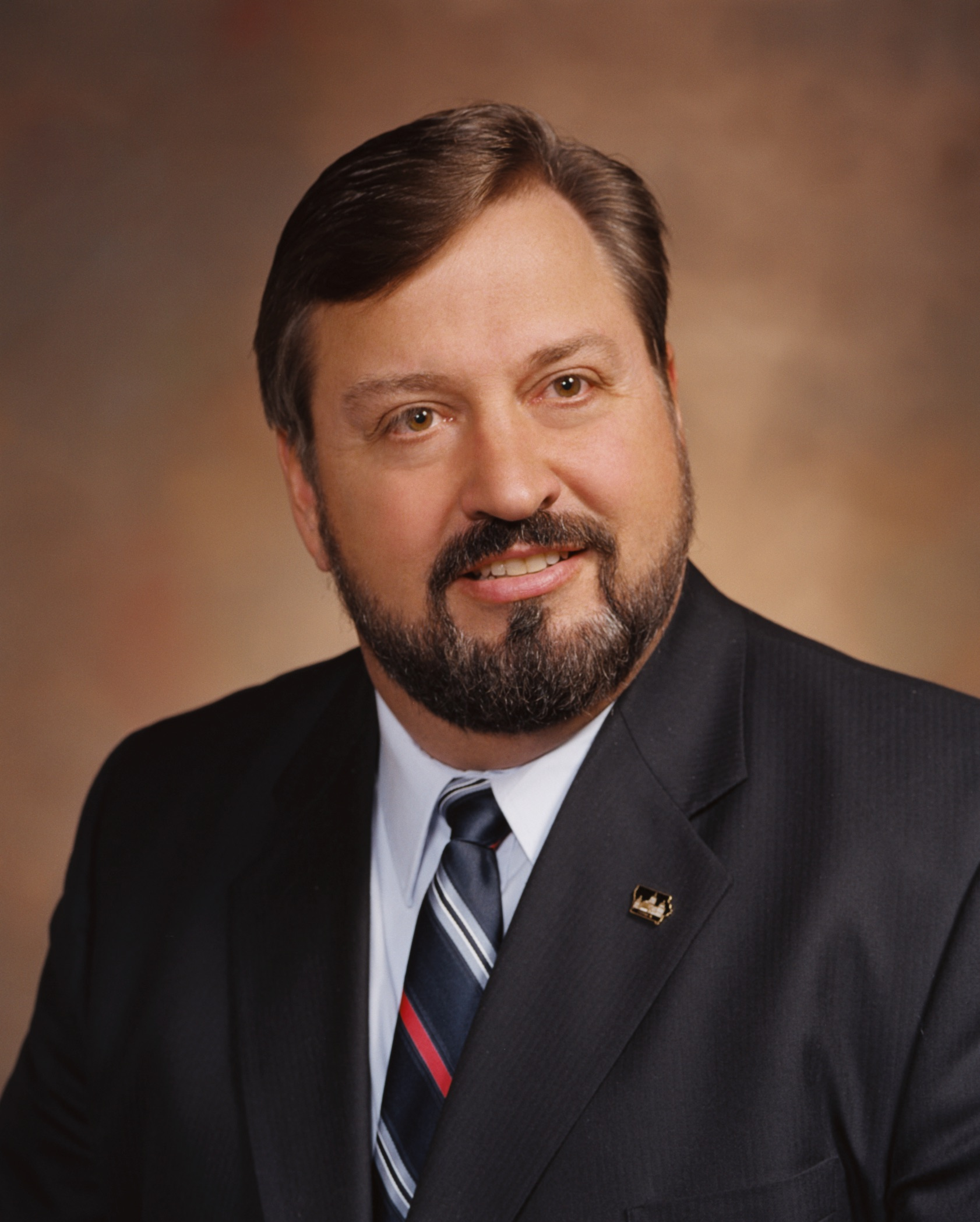

Member of the Iowa House of Representatives
- In office January 8, 2001 – January 9, 2005

Personal details
- Born: December 3, 1953 (age 72) Monticello, Iowa, United States
- Party: Republican
- Spouse: Aimee
- Children: four
- Occupation: farmer

Gene Manternach (born December 3, 1953) is an American politician in the state of Iowa.

Manternach was born in Monticello, Iowa. He attended Iowa State University and Northeast Iowa Community College and is a farmer. A Republican, he served in the Iowa House of Representatives from 2001 to 2005 (31st district from 2003 to 2005 and 56th district from 2001 to 2003).
