= Russell Eddie =

American politician (born 1938)

Russell J. Eddie
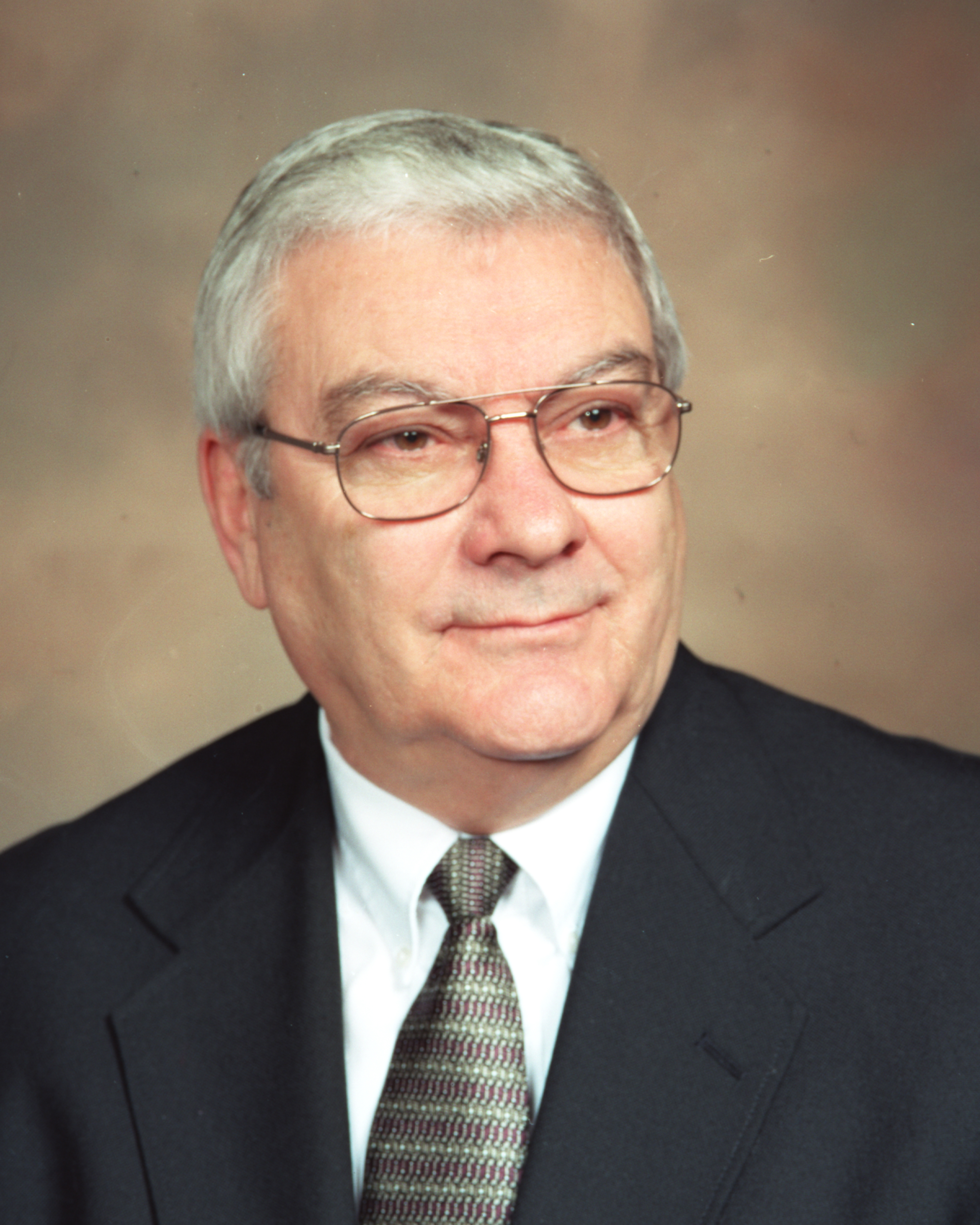

Member of the Iowa House of Representatives
- In office January 12, 1987 – January 12, 2003

Personal details
- Born: June 9, 1938 (age 88) Wayne, Nebraska, United States
- Party: Republican
- Spouse: Gladys Pedersen
- Children: four
- Occupation: farmer

Russell J. Eddie (born June 9, 1938) was an American politician in the state of Iowa.

Eddie was born in Wayne, Nebraska. He attended Buena Vista College and was a farmer. He served in the Iowa House of Representatives from 1987 to 2003, as a Republican.
