= Iowa's 74th House of Representatives district =

American legislative district

House District 74
- Type: District of the Lower house
- Location: Iowa
- Representative: Eric Gjerde
- Parent organization: Iowa General Assembly

The 74th District of the Iowa House of Representatives in the state of Iowa is part of Linn County.

== Current elected officials ==
Eric Gjerde is the representative currently representing the district.

== Past representatives ==
The district has previously been represented by:

- Charles H. Pelton, 1971–1973
- William J. Hargrave, 1973–1979
- Dale W. Hibbs, 1979–1981
- Minnette Doderer, 1981–1983
- Johnie Hammond, 1983–1993
- Dorothy Carpenter, 1993–1995
- Libby Jacobs, 1995–2003
- Mark Davitt, 2003–2009
- Kent Sorenson, 2009–2011
- Glen Massie, 2011–2013
- David Jacoby, 2013–2023
- Eric Gjerde, 2023–Present
