= Iowa's 62nd House of Representatives district =

American legislative district

House District 62
- Type: District of the Lower house
- Location: Iowa
- Representative: Jerome Amos Jr.
- Parent organization: Iowa General Assembly

The 62nd District of the Iowa House of Representatives in the state of Iowa. It is currently composed of part of Black Hawk County.

== Current elected officials ==
Jerome Amos Jr. is the representative currently representing the district.

== Past representatives ==
The district has previously been represented by:

- Philip B. Hill, 1971–1973
- Norman G. Jesse, 1973–1981
- Jo Ann Trucano, 1981–1983
- William R. Sullivan, 1983–1987
- Philip Wise, 1987–1993
- William Bernau, 1993–1999
- Dennis Parmenter, 1999–2001
- Barbara Finch, 2001–2003
- Frank Chiodo, 2003–2005
- Bruce Hunter, 2003–2013
- Deborah Berry, 2013–2017
- Ras Smith, 2017–2023
