= David Jacoby (politician) =

American politician

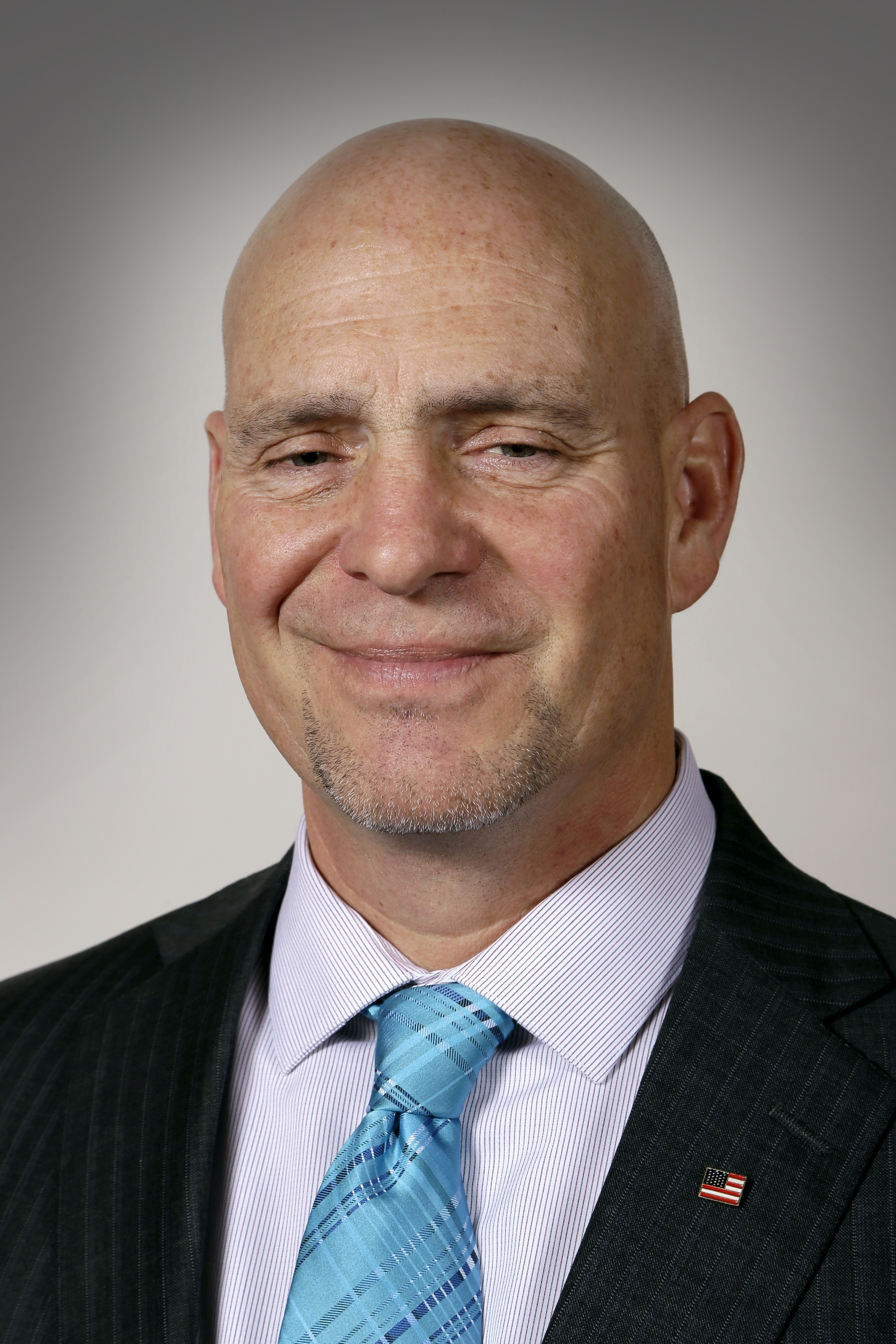

Member of the Iowa House of Representatives
- Incumbent
- Assumed office October 14, 2003
- Preceded by: Mary Mascher
- Constituency: 86th district (2023–Present); 74th district (2013–2023); 30th district (2003–2013)

Personal details
- Born: 1956 (age 69–70) Cedar Rapids, Iowa, U.S.
- Party: Democratic
- Spouse: Lynette
- Children: Ellie, Anna
- Education: University of Northern Iowa
- Occupation: Small Business Owner, Dave's Resale
- Website: Jacoby's website

David Jacoby (born 1956) is the Iowa State Representative from the 86th District. A Democrat, he has served in the Iowa House of Representatives since 2003, when he was elected in a special election following the resignation of Richard E. Myers.

Jacoby currently serves on several committees in the Iowa House – the Appropriations committee; the Human Resources committee; the State Government committee; and the Commerce committee, where he is chair.

Jacoby was reelected in 2006 with 9,639 votes, running unopposed.

== Early life and education ==
Jacoby was born and raised in Marion, Iowa. He graduated from Marion High School and later obtained his B.A. from the University of Northern Iowa.

== Family ==
Jacoby is the son of George and Millie Jacoby. He is married to his wife Lynette and together they have two daughters, Ellie and Anna.

== Career ==
Outside politics Jacoby is a small business owner. His business, Dave's Resale, works in estate sales.

== Organizations ==
Jacoby is a member of the following organizations:

- Carpenter's Local 1260
- Iowa City Area Chamber of Commerce
- Youth Leadership Program Board
- Alternative School Committee
- Empowerment Board
- Juvenile Justice Committee
- St Thomas More Catholic Church

Iowa House of Representatives
Preceded by Mary Mascher	86th District; 2023 – present	Succeeded by Incumbent
Preceded by Glen Massie	74th District; 2013 – 2023	Succeeded by Eric Gjerde
Preceded by Richard E. Myers	30th District; 2003 – 2013	Succeeded by Joe Riding
