= Iowa's 67th House of Representatives district =

American legislative district

House District 67
- Type: District of the Lower house
- Location: Iowa
- Representative: Craig Johnson
- Parent organization: Iowa General Assembly

The 67th District of the Iowa House of Representatives in the state of Iowa. It is currently composed of Delaware County, as well as part of Buchanan and Dubuque counties.

== Current elected officials ==
Craig Johnson is the representative currently representing the district.

== Past representatives ==
The district has previously been represented by:

- Norman Roorda, 1971–1973
- James T. Caffrey, 1973–1977
- Ned Chiodo, 1977–1983
- James J. Cooper, 1983–1989
- Joel W. Brown, 1989–1993
- Matt McCoy, 1993–1997
- Frank Chiodo, 1997–2003
- Kevin McCarthy, 2003–2013
- Kraig Paulsen, 2013–2017
- Ashley Hinson, 2017–2021
- Eric Gjerde, 2021–2023
- Craig Johnson, 2023–Present
