= Trucano =

Trucano is a surname. Notable people with a surname include:

- Jo Ann Trucano (born 1943), American politician in Iowa
- Victorina Trucano (1839–?), Italian hatmaker and anarchist
