= Frank Chiodo =

American politician (born 1968)

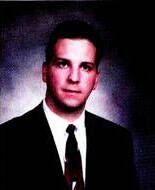

Member of the Iowa House of Representatives from the 62nd district
- In office January 13, 2003 – January 14, 2003
- Preceded by: Barbara Finch
- Succeeded by: Bruce Hunter

Member of the Iowa House of Representatives from the 67th district
- In office January 13, 1997 – January 12, 2003
- Preceded by: Matt McCoy
- Succeeded by: Kevin McCarthy

Personal details
- Born: May 8, 1968 (age 58) Des Moines, Iowa, U.S.
- Party: Democratic
- Spouse: Lisa
- Children: 3
- Parent: Ned Chiodo
- Occupation: Businessman

Frank J. Chiodo (born May 8, 1968) is an American politician in the state of Iowa.

Chiodo was born in Des Moines, Iowa. He attended Grandview College and is a businessman. A Democrat, he served in the Iowa House of Representatives from 1997 to 2005 (67th district). His father, Ned Chiodo was also an Iowa State Representative.
