= Eric Gjerde =

American politician and educator

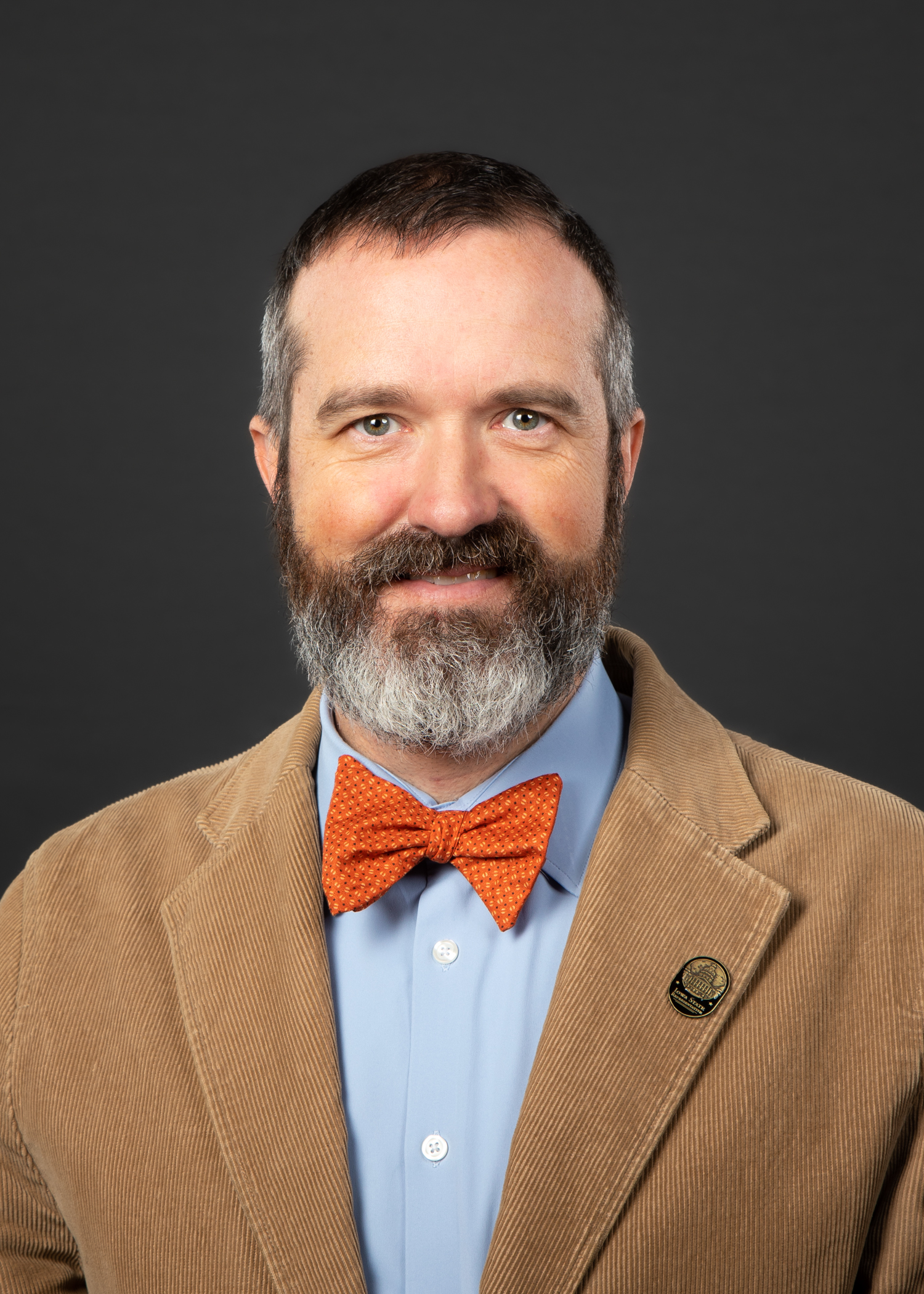
- Official portrait, 2023

Member of the Iowa House of Representatives
- Incumbent
- Assumed office January 11, 2021
- Preceded by: Ashley Hinson
- Constituency: 74th district (2023–Present); 67th district (2021–2023)

Personal details
- Party: Democratic
- Children: 3
- Education: Augustana College (BA); University of Iowa (MEd, MEd); University of Northern Iowa (EdD)

Eric Gjerde is an American politician and police officer who is a member of the Iowa House of Representatives from the 74th district. Elected in 2020, he assumed office on January 11, 2021.

== Early life and education ==
Gjerde earned a Bachelor of Arts degree in sociology and religion from Augustana College, a Master of Education in secondary education and another in educational administration from the University of Iowa, and a Doctor of Education from the University of Northern Iowa.

== Career ==
After earning his first master's degree, Gjerde worked as a teacher and emergency medical technician in Le Roy, Minnesota. While studying for his doctorate in education, he worked as a special education teacher at Clear Creek Amana High School. He has since worked as a special education teacher and coach in the Cedar Rapids Community School District. Gjerde was a volunteer deputy with the Linn County, Iowa Sheriff's Office. He is currently a police officer for the City of Cedar Rapids.

In 2018, Gjerde was the Democratic nominee for district 67 in the Iowa House of Representatives, losing to Ashley Hinson. After Hinson announced that she would not seek re-election to the Iowa House and instead run for the United States House of Representatives, Gjerde declared his candidacy to succeed her. He did not face an opponent in the Democratic primary and defeated Republican nominee Sally Ann Abbott in the general election.

=== 2025-2027 committee assignments ===
- Public Safety (ranking member)
- Ethics
- Government Oversight
- Natural Resources
- Ways and Means

== Personal life ==
Gjerde was born in 1978 in Spicer, Minnesota. He and his ex-wife, Amy, have three daughters. He resides in Cedar Rapids.

Iowa House of Representatives
Preceded by David Jacoby	74th District; 2023 – present	Succeeded by Incumbent
Preceded by Ashley Hinson	67th District; 2021 – 2023	Succeeded by Craig Johnson
