= Richard E. Myers =

American politician (1934–2026)

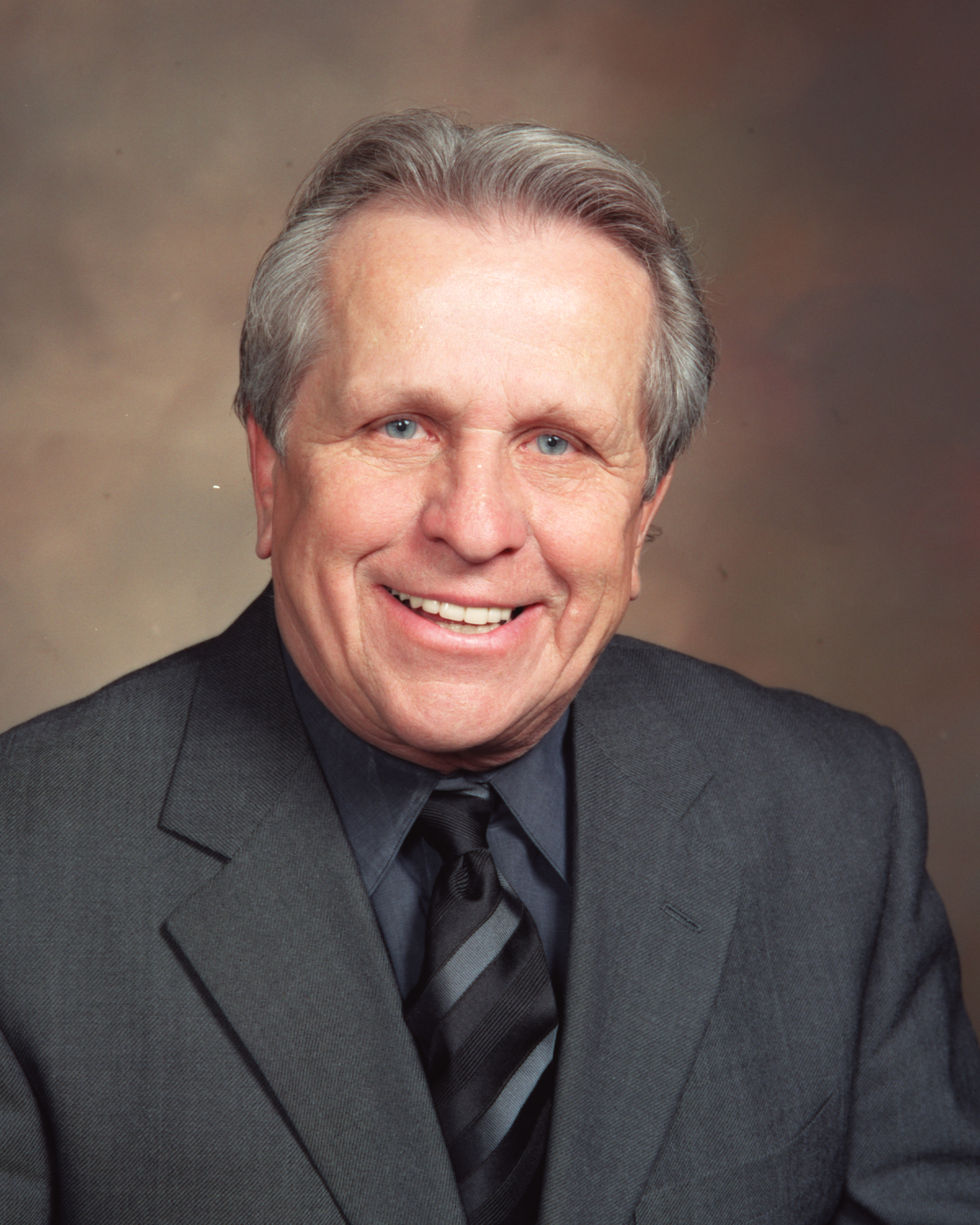

Member of the Iowa House of Representatives from the 30th district
- In office January 13, 2003 – August 25, 2003
- Preceded by: Brian Quirk
- Succeeded by: David Jacoby

Member of the Iowa House of Representatives from the 49th district
- In office February 22, 1994 – January 12, 2003
- Preceded by: Robert Dvorsky
- Succeeded by: Helen Miller

Mayor of Coralville, Iowa
- In office 1969–1978

Personal details
- Born: Richard Ellsworth Myers Jr. October 29, 1934 Iowa City, Iowa, U.S.
- Died: March 19, 2026 (aged 91)
- Party: Democratic
- Spouse: Doris
- Children: 4
- Occupation: Businessman

Richard Ellsworth Myers Jr. (October 29, 1934 – March 19, 2026) was an American politician in the state of Iowa.

== Life and career ==
Myers was born in Iowa City, Iowa, on October 29, 1934. He attended Iowa State University, the University of Iowa, and Kirkwood Community College and was a businessman. A Democrat, he served in the Iowa House of Representatives from 1994 to 2005 (49th district from 1994 to 2003 and 30th district in 2003). Myers was first elected to the state house in a February 1994 special election called after Robert Dvorsky resigned to contest a state senate seat. During the Democratic Party primaries later that year, Myers defeated David Johnson and won his first full term as a state representative. Myers died on March 19, 2026, at the age of 91.
