= Staci Appel =

American politician

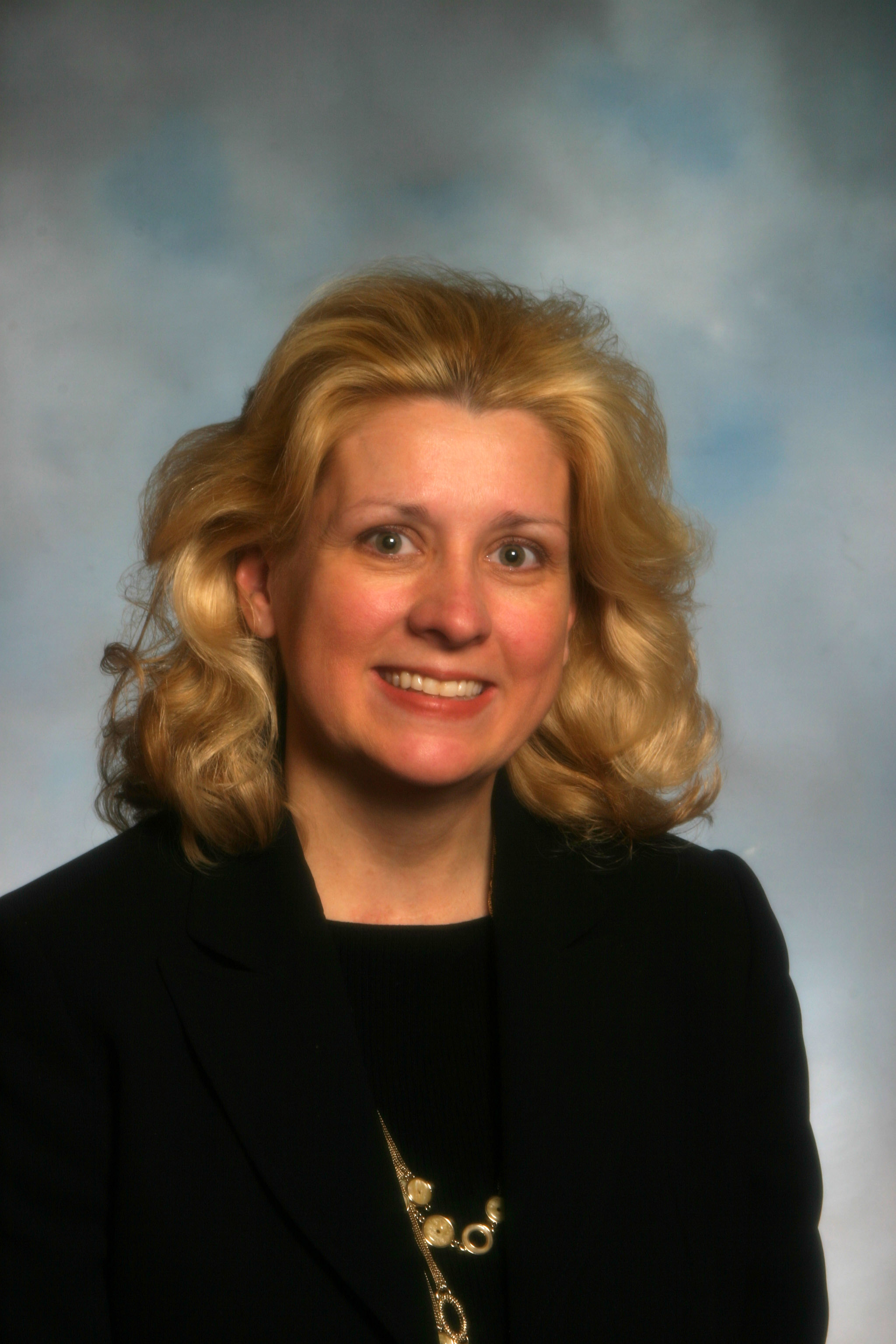

Member of the Iowa Senate from the 37th district
- In office January 8, 2007 – January 10, 2011
- Preceded by: Doug Shull
- Succeeded by: Kent Sorenson

Personal details
- Born: April 19, 1966 (age 60) Waterloo, Iowa, U.S.
- Party: Democratic
- Spouse: Brent R. Appel
- Children: 6

Staci Lynn Appel (born April 19, 1966) is an American politician from the U.S. state of Iowa. She served in the Iowa Senate as the assistant majority leader from 2007 to 2011, representing the 37th district. A Democrat, in 2014 she unsuccessfully ran for a seat in the United States House of Representatives for Iowa's 3rd congressional district.

== Early life ==
Appel was born in Waterloo, Iowa. She grew up in Iowa City, Iowa, and attended Iowa City West High School.

== Career ==
Appel worked for 12 years as a financial consultant with Merrill Lynch and UBS Paine Webber.

She served on several committees in the Iowa Senate: the Agriculture committee; the State Government committee; the Ways and Means committee; and the Education committee, where she was vice chair. She also served as vice chair of the Administration and Regulation Appropriations Subcommittee.

Appel was elected in 2006 with 12,827 votes (50%), defeating Republican opponent Julian B. Garrett by 772 votes.

Appel's first bill in the Senate was a proposal to raise the minimum wage in Iowa to $7.25. During her time in the state senate, she favored the Equal Pay For Equal Work Act.

As a member of the Iowa Senate, Appel was appointed assistant majority leader.

She lost her bid for reelection to state Representative Kent Sorenson in 2010, 58% to 40%.

=== Political positions ===
Appel is pro-choice and supports same-sex marriage. She has stated her support for the Affordable Care Act and would not repeal it. She endorsed Senator Tom Harkin's proposal to raise the minimum wage to $10.10 per hour. On immigration, she has stated her support for increased border security and a pathway for citizenship for the estimated 11 million undocumented immigrants currently in the United States. On gun rights, Appel has stated that the gun-show loophole should be closed and that background checks should be required wherever a gun is purchased. On foreign policy, she has stated her opposition to Russia's incursions into Ukraine, though noted that "she said she doesn't hear Iowans talking much about foreign policy."

=== 2014 congressional election ===
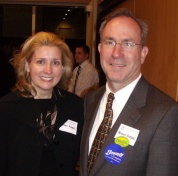
Appel and her husband, Brent R. Appel

Appel ran for an open congressional seat in Iowa's 3rd congressional district. Incumbent congressman Tom Latham retired. She initially stated she would run for the seat, before announcing that she would not run, citing family obligations, then reversing her decision again to commit to the race. She faced Republican nominee David Young in the general election. Young won the election with 52.8% of the vote to Appel's 42.2%.

Appel was endorsed by EMILY's List, a political action committee that supports pro-choice female Democrats, and the American Federation of State, County and Municipal Employees. The Democratic Congressional Campaign Committee added her to their jumpstart program, which provides financial support. Stuart Rothenberg of Roll Call rated the race a "Pure Toss Up".

In May 2014, a Republican spokesperson accused Appel of plagiarizing text from another candidate's website, which her campaign manager took responsibility for.

== Personal life ==
Appel's husband, Brent R. Appel, served on the Iowa Supreme Court. They live with their six children in Ackworth, Iowa.

Iowa Senate
Preceded by Doug Shull	37th District; 2007–2011	Succeeded by Kent Sorenson
