= Ras Smith =

American politician

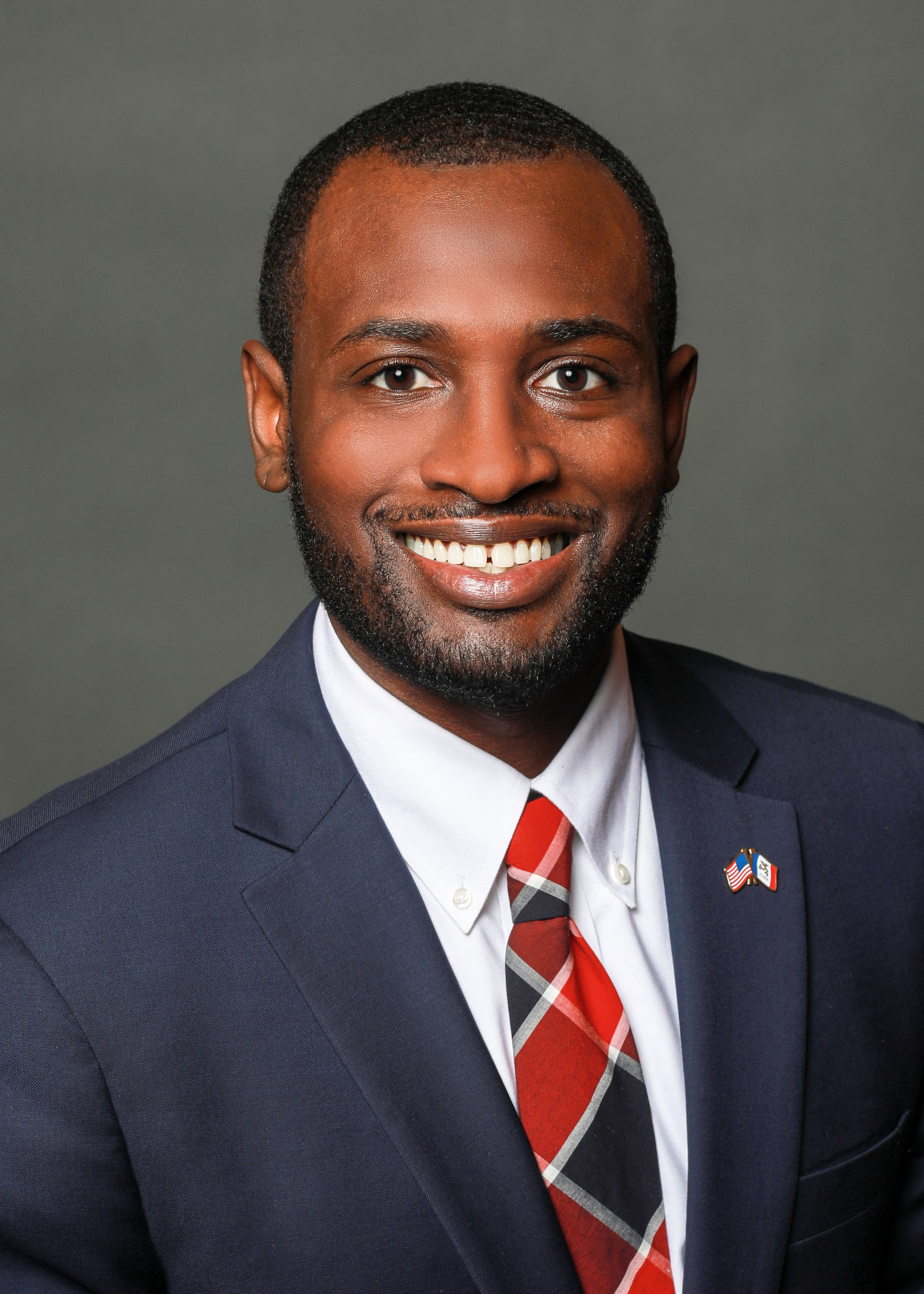

Member of the Iowa House of Representatives from the 62nd district
- In office January 9, 2017 – January 8, 2023
- Preceded by: Deborah Berry
- Succeeded by: Jerome Amos

Personal details
- Born: RasTafari Smith; December 29, 1987 (age 38) Waterloo, Iowa, U.S.
- Party: Democratic
- Spouse: Amelia
- Children: 2
- Education: Wartburg College; Iowa State University; University of Northern Iowa (BS)

RasTafari I. "Ras" Smith (born December 29, 1987) is an American politician from Iowa. He served in the Iowa House of Representatives from 2017 to 2023, as a legislator from District 62.

== Personal life, education, and early career ==
RasTafari Smith was named for the royal title and given name of Haile Selassie. The name was selected by his mother, Belinda Creighton-Smith, a pastor. Smith's father L. C. is a retired factory worker for John Deere. His brothers include Rameses and Myron. Smith is married to Amelia, an educator, with whom he has two children.

Smith was raised in northeast Waterloo, Iowa, and attended Northern University High School in Cedar Falls, Iowa. He enrolled at Wartburg College and Iowa State University before completing a bachelor's degree in exercise science at the University of Northern Iowa. Smith then worked as the strength and conditioning coach at Waterloo East High School and volunteered as a member of the high school's American football coaching staff. He left East High to work at a Target Corporation distribution center, then joined Four Oaks, a special education program, as a counselor and later, shift leader. During his time at Four Oaks, Smith worked toward a master's degree in leisure, youth and human services from the University of Northern Iowa. After completing his master's degree, Smith began working for Communities In Schools.

Smith is a Baptist.

== Political career ==
After Deborah Berry announced her retirement, her seat in District 62 was left open. Smith contested that seat in 2016 as a Democratic Party candidate, defeating Republican Party candidate Todd Obadal and political independent John Patterson. Smith was reelected in 2018 and 2020, both times uncontested.

On June 15, 2021, Smith announced that he would run for governor of Iowa in 2022. He suspended his campaign in January 2022, citing lack of funds. A month later, Smith stated that he would not be running for reelection to the state legislature. As a result of redistricting prior to the 2022 state legislative elections, Smith's residence was placed in House District 61, a seat held by Timi Brown-Powers. In April 2022, Smith joined Michael T. Franken's United States Senate campaign.
