= Ashley Hinson =

American politician and journalist (born 1983)

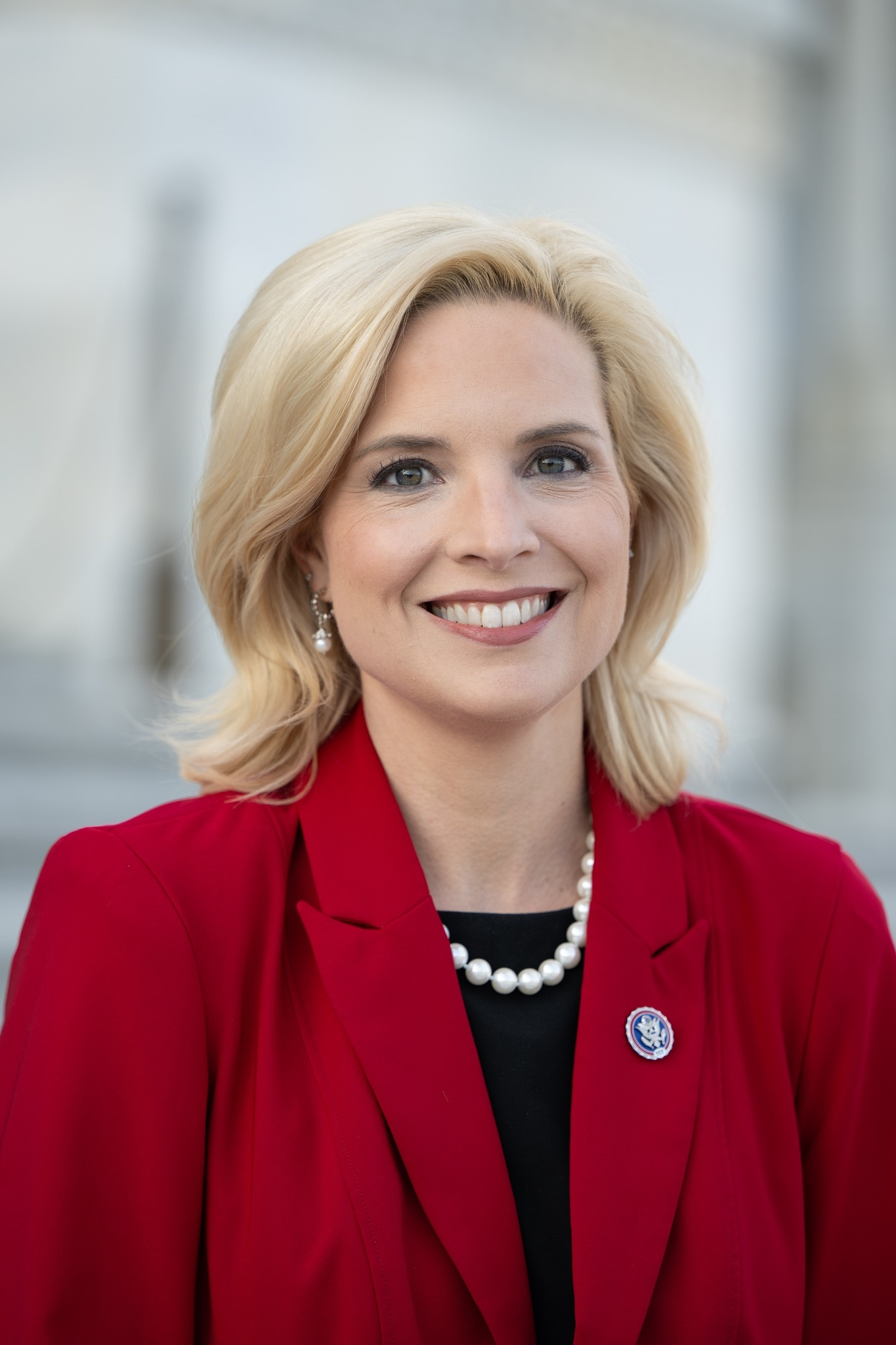
- Official portrait, 2024

Member of the U.S. House of Representatives from Iowa
- Incumbent
- Assumed office January 3, 2021
- Preceded by: Abby Finkenauer
- Constituency: 1st district (2021–2023); 2nd district (2023–present)

Member of the Iowa House of Representatives from the 67th district
- In office January 9, 2017 – January 3, 2021
- Preceded by: Kraig Paulsen
- Succeeded by: Eric Gjerde

Personal details
- Born: Ashley Elizabeth Hinson; June 27, 1983 (age 43) Des Moines, Iowa, U.S.
- Party: Republican
- Spouse: Matt Arenholz
- Children: 2
- Education: University of Southern California (BA)
- Website: House website Campaign website

Ashley Elizabeth Hinson (born June 27, 1983) is an American politician, and former broadcast journalist, serving as the U.S. representative for Iowa's 2nd congressional district since 2021. A member of the Republican Party, she was a member of the Iowa House of Representatives for the 67th district from 2017 to 2021.

Hinson was a reporter and anchor at KCRG-TV in Cedar Rapids for more than a decade. She was elected to the U.S. House in the 2020 election, narrowly defeating incumbent Democrat Abby Finkenauer. Hinson is tied with Mariannette Miller-Meeks as the first Republican woman to represent Iowa in the U.S. House.

Hinson won reelection to Congress in 2022 and 2024. She was the unsuccessful Republican nominee in the 2026 United States Senate election in Iowa to replace retiring Republican Joni Ernst, losing to Democrat Josh Turek.

== Early life, education, and career ==
Hinson was born in Des Moines, Iowa. Her father was a financial advisor and her mother was a teacher. She is a graduate of Valley High School in West Des Moines and the University of Southern California, where she studied broadcast journalism. She is an alumna of the Pi Beta Phi sorority.

Hinson was a news and entertainment intern at KABC-TV in Los Angeles and worked for WOI-TV in Des Moines as a camera operator and editor for their evening newscasts. Hinson worked as an anchor and reporter for KCRG-TV for over a decade. She won two regional Emmy Awards.

== Iowa House of Representatives ==
=== Elections ===
In 2016, Hinson ran for Iowa's 67th House district, based in Linn County. She defeated Democrat Mark Seidl, 62.5%–37.5%.

This Cedar Rapids suburban district is typically highly competitive. 2016 Democratic presidential nominee Hillary Clinton won it over Donald Trump by two percentage points.

In 2018, Hinson faced a competitive race against teacher Eric Gjerde. She defeated him, 52%–48%.

=== Committee assignments ===
In the Iowa House, Hinson served on the Judiciary, Public Safety, and Transportation Committees, which she chaired. She also served on the Transportation, Infrastructure, and Capitals Appropriations Subcommittee.

== U.S. House of Representatives ==
=== Elections ===
==== 2020 ====
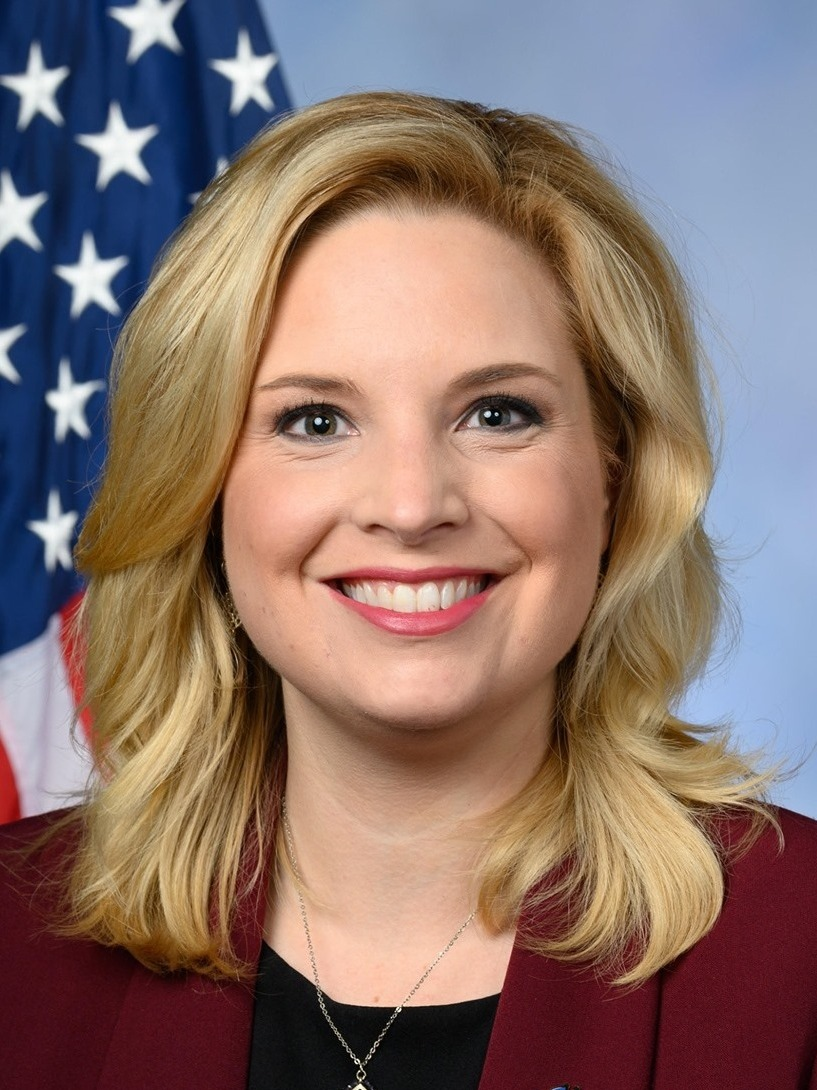
Hinson during the 117th Congress

On May 13, 2019, Hinson filed paperwork to run against first term Democratic incumbent Abby Finkenauer in Iowa's 1st congressional district.

The district, which encompasses 20 counties in northeastern Iowa, was flipped in the 2018 election. Hinson was announced as a "contender" by the National Republican Congressional Committee. She was endorsed by Iowa governor Kim Reynolds and lieutenant governor Adam Gregg. On June 2, 2020, Hinson won the Republican primary.

Hinson focused her campaign on cutting taxes and building infrastructure. In July 2020, The New York Times reported several instances of Hinson's campaign website plagiarizing portions of articles from media outlets. Hinson said she "was unaware of the plagiarism when I reviewed drafts presented to me by staff. As a journalist I take this extremely seriously and am deeply sorry for the mistake. The staff responsible will be held accountable."

Hinson defeated Finkenauer in the November general election. Hinson won by more than 10,000 votes—she garnered 51.2% of the vote while Finkenauer finished with 48.6%.

==== 2022 ====
On October 29, 2021, most of Hinson's territory, including her home in Marion, near Cedar Rapids, became the 2nd district due to redistricting, and Hinson announced she would seek reelection there. In effect, she traded district numbers with fellow freshman Republican Mariannette Miller-Meeks. Hinson defeated Democratic state Senator Liz Mathis in the general election.

==== 2024 ====
On November 5, 2024, Hinson was re-elected with 57.1% of the vote, defeating Democrat Sarah Corkery.

=== Committee assignments ===
For the 119th Congress:

- Committee on Appropriations
  - Subcommittee on Agriculture, Rural Development, Food and Drug Administration, and Related Agencies
  - Subcommittee on Financial Services and General Government
  - Subcommittee on Homeland Security
- Select Committee on Strategic Competition between the United States and the Chinese Communist Party
- United States House Committee on Ethics

=== Caucus memberships ===
- Republican Study Committee
- Congressional Biofuels Caucus, Co-Chair

== Policy positions ==
According to GovTrack, Hinson's voting record in the 118th Congress (2023–25) was more conservative than around three-fourths of Republican House members.

=== Abortion ===
Hinson opposes the legal right to have an abortion with the exception for rape, incest, and the life of the mother.

=== AI ===
Hinson is one of the leading advocates of AI development and AI data centers in Congress, according to Newsweek, who described her support as unusual among "Midwestern GOP candidates" running in the 2026 election.

She is supportive of continued research towards artificial general intelligence and preparation for workers to adapt to AI-job losses, portraying it as an arms race against China. "Because the truth is: if we don't, China will."

=== Agriculture ===
In 2023, Hinson introduced the Ending Agricultural Trade Suppression (EATS) Act, which sought to prohibit state and local governments from imposing animal welfare regulations and production standards on agricultural goods sold in interstate commerce. In 2026, it was modified and reintroduced as Save Our Bacon (SOB) Act, which intends to block states from enforcing animal welfare and protection laws. The proposal became a key point of contention during negotiations over the United States farm bill.

=== Economic issues ===
In 2020, Hinson said she was open to raising the retirement age for Social Security as a step to preserve the program for future generations.

Hinson, along with all other Senate and House Republicans, voted against the American Rescue Plan Act of 2021.

In 2023, Hinson and Congresswoman Alma Adams (Democrat of North Carolina) introduced legislation to clarify that maternal and child health block grant funds can be used for activities related to stillbirth prevention. This bill, H.R. 4581, passed the House 408 to 3, passed the Senate by unanimous consent, and was signed into law in July of 2024.

In 2025, Hinson voted in favor of President Trump's tax and policy legislation, the One Big Beautiful Bill Act. Hinson held events celebrating the bill's passage; the events were attended by both supporters and opponents of the legislation.

=== Foreign policy ===
In 2026, Hinson voted against a measure to require President Trump to seek congressional authorization to continue the 2026 Iran war. Hinson said Trump "possesses the inherent constitutional authority as our commander in chief to protect our American personnel and the interests in the region and to protect Americans here at home". But she has also said that, Iowans "shouldn’t have to foot the bill at the pump or the checkout line for the war in Iran", and has proposed measures to reduce the burden on Iowans.

=== Healthcare ===
Hinson voted against extending the Affordable Care Act enhanced tax credits. She opposes the Affordable Care Act and prefers a shift to health savings accounts.

In 2022, she voted against the Affordable Insulin Now Act which capped the cost of insulin at $35.

=== LGBT rights ===
On February 25, 2021, Hinson voted against the Equality Act, before the United States House of Representatives, which would outlaw discrimination on the basis of sex, sexual orientation, and gender identity in the United States Code and effectively codify the decision of the Supreme Court of the United States in Bostock v. Clayton County, on the basis of her belief that the act "threatens religious liberty".

On July 19, 2022, Hinson voted for the Respect for Marriage Act, before the United States House of Representatives, which would protect both inter-racial marriage in the United States and same-sex marriage in the United States, and effectively codify the decisions of the Supreme Court of the United States in both Loving v. Virginia and Obergefell v. Hodges, on the basis of her belief that the act "maintains the status quo".

On September 26, 2025, Hinson said that she was "appalled" at what she described as "abuse" concerning the mention of bisexuality in Linn-Mar High School student announcements, and demanded both state action by the Governor of Iowa, Kim Reynolds, and federal action by the United States Secretary of Education, Linda McMahon, against the school.

== 2026 U.S. Senate campaign ==
On September 2, 2025, Hinson announced her candidacy for the 2026 United States Senate election in Iowa, following incumbent Senator Joni Ernst's announcement that she would not seek reelection. She won the Republican primary, defeating former state senator Jim Carlin, and lost in the November general election to Democratic nominee Josh Turek.

In September 2026, Hinson called for a swift end to the war in Iran, marking a shift from her earlier support for Trump's authority to strike Tehran. She had previously voted six times against House measures aimed at curbing Trump's war powers. In a social media post, she said Iowans "are being squeezed and shouldn't have to foot the bill at the pump or the checkout line for the war in Iran," and called for suspending gasoline taxes, pausing diesel exports, and bringing the war "to a successful and immediate end". Diesel prices carry particular political weight in Iowa, where agriculture plays an outsized role in the state's economy and farmers rely heavily on diesel-powered equipment and transportation.

== Personal life ==
Hinson is a resident of Marion, Iowa. She is married to Matt Arenholz, an insurance executive who previously did work in government affairs for an insurance trade and lobbying group. They have two children.

Hinson is a Protestant.

== Electoral history ==
Election	Political result	Candidate	Party	Votes	%
2018 Iowa House of Representatives general election District 67; Turnout: 16,537	Republican hold	Ashley Hinson	Republican	8,593	52.0%
2018 Iowa House of Representatives general election District 67; Turnout: 16,537	Republican hold	Eric Gjerde	Democratic	7,932	48.0%
2018 Iowa House of Representatives general election District 67; Turnout: 16,537	Republican hold	Write-in votes		12	0.1%
2016 Iowa House of Representatives general election District 67; Turnout: 17,997	Republican hold	Ashley Hinson	Republican	11,248	62.50%
2016 Iowa House of Representatives general election District 67; Turnout: 17,997	Republican hold	Mark Seidl	Democratic	6,749	37.50%

2020 election for U.S. Representative of Iowa's 1st congressional district
Party	Candidate	Votes	%
Republican	Ashley Hinson	212,088	51.2
Democratic	Abby Finkenauer (incumbent)	201,347	48.7
Write-in		434	0.1

2022 election for U.S. Representative of Iowa's 2nd congressional district
Party	Candidate	Votes	%
Republican	Ashley Hinson (incumbent)	172,181	54.1
Democratic	Liz Mathis	145,940	45.8
Write-in		278	0.1

2024 Election for U.S. Representative of Iowa's 2nd congressional district
Party	Candidate	Votes	%
Republican	Ashley Hinson (incumbent)	233,340	57.1
Democratic	Sarah Corkery	169,740	41.5
Independent	Jody Puffett	5,381	1.3
Write-in		341	0.1
Total votes		408,802	100.0
Republican hold			

== See also ==
- Women in the United States House of Representatives

U.S. House of Representatives
Preceded by Abby Finkenauer	Member of the U.S. House of Representatives from Iowa's 1st congressional district 2021–2023	Succeeded by Mariannette Miller-Meeks
Preceded by Mariannette Miller-Meeks	Member of the U.S. House of Representatives from Iowa's 2nd congressional district 2023–present	Incumbent
Party political offices
Preceded by Joni Ernst	Republican nominee for U.S. Senator from Iowa (Class 2); 2026	Most recent
U.S. order of precedence (ceremonial)
Preceded by Diana Harshbarger	United States representatives by seniority 255th	Succeeded by Ronny Jackson
