= Kent Sorenson =

American politician

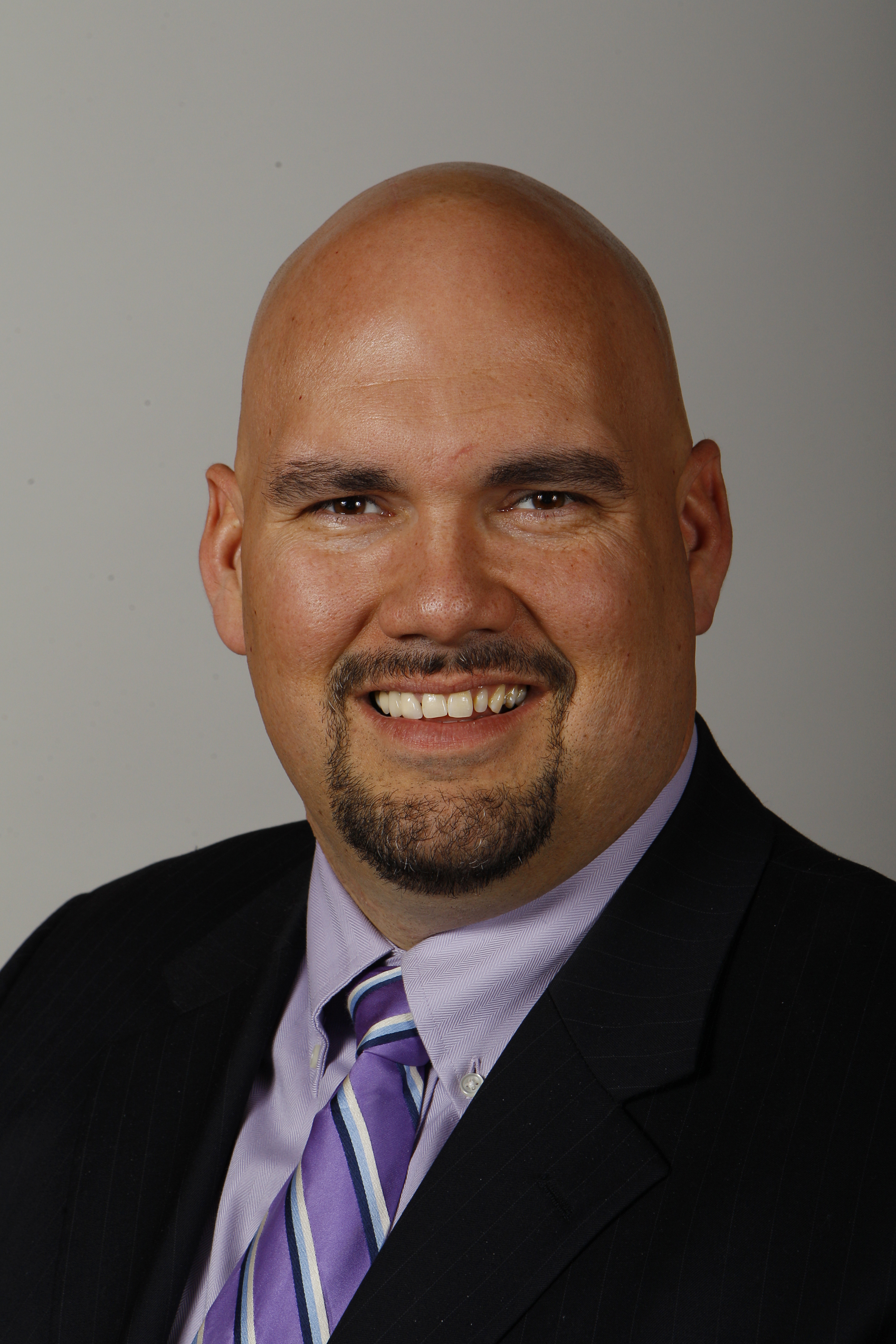

Member of the Iowa Senate from the 13th district
- In office January 14, 2013 – October 2, 2013
- Preceded by: Tod Bowman
- Succeeded by: Julian Garrett

Member of the Iowa Senate from the 37th district
- In office January 10, 2011 – January 14, 2013
- Preceded by: Staci Appel
- Succeeded by: Robert Dvorsky

Member of the Iowa House of Representatives from the 74th district
- In office January 12, 2009 – January 9, 2011
- Preceded by: Mark Davitt
- Succeeded by: Glen Massie

Personal details
- Born: March 29, 1972 (age 54) Des Moines, Iowa, U.S.
- Party: Republican
- Spouse: Shawnee
- Children: 6
- Website: Sorenson's legislative webpage

Kent Sorenson (born March 29, 1972) is a former Iowa state legislator who resigned after pleading guilty to obstruction of justice and other felonies related to campaign finances.

Sorenson graduated from Indianola High School in 1990. He was the owner and operator of Pro-Kleen Maintenance. According to his LinkedIn profile, Sorenson is currently a realtor with EXIT Realty North Star in Norwalk, IA. Sorenson is not listed as an agent on the EXIT website.

Sorenson resigned from office on October 2, 2013, after Iowa's Senate Ethics committee found "probable cause" that Sorenson violated state ethics rules by taking illegal payments from the Michele Bachmann and Ron Paul campaigns in the 2012 Republican presidential primaries and that "his denials of doing so constituted felonious misconduct in office." He was sentenced to 15 months in prison after pleading guilty to one count of causing a federal campaign committee to falsely report its expenditures to the FEC and one count of obstruction of justice.

== Electoral history ==
Sorenson was elected to the Iowa House of Representatives in 2008, defeating incumbent Democrat Mark Davitt. He ran for the Senate in 2010, defeating incumbent Democrat Staci Appel.

A Republican, Sorenson served in the Iowa House from 2009 to 2011, representing District 74, and then District 37 in the Iowa Senate. As of October 2013, he was a member of the Judiciary, Government Oversight, and State Government committees of the Iowa Senate. He was also the ranking member of both the Senate and Joint Oversight Committees and a member of the Advisory Council for Agricultural Education, the Family Development and Self-Sufficiency Council, and the Human Rights Board.

Election	Political result	Candidate	Party	Votes	%
Iowa House of Representatives elections, 2008; District 74; Turnout: 17,547	Republican gain from Democratic	Kent Sorenson	Republican	8,846	50.4
Iowa House of Representatives elections, 2008; District 74; Turnout: 17,547	Republican gain from Democratic	Mark Davitt*	Democratic	8,683	49.5
Iowa Senate elections, 2010; District 37; Turnout: 29,139	Republican gain from Democratic	Kent Sorenson	Republican	16,748	57.5
Iowa Senate elections, 2010; District 37; Turnout: 29,139	Republican gain from Democratic	Staci Appel*	Democratic	11,646	40.0

*incumbent

== Campaign finance violations ==
On December 28, 2011, Sorenson resigned as Michele Bachmann's Iowa campaign chairman and endorsed Ron Paul for president. He made the announcement at a rally for Paul on December 28, 2011, saying, "I believe we're at a turning point in this campaign. I thought it was my duty to come to his aid, just like he came to my aid during my Senate race."

=== Initial investigation ===
In July 2012, Barb Heki, a Johnston, Iowa, woman who once worked for Bachmann, began legal proceedings against the former Bachmann campaign and her senior campaign aides, claiming Sorenson took an email list from her private computer to promote Bachmann's candidacy among Christian homeschooling advocates before the Iowa caucuses, and that she was unjustly blamed for its use. (Court papers said she had told Sorenson that she would not provide the list to the campaign.) On September 11, Heki filed a police report stating that a private email list was stolen from her office at Bachmann's Iowa campaign office in Urbandale, Iowa, sometime between November 1 and November 10, 2011. The police report lists the suspect as a 40-year-old man from Milo who is a state senator, but does not give the legislator's name. Sorenson, 40 at the time of the incident, was the only state senator from Milo. The lawsuit also claims that Sorenson and Bachmann defamed Heki. Sorenson's lawyer said his client did not "make any defamatory or disparaging comments against Barb Heki. We'll present evidence that Senator Sorenson never said anything that could be construed as defamatory."

In August 2013, conservative activist Dennis Fusaro claimed that Sorenson backed Ron Paul in the 2012 presidential campaign after demanding money from the Paul campaign. State senate rules prohibit campaigns from paying senators directly or indirectly. The Iowa Senate Ethics Committee assigned a state special investigator, who reported "probable cause" that Sorenson had broken Senate rules by accepting money for presidential campaign work. The 566-page report stated that Sorenson had received a $25,000 check from a top official of Paul's presidential campaign, as well as from a political action committee connected to the Bachmann campaign. Sorenson switched from Bachmann's campaign to Paul's in the closing days of the GOP caucuses. Bachmann claimed at the time that he defected to her competitor's team because they were paying him to do so. Sorenson had long denied being paid by any of the presidential campaigns. The investigator's report said Sorenson's denials may have violated state law, a class D felony for felonious misconduct by a public official.

The U.S. Justice Department has since subpoenaed records in connection with possible illegal campaign coordination between Bachmann's campaign and another PAC, but is at present unclear which federal law(s) the Department believes may have been broken. The New York Times has reported on a grand jury investigation that began after Heki filed her complaints with the Federal Election Commission. The Federal Bureau of Investigation executed a search warrant in mid-November 2013 at Sorenson's home, confiscating computers and other materials relating to communications. The Des Moines Register reported that the search was related to investigations of Sorenson's actions in the Bachmann and Paul campaigns.

=== Resignation ===
Sorenson resigned from the Iowa Senate on October 2, 2013, after a special investigator appointed by the Iowa Supreme Court, Mark Weinhardt, found he likely violated ethics rules by taking money from political entities connected to Bachmann and Paul, but denied he had done so. According to the report, Sorenson received a $25,000 check and a $73,000 electronic banking transfer from the Paul campaign. On October 3, 2013, Iowa Attorney General's Office spokesman Geoff Greenwood said Sorenson could be charged with a crime and prosecuted. Polk County Attorney John P. Sarcone said his office would review the report and consider filing charges if the facts warranted it.

== Domestic abuse ==
On July 17, 2015, Warren County Sheriff's Deputies arrested Sorenson near Milo after a passerby noticed a disturbance and called authorities. The arrest report indicates two deputies were injured during the arrest. Sorenson was charged with domestic abuse, assault and interference with official acts.

The arrest report states Sorenson's wife, Jeannie Shawntell "Shawnee" Sorenson, was crying and left the house through a bedroom window after an argument and was observed walking down the road near Milo when someone called 911. Deputies reported Shawnee had redness around her left eye and stated she had been struck by Sorenson, who is right-handed. During the arrest, Sorenson was aggressive with officers, banging his head against a squad car cage. He was charged with one count of domestic abuse and two counts of interference with official acts.

A February 23, 2016, trial for the three counts was canceled after prosecutors and Sorenson reached a plea agreement. Sorenson made an Alford plea to the disorderly conduct charge, maintaining his innocence while admitting that he could be found guilty under the facts of the incident. The disorderly conduct charge is a simple misdemeanor and Sorenson faces a fine. The attorney representing Sorenson on the federal charges contended it is difficult to know exactly how the misdemeanor conviction might affect Sorenson's eventual sentencing in the corruption case. Under federal sentencing guidelines, having a criminal history can increase the recommended amount of time a defendant should spend incarcerated.

== Federal charges ==
Sorenson pleaded guilty to one count of causing a federal campaign committee to falsely report its expenditures to the FEC and one count of obstruction of justice in connection with the concealed expenditures on August 27, 2014. The Sorenson Statement of Facts implicates then Ron Paul campaign chairman Jesse Benton, campaign manager John Tate and deputy campaign manager Demetri Kesari in the payments to Sorenson. Benton was indicted for allegedly arranging $73,000 in payments to Sorenson to convince him to flip his endorsement from Bachmann to Paul. Benton, Tate and Kesari were all found guilty. Sorenson faces up to 25 years in prison following his guilty plea. The guilty plea was taken by Chief Magistrate Judge Celeste F. Bremer of the Southern District of Iowa for later review by Senior District Court Judge Robert W. Pratt.

=== Sentencing ===
Sorenson failed a condition of pre-sentencing probation on September 30, 2014, as a drug test came back positive for marijuana. The probation officer assigned to him asked that no action be taken in response to the drug test.

At a February 19, 2015, hearing before U.S. District Judge Robert W. Pratt, both sides sought a delay in sentencing because of a "larger investigation" of campaign misconduct. On January 17, 2017, Judge Robert Pratt sentenced Sorenson to 15 months in prison and allowed him to turn himself in at a later date to begin his sentence. As Sorenson and his supporters left the courthouse after the sentencing, one of his daughters, Makala Sorenson-Barnes, attacked a photographer covering the event for WHO TV and screamed profanities as Sorenson, and another daughter left the courthouse and hurriedly walked to a waiting vehicle without comment.

Iowa Senate
Preceded by Staci Appel	37th District; 2011 – 2013	Succeeded by Julian Garrett
Iowa House of Representatives
Preceded by Mark Davitt	74th District; 2009 – 2011	Succeeded by Glen Massie
