= Barbara Finch =

American politician

Member of the Iowa House of Representatives from the 62nd district
- In office January 8, 2001 – January 12, 2003
- Preceded by: Dennis Parmenter
- Succeeded by: Frank Chiodo

Personal details
- Born: Barbara Ann Davis; November 17, 1952 New York City, New York
- Died: December 17, 2008 (aged 56) Interstate 35, Freeborn County, Minnesota
- Party: Republican
- Spouse: Robert Finch (m. 1981)
- Children: Three
- Parent(s): James and Ruth Davis
- Occupation: Businessman

Barbara Ann Finch (November 17, 1952 – December 17, 2008) was an American politician.

Barbara Ann Davis was born in New York City to parents James and Ruth Davis on November 17, 1952. She attended Nassau Community College and Creighton University. Davis married Robert Finch in 1981. The couple farmed and raised three children near Ames, Iowa.

Barbara Finch served on a number of agricultural commissions, including the Story County Farm Bureau, Story County Cattleman's Association, and the Governor's Task Force for Sustainable Agriculture, as well as the Ballard School Board. She was elected to the Iowa House of Representatives in 2000, as a Republican, succeeding Dennis Parmenter as the legislator from District 62. Finch contested the Iowa Senate's 23rd District seat in 2002, losing the general election to Herman Quirmbach.

After leaving the state legislature, Finch worked for Mary Greeley Medical Center. Finch died on December 17, 2008, aged 56. She and her daughter were traveling on Interstate 35 in Freeborn County, Minnesota, near Albert Lea, when their van collided with a pickup that had slid into oncoming traffic. The Finches' vehicle then struck a semi-trailer truck. Barbara Finch was declared dead at the scene. Her daughter survived with injuries.
