= David N. May =

American judge in Iowa (born 1971)

David May

Associate Justice of the Iowa Supreme Court
- Incumbent
- Assumed office July 27, 2022
- Appointed by: Kim Reynolds
- Preceded by: Brent R. Appel

Personal details
- Born: David Noel May; May 23, 1971 (age 55)
- Education: Truman State University (attended); University of Missouri (BA); University of Oklahoma, Oklahoma City (MPH); Drake University (JD)

David Noel May (born May 23, 1971) is an American lawyer from Iowa who has served as an associate justice of the Iowa Supreme Court since 2022.

== Education ==
May grew up in Missouri. He started college at Truman State University before finishing his Bachelor of Arts at the University of Missouri. He then received a Master of Public Health from the University of Oklahoma Health Sciences Center, for which he won the Graduate Student Association Award for Outstanding Academic Achievement, and a Juris Doctor, with high honors, from Drake University Law School. In law school, May was elected to the Order of the Coif, won awards for the best student in five classes, and served on the Drake Law Review.

== Legal career ==
Following law school, May practiced at Hawkins & Norris, P.C. in Des Moines, Iowa for three years, specializing in grain contract litigation. He then joined Bradshaw, Fowler, Proctor & Fairgrave, P.C. in Des Moines in 2001, and was a partner at that firm from 2005 until his appointment to the bench in 2016. At Bradshaw, May practiced commercial litigation and insurance defense.

== Judicial career ==
=== Iowa District Court ===
In February 2016, May was appointed as state District Judge in Judicial Election District 5C, which covers the south-central portion of Iowa.

=== Iowa Court of Appeals ===
On May 2, 2019, Governor Kim Reynolds appointed May to the Iowa Court of Appeals to fill the vacancy left by the elevation of Christopher McDonald to the Iowa Supreme Court. May served as the co-chair of a committee to revise the Iowa Rules of Appellate Procedure.

=== Iowa Supreme Court ===
May was among five applicants who applied for a vacancy on the Supreme Court, and ultimately one of three finalists whose names were submitted to the governor. On July 27, 2022, Governor Kim Reynolds appointed May to the Iowa Supreme Court to fill the vacancy left by the retirement of Justice Brent R. Appel. May is Reynolds' fifth appointment to the supreme court. With May's appointment, all seven supreme court justices have been appointed by Republican governors.

== Personal life ==
May is a former member of the International Defensive Pistol Association and the National Rifle Association of America. He resides in Polk City, Iowa.

Legal offices
Preceded by Brent R. Appel	Associate Justice of the Iowa Supreme Court; 2022–present	Incumbent
