= William R. Sullivan =

American politician (born 1945)

William R. Sullivan (born March 29, 1945) is an American retired politician.

Sullivan was born on March 29, 1945, in Decatur, Illinois, to parents Wade and Ruth. After graduating from Fox Valley High School in 1963, Sullivan earned an Associate of Arts at Centerville Community College in 1965. He served in the United States Army for two years and married Kyong Cha Pak in 1968.

Sullivan was a member of the city council of Cantril, Iowa, for five years prior to his election to District 87 of the Iowa House of Representatives in 1980. He was reelected twice thereafter, for District 62. Throughout his political career, Sullivan was affiliated with the Democratic Party.
