= Brent R. Appel =

American judge (born 1950)

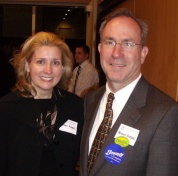

Associate Justice of the Iowa Supreme Court
- In office 2006 – July 13, 2022
- Nominated by: Tom Vilsack
- Preceded by: James H. Carter
- Succeeded by: David N. May

Personal details
- Born: July 13, 1950 (age 76) Dubuque, Iowa, U.S.
- Spouse: Staci Appel
- Education: Stanford University (BA, MA); University of California, Berkeley (JD)

Brent Robert Appel (born July 13, 1950) is an American attorney, politician and former judge who served as a justice of the Iowa Supreme Court from 2006 to 2022. Appel was previously an attorney in the office of the Attorney General of Iowa and was the Democratic Congressional Candidate in Iowa's Second District in 1982.

== Early life and education ==
Appel is a native of Dubuque, Iowa. He graduated from Stanford University with concurrent Bachelor of Arts and Master of Arts degrees in history in 1973. He earned his Juris Doctor at the University of California, Berkeley School of Law in 1977. At Berkeley, he was an editor of the California Law Review and won the McBaine Moot Court.

== Career ==
After graduating from law school, Appel clerked on the United States Court of Appeals for the District of Columbia Circuit.

Appel was then First Assistant Attorney General of Iowa from 1979 to 1983 and deputy Attorney General from 1983 until 1987. While working at the Iowa Attorney General's Office, he argued four cases before the Supreme Court of the United States, including Nix v. Williams and Nix v. Whiteside.

From 1987 to 2006, Appel worked in private practice in Des Moines, including at the law firms Dickinson, Mackaman, Tyler & Hagan P.C. and Wandro, Baer, Appel & Casper P.C. He specialized in commercial litigation, employment law, and personal injury.

Appel unsuccessfully ran once for Congress in Iowa's Second Congressional District.

== Iowa Supreme Court ==
Appel was nominated by Iowa Governor Tom Vilsack for a term starting in 2006 to succeed James H. Carter on the Iowa Supreme Court.

In 2010, Chief Justice John Roberts appointed Appel to a six-year term as a member of the Federal Advisory Committee on the Rules of Evidence.

On June 17, 2022, Appel wrote a 94 page dissent when the Iowa Supreme Court ruled 5-2 that abortion is not protected by the state constitution.

Appel also dissented in the June 30, 2022 case that made it harder to sue hog confinements for pollution. Appel wrote “are we telling the existing property owners that they are required to ‘take one for the team’ as the private owners next door emit nuisance odors under a scheme of statutory immunity?”

Appel retired on July 13, 2022, after reaching the mandatory retirement age of 72. In June 2022, it was announced Appel would be joining the faculty of Drake University Law School.

== Personal life ==
Appel's wife, Staci Appel, is a former member of the Iowa Senate from the 37th district. She was the Democratic nominee for Iowa's 3rd congressional district in 2014. Appel has six children.

Political offices
Preceded by James H. Carter	Justice of the Iowa Supreme Court; 2006–2022	Succeeded by David N. May
