= William Bernau =

American politician

Member of the Iowa House of Representatives from the 62nd district
- In office January 11, 1993 – January 10, 1999
- Preceded by: Philip Wise
- Succeeded by: Dennis Parmenter

Member of the Iowa House of Representatives from the 73rd district
- In office January 14, 1991 – January 10, 1993
- Preceded by: Ralph Rosenberg
- Succeeded by: Betty Grundberg

Personal details
- Born: November 11, 1964 (age 61) Charles City, Iowa, U.S.
- Party: Democratic
- Spouse: Judy Eike
- Children: 2

William Bernau (born November 11, 1964) is a former American politician.

William Bernau was born in Charles City, Iowa, to parents Gary and Patricia Bernau on November 11, 1964. Upon graduating from Charles City High School, Bernau enrolled at North Iowa Area Community College, and subsequently earned a Bachelor of Science degree in public service and administration from Iowa State University in 1987. He worked as a political consultant. In 1990, Bernau won his first term as a member of the Iowa House of Representatives and was seated as the legislator from District 73. He won reelection thrice thereafter, all from District 62.
