= Bruce Hunter (politician) =

American politician (born 1955)

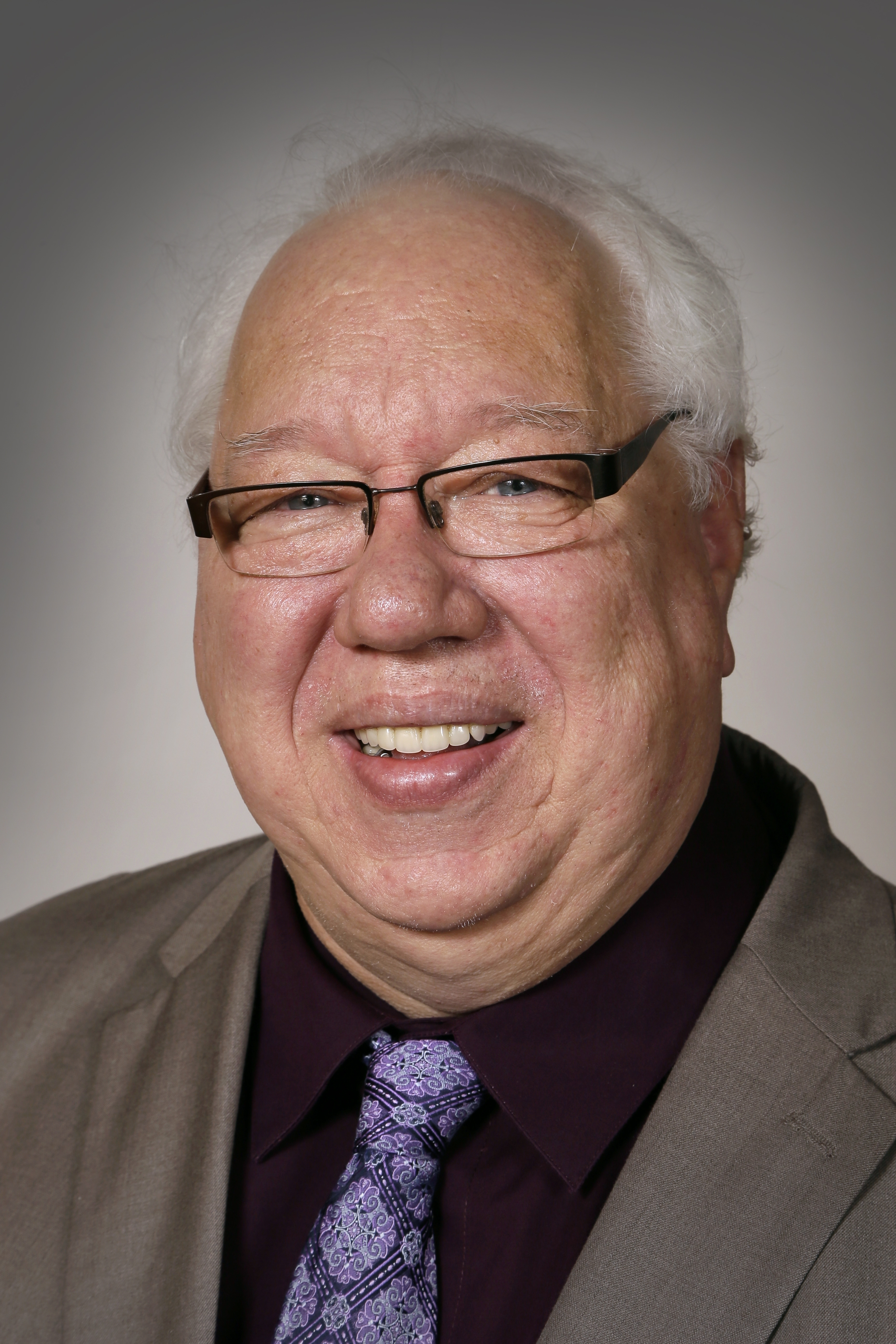
- 86th General Assembly portrait (2015)

Member of the Iowa House of Representatives from the 34th district 62nd (2003–2013)
- In office February 12, 2003 – January 9, 2023
- Preceded by: Dennis Parmenter
- Succeeded by: Ako Abdul-Samad (redistricting)

Personal details
- Born: June 22, 1955 (age 71) Alma, Wisconsin, U.S.
- Party: Democratic
- Spouse: Betty Brim-Hunter
- Education: Saint Cloud State University; Winona State University
- Profession: Loan counselor (retired)
- Website: legis.iowa.gov/...

Bruce L. Hunter (born June 22, 1955) is a former Iowa State Representative from the 34th District. He served in the Iowa House of Representatives from 2003, when he was elected in a January special election to replace Frank Chiodo, who resigned before term start to become the legislative liaison for the Iowa Department for Economic Development, to 2023. Hunter was born in Alma, Wisconsin, was raised in Wisconsin and Minnesota, and resides in Des Moines, Iowa. He attended Saint Cloud State University and Winona State University.

As of May 2013, Hunter serves on several committees in the Iowa House – the Human Resources and State Government committees. He also serves as the ranking member of the Labor committee and as a member of the Administration and Regulation Appropriations Subcommittee.

== Electoral history ==
*incumbent

Early 62nd District contests

Election	Political result	Candidate	Party	Votes	%
Iowa House of Representatives special election, 2003; District 62; Turnout: 1,912	Democratic hold	Bruce L. Hunter	Democratic	1,146	59.94%
Iowa House of Representatives special election, 2003; District 62; Turnout: 1,912	Democratic hold	Charles S. Scavo	Republican	758	39.64%
Iowa House of Representatives primary elections, 2004; District 62	Democratic	Bruce Hunter*	Democratic	unopposed	
Iowa House of Representatives general elections, 2004; District 62	Democratic hold	Bruce Hunter*	Democratic	unopposed	
Iowa House of Representatives primary elections, 2006; District 62	Democratic	Bruce Hunter*	Democratic	unopposed	
Iowa House of Representatives general elections, 2006; District 62	Democratic hold	Bruce Hunter*	Democratic	unopposed	

Election	Political result	Candidate	Party	Votes	%
Iowa House of Representatives primary elections, 2008; District 62	Democratic	Bruce Hunter*	Democratic	unopposed	
Iowa House of Representatives general elections, 2008; District 62; Turnout: 12,435	Democratic hold	Bruce Hunter*	Democratic	7,381	59.36%
Iowa House of Representatives general elections, 2008; District 62; Turnout: 12,435	Democratic hold	Chris Sanger	Republican	4261	34.27%
Iowa House of Representatives primary elections, 2010; District 62	Democratic	Bruce Hunter*	Democratic	unopposed	
Iowa House of Representatives general elections, 2010; District 62	Democratic hold	Bruce Hunter*	Democratic	unopposed	
Iowa House of Representatives primary elections, 2012; District 34	Democratic	Bruce L. Hunter*	Democratic	unopposed	
Iowa House of Representatives general elections, 2012; District 34; Turnout: 14,323	Democratic (newly redistricted)	Bruce L. Hunter*	Democratic	8,813	61.53%
Iowa House of Representatives general elections, 2012; District 34; Turnout: 14,323	Democratic (newly redistricted)	Patti Branco	Republican	4,608	32.17%

Iowa House of Representatives
Preceded by Dennis Parmenter	62nd District; 2003–2013	Succeeded by Deborah Berry
Preceded by Todd Taylor	34th District; 2013–2023	Succeeded by Ako Abdul-Samad
