= Joel W. Brown =

American politician (born 1964)

Member of the Iowa House of Representatives from the 67th district
- In office January 9, 1989 – January 10, 1993

Personal details
- Born: August 10, 1964 (age 61) Des Moines, Iowa, U.S.
- Party: Democratic
- Spouse: Kristin Senty-Brown (m. 1989)
- Children: 1
- Education: Chariton High School; Northwest Missouri State University
- Occupation: Politician

Joel W. Brown (born August 10, 1964) is an American Democratic politician from Iowa. He served in the Iowa House of Representatives from 1988 to 1992, representing House District 67, comprising Lucas, Wayne, Monroe, and Clark counties.
