= Craig Johnson (Iowa politician) =

American politician (born 1963)

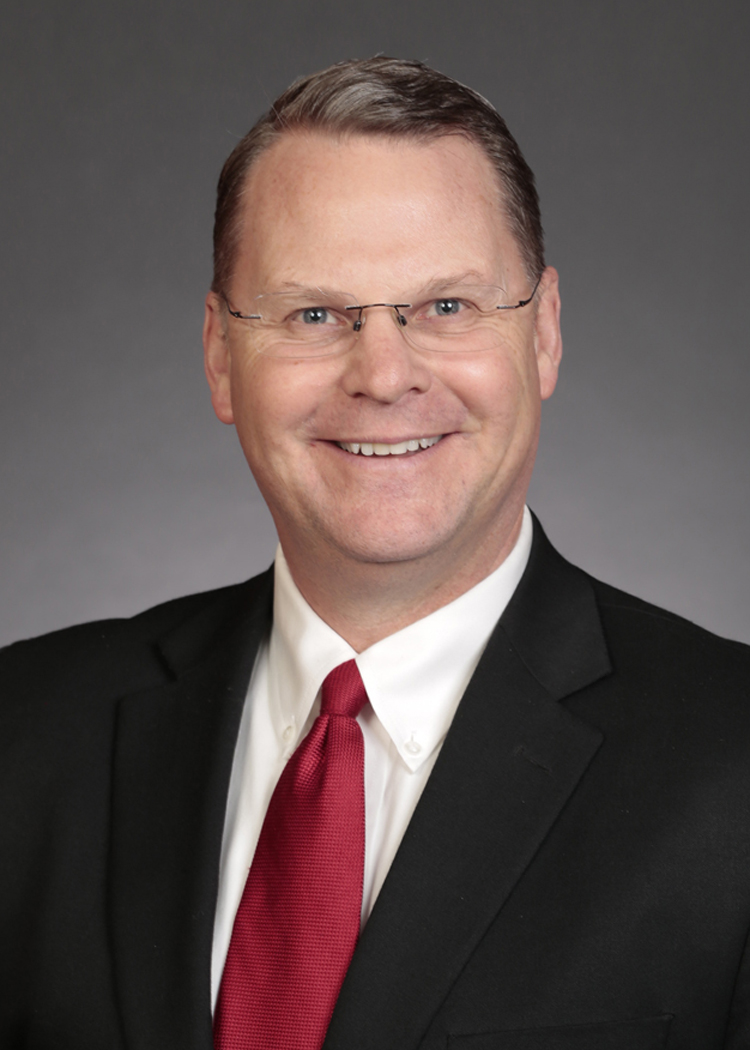

Member of the Iowa House of Representatives from the 67th district
- Incumbent
- Assumed office January 9, 2023
- Preceded by: Eric Gjerde

Member of the Iowa Senate from the 32nd district
- In office January 2017 – January 2023
- Preceded by: Brian Schoenjahn
- Succeeded by: Mike Klimesh

Personal details
- Born: September 16, 1963 (age 63) Independence, Iowa, U.S.
- Party: Republican
- Spouse: Susan
- Children: Hannah
- Education: University of Northern Iowa
- Occupation: Financial Planner

Craig Paul Johnson (born September 16, 1963) is an American politician currently serving as the representative of the 67th District in the Iowa House of Representatives. He was previously elected as a Republican member of the Iowa State Senate's 32nd district in 2016. He defeated Democratic incumbent Brian Schoenjahn. He previously ran for election to the Iowa House of Representatives in 2014 for the 64th district. Johnson, born and raised in Independence, Iowa, is a financial planner and former sales and engineer manager.

As of January 2026, Johnson serves on the following committees: Administration and Rules, Education, Environmental Protection, Ethics, Health and Human Services, State Government, Ways and Means, Subacute Mental Health Care Services Interim Study Committee. Johnson is the chair of the Ethics committee.

Iowa House of Representatives
Preceded by Liz Bennett	67th District; 2023 – present	Succeeded by Incumbent
Preceded by	57th District; 2017 – 2023	Succeeded by Pat Grassley
