= Jerome Amos Jr. =

American politician (born 1954)

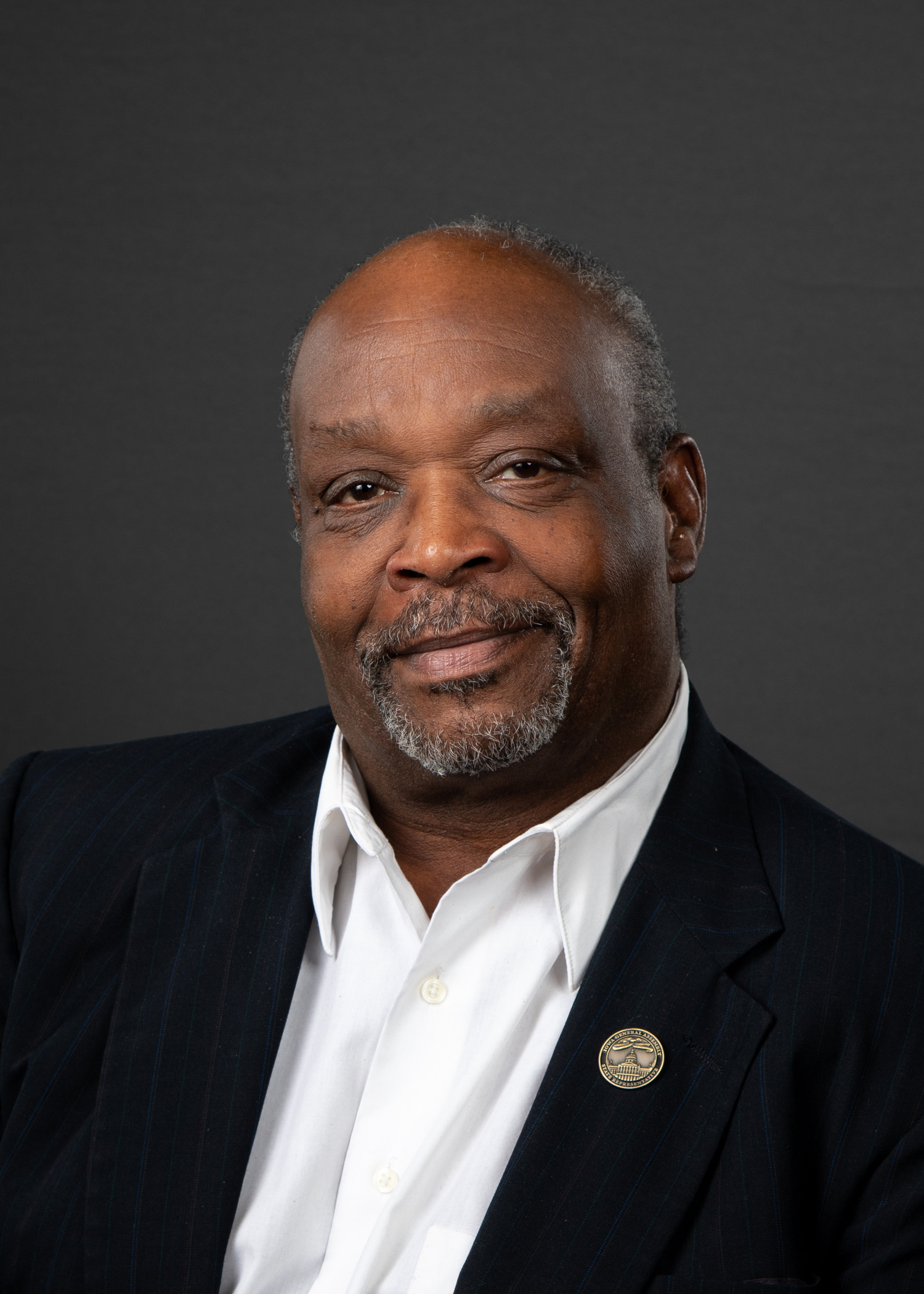

Member of the Iowa House of Representatives from the 62nd district
- Incumbent
- Assumed office January 9, 2023
- Preceded by: Ras Smith

Personal details
- Born: 1954 (age 71–72) Waterloo, Iowa, U.S.
- Party: Democratic
- Spouse: Tina Harmon
- Children: 7
- Education: Upper Iowa University
- Occupation: Adjunct instructor

Jerome Amos Jr. (born 1954) is an American politician, teacher and former machinist who has represented the 62nd district in the Iowa House of Representatives since January 2023, which consists of parts of northeast Black Hawk County, including much of northeastern Waterloo. He is a member of the Democratic Party.

== Early life ==
Amos Jr. was born in 1954 in Waterloo, Iowa, where he was raised. He graduated from Waterloo East High School in 1972 and attended Upper Iowa University for one year in 1974 before working for John Deere.

== Political career ==
Prior to his election to the House, Amos Jr. served on the Waterloo City Council from 2016 to 2023. He has also served on the Iowa Workforce Development Board, Iowa Energy Sector Partnership, and various Black Hawk County boards.

Following decennial redistricting in 2021, Amos Jr. announced his intent to run for the 62nd district in the Iowa House of Representatives after incumbent Ras Smith announced he would not seek reelection. He won the Democratic primaries unopposed on June 7, 2022, and won the general election on November 8 unopposed with over 96 percent of the vote.

In 2024, Amos Jr. filed to run for reelection. He won the Democratic primaries unopposed on June 4, 2024, and will run unopposed in the general election on November 5, 2024.

Amos Jr. currently serves on the Labor and Workforce, Public Safety, Veterans Affairs, and Administration Committees, and the Regulation Appropriations Subcommittee.

== Personal life ==
Amos Jr. has a wife, Tina Harmon-Amos. He has seven adult children – four sons and three daughters – and nineteen grandchildren. He resides in Waterloo. He has served as an adjunct instructor at Hawkeye Community College since 2013, and previously worked as a machinist at John Deere for 36 years.

In 2019, Amos Jr. was fined $20 for failing to file his campaign finance report by the deadline while serving as a Waterloo City Council member.

In 2023, Amos Jr. filed for chapter 13 bankruptcy, claiming $93,700 in liabilities, mainly mortgage, an auto loan and over $11,000 in tax debt. U.S. Bank had filed for foreclosure in May 2022.

== Electoral history ==
Election	Political result	Candidate	Party	Votes	%
Iowa House of Representatives Democratic primary elections, 2022; District 62; Turnout: 1,282	Democratic (newly redistricted)	Jerome Amos Jr.	Democratic	1,280	99.8
Iowa House of Representatives Democratic primary elections, 2022; District 62; Turnout: 1,282	Democratic (newly redistricted)	Other/Write-in votes		2	0.2
Iowa House of Representatives general elections, 2022; District 62; Turnout: 6,105	Democratic (newly redistricted)	Jerome Amos Jr.	Democratic	5,917	96.9
Iowa House of Representatives general elections, 2022; District 62; Turnout: 6,105	Democratic (newly redistricted)	Other/Write-in votes		188	3.1
