= Dennis Parmenter =

American politician (1950–2020)

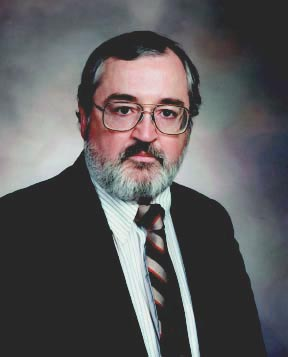

Member of the Iowa House of Representatives from the 62nd district
- In office January 11, 1999 – January 7, 2001
- Preceded by: William Bernau
- Succeeded by: Barbara Finch

Personal details
- Born: December 27, 1950 Elkhart, Iowa, United States
- Died: December 12, 2020 (aged 69) Des Moines, Iowa
- Party: Democratic
- Education: North Polk Community School District, Iowa State University, Drake University Law School
- Occupation: Lawyer

Dennis W. Parmenter (December 27, 1950 – December 12, 2020) was an American politician and lawyer.

Parmenter was born in Elkhart, Iowa to his parents Paul Parmenter and Kathryn, née Ault. After his mother died, his father remarried Sandra Sorenson. Dennis Parmenter attended North Polk High School, Iowa State University, and the Drake University School of Law. He married Kathy Houge in October 1970, with whom he had three children. Parmenter was an Assistant Story County Attorney, and in 1979, established his legal practice in Huxley.

Parmenter previously served as mayor of Huxley. A Democrat, he was a member of the Iowa House of Representatives from 1999 to 2001 (62nd district).

He died on December 12, 2020, in Des Moines. Parmenter's memorial service was held in June 2021.
