= Mark Davitt =

American politician

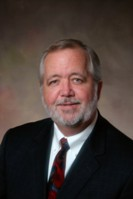

Member of the Iowa House of Representatives from the 74th district
- In office 2003–2009
- Preceded by: Libby Jacobs
- Succeeded by: Kent Sorenson

Personal details
- Born: 1952 (age 73–74) Winterset, Iowa, U.S.
- Party: Democrat
- Website: Davitt's website

Mark Davitt (born 1952) is a former Iowa State Representative from the 74th District. He has served in the Iowa House of Representatives from 2003 to 2009.

Davitt was re-elected in 2006 with 5,802 votes (52%), defeating Republican opponent Doug Shull. He was defeated for re-election in 2008, losing to Republican Kent Sorenson.

Davitt was a candidate in the special election for the seat in the Iowa Senate resigned by Sorenson in 2013.

== Early life and education ==
Davitt was born in Winterset, Iowa and was raised working on his parents farm.

== Career ==
He is also a small business owner. He owns and operates Davitt Photo Alliance, which specialized is commercial photography. Davitt, a Democrat, served six years in the Iowa House.

== Organizations ==
He is a member of the following organizations:

- St. Thomas Aquinas Catholic Church in Indianola
- Knights of Columbus
- Indianola Lions Club
- Elected member of the Warren County Extension Council
- Past member of Warren County Farm Bureau

== Family ==
Davitt is the son of Phil and Theo. He is married to his wife Amy Duncan and together they have two children, Elizabeth and Duncan.

Iowa House of Representatives
Preceded by Libby Jacobs	74th District; 2003 – 2009	Succeeded by Kent Sorenson
