= Deborah Berry =

American politician (born 1958)

Deborah L. Berry
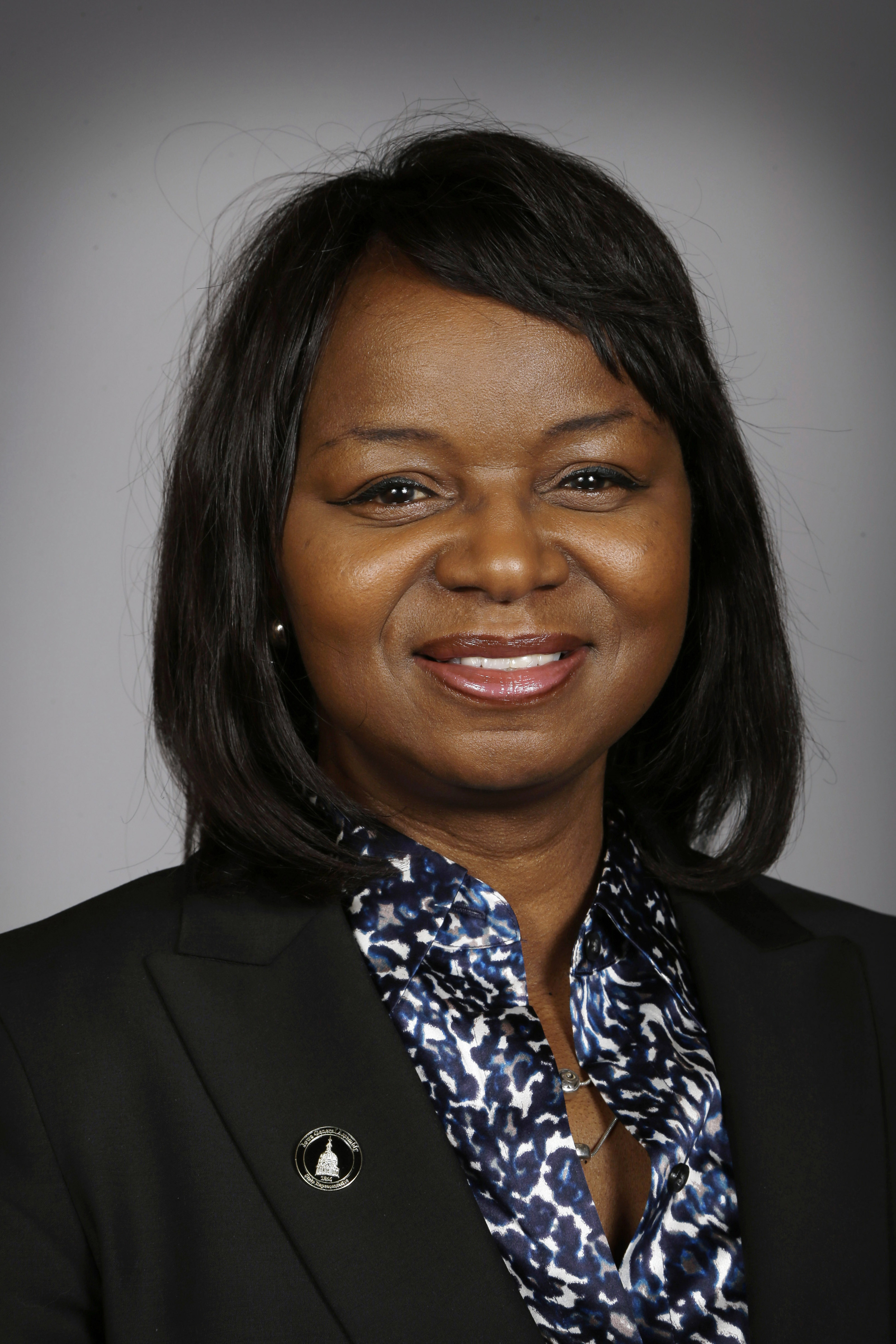

Member of the Iowa House of Representatives from the 62nd district
- In office January 13, 2003 – January 8, 2017
- Preceded by: Bob Brunkhorst
- Succeeded by: Ras Smith

Personal details
- Born: September 2, 1958 (age 68) Waterloo, Iowa, U.S.
- Party: Democratic
- Children: 1
- Education: Upper Iowa University
- Website: Berry's website

Deborah L. Berry (born September 2, 1958) is an American politician who was the Iowa State Representative from the 62nd District from 2012 to 2017. From 2003 to 2012 she represented the 22nd district, most of which is part of the current 62nd district.

Iowa House of Representatives District 62 includes of all the area that is located on the east side and a small part that is on the west side of the Cedar River in Waterloo, Iowa. The incorporated Iowa cities of Evansdale, Elk Run Heights, and Raymond. Also included is some countryside areas of Black Hawk County. A detailed map is available.

== Electoral history ==
Berry began her official political career in January 2000 when
she was elected to the Waterloo City Council for the Fourth Ward.

2002 Iowa House of Representatives District 22 Democratic Primary election

Deborah L. Berry (597 votes)
Joe Rodriguez (422 votes)
Quentin Hart (440 votes)
Melvina B. Scott (346 votes)

2002 Iowa House of Representatives District 22 General Election

Deborah L. Berry (D) (5071 votes) (66%)
Norm Granger (R) (2589 votes)

2004 Iowa House of Representatives District 22 General Election

Deborah L. Berry (D) (10,038 votes) (99%) unopposed
write in (109 votes)

2006 Iowa House of Representatives District 22 General Election

Deborah L. Berry (D) (5,985 votes) (77%)
Michael Anthony (R) (1759 votes)

2008 Iowa House of Representatives District 22 General Election

Deborah L. Berry (D) (10,081 votes) (99%) unopposed
write in (145 votes)

2010 Iowa House of Representatives District 22 General Election

Deborah L. Berry (D) (5744 votes) (98%) unopposed Unofficial Iowa Election Results
write in (115 votes)

== Committee membership history ==
As Representative for Iowa House District 22

For the 80th General Assembly for the years 2003-2004

Education
Human Resources
Judiciary
Health & Human Services Appropriations Subcommittee
45 Subcommittee assignments with 24 meetings

For the 81st General Assembly for the years 2005-2006

Human Resources
Judiciary
Public Safety
Health & Human Services Appropriations Subcommittee
60 Subcommittee assignments with 56 meetings

For the 82nd General Assembly for the years 2007-2008

Public Safety, Vice Chair
Appropriations
Commerce
Government Oversight
85 Subcommittee assignments with 104 meetings

For the 83rd General Assembly for the years 2009-2010

Human Resources, Vice Chair
Rebuild Iowa and Disaster Recovery, Vice Chair
Government Oversight
Public Safety
39 Subcommittee assignments with 47 meetings
A member of to the Non-Legislative Commission on the Status of African Americans

== Personal life ==
Berry is a Baptist. She raised one son, Roshawn.

Iowa House of Representatives
Preceded by Bob Brunkhorst	22nd District; 2003–2013	Succeeded by Greg Forristall
Preceded by Bruce Hunter	62nd District; 2013 – 2017	Succeeded by Ras Smith
