= Philip Wise =

American politician (born 1946)

Philip Leon Wise
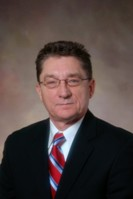

Member of the Iowa House of Representatives from the 92nd district 98th (1993 – 2003) 62nd (1987 – 1993)
- In office January 2, 1987 – January 11, 2009
- Preceded by: William Sullivan
- Succeeded by: Jerry Kearns

Personal details
- Born: September 5, 1946 (age 80) Maryville, Missouri
- Party: Democratic
- Spouse: Chris Burks
- Children: 1 Child
- Education: Northwest Missouri State University
- Website: Wise's website

Philip Leon "Phil" Wise (born September 5, 1946) is a former ten-term Iowa State Representative. He served in the Iowa House of Representatives from 1987 through 2009 and did not seek re-election in 2008. He received his BS and MS from Northwest Missouri State University.

During his last term in the Iowa House, Wise served on the Commerce, Economic Growth, Education, and Ways and Means committees and served as Vice Chair of the Administrative Rules Review Committee. His political experience includes serving as Chair of the Lee County Democratic Party and serving as Assistant Minority Leader in the Iowa House during the 75th General Assembly.

== Electoral history ==
*incumbent

District 62 and 98 elections (1986 – 2000)

Election	Political result	Candidate	Party	Votes	%
Iowa House of Representatives elections, 1986; District 62; Turnout: 9,837	Democratic hold	Philip Wise	Democratic	5,232	53.2
Iowa House of Representatives elections, 1986; District 62; Turnout: 9,837	Democratic hold	Mary Jo Smith	Republican	4,605	46.8
Iowa House of Representatives elections, 1988; District 62; Turnout: 11,594	Democratic hold	Philip Wise*	Democratic	6,768	58.4
Iowa House of Representatives elections, 1988; District 62; Turnout: 11,594	Democratic hold	Darrell Rodger	Republican	4,826	41.6
Iowa House of Representatives elections, 1990; District 62; Turnout: 9,044	Democratic hold	Philip Wise*	Democratic	5,295	58.5
Iowa House of Representatives elections, 1990; District 62; Turnout: 9,044	Democratic hold	Thomas G. Teeters	Republican	3,747	41.4
Iowa House of Representatives elections, 1992; District 98	Democratic (newly redistricted)	Philip Wise*	Democratic	unopposed	
Iowa House of Representatives elections, 1994; District 98; Turnout: 8,414	Democratic hold	Philip Wise*	Democratic	4,513	53.6
Iowa House of Representatives elections, 1994; District 98; Turnout: 8,414	Democratic hold	John Hoyt	Republican	3,886	46.2
Iowa House of Representatives elections, 1996; District 98; Turnout: 11,300	Democratic hold	Philip Wise*	Democratic	6,853	60.6
Iowa House of Representatives elections, 1996; District 98; Turnout: 11,300	Democratic hold	Dan Sullivan	Republican	4,426	39.2
Iowa House of Representatives elections, 1998; District 98	Democratic hold	Philip Wise*	Democratic	unopposed	
Iowa House of Representatives elections, 2000; District 98; Turnout: 12,191	Democratic hold	Philip Wise*	Democratic	6,799	55.8
Iowa House of Representatives elections, 2000; District 98; Turnout: 12,191	Democratic hold	David E. Paris	Republican	3,289	27.0
Iowa House of Representatives elections, 2000; District 98; Turnout: 12,191	Democratic hold	Hughie Tweedy	Libertarian	2,098	17.2

Election	Political result	Candidate	Party	Votes	%
Iowa House of Representatives primary elections, 2002; District 92; Turnout: 3,309	Democratic (newly redistricted)	Philip Wise*	Democratic	1,694	51.2
Iowa House of Representatives primary elections, 2002; District 92; Turnout: 3,309	Democratic (newly redistricted)	Rick Larkin*	Democratic	1,613	48.7
Iowa House of Representatives elections, 2002; District 92; Turnout: 8,817	Democratic (newly redistricted)	Philip Wise*	Democratic	6,823	77.4
Iowa House of Representatives elections, 2002; District 92; Turnout: 8,817	Democratic (newly redistricted)	Mei-Ling Shaw	Libertarian	1,937	22.0
Iowa House of Representatives elections, 2004; District 92; Turnout: 13,430	Democratic hold	Philip Wise*	Democratic	7,322	54.5
Iowa House of Representatives elections, 2004; District 92; Turnout: 13,430	Democratic hold	Brent Fellows	Republican	6,092	45.4
Iowa House of Representatives elections, 2006; District 92	Democratic hold	Philip Wise*	Democratic	unopposed	

Iowa House of Representatives
Preceded by William Sullivan	62nd District; 1987 – 1993	Succeeded by William Bernau
Preceded by Joan Hester	98th District; 1993 – 2003	Succeeded by Gerald Jones
Preceded by Keith Kreiman	92nd District; 2003 – 2009	Succeeded by Jerry Kearns
