= Ned Chiodo =

American politician (1942–2025)

Member of the Iowa House of Representatives
- In office January 10, 1977 – January 13, 1985

Personal details
- Born: Ned Frank Chiodo; August 2, 1942 Des Moines, Iowa, U.S.
- Died: September 4, 2025 (aged 83) West Des Moines, Iowa, U.S.
- Party: Democratic
- Spouse: Marilyn Pigneri
- Children: 4, including Frank

Ned Frank Chiodo (August 2, 1942 – September 4, 2025) was an American politician in the state of Iowa.

== Life and career ==
Chiodo was born in Des Moines, Iowa. He attended Drake University and was a golf pro. He served in the Iowa House of Representatives from 1977 to 1985, as a Democrat (67th district from 1977 to 1983, and 81st district from 1983 to 1985). His son Frank Chiodo also served in the House of Representatives, from 1997 to 2005. Chiodo died in West Des Moines, Iowa, on September 4, 2025, at the age of 83.
