= Jo Ann Trucano =

American politician (born 1943)

Jo Ann Trucano (born August 30, 1943) is an American former politician.

Jo Ann Determan was born to parents Joe and Delores on August 30, 1943, in Early, Iowa. After she graduated from St. Joseph Academy, Determan enrolled at Iowa State University and worked for Massey Ferguson Foam Molding. She married Allen Trucano in 1961, and raised four children. She later became known as Jo Ann Jensen.

After Allen Trucano lost the 1976 Iowa House of Representatives election for District 62, Jo Ann Trucano ran for office in 1980, and served a single term as a state representative from January 12, 1981, to January 9, 1983, as a Republican legislator for the same district. She began campaigning for District 43 of the Iowa Senate in the summer of 1982, losing to Thomas Mann. Trucano later served as treasurer of the group Fairness in Taxation, opposed to a proposed 1-cent local sales tax.
