= Glen Massie =

American politician (born 1958)

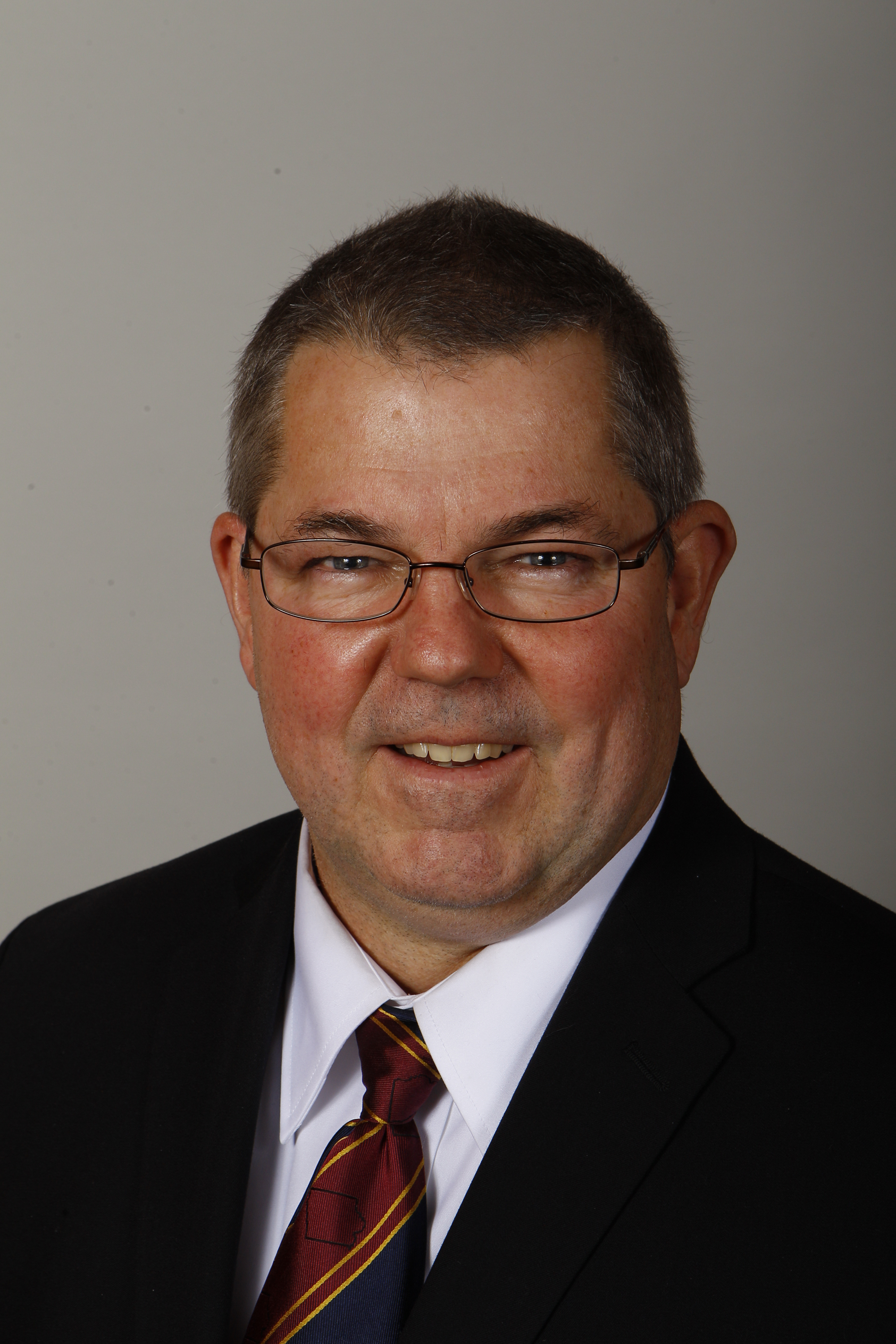

Member of the Iowa House of Representatives from the 74th district

Personal details
- Party: Republican

Glen H. Massie (born 13 January 1958) is a Republican Iowa State Representative from the 74th District.

== Endorsements ==
In 2011, he endorsed Republican presidential candidate Ron Paul.
